= Uttarakhand =

State in northern India

- State
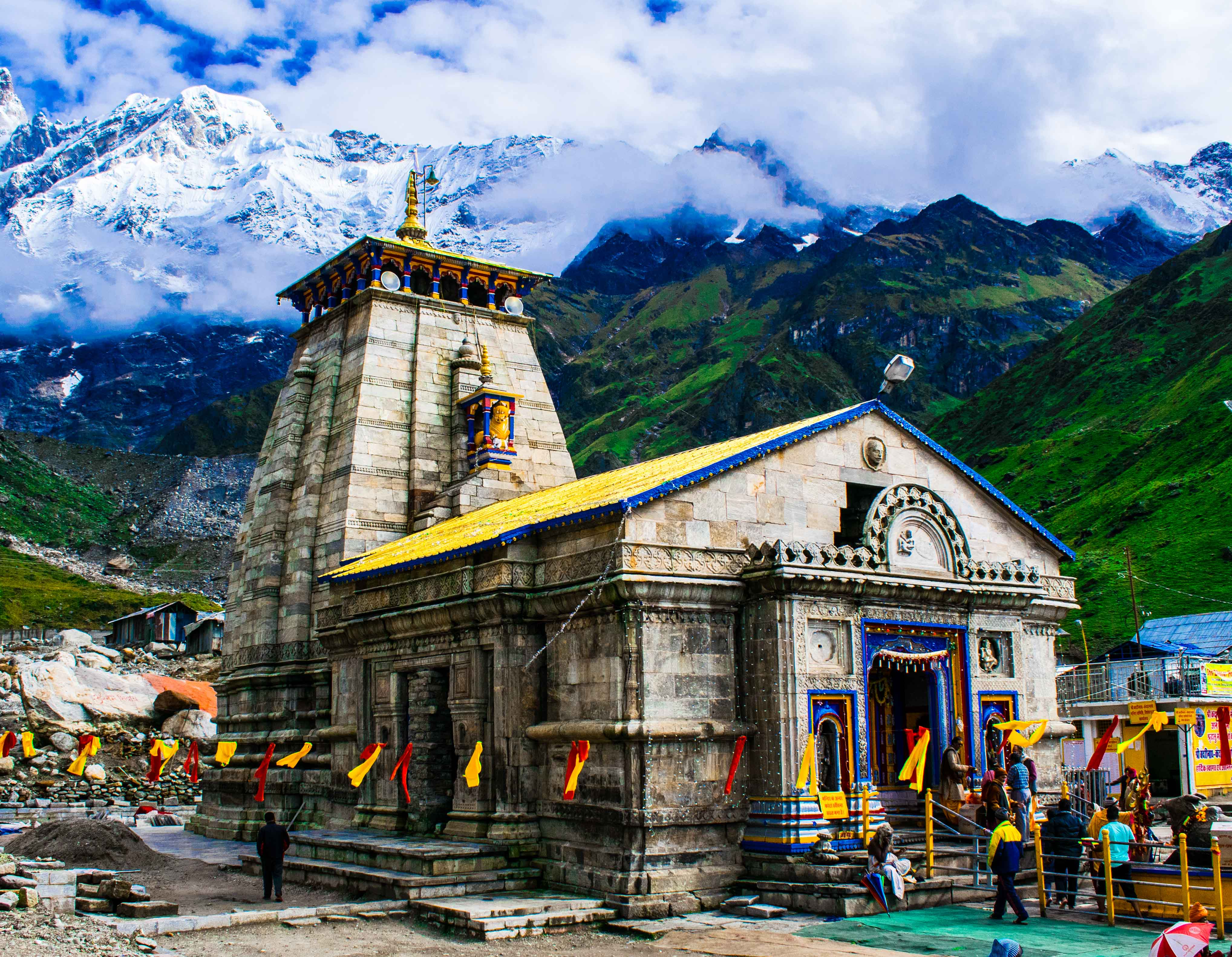
- Kedarnath Temple Badrinath Temple The Garhwal Himalayas from Auli Aarti at Har Ki Pauri

- Emblem of Uttarakhand
- Etymology: Northern Land
- Nickname(s): Devabhumi; Land of the Gods
- Motto: Satyameva Jayate (Sanskrit) "Truth alone triumphs"
- Anthem: Uttarakhand Devabhumi Matribhumi (Hindi, Garhwali, and Kumaoni) "Uttarakhand, Land of the Gods, O Motherland!"
- Location of Uttarakhand in India
- Coordinates: 30.33°N 78.06°E
- Country: India
- Region: North India
- Previously was: Part of Uttar Pradesh
- As state: 9 November 2000
- Formation (by bifurcation): 9 November 2000
- Capital: Bhararisain; Dehradun (winter)
- Largest city: Dehradun
- Districts: 13

Government
  - Body: Government of Uttarakhand
  - Governor: Gurmit Singh
  - Chief Minister: Pushkar Singh Dhami (BJP)

Area
  - Total: 53,483 km^{2} (20,650 sq mi)
  - Rank: 19th

Dimensions
  - Length: 320 km (200 mi)
  - Width: 385 km (239 mi)
- Highest elevation (Nanda Devi): 7,817 m (25,646 ft)
- Lowest elevation (Sharda Sagar Reservoir): 187 m (614 ft)

Population (2025)
  - Total: ▲11,913,000
  - Rank: 21st
  - Density: 213/km^{2} (550/sq mi)
  - Urban: 35.90%
  - Rural: 64.10%
- Demonyms: Uttarakhandi

Language
  - Additional official: Sanskrit
  - Official script: Devanagari

GDP
  - Total (2026–2027): ▲₹4.28 lakh crore (US$46 billion) (nominal) ▲$210.28 billion (PPP)
  - Rank: 20th
  - Per capita: ▲₹359,033 (US$3,800) (nominal) ▲$17,652 (PPP) (10th)
- Time zone: UTC+05:30 (IST)
- ISO 3166 code: IN-UK
- Vehicle registration: UK
- HDI (2023): ▲0.722 high (20th)
- Literacy (2017): 87.6% (13th)
- Sex ratio (2011): 963♀ / 1000♂ (4th)
- Website: uk.gov.in
- Symbols of Uttarakhand
- Foundation day: Uttarakhand Day
- Bird: Himalayan monal
- Butterfly: West Himalayan common peacock
- Fish: Golden mahseer
- Flower: Brahma Kamal
- Mammal: Alpine musk deer
- Tree: Burans
- State highway mark
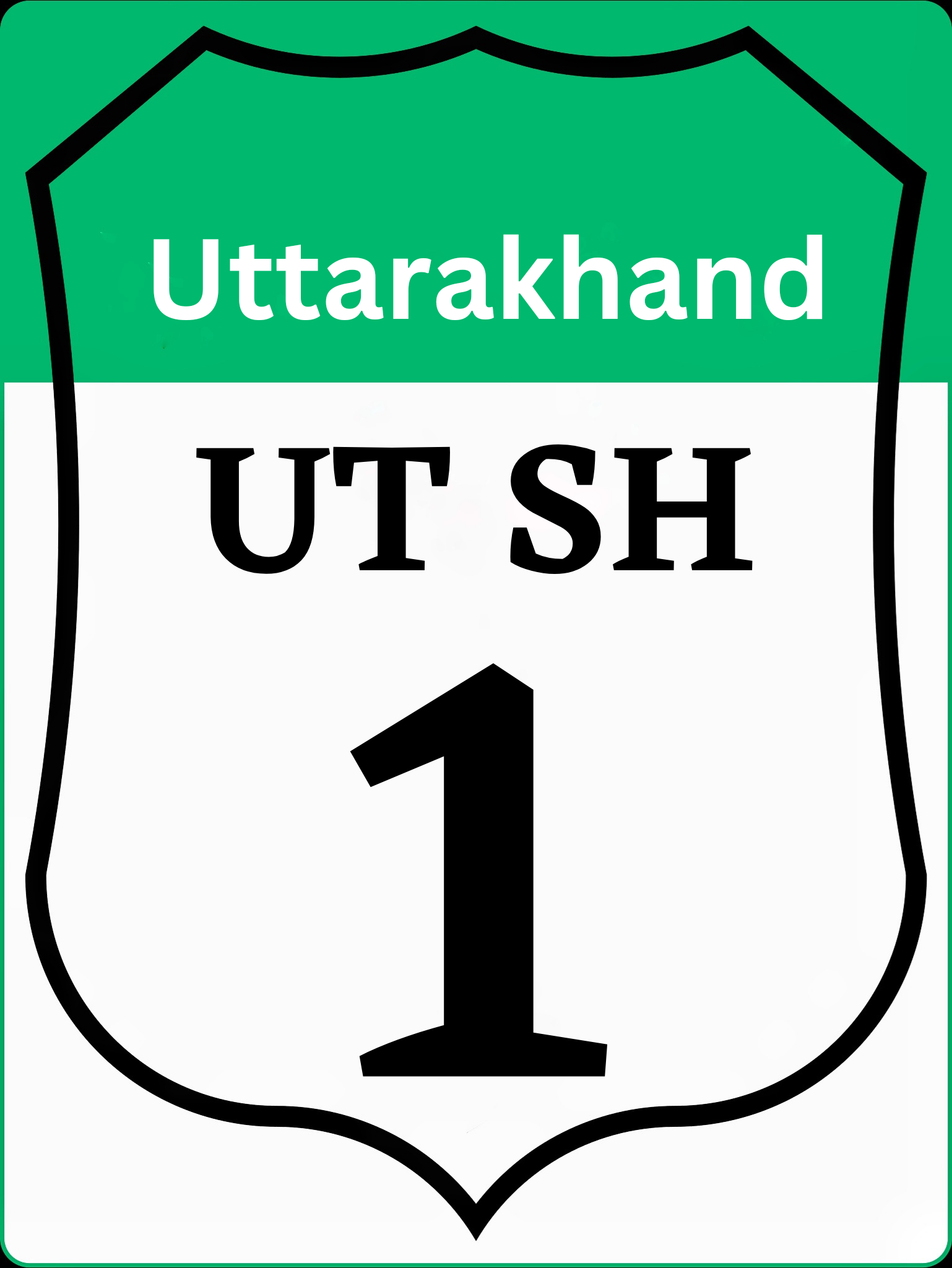
- State highway of Uttarakhand
- List of Indian state symbols

Uttarakhand (Hindi: Uttarākhaṇḍ, pronounced [ˈʊt̪ːəɾaːkʰəɳɖ], lit. 'Northern Land'), also known as Uttaranchal (English: /ˌʊtəˈræntʃəl/; the official name until 2007), is a state in northern India. The state is bordered by Himachal Pradesh to the northwest, Tibet to the north, Nepal to the east and Uttar Pradesh to the south. Uttarakhand has a total area of 53,483 km^{2} (20,650 sq mi), equal to 1.6% of the total area of India. Dehradun serves as the state winter capital, with Bhararisain being the summer capital and Nainital being the judicial capital. The state is divided into two divisions, Garhwal and Kumaon, with a total of 13 districts. The forest cover in the state is 45.4% of the state's geographical area. The cultivable area is 16% of the total geographical area. The two major rivers of the state, the Ganges and its tributary Yamuna, originate from the Gangotri and Yamunotri glaciers respectively. Ranked 6th among the Top 10 Greenest States in India with Best AQI.

Uttarakhand's history dates back to prehistoric times, with archaeological evidence showcasing human habitation. It was part of the ancient Kuru and the Panchal kingdoms during the Vedic age, and later saw the rise of dynasties like the Kunindas and influence of Buddhism as evidenced by Ashokan edicts. Though primarily driven by agriculture and hydropower, the state's economy is now dominated by the service industry. The service sector comprises primarily travel, tourism, and hotel industry. The Gross State Domestic Product (GSDP) of Uttarakhand is ₹3.78 lakh crore (equivalent to ₹3.9 trillion or US$42 billion in 2026). The state contributes five seats to the lower house Lok Sabha and three seats to the upper house Rajya Sabha.

Inhabitants of the state are called either Garhwali or Kumaoni depending on their region of origin. Hinduism is practised by more than three-fourths of the population, with Islam being the next-largest religious group. Hindi is the most widely spoken language and is also the official language of the state, along with native regional languages include Garhwali, Jaunsari, Rongpo, Bhotia, Gurjari and Kumaoni. The state is often referred to as the "Devabhumi" (lit. 'Land of the Gods'), due to its religious significance and numerous Hindu temples and pilgrimage centres found throughout the state. Along with several historical, natural and religious tourist destinations, including Char Dham, Haridwar, Rishikesh, Panch Kedar, Himalayas, and Sapta Badri. Uttarakhand is also home to two World Heritage sites.

== Etymology ==
Uttarakhand's name is derived from the Sanskrit words uttara (उत्तर) meaning 'north', and khaṇḍa (खण्ड) meaning 'section' or 'part', altogether simply meaning 'Northern Part'.

The name finds mention in early Hindu scriptures as the combined region of "Kedarkhand" (present day Garhwal) and "Manaskhand" (present day Kumaon). Uttarakhand was also the ancient Puranic term for the central stretch of the Indian Himalayas.

== History ==
Archaeological evidence supports the existence of humans in the region since prehistoric times. Though initially, it was believed that due to harsh climate and mountainous terrain, this was a barren and uninhabited land. But after various excavations and the study of ancient literature, it is now established that the history of Uttarakhand goes back to Stone Age. Evidences of Stone Age settlements have been found in various parts of Kumaon and Garhwal, particularly notable are the rock shelters at Lakhudyar, Almora.

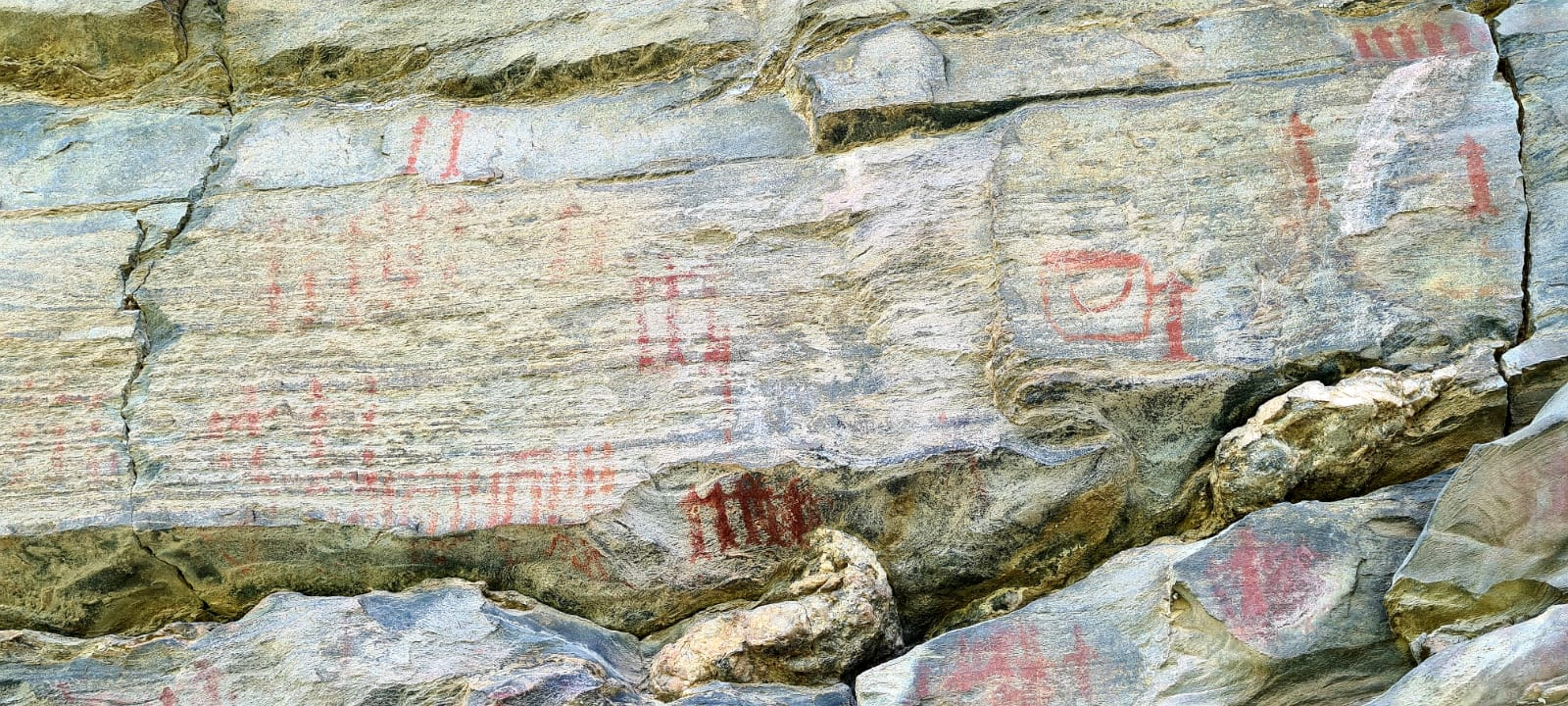
Stone age paintings at Lakhudiyar Caves, Almora

The region formed a part of the Uttarakuru Kingdom during the Vedic age of Ancient India. Among the first major dynasties of Kumaon were the Kunindas in the second century BCE who practised an early form of Shaivism. Ashokan edicts at Kalsi show the early presence of Buddhism in this region.

Ancient rock paintings, rock shelters, paleolithic age stone tools (hundreds of thousands of years old), and megaliths provide evidence that the mountains of the region have been inhabited since prehistoric times. There are also archaeological remains that show the existence of early Vedic (c. 1500 BCE) practices in the area. The Pauravas, Khasas, Kiratas, Nandas, Mauryas, Kushanas, Kunindas, Guptas, Karkotas, Palas, Gurjara-Pratiharas, Katyuris, Raikas, Chands, Parmars or Panwars, Mallas, Shahs and the British have ruled Uttarakhand in turns.

Among the first major dynasties of Garhwal and Kumaon were the Kunindas in the second century BCE who practised an early form of Shaivism and traded salt with Western Tibet. It is evident from the Ashokan edict at Kalsi in Western Garhwal that Buddhism made inroads in this region. Shamanic Hindu practices deviating from Hindu orthodoxy also persisted here. However, Garhwal and Kumaon were restored to nominal Vedic Hindu rule due to the travels of Shankaracharya and the arrival of migrants from the plains.

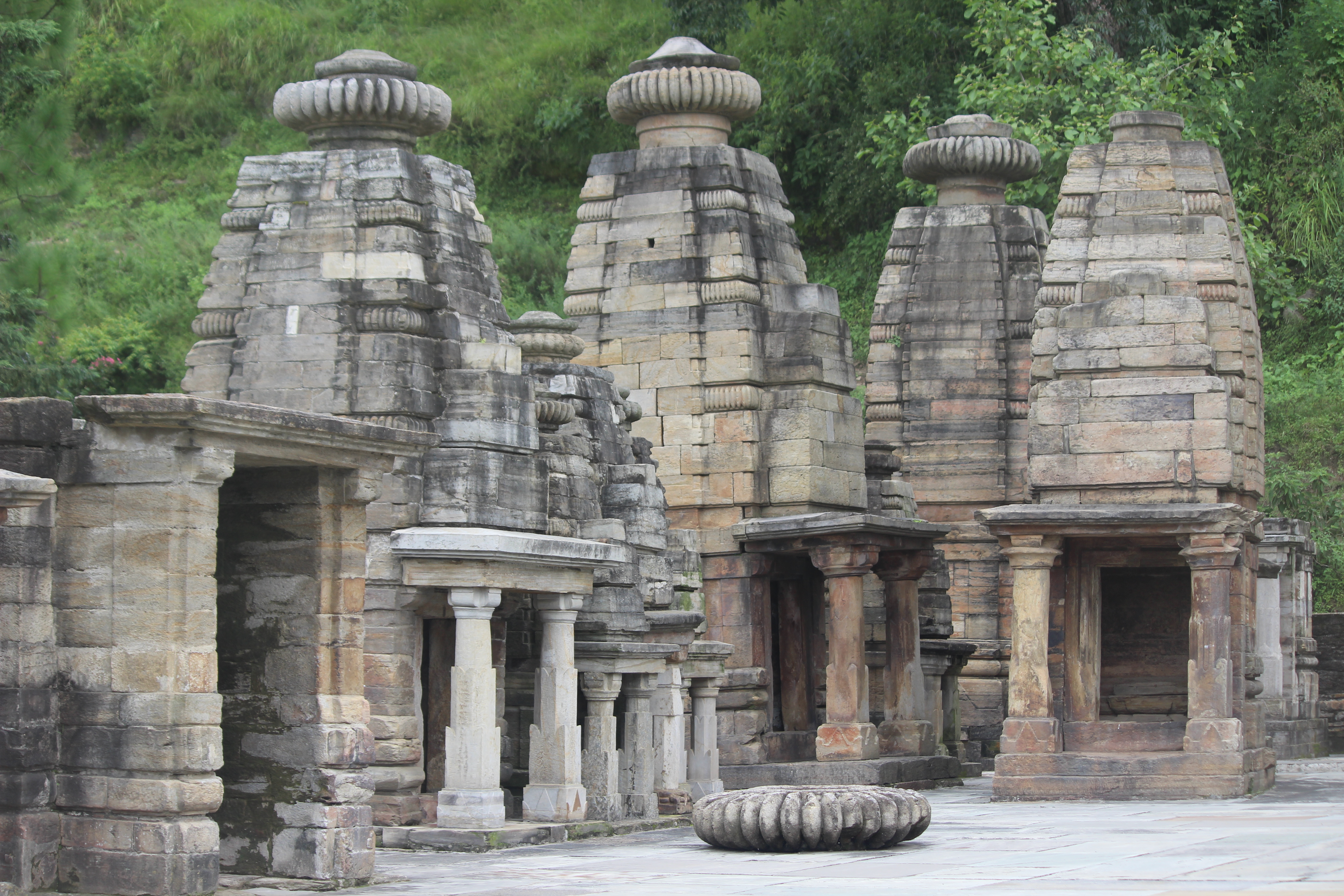
Katarmal Sun Temple constructed by the Katyuri Kings in the 9th century CE

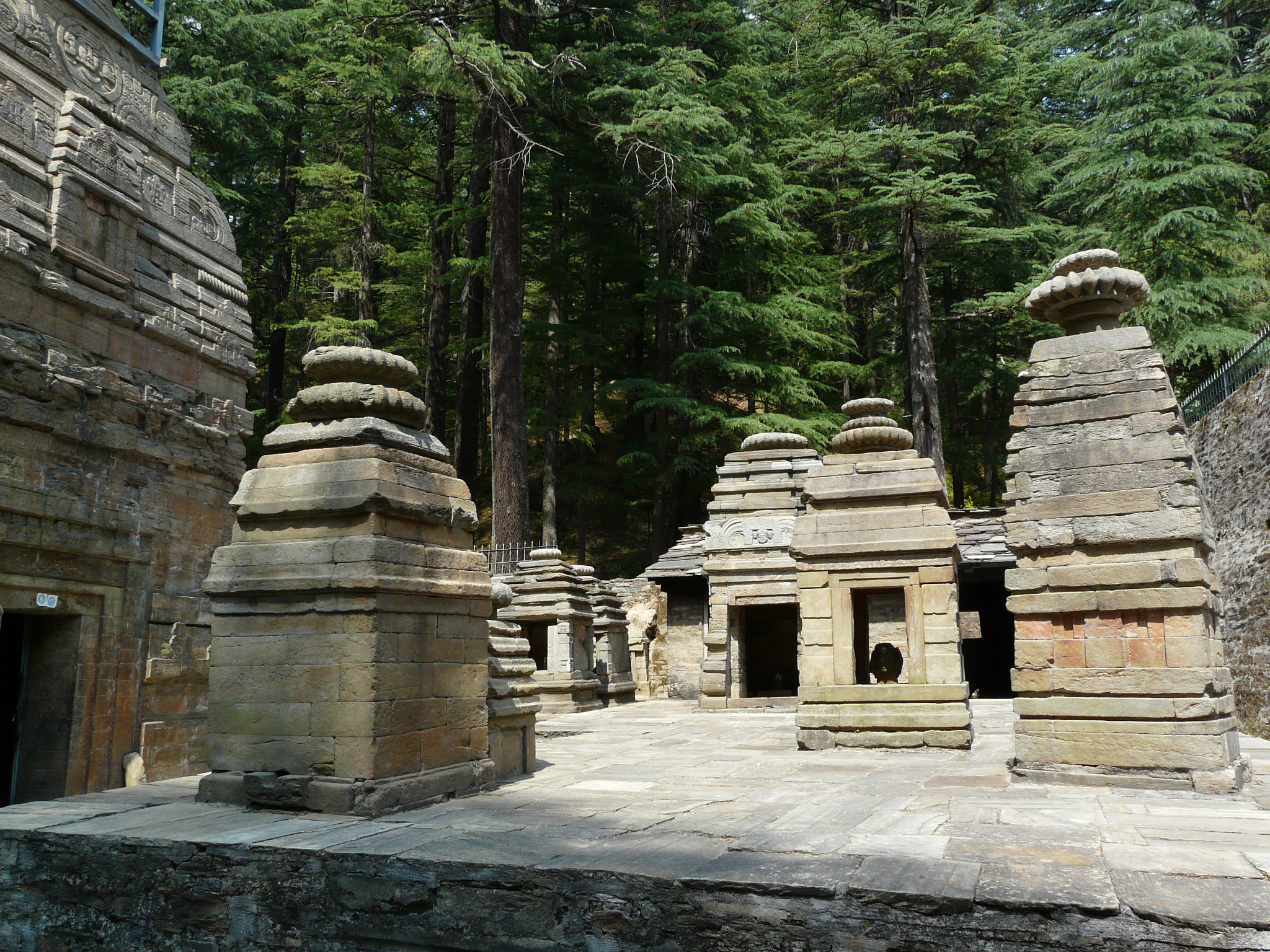
Jageshwar Temples Complex are a group of over 100 Hindu temples dated between 7th and 12th century.

Between the 4th and 14th centuries, the Katyuri dynasty dominated lands of varying extents from the Katyur valley (modern-day Baijnath) in Kumaon. The historically significant temples at Jageshwar are believed to have been built by the Katyuris and later remodelled by the Chands. Other peoples of the Tibeto-Burman group known as Kirata are thought to have settled in the northern highlands as well as in pockets throughout the region, and are believed to be ancestors of the modern day Bhotiya, Raji, Jad, and Banrawat people. During the medieval period, the region was consolidated under the Katyuri rulers of Kumaon also known as 'Kurmanchal Kingdom'. After the fall of Katyuris, the region was divided into the Kumaon Kingdom and the Garhwal Kingdom.

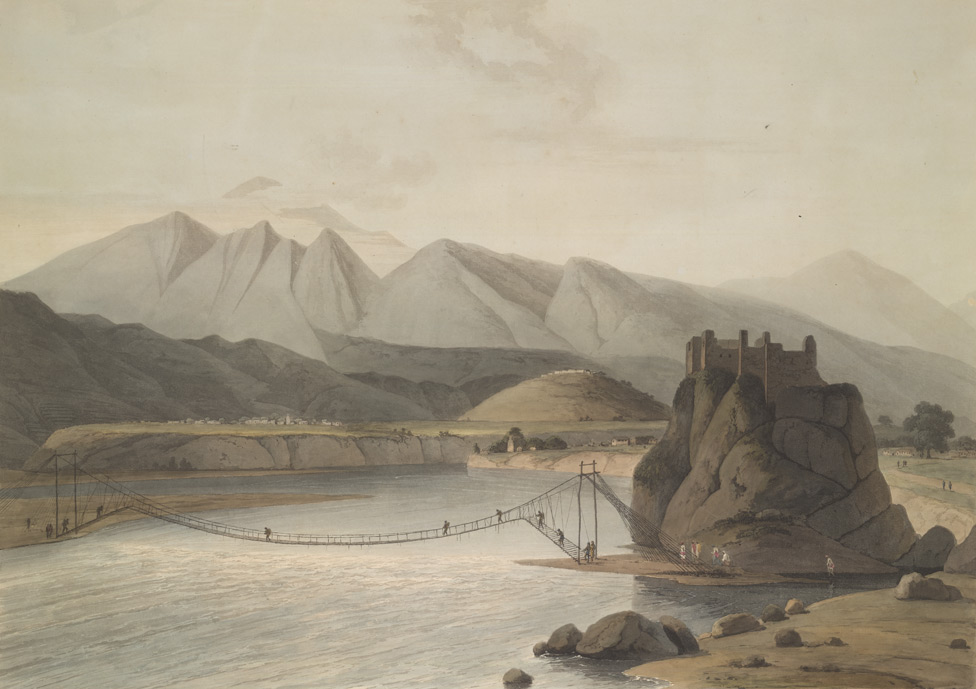
Rope bridge across Alaknanda River at Srinagar, 1784–94 – the capital of the Garhwal Kingdom

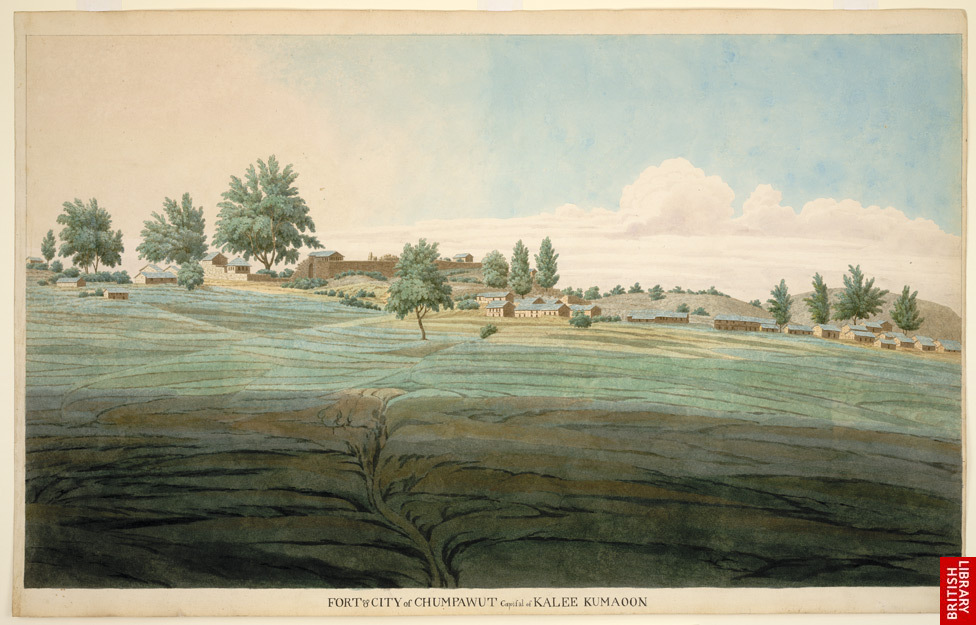
Fort of Champawat, 1815 – the first capital of the Chand kings of Kumaon Kingdom

By the medieval period, the region was consolidated under the Garhwal Kingdom in the west and the Kumaon Kingdom in the east. During this period, learning and new forms of painting (the Pahari school of art) developed. Modern-day Garhwal was likewise unified under the rule of Parmars who, along with many other Rajputs and Brahmins, also arrived from the plains. In 1791, the expanding Gorkha Empire of Nepal overran Almora, the seat of the Kumaon Kingdom. It was annexed to the Kingdom of Nepal by Amar Singh Thapa. In 1803, the Garhwal Kingdom also fell to the Gurkhas. After the Anglo-Nepalese War, this region was ceded to the British as part of the Treaty of Sugauli and the erstwhile Kumaon Kingdom along with the eastern region of Garhwal Kingdom was merged with the Ceded and Conquered Provinces. In 1816, the Garhwal Kingdom was re-established from a smaller region in Tehri as a princely state.

In the southern part of Uttarakhand in Haridwar district (earlier part of Saharanpur till 1988) the dominance and kingship (rajya) was exercises by some local Hindu rulers, the area was under control of Parmar (Panwar) chief in eastern Saharanpur including Haridwar in kingship of Raja Sabha Chandra of Jabarhera (Jhabrera). The Panwar clan held more than 500 villages there in upper Doab, and that situation was confirmed in 1759 in a grant by a Rohilla governor of 505 villages and 31 hamlets to one Manohar Singh (written in some records as Raja Nahar Singh son of Sabha Chandra). In 1792 Ram Dayal and his son Sawai Singh were ruling the area but due to some family reasons Ramdayal left Jhabrera and went to Landhaura village, now some villages were under the control of Raja Ramdayal Singh at Landhaura, and some under his son Sawai Singh at Jhabrera. Hence, there were two branches of Jhabrera State (riyasat) main branch at Jhabrera and the second one at Landhaura, both father and son were ruling simultaneously without any conflicts till the death of Raja Sawai Singh of Jabarhera in 1803. After the death of Sawai Singh total control of powers transferred to Ram Dayal Singh at Landhaura, but some villages were given to descendants of Sawai Singh and her widow to collect revenue.

By 1803 the Landhaura villages numbered 794 under Raja Ram Dayal Singh. Raja Ram Dayal Singh died on 29 March 1813. These holdings, at least those in the original grant made by the Rohilla governor, were initially recognised by the British in land settlements concluded with Ram Dayal and his heirs. As the years passed, more and more settlements appear to have been made with the village communities, however, and by 1850 little remained of the once vast estate of the Landhaura Khübars. There are many temples and Ghats on Ganga built by Rajas of Landhaura estate, therefore they also famous as 'Haridwari Rajas' in folk history and literature. Famous Dakshamahadev Temple at Kankhal was built by Queen DhanKaur of Landhaura in 1810 A.D.

Next the Timli estate Founded in Dehradun mid-15th century by Chaudhari Ram Singh, a member of the Chokar Hindu family, the estate remained under the rule of this dynasty until its eventual annexation. In 1548, two chieftains, Pohda Singh and Lal Karan, from the Titron region in Saharanpur district, crossed the Sivalik hills, conquered the entire Dehradun area, and established the Timli estate. They also founded a town named Timli Chaudhari Bhagwan Singh have power of magistrate.

Raja Ranjit Singh of Samthar state, born in 1943, was married at a young age to a princess from the Chokar family, which ruled in Timli estate in Dehradun.

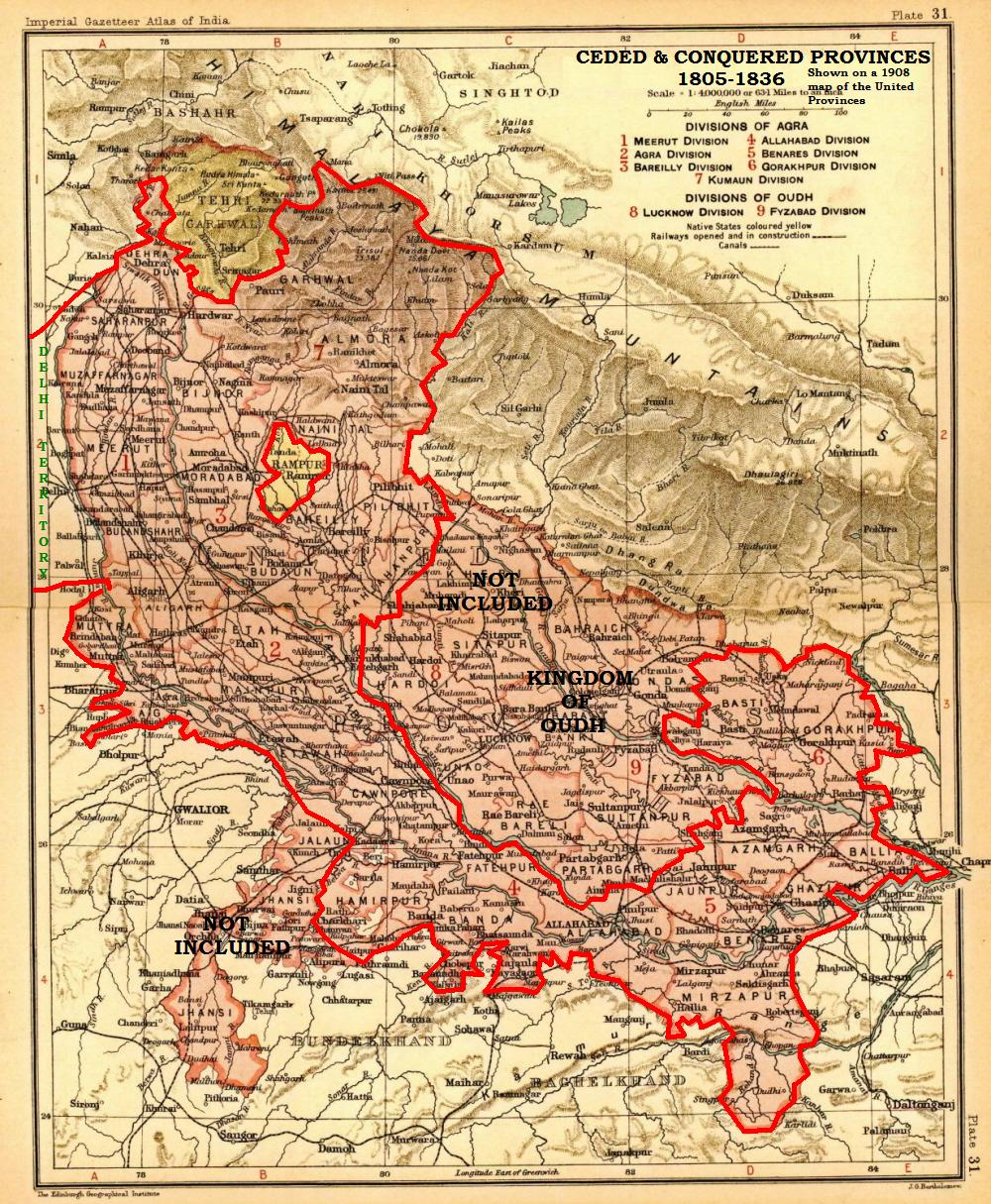
Uttarakhand as a part of the Ceded and Conquered Provinces

After India attained independence from the British, the Garhwal Kingdom was merged into the state of Uttar Pradesh, where Uttarakhand composed the Garhwal and Kumaon Divisions. Until 1998, Uttarakhand was the name most commonly used to refer to the region, as various political groups, including the Uttarakhand Kranti Dal (Uttarakhand Revolutionary Party), began agitating for separate statehood under its banner. Although the erstwhile hill kingdoms of Garhwal and Kumaon were traditional rivals the inseparable and complementary nature of their geography, economy, culture, language, and traditions created strong bonds between the two regions. These bonds formed the basis of the new political identity of Uttarakhand, which gained significant momentum in 1994, when demand for separate statehood achieved almost unanimous acceptance among both the local populace and national political parties.

The most notable incident during this period was the Rampur Tiraha firing case on the night of 1 October 1994, which led to a public uproar. On 24 September 1998, the Uttar Pradesh Legislative Assembly and Uttar Pradesh Legislative Council passed the Uttar Pradesh Reorganisation Bill, which began the process of forming a new state. Two years later the Parliament of India passed the Uttar Pradesh Reorganisation Act, 2000 and thus, on 9 November 2000, Uttarakhand became the 27th state of the Republic of India.

Uttarakhand is also well known for the mass agitation of the 1970s that led to the formation of the Chipko environmental movement and other social movements. Though primarily a livelihood movement rather than a forest conservation movement, it went on to become a rallying point for many future environmentalists, environmental protests, and movements the world over and created a precedent for non-violent protest. It stirred up the existing civil society in India, which began to address the issues of tribal and marginalised people. So much so that, a quarter of a century later, India Today mentioned the people behind the "forest satyagraha" of the Chipko movement as among "100 people who shaped India". One of Chipko's most salient features was the mass participation of female villagers. It was largely female activists that played pivotal role in the movement. Gaura Devi was the leading activist who started this movement, other participants were Chandi Prasad Bhatt, Sunderlal Bahuguna, and Ghanshyam Raturi, the popular Chipko poet.

== Geography ==
Topography map of Uttarakhand, showing elevations shaded from green to brown (higher)

Uttarakhand has a total area of 53,483 km^{2} (20,650 sq mi), of which 86% is mountainous and 65% is covered by forest. Most of the northern part of the state is covered by high Himalayan peaks and glaciers. In the first half of the nineteenth century, the expanding development of Indian roads, railways, and other physical infrastructure was giving rise to concerns over indiscriminate logging, particularly in the Himalaya. Two of the most important rivers in Hinduism originate in the glaciers of Uttarakhand, the Ganges at Gangotri and the Yamuna at Yamunotri. They are fed by myriad lakes, glacial melts, and streams. These two along with Badrinath and Kedarnath form the Chota Char Dham, a holy pilgrimage for the Hindus.

Uttarakhand lies on the southern slope of the Himalaya range, and the climate and vegetation vary greatly with elevation, from glaciers at the highest elevations to subtropical forests at the lower elevations. The highest elevations are covered by ice and bare rock. Below them, between 3,000 and 5,000 metres (9,800 and 16,400 ft) are the western Himalayan alpine shrub and meadows. The temperate western Himalayan subalpine conifer forests grow just below the tree line. At 3,000 to 2,600 metres (9,800 to 8,500 ft) elevation they transition to the temperate western Himalayan broadleaf forests, which lie in a belt from 2,600 to 1,500 metres (8,500 to 4,900 ft) elevation. Below 1,500 metres (4,900 ft) elevation lie the Himalayan subtropical pine forests. The Upper Gangetic Plains moist deciduous forests and the drier Terai-Duar savanna and grasslands cover the lowlands along the Uttar Pradesh border in a belt locally known as Bhabar. These lowland forests have mostly been cleared for agriculture, but a few pockets remain.

=== Climate ===
Uttarakhand has a temperate but varies greatly from north to south. The climatic conditions experienced in the state vary subtropical in the southern part to alpine in the upper reaches of the Himalayan mountain in the northern parts. The winter season from December to February, is extreme with temperatures fluctuating anywhere between 5 °C (41 °F) to 20 °C (68 °F). In higher altitudes and mountainous regions, temperatures often drop below freezing point. Cold winds blow across Uttarakhand, especially in the higher altitudes and mountainous regions. These winds bring cold temperatures and often carry moisture, contributing to the heavy snowfall in places like the Himalayan ranges and hill stations.

During Pre-monsoon or hot weather season from March to May, temperature starts to rise and steadily rises till it reaches its peak in May to the middle of June, when the mean maximum temperature in southern parts and valleys of the state is at about 34 °C (93 °F) C to 38 °C (100 °F), But in recent days the maximum temperature has increased up to 40 °C (104 °F). and mean minimum temperature is at about 20 °C (68 °F) to 24 °C (75 °F) C. June to September constitutes the southwest monsoon season and the period of October and November is of post monsoon season. The state receives rainfall mainly due monsoon depressions originating in the Bay of Bengal during the southwest monsoon season. The total annual rainfall for the state as a whole is 133 cm and total annual number of rainy days are about 63 cm. Although, rainfall in the state varies from place to place due to its rugged topography. Precipitation is not heavy and occurs in the form of rain and snow. Winds are generally light of the order of 1 to 4 kmph in the valleys and 5 to 10 kmph at elevations of 2 km increasing further with higher altitudes.

=== Flora and fauna ===
State symbols of Uttarakhand
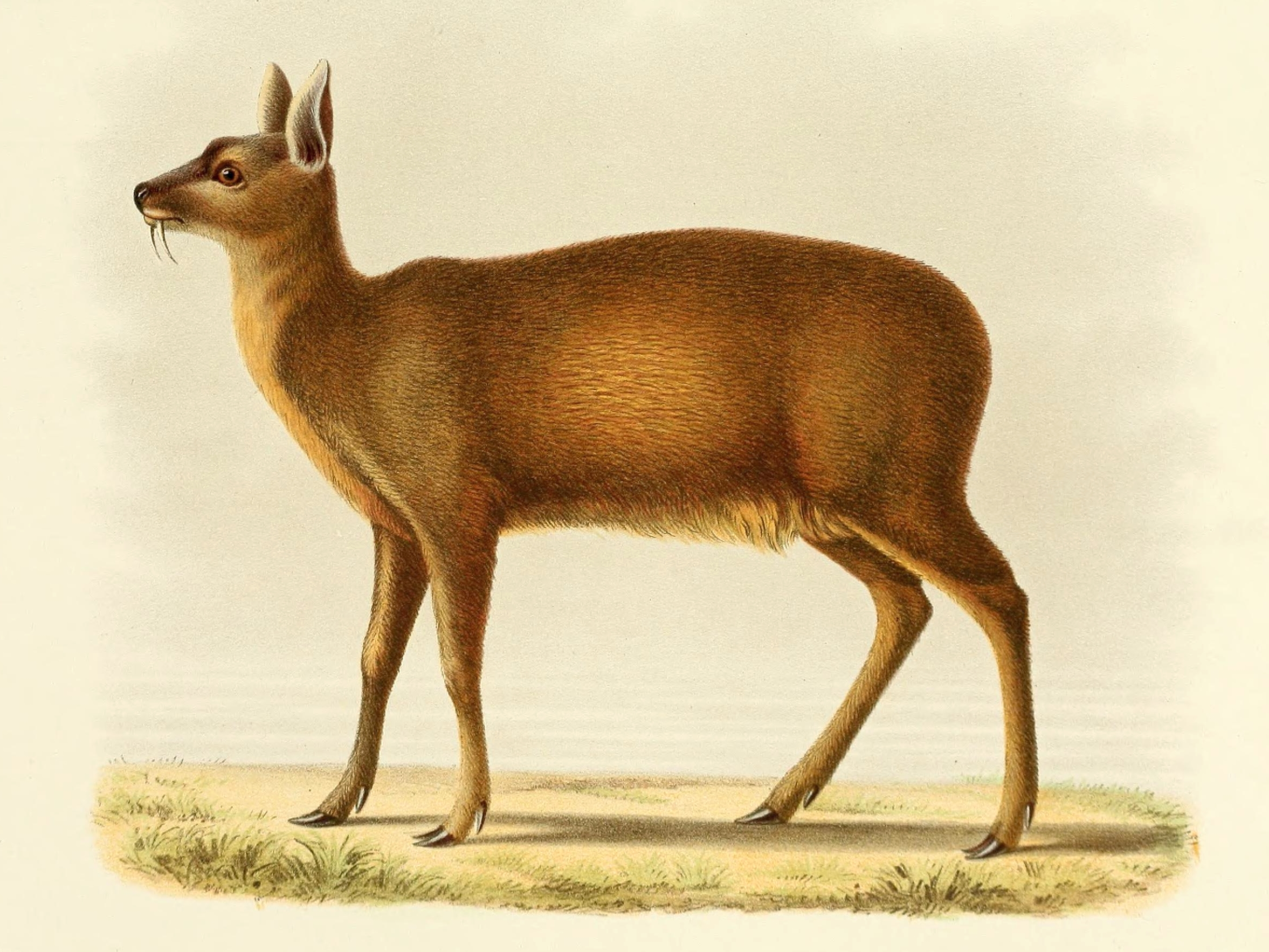
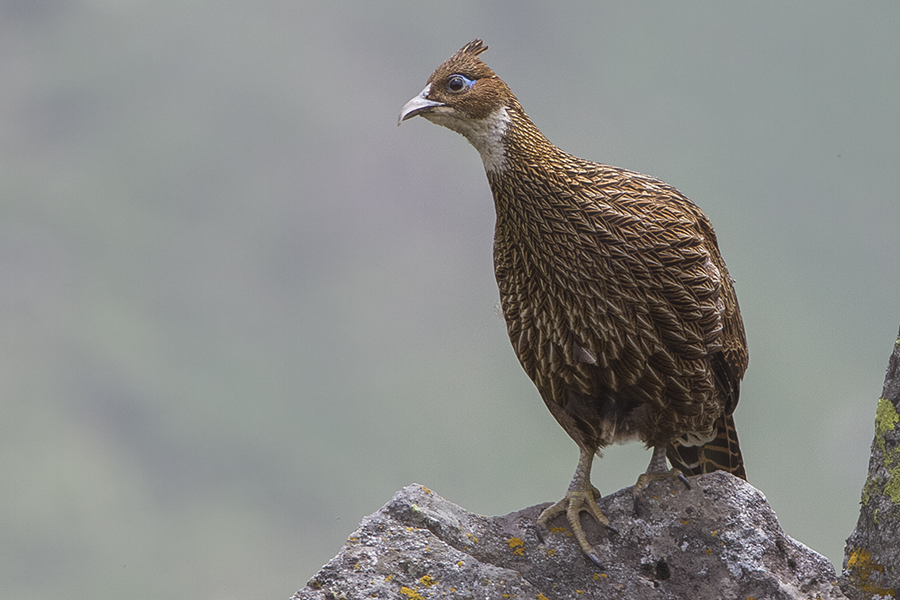
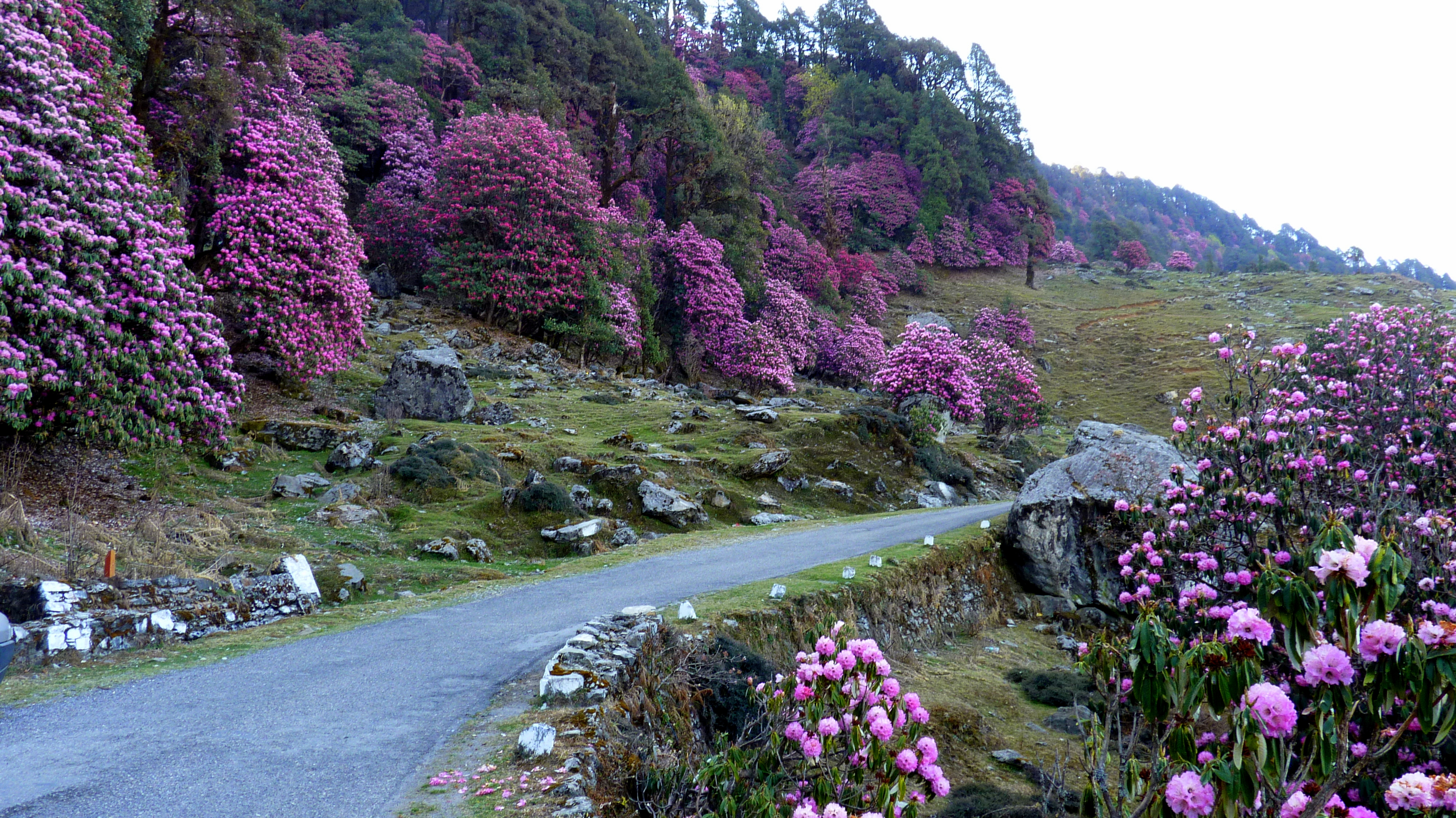
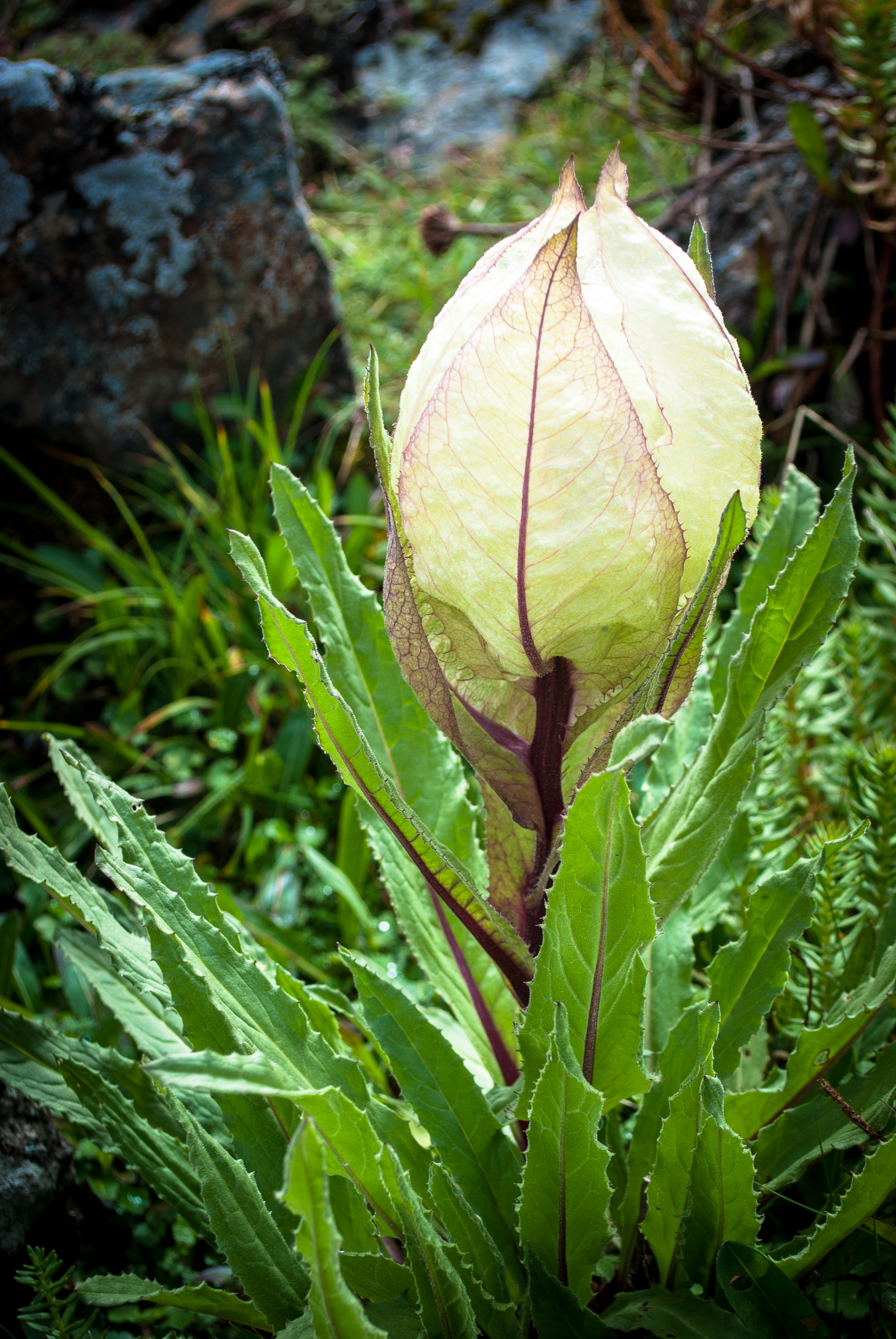
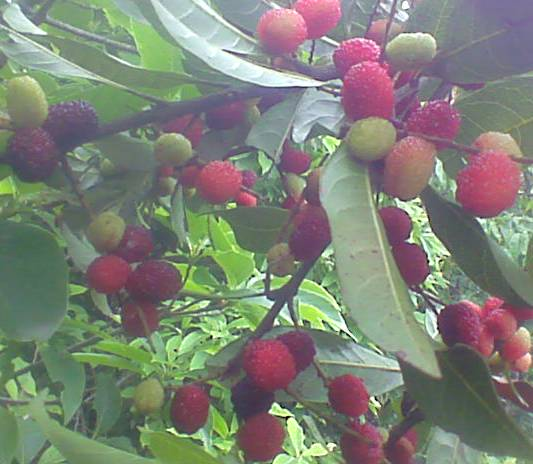
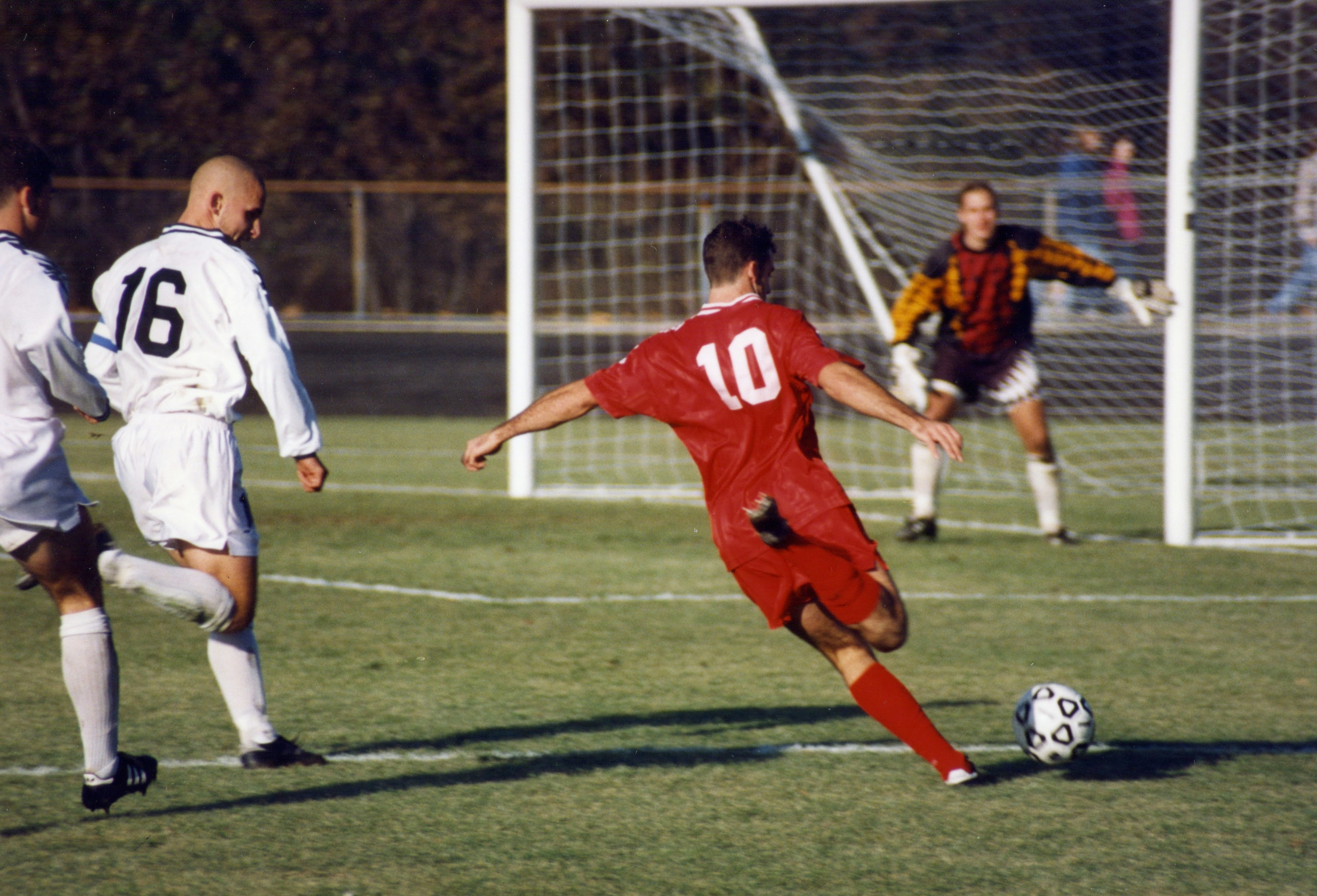
| State animal | Alpine musk deer (Moschus chrysogaster) |
| State bird | Himalayan monal (Lophophorus impejanus) |
| State tree | Burans (Rhododendron arboreum) |
| State flower | Brahma Kamal (Saussurea obvallata) |
| State fruit | Kafal (Myrica esculenta) |
| State sport | Football |

Uttarakhand has a diversity of flora and fauna. It has a recorded forest area of 34,666 km^{2} (13,385 sq mi), which constitutes 65% of the total area of the state. The vegetation of the state majorly comprises alpine trees and tropical rainforests. The state is home to rare species of plants and animals, many of which are protected by sanctuaries and reserves. National parks in Uttarakhand include the Jim Corbett National Park (the oldest national park of India) in Nainital and Pauri Garhwal District, and Valley of Flowers National Park & Nanda Devi National Park in Chamoli District, which together are a UNESCO World Heritage Site. A number of plant species in the valley are internationally threatened, including several that have not been recorded from elsewhere in Uttarakhand. Rajaji National Park in Haridwar, Dehradun and Pauri Garhwal District and Govind Pashu Vihar National Park & Gangotri National Park in Uttarkashi District are some other protected areas in the state.

Bengal tigers and leopards are found in areas that are abundant in hills but may also venture into the lowland jungles. Smaller felines include the jungle cat, fishing cat, and leopard cat. Other mammals include four kinds of deer (barking, sambar, hog and chital), sloth, Brown and Himalayan black bears, Indian grey mongooses, otters, yellow-throated martens, bharal, Indian pangolins, and langur and rhesus monkeys. In the summer, elephants can be seen in herds of several hundred. Marsh crocodiles (Crocodylus palustris), gharials (Gavialis gangeticus) and other reptiles are also found in the region. Local crocodiles were saved from extinction by captive breeding programs and subsequently re-released into the Ramganga river. Several freshwater terrapins and turtles like the Indian sawback turtle (Kachuga tecta), brahminy river turtle (Hardella thurjii), and Ganges softshell turtle (Trionyx gangeticus) are found in the rivers. Butterflies and birds of the region include red helen (Papilio helenus), the great eggfly (Hypolimnos bolina), common tiger (Danaus genutia), pale wanderer (Pareronia avatar), jungle babbler, tawny-bellied babbler, great slaty woodpecker, red-breasted parakeet, orange-breasted green pigeon and chestnut-winged cuckoo. In 2011, a rare migratory bird, the bean goose, was also seen in the Jim Corbett National Park. A critically endangered bird, last seen in 1876 is the Himalayan quail endemic to the western Himalayas of the state.

Evergreen oaks, rhododendrons, and conifers predominate in the hills. Prunus cerasoides (pahiyya), sal (Shorea robusta), silk cotton tree (Bombax ciliata), Dalbergia sissoo, Mallotus philippensis, Acacia catechu, Bauhinia racemosa, and Bauhinia variegata (camel's foot tree) are some other trees of the region. Albizia chinensis, the sweet sticky flowers of which are favoured by sloth bears, are also part of the region's flora.

A decade long study by Prof. Chandra Prakash Kala concluded that the Valley of Flowers is endowed with 520 species of higher plants (angiosperms, gymnosperms and pteridophytes), of these 498 are flowering plants. The park has many species of medicinal plants including Dactylorhiza hatagirea, Picrorhiza kurroa, Aconitum violaceum, Polygonatum multiflorum, Fritillaria roylei, and Podophyllum hexandrum.

In the summer season of 2016, a large portion of forests in Uttarakhand caught fires and rubbled to ashes during Uttarakhand forest fires incident, which resulted in the damage of forest resources worth billions of rupees and death of 7 people with hundreds of wild animals died during fires. During the 2021 Uttarakhand forest fires, there was widespread damage to the forested areas in Tehri district.

A number of native plants are deemed to be of medicinal value. The government-run Herbal Research and Development Institute carries out research and helps conserve medicinal herbs that are found in abundance in the region. Local traditional healers still use herbs, in accordance with classical Ayurvedic texts, for diseases that are usually cured by modern medicine.

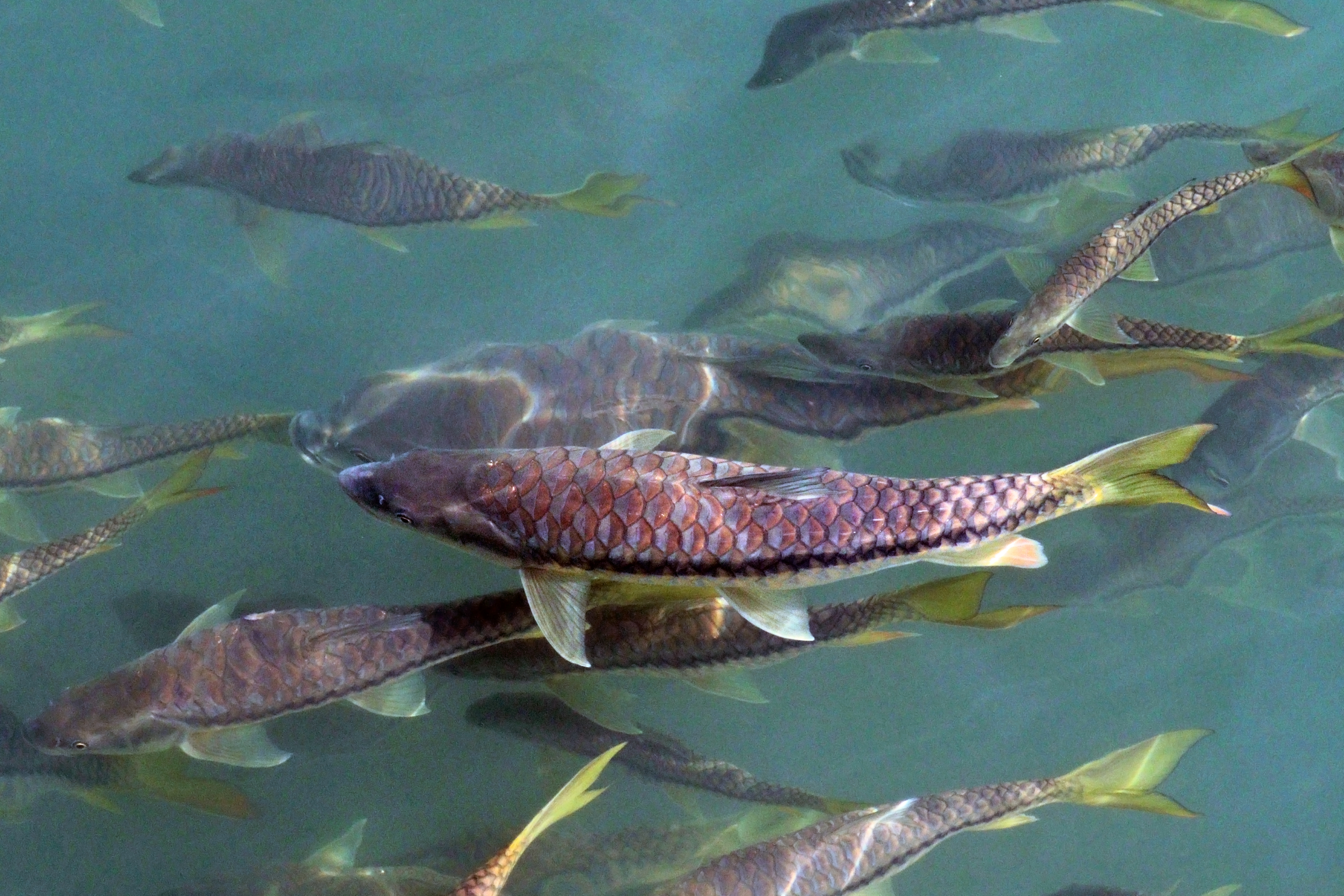
Golden Mahseer (Tor putitora)

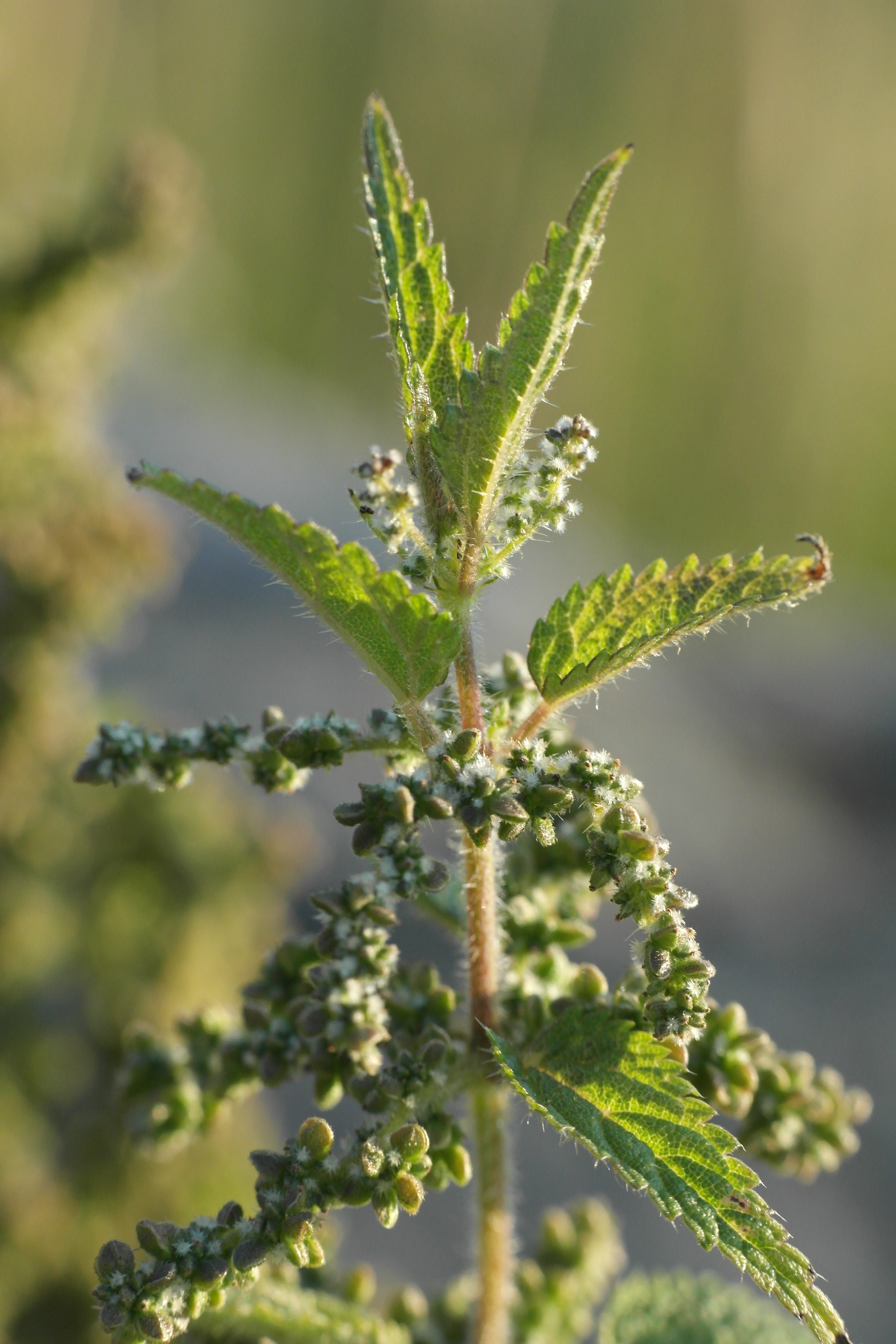
Kandali (Urtica dioica)

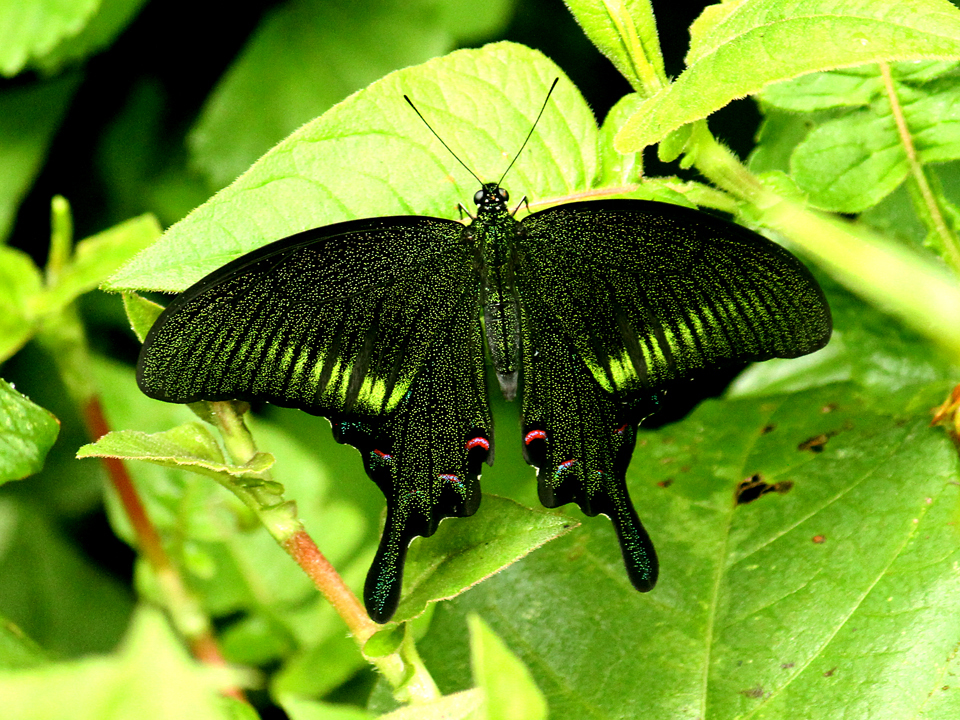
West Himalayan Common Peacock (Papilio bianor polyctor)

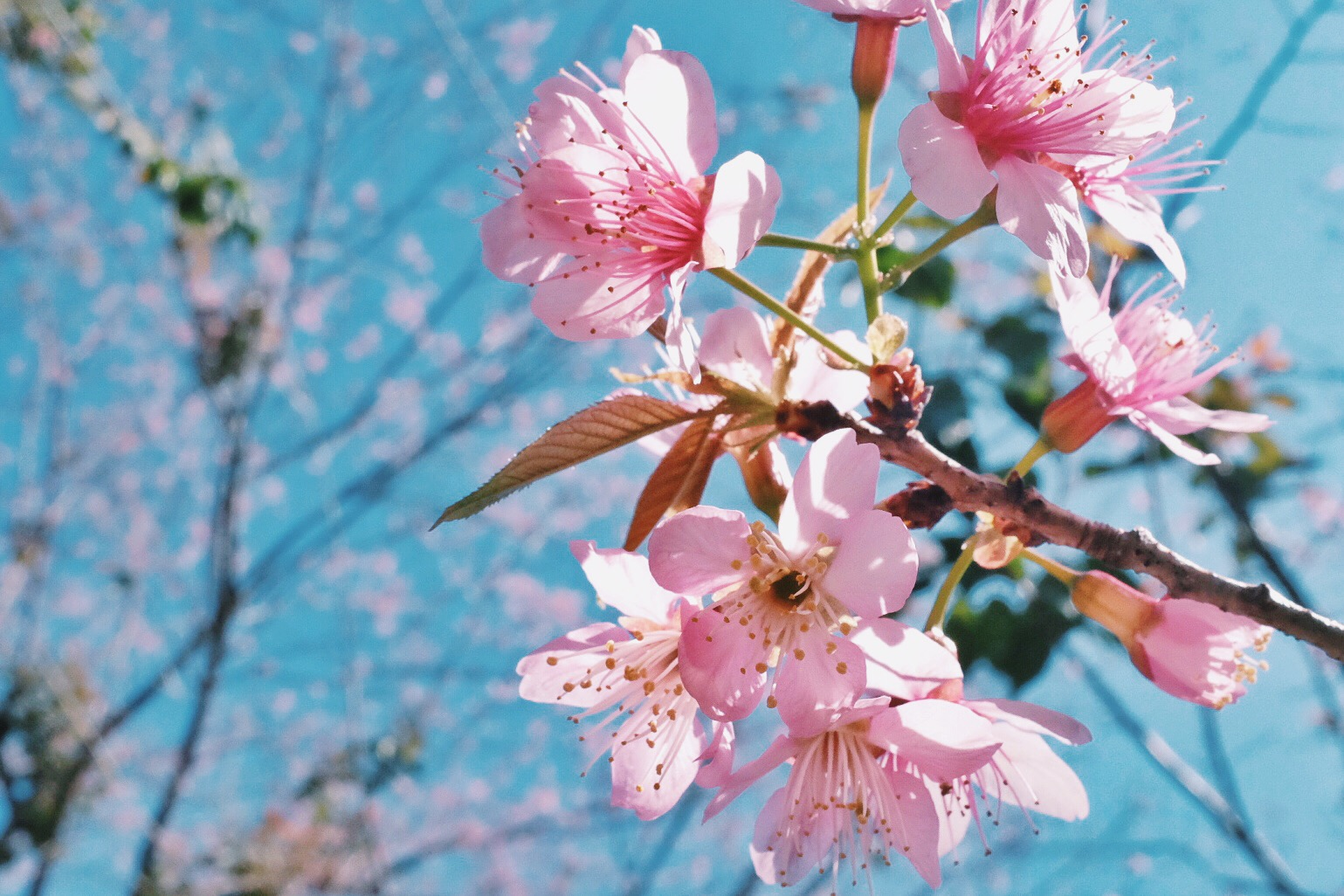
Paiyya (Prunus cerasoides)

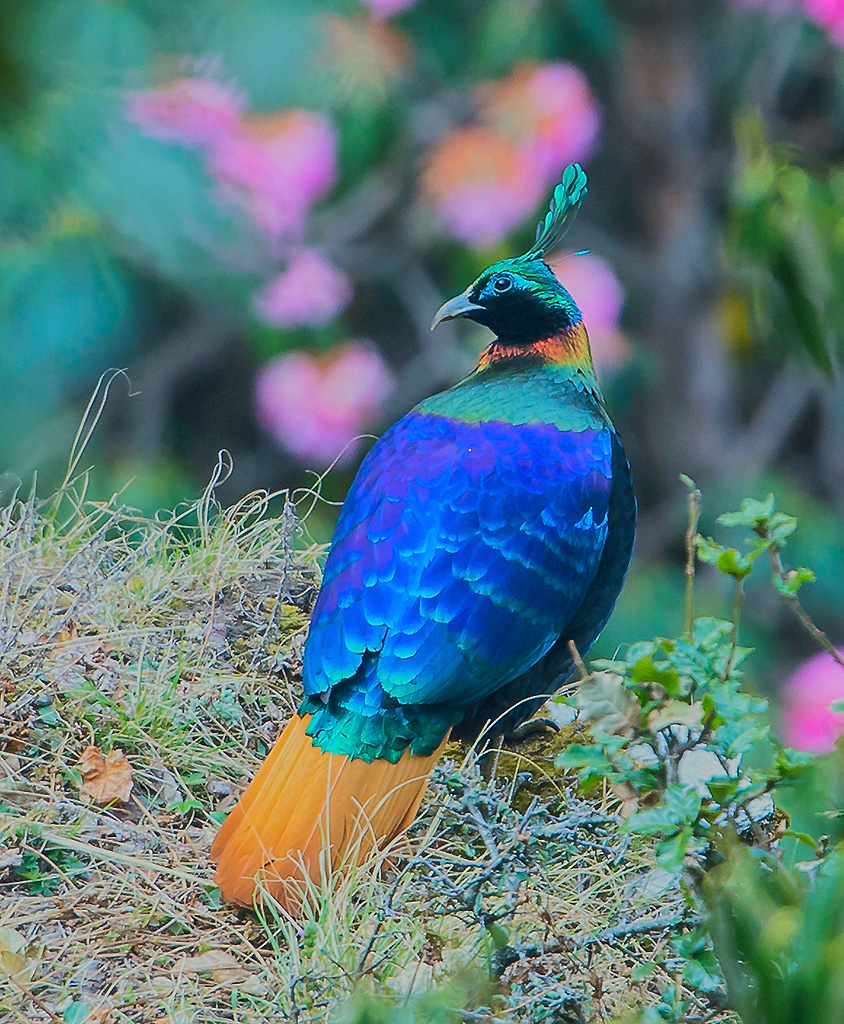
Himalayan Monal (Lophophorus impejanus)

== Demographics ==
Historical population
| Year | Pop. | ±% |
|---|---|---|
| 1901 | 1,979,866 | — |
| 1911 | 2,142,258 | +8.2% |
| 1921 | 2,115,984 | −1.2% |
| 1931 | 2,301,019 | +8.7% |
| 1941 | 2,614,540 | +13.6% |
| 1951 | 2,945,929 | +12.7% |
| 1961 | 3,610,938 | +22.6% |
| 1971 | 4,492,724 | +24.4% |
| 1981 | 5,725,972 | +27.4% |
| 1991 | 7,050,634 | +23.1% |
| 2001 | 8,489,349 | +20.4% |
| 2011 | 10,086,292 | +18.8% |
Source: Census of India

The native people of Uttarakhand are generally called Uttarakhandi and sometimes specifically either Garhwali or Kumaoni depending on their place of origin in either the Garhwal or Kumaon region. According to the 2011 Census of India, Uttarakhand has a population of 10,086,292 comprising 5,137,773 males and 4,948,519 females, with 69.77% of the population living in rural areas. The state is the 20th most populous state of the country having 0.83% of the population on 1.63% of the land. The population density of the state is 189 people per square kilometre having a 2001–2011 decadal growth rate of 18.81%. The gender ratio is 963 females per 1000 males. The crude birth rate in the state is 18.6 with the total fertility rate being 2.3. The state has an infant mortality rate of 43, a maternal mortality rate of 188 and a crude death rate of 6.6.

=== Social groups ===
Uttarakhand has a multiethnic population spread across two geocultural regions: Garhwal, and Kumaon, including members of the native Garhwali and Kumaoni communities as well as migrant groups, dominated by the Rajput-Brahmin hegemony. Rajputs (of various clans) constitute around 35% of the state's population, followed by Brahmins at 20% to 25%, According to a 2007 study by Centre for the Study of Developing Societies, Uttarakhand has the highest percentage of Brahmins of any state in India, with approximately 20% of the population. Uttarakhand is among the few Indian states where the historic Upper Caste forms a major share of the population.

Of the rest 18.3% of the population is classified as Other Backward Classes (OBCs) Gurjars majorly. 18.76% of the population belongs to the Scheduled Castes (an official term for the lower castes in the traditional caste system in India). Scheduled Tribes such as the Jaunsaris, Bhotiyas, Tharus, Buksas, Rajis, Jads, and Banrawats constitute 2.89% of the population. Several non-scheduled tribal groups such as Shaukas and Gurjars are also found here. Van Gurjars (found in Shivalik hills) and Bhotiya are nomadic tribes while Jaunsaris are completely settled tribe.

=== Languages ===
The official language of Uttarakhand is Hindi, which according to the 2011 census is spoken natively by 43% of the population, and is also used throughout the state as a lingua franca.

The major regional languages of Uttarakhand are Garhwali, which according to the 2011 census is spoken by 23% of the population, mostly in the western half of the state, Kumaoni, spoken in the eastern half and native to 20%, and Jaunsari, whose speakers are concentrated in Dehradun district in the southwest and make up 1.3% of the state's population. These three languages are closely related, with Garhwali and Kumaoni in particular making up the Central Pahari language subgroup. The languages have been part of various scattered conservation efforts due to their active decline beginning in the later quarter of the 20th century. The decline is hypothesized to be the result of heavy state-sponsored promotion of Hindi as the official language.

All the languages enumerated so far belong to the Indo-Aryan family. Apart from a few other minority Indo-Aryan languages, like Buksa Tharu and Rana Tharu (of Udham Singh Nagar district in the south-east), Mahasu Pahari (found in Uttarkashi in the north-west), and Doteli, Uttarakhand is also home to a number of indigenous Sino-Tibetan languages, most of which are spoken in the north of the state. These include Jad (spoken in Uttarkashi district in the north-west), Rongpo (of Chamoli district), and several languages of Pithoragarh district in the north-east: Byangsi, Chaudangsi, Darmiya, Raji and Rawat. Another indigenous Sino-Tibetan language, Rangas, became extinct by the middle of the 20th century. Additionally, two non-indigenous Sino-Tibetan languages are also represented: Kulung (otherwise native to Nepal) and Tibetan.

The Indian classical language Sanskrit has been declared a second official language, by the BJP government for its allegedly historic association with the region.

There are also sizeable populations of speakers of some of India's other major languages: Urdu (4.2%) and Punjabi (2.6%), both mostly found in the southern districts, Bengali (1.5%) and Bhojpuri (0.95%), both mainly present in Udham Singh Nagar district in the south-east, and Nepali (1.1%, found throughout the state, but most notably in Dehradun and Uttarkashi).

Uttarakhand: mother-tongue of population, according to the 2011 Census.
| Mother tongue code | Mother tongue | People | Percentage |
|---|---|---|---|
| 002007 | Bengali | 150,893 | 1.5% |
| 006102 | Bhojpuri | 95,330 | 0.9% |
| 006195 | Garhwali | 2,322,406 | 23.0% |
| 006240 | Hindi | 4,373,951 | 43.4% |
| 006265 | Jaunsari | 135,698 | 1.3% |
| 006340 | Kumaoni | 2,011,286 | 19.9% |
| 006439 | Pahari | 16,984 | 0.2% |
| 010014 | Tharu | 48,286 | 0.5% |
| 013071 | Marathi | 5,989 | 0.1% |
| 014011 | Nepali | 106,394 | 1.1% |
| 016038 | Punjabi | 263,258 | 2.6% |
| 022015 | Urdu | 425,461 | 4.2% |
| 031001 | Bhoti | 9,207 | 0.1% |
| 046003 | Halam | 5,995 | 0.1% |
| 053005 | Gujari | 9,470 | 0.1% |
| 115008 | Tibetan | 10,125 | 0.1% |
| – | Others | 95,559 | 0.9% |
| Total | | 10,086,292 | 100.0% |

=== Religion ===
Religion in Uttarakhand (2011)
1. Hinduism (83.0%)
2. Islam (13.9%)
3. Sikhism (2.34%)
4. Christianity (0.37%)
5. Buddhism (0.15%)
6. Jainism (0.09%)
7. Other or not stated (0.13%)

More than four-fifths of Uttarakhand's residents are Hindus. Muslims, Sikhs, Christians, Buddhists, and Jains make up the remaining population, with the Muslims being the largest minority. Hill regions are almost entirely Hindu, while the plains regions have a significant minority of Muslims and Sikhs.

== Administrative divisions ==
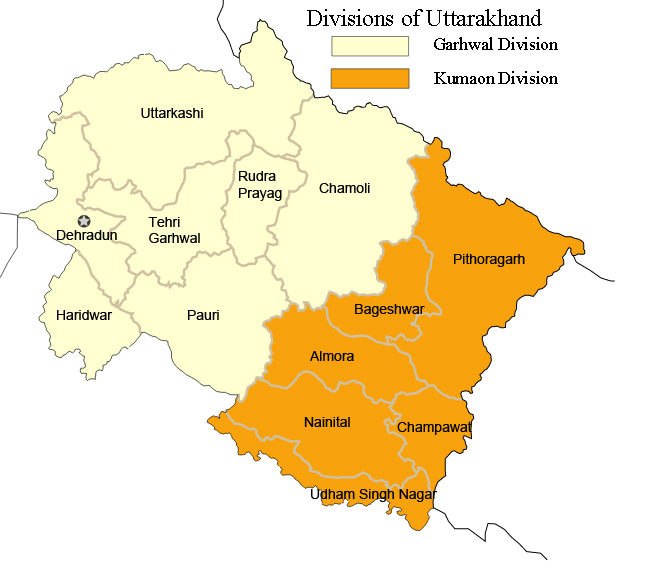
Kumaon and Garhwal in Uttarakhand

Uttarakhand is divided into 13 districts under two divisions viz. Kumaon and Garhwal. Each division is administered by a divisional commissioner. Four new districts named Didihat, Kotdwar, Ranikhet, and Yamunotri were declared by then Chief Minister of Uttarakhand, Ramesh Pokhriyal, on 15 August 2011 but yet to be officially formed.

Population by divisions & districts
| Division | Districts | Population (as of 2011) |
|---|---|---|
| Garhwal division | Chamoli | 391,605 |
| Garhwal division | Dehradun | 1,696,694 |
| Garhwal division | Pauri Garhwal | 687,271 |
| Garhwal division | Rudraprayag | 242,285 |
| Garhwal division | Tehri Garhwal | 618,931 |
| Garhwal division | Uttarkashi | 330,086 |
| Garhwal division | Haridwar | 1,890,422 |
| Garhwal division total | | 5,857,294 |
| Kumaon division | Almora | 622,506 |
| Kumaon division | Bageshwar | 259,898 |
| Kumaon division | Champawat | 259,648 |
| Kumaon division | Nainital | 954,605 |
| Kumaon division | Pithoragarh | 483,439 |
| Kumaon division | Udham Singh Nagar | 1,648,902 |
| Kumaon division total | | 4,229,998 |
| Uttarakhand state total | | 10,087,292 |

Each district is administered by a district magistrate. The districts are further divided into sub-divisions, which are administered by sub-divisional magistrates; sub-divisions comprise tehsils which are administered by a tehsildar and community development blocks, each administered by a block development officer.

Urban areas are categorised into three types of municipalities based on their population; municipal corporations, each administered by a municipal commissioner, municipal councils and, nagar panchayats (town councils), each of them administered by a chief executive officer. Rural areas comprise the three tier administration; district councils, block panchayats (block councils) and gram panchayats (village councils). All state and local government offices have a five-year term.

According to the 2011 census, Dehradun, and Udham Singh Nagar are the most populous districts, each of them having a population of over one million.

== Government and administration ==
Following the Constitution of India, Uttarakhand, like all Indian states, has a parliamentary system of representative democracy. The Legislative Assembly is unicameral consists of 70 members who are elected for five-year terms. Assembly meetings are presided over by the Speaker, or the Deputy Speaker in the Speaker's absence. The Uttarakhand Council of Ministers is appointed by the Governor of Uttarakhand on the advice of the Chief Minister of Uttarakhand and reports to the Legislative Assembly. Leader of the Opposition leads the Official Opposition in the Legislative Assembly. The state contributes five seats to Lok Sabha, the lower house of the Indian Parliament, and three seats to Rajya Sabha, the upper house.

The Government of Uttarakhand is a democratically elected body in India with the governor as its constitutional head and is appointed by the president of India for a five-year term. The leader of the party or coalition with a majority in the Legislative Assembly is appointed as the chief minister by the governor, and the council of ministers is appointed by the governor on the advice of the chief minister. The governor remains a ceremonial head of the state, while the chief minister and his council are responsible for day-to-day government functions. The Council of Ministers consists of Cabinet Ministers and Ministers of State (MoS). The Secretariat headed by the Chief Secretary assists the council of ministers. The Chief Secretary is also the administrative head of the government. Each government department is headed by a minister, who is assisted by an Additional Chief Secretary or a Principal Secretary, who is usually an officer of Indian Administrative Service (IAS), the Additional Chief Secretary/Principal Secretary serves as the administrative head of the department they are assigned to. Each department also has officers of the rank of Secretary, Special Secretary, Joint Secretary etc. assisting the Minister and the Additional Chief Secretary/Principal Secretary.

For administration, the state is divided into two divisions and 13 districts. Divisional Commissioner, an IAS officer is the head of administration on the divisional level. The administration in each district is headed by a District Magistrate, who is also an IAS officer, and is assisted by several officers belonging to state services. District Magistrate being the head of the district administration, is responsible for maintaining law and order and providing public services in the district. At the block level, the Block Development Officer (BDO) is responsible for the overall development of the block. The Uttarakhand Police is headed by an IPS officer of the rank of Director general of police. A Superintendent of Police, an IPS officer assisted by the officers of the Uttarakhand Police Service, is entrusted with the responsibility of maintaining law and order and related issues in each district. The Divisional Forest Officer, an officer belonging to the Indian Forest Service manages the forests, environment, and wildlife of the district, assisted by the officers of Uttarakhand Forest Service and Uttarakhand Forest Subordinate Service.

The judiciary capital of the state is Nainital, the seat of the Uttarakhand High Court, with district courts and session courts in each district or Sessions Division, and lower courts at the tehsil level. The president of India appoints the chief justice of the High Court of the Uttarakhand judiciary on the advice of the Chief Justice of the Supreme Court of India as well as the governor of Uttarakhand.

== Culture ==
=== Architecture and crafts ===
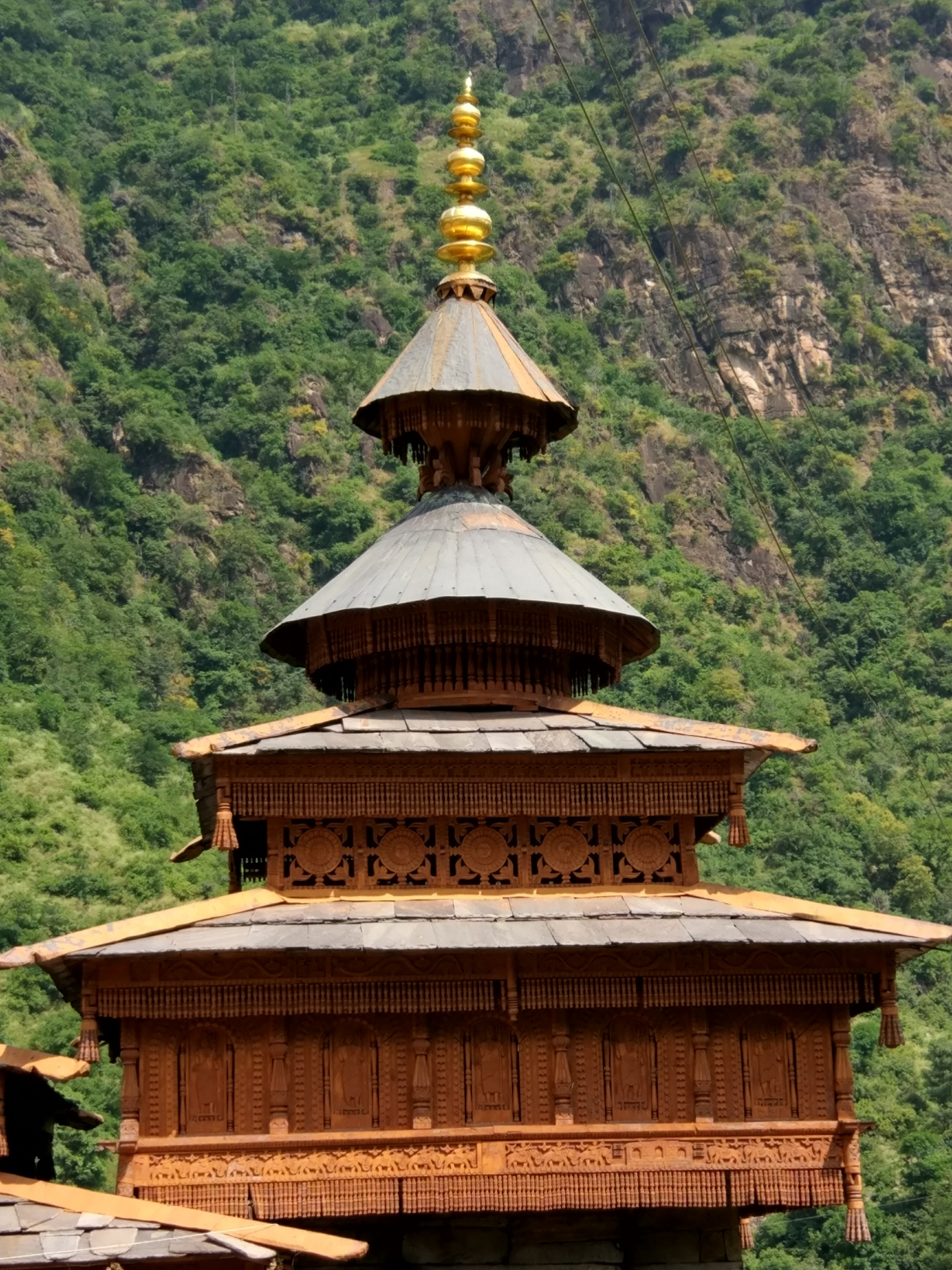
Mahasu Devta Temple at Hanol, notable for its traditional wooden architecture

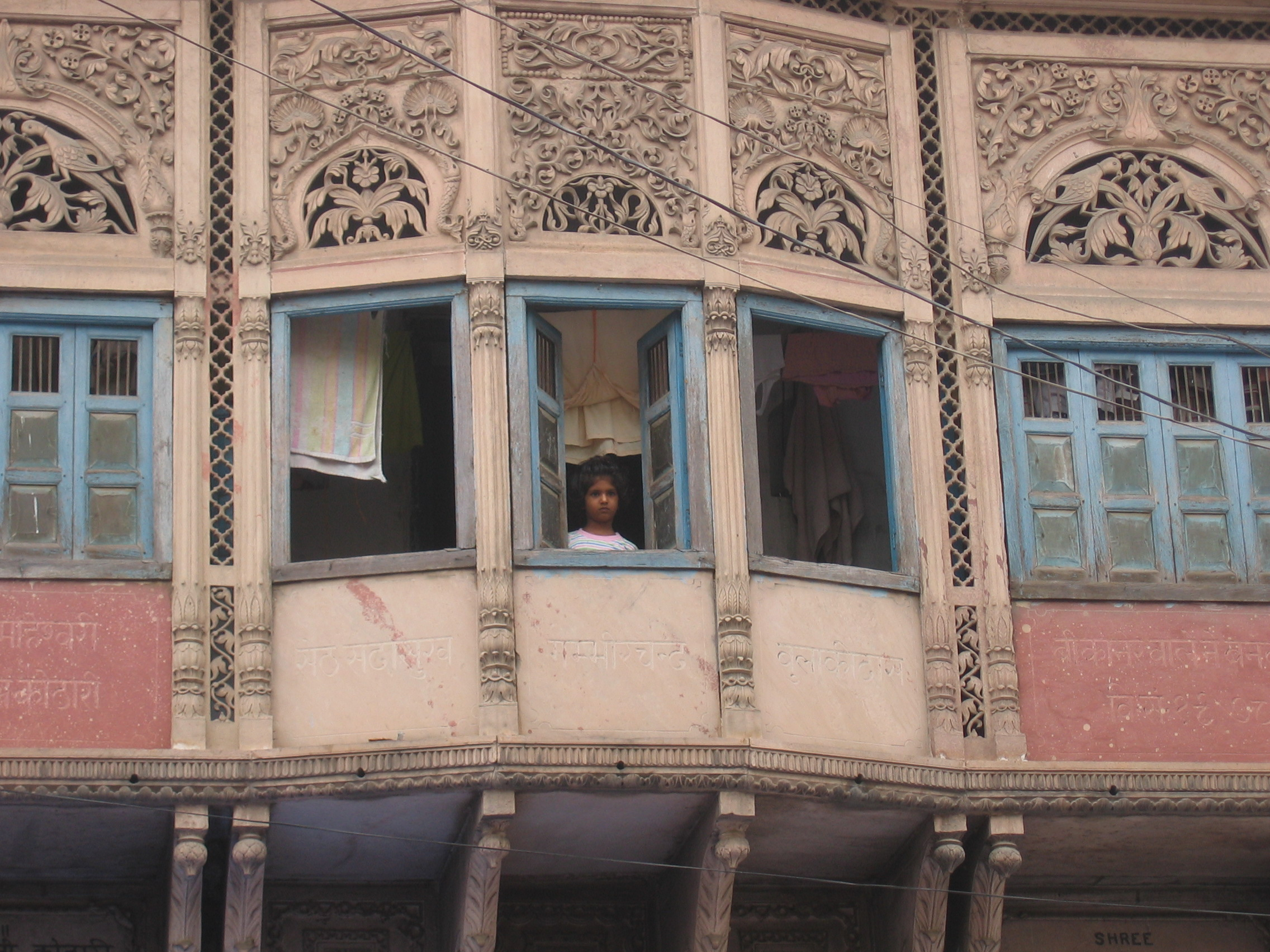
Architectural details of a Dharamshala, established 1822, Haridwar

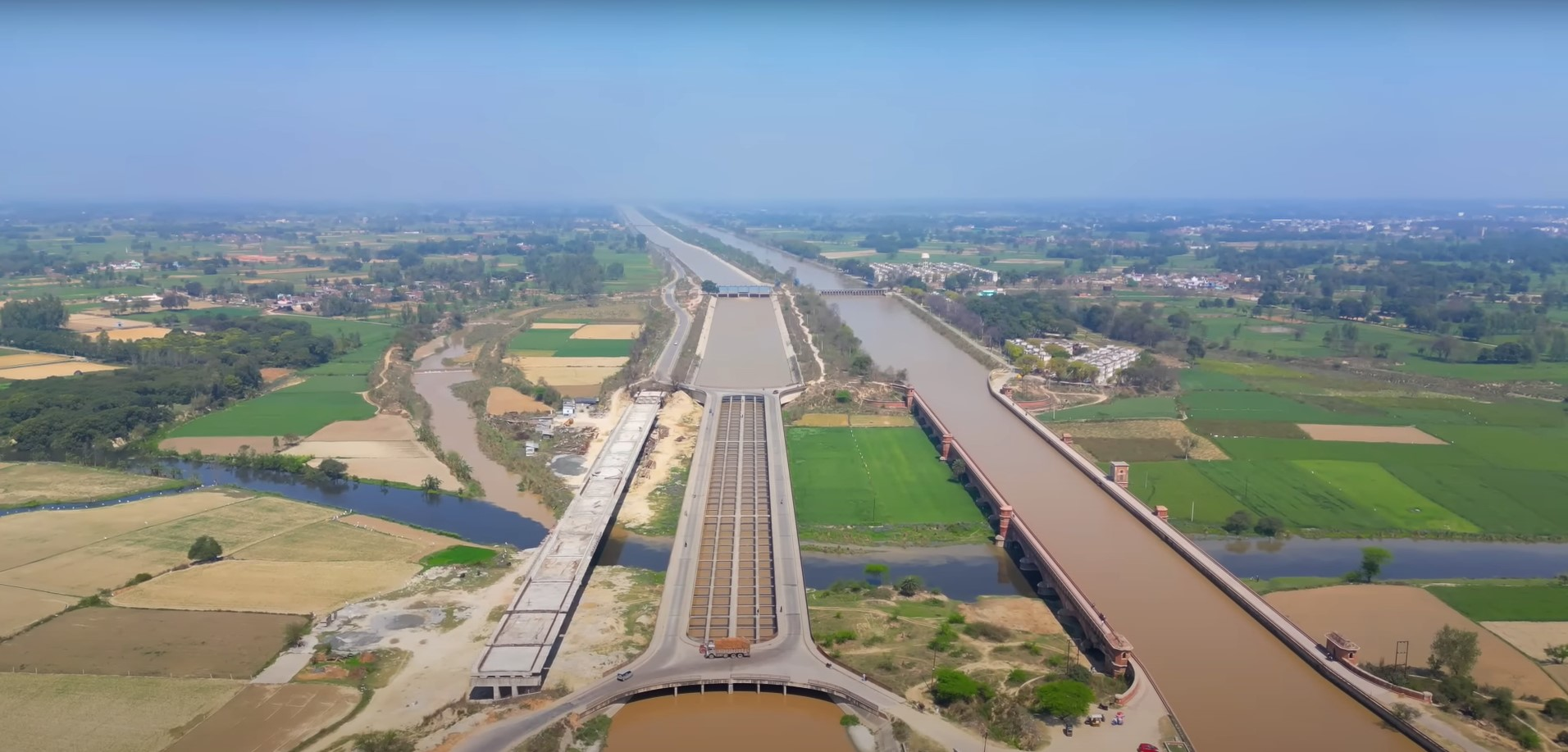
Solani aqueduct on Ganges Canal at Roorkee, built during the British Raj

The releasing of the Uttaranchal crafts map

Among the prominent local crafts is wood carving known as Likhai, which appears most frequently in the ornately decorated temples of the Kumaon region in Uttarakhand. Intricately carved designs of floral patterns, deities, and geometrical motifs also decorate the doors, windows, ceilings, and walls of village houses. Paintings and murals are used to decorate both houses and temples.

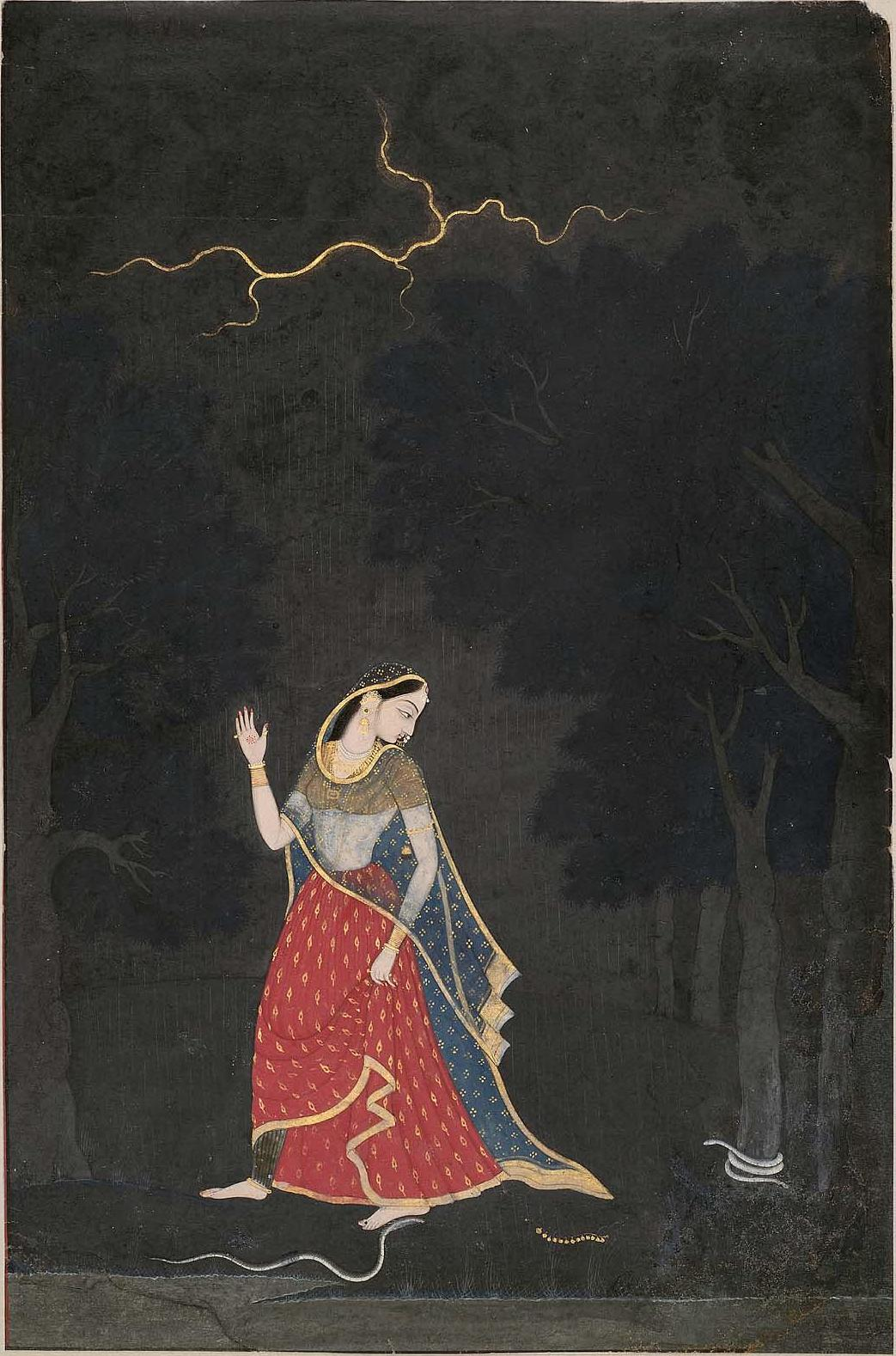
Abhisarika Nayika, a painting by Mola Ram

Garwhali Miniature painting is a form of miniature painting that flourished in the region between the 17th and 19th century. Mola Ram is credited as the true father of the Garhwali Branch of the wider Pahari School. Kumaoni art often is geometrical in nature, while Garhwali art is known for its closeness to nature.

Aipan is a GI certified Kumaoni ritual folk art done mainly during special ceremonies, the festival of Diwali, marriages and other religious rituals. Its predominantly female practitioners believe that it invokes a divine power which brings about good fortune and deters evil. The art is special as it is done on empty walls, which are brick-red in colour, called geru. The actual art is done with a white paste made of rice flour.

Jyuti patta is a class of water color paintings done on rituals, called Jyuti. Some scholars also consider Jyuti to be synonymous with the word mother of the world. To give concrete form to the deity, two-dimensional geometry is given expression in the form of frescoes. This is a geometric or decorative semi-graphic structure in which different colours and symbols are used. This structure called Jyuti also gets a new dimension by the use of ochre or biswar of Tepan. Jyunti is prepared on the surface of wall or paper and the composition is given with cotton and a brush of limiter. In this artform, various qualities of a specific deity are shown.

Other crafts of Uttarakhand include handcrafted gold jewellery, basketry from Garhwal, woollen shawls, scarves, and rugs. The latter are mainly produced by the Bhotiyas of northern Uttarakhand.

=== Arts and literature ===
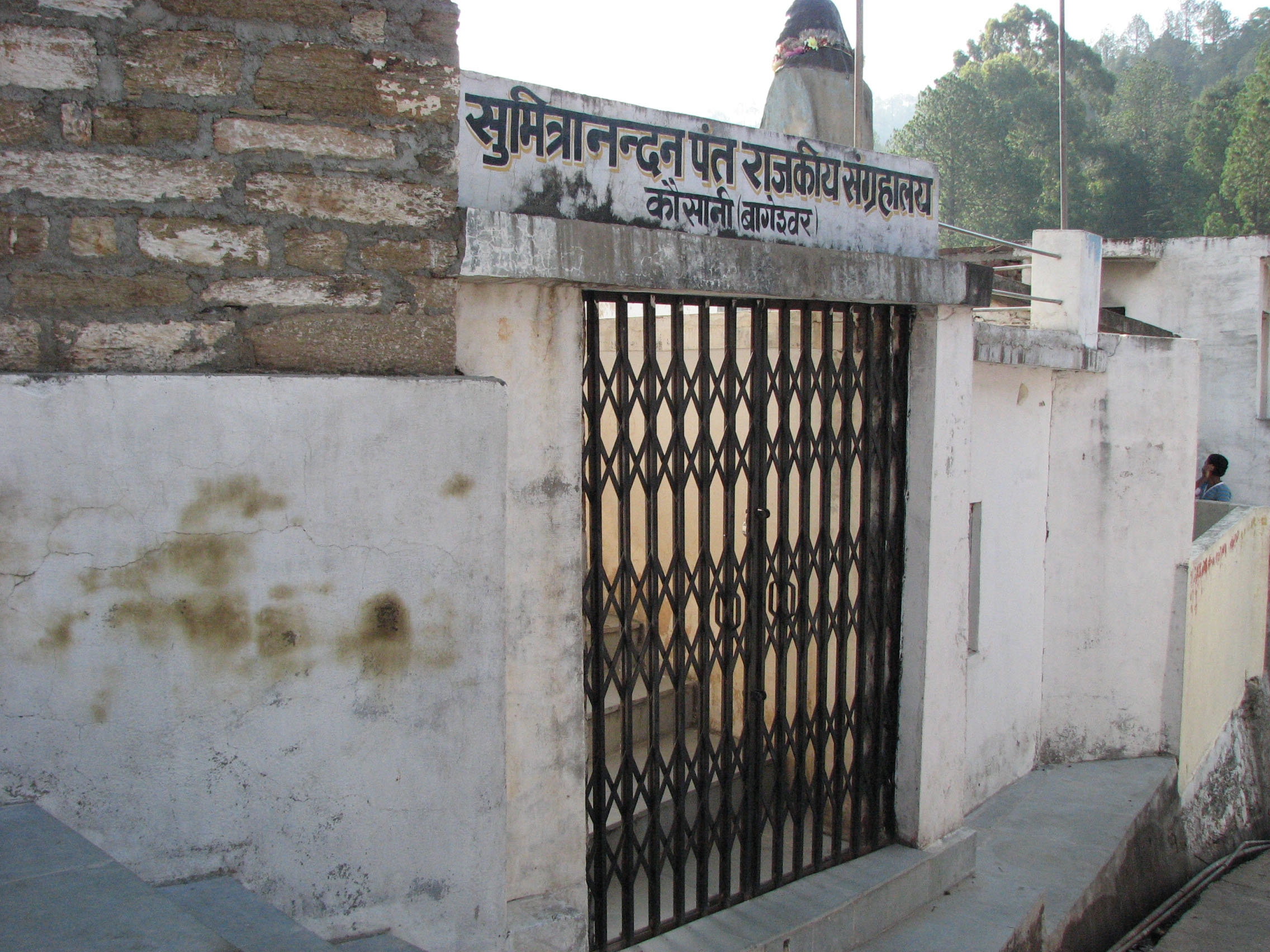
Sumitranandan Pant Museum, Kausani

Uttarakhand's diverse ethnicities have created a rich literary tradition in languages including Hindi, Garhwali, Kumaoni, Jaunsari, and Tharu. Many of its traditional tales originated in the form of lyrical ballads and chanted by itinerant singers and are now considered classics of Hindi literature. Abodh Bandhu Bahuguna, Badri Datt Pandey, Ganga Prasad Vimal; Mohan Upreti, Naima Khan Upreti, Prasoon Joshi, Shailesh Matiyani, Shekhar Joshi, Shivani, Taradutt Gairola, Tom Alter; Lalit Kala Akademi fellow – Ranbir Singh Bisht; Sangeet Natak Akademi Awardees – B. M. Shah, Narendra Singh Negi; Sahitya Akademi Awardees – Leeladhar Jagudi, Shivprasad Dabral Charan, Manglesh Dabral, Manohar Shyam Joshi, Ramesh Chandra Shah, Ruskin Bond and Viren Dangwal; Jnanpith Awardee and Sahitya Akademi fellow Sumitranandan Pant are some major literary, artistic and theatre personalities from the state. prominent philosophers, Indian independence activists and social-environmental activists; Anil Prakash Joshi, Basanti Devi, Gaura Devi, Govind Ballabh Pant, Chandi Prasad Bhatt, Deep Joshi, Hargovind Pant, Kalu Singh Mahara, Kunwar Singh Negi, Mukandi Lal, Nagendra Saklani, Sri Dev Suman, Ram Prasad Nautiyal, Sunderlal Bahuguna and Vandana Shiva are also from Uttarakhand.

=== Cuisine ===
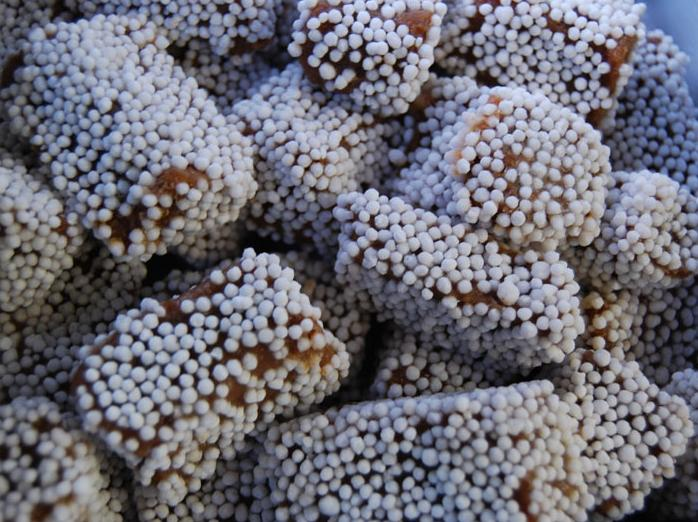
Bal Mithai, a popular sweet from Kumaon

The primary food of Uttarakhand is vegetables with wheat being a staple, although non-vegetarian food is also served. A distinctive characteristic of Uttarakhand cuisine is the sparing use of tomatoes, milk, and milk-based products.

Coarse grain with high fibre content is very common in Uttarakhand due to the harsh terrain. Crops most commonly associated with Uttarakhand are Buckwheat (locally called Kotu or Kuttu) and the regional crops, Maduwa and Jhangora, particularly in the interior regions of Kumaon and Garhwal. Generally, either Desi Ghee or Mustard oil is used for the purpose of cooking food. Simple recipes are made interesting with the use of hash seeds Jakhya as spice, chutney made of Bhang is also a regional cuisine.

Bal Mithai is a popular fudge-like sweet. Other popular dishes include Dubuk, Chains, Kap, Bhatiya, Jaula, Phana, Paliyo, Chutkani and Sei. In sweets; Swal, Ghughut/Khajur, Arsa, Mishri, Gatta and Gulgulas are popular.

Many regional variations of Kadhi called Jhoi or Jholi is also popular. Another staple of the Kumaon region is a black soybean dal referred to as Bhatt or chudkani. A grinded dal chaisu is also popular in the Garhwal region.

The state has a predominant non-vegetarian population, with some estimates suggesting 75% of the population being non-vegetarian. Various boar, chicken, mutton and hare recipes are popular in the region. A popular mutton dish bhutwa, is made from goat intestine and other offcuts.

=== Dances and music ===
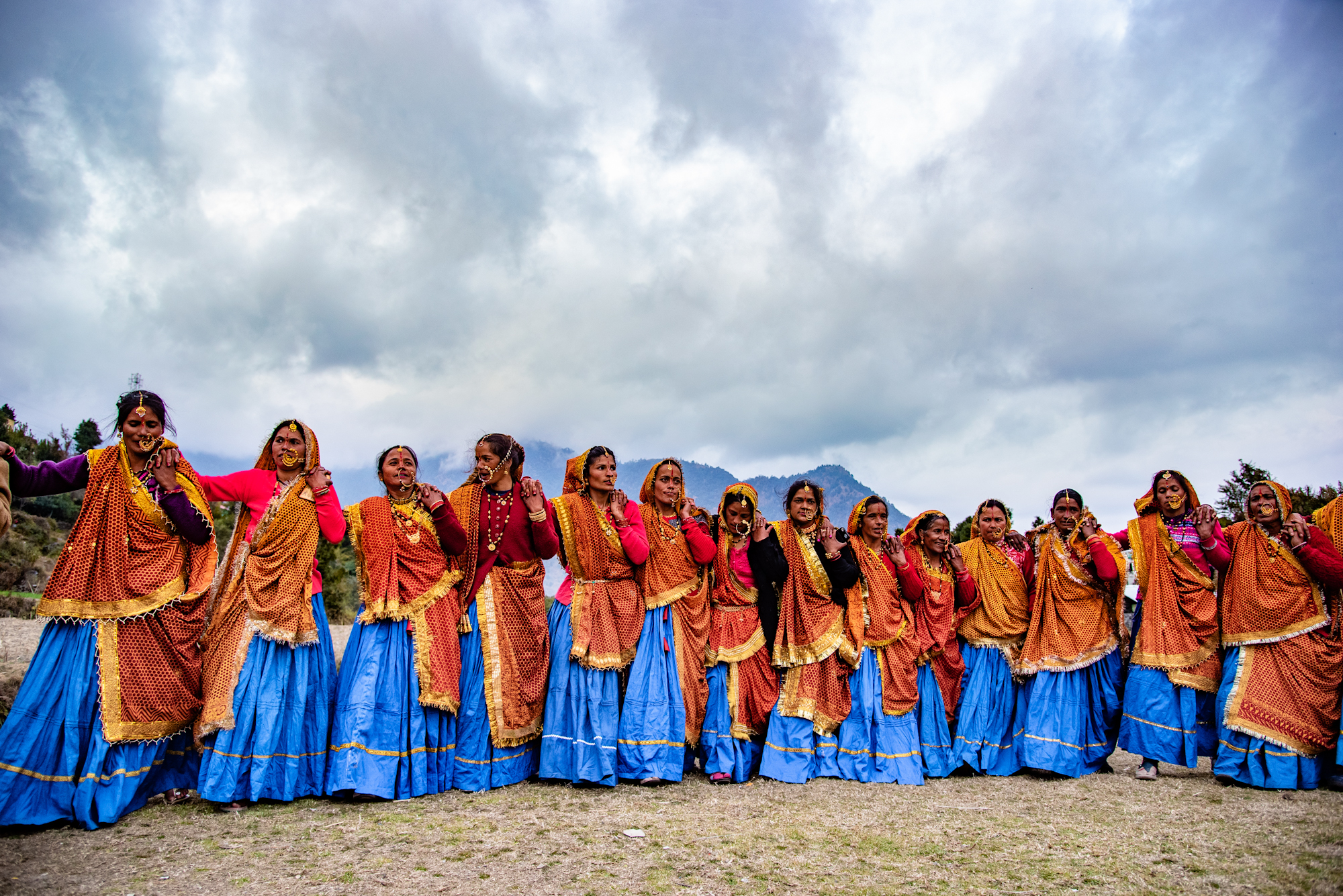
Women performing chanchari, a popular folk dance from Danpur region in Kumaon

The dances of the region are connected to life and human existence and exhibit myriad human emotions. Langvir Nritya is a dance form for males that resembles gymnastic movements. Barada Nati folk dance is another dance of Jaunsar-Bawar, which is practised during some religious festivals. Other well-known dances include Hurka Baul, Jhora-Chanchri, Chhapeli, Thadya, Jhumaila, Pandav, Chauphula, and Chholiya.

Music is an integral part of the Uttarakhandi culture. Popular types of folk songs include Mangal, Basanti, Khuder and Chhopati. These folk songs are played on instruments including Dhol, Damau, Turri, Ransingha, Dholki, Daur, Thali, Bhankora, Mandan and Mashakbaja. "Bedu Pako Baro Masa" is a popular folk song of Uttarakhand with international fame and legendary status within the state. It serves as the cultural anthem of Uttarakhandi people worldwide.

Music is also used as a medium through which the gods are invoked. Jagar is a form of spirit worship in which the singer, or Jagariya, sings a ballad of the gods, the ballads evoke local deities with allusions to great epics, like Mahabharat and Ramayana, that describe the adventures and exploits of the god being invoked.

B. K. Samant, Basanti Bisht, Chander Singh Rahi, Girish Tiwari 'Girda', Gopal Babu Goswami, Heera Singh Rana, Jeet Singh Negi, Meena Rana, Mohan Upreti, Narendra Singh Negi and Pritam Bhartwan are popular folk singers and musicians from the state, so are Bollywood singer Jubin Nautiyal and country singer Bobby Cash.

=== Fairs and festivals ===
The festivals of Kumbh Mela at Haridwar, Ramlila, Ramman of Garhwal, the traditions of Vedic chantings and Yoga are included in the list of Intangible cultural heritage of the UNESCO.

- Kumauni Holi, in forms including Baithki Holi, Khari Holi, and Mahila Holi, all of which start from Vasant Panchami, are festivals and musical affairs that can last almost a month.
- Almora Dussehra is a regional variant of Dussehra, dating back to 1936. It is distinct for burning fifteen distinct effigies, each representing the members of the Hindu mythological villain Ravana's entire bloodline. The effigies are all ornate and exquisitely designed. They are paraded through the city of Almora before finally being set on fire to symbolise the triumph of good over evil.
- Ramman is an agro-religious festival and ritual masked theatre endemic to the Garhwali People in the Saloor Dungra village of the Painkhanda Valley in the Chamoli district. The festival serves as an offering to the village deity, Bhumichetrapal or Bhumiyal Devta, in the courtyard of the village temple. Every day of the festival, the Devta takes a round of the village. The festival lasts for ten days during which time the local epic of Rama is sung and masked dances depicting different aspects of life take place in the courtyard of the Bhumiyal Devta's temple.

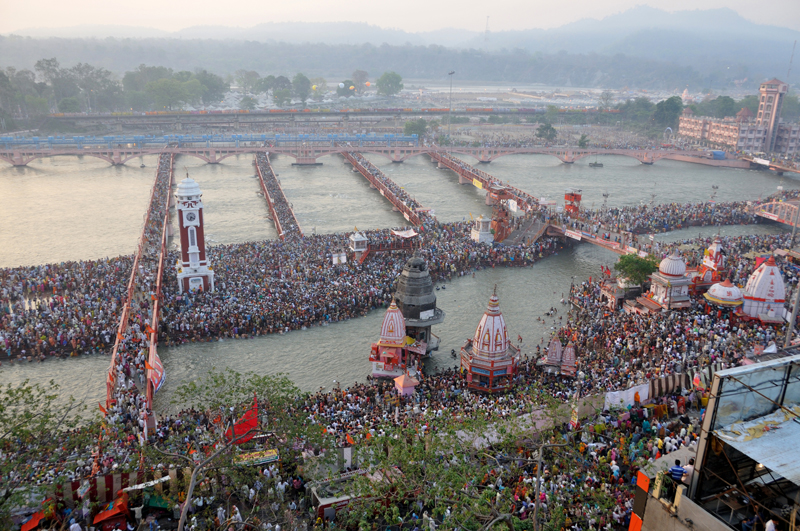
Pilgrims gather for the third Shahi Snan ("royal bath") at Har Ki Pauri in Haridwar, Uttarakhand on 14 April 2010 during Haridwar Kumbh Mela.

- Haridwar Kumbh Mela, one of the major Hindu pilgrimages, takes place in Uttarakhand. Haridwar is one of the four places in India where this mela is organised. Haridwar most recently hosted the Purna Kumbh Mela from Makar Sankranti (14 January 2010) to Vaishakh Purnima Snan (28 April 2010). Hundreds of foreigners joined Indian pilgrims in the festival, which is considered the largest religious gathering in the world.
- Phool-Dei is a folk festival which welcomes the spring season in the state. The festival is celebrated on the first day of the Hindu month, Chaitra. In some places, the festival is celebrated as carnival and the celebration goes on for a month. The term 'Dei' refers to a ceremonial pudding which is the key food in this festival that is made from jaggery. White flour and curd are also offered. Young children gather together and go to every house in their village/towns with plates full of rice, jaggery, coconut, green leaves, and flowers. In return, they are presented with blessings and gifts like sweets, jaggery, and money. The wishing and blessing part also include placing flowers and rice on the doorsteps of the houses by the children. People of village sing and dance on their folk songs to celebrate the festival of spring along with exchanging wishes for well-being and prosperity of their family and relatives.
- Harela is a kumaoni festival hypothesized to date back to the indigenous population. 10–11 days before the Sankranti of Shravan, a bed is made by adding soil in bamboo pots etc. Grains grown during the rainy season like paddy, maize, urad etc. are sown, this is called Hariyala. Harakali Mahotsav, Idols of Gauri Maheshwar, Ganesha and Karkitkeya are made from clay, coloured in them and worshiped with various fruits, flowers, dishes and sweets in a bed of greenery on the night of the month of Sanat. On the second day, the Harela of Uttarang Puja is placed on the head. Sisters and daughters-in-law apply tilak and tilak and put Harela on their heads. They are given gifts.
- Ganga Dussehra, Vasant Panchami, Makar Sankranti, Ghee Sankranti, Khatarua, Vat Savitri, and Phul Dei (The festival of spring) are other major festivals. In addition, various fairs like Kanwar Yatra, Kandali Festival, Ramman, Kauthig, Nauchandi Mela, Giddi Mela, Uttarayani Mela and Nanda Devi Raj Jat take place.

== Economy ==
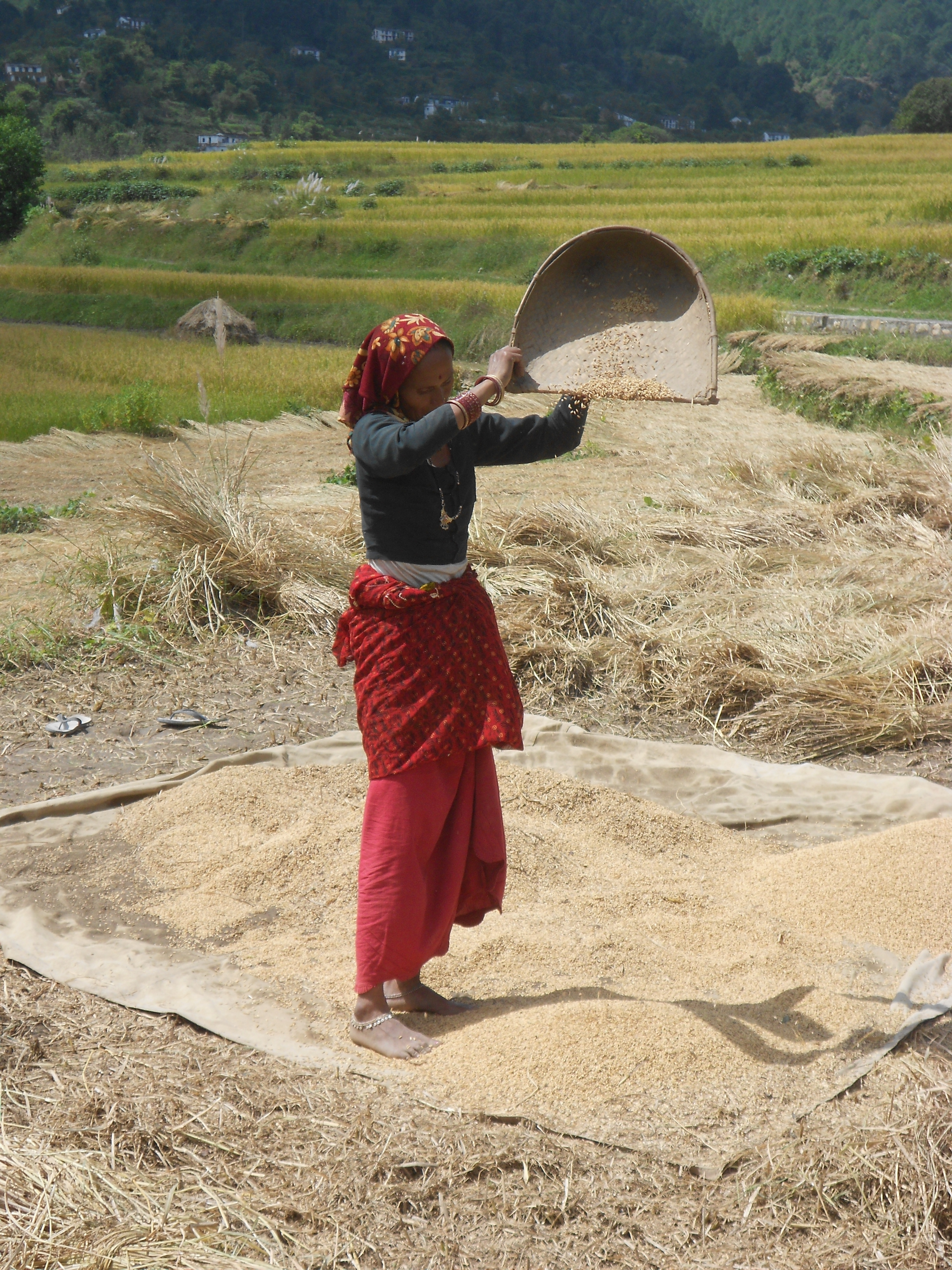
A woman winnowing rice, an important food crop in Uttarakhand

The Uttarakhand state is the second fastest growing state in India. Its gross state domestic product (GSDP) (at constant prices) more than doubled from ₹24,786 crore in FY2005 to ₹60,898 crore in FY2012. The real GSDP grew at 13.7% (CAGR) during the FY2005–FY2012 period. The contribution of the service sector to the GSDP of Uttarakhand was just over 50% during FY 2012. Per capita income in Uttarakhand is ₹ 198738 (FY 2018–19), which is higher than the national average of ₹ 126406 (FY 2018–19). According to the Reserve Bank of India, the total foreign direct investment in the state from April 2000 to October 2009 amounted to US$46.7 million.

Like most of India, agriculture is one of the most significant sectors of the economy of Uttarakhand. Basmati rice, wheat, soybeans, groundnuts, coarse cereals, pulses, and oil seeds are the most widely grown crops. Fruits like apples, oranges, pears, peaches, lychees, and plums are widely grown and important to the large food processing industry. Agricultural export zones have been set up in the state for lychees, horticulture, herbs, medicinal plants, and basmati rice. During 2010, wheat production was 831 thousand tonnes and rice production was 610 thousand tonnes, while the main cash crop of the state, sugarcane, had a production of 5058 thousand tonnes. As 86% of the state consists of hills, the yield per hectare is not very high. 86% of all croplands are in the plains while the remaining is from the hills. The state also holds the GI tag for Tejpatta (Cinnamomum tamala) or Indian bay leaf, which is known to add flavour to dishes and also possesses several medicinal properties.

Economy of Uttarakhand at a Ggance (figures in crores of Indian rupees)
| Economy at a glance (FY-2012) | In Indian rupees |
| GSDP (current) | ₹95,201 |
| Per capita income | ₹103,000 |

Other key industries include tourism and hydropower, and there is prospective development in IT, ITES, biotechnology, pharmaceuticals and automobile industries. The service sector of Uttarakhand mainly includes tourism, information technology, higher education, and banking.

During 2005–2006, the state successfully developed three Integrated Industrial Estates (IIEs) at Haridwar, Pantnagar, and Sitarganj; Pharma City at Selakui; Information Technology Park at Sahastradhara (Dehradun); and a growth centre at Sigaddi (Kotdwar). Also in 2006, 20 industrial sectors in public private partnership mode were developed in the state.

== Transportation ==
Uttarakhand has 2,683 km (1,667 mi) of roads, of which 1,328 km (825 mi) are national highways and 1,543 km (959 mi) are state highways. The state has 14 national highways, comprising 2.2% of the total national highways length in India. The Uttarakhand Transport Corporation (UTC), established on 31 October 2003 after reorganising the State Road Transport Corporation (SRTC). The corporation provides transportation in the state with connecting services to adjoining states. The UTC buses are the most common and affordable mode of transportation in Uttarakhand. As of 2012, approximately 1000 buses are being plied by the UTC on 35 nationalised routes along with many other non-nationalised routes. There are also private transport operators operating approximately 3000 buses on non-nationalised routes along with a few interstate routes in Uttarakhand and the neighbouring state of Uttar Pradesh. For travelling locally, the state, like most of the country, has auto rickshaws and cycle rickshaws. In addition, remote towns and villages in the hills are connected to important road junctions and bus routes by share mode of transportation.

As over 86% of state's terrain consists of hills, railway services are very limited in the state and are largely confined to the plains. In 2011, the total length of railway tracks was about 345 km (214 mi). The most important railway station in Kumaun Division of Uttarakhand is at Kathgodam. Kathgodam is the last terminus of the broad-gauge line of North East Railways that connects Nainital with Delhi, Dehradun, and Howrah. Other notable railway stations are at Pantnagar, Lalkuan and Haldwani. Dehradun railway station is a railhead of the Northern Railways. Haridwar station is situated on the Delhi–Dehradun and Howrah–Dehradun railway lines. One of the main railheads of the Northern Railways, Haridwar Junction Railway Station is connected by broad gauge line. Roorkee comes under Northern Railway region of Indian Railways on the main Punjab – Mughal Sarai trunk route and is connected to major Indian cities. Other railheads are Rishikesh, Kotdwar and Ramnagar linked to Delhi by daily trains.

Jolly Grant Airport in Dehradun and Pantnagar Airport in Pantnagar are the major airports and the main gateway to the state. Jolly Grant Airport is the busiest airport in the state with six daily flights to Delhi Airport. Pantnagar Airport of the Kumaon region have 1 daily air service to Delhi and return too. The state has also proposed creating the Naini Saini Airport in Pithoragarh, Bharkot Airport in Chinyalisaur in Uttarkashi district and Gauchar Airport in Gauchar, Chamoli district.

== Tourism ==
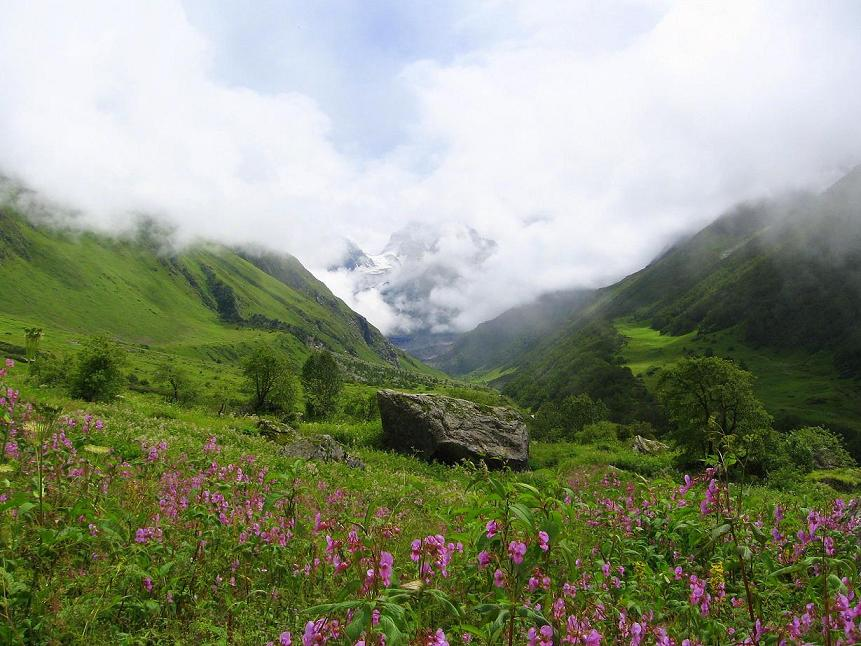
Valley of Flowers National Park

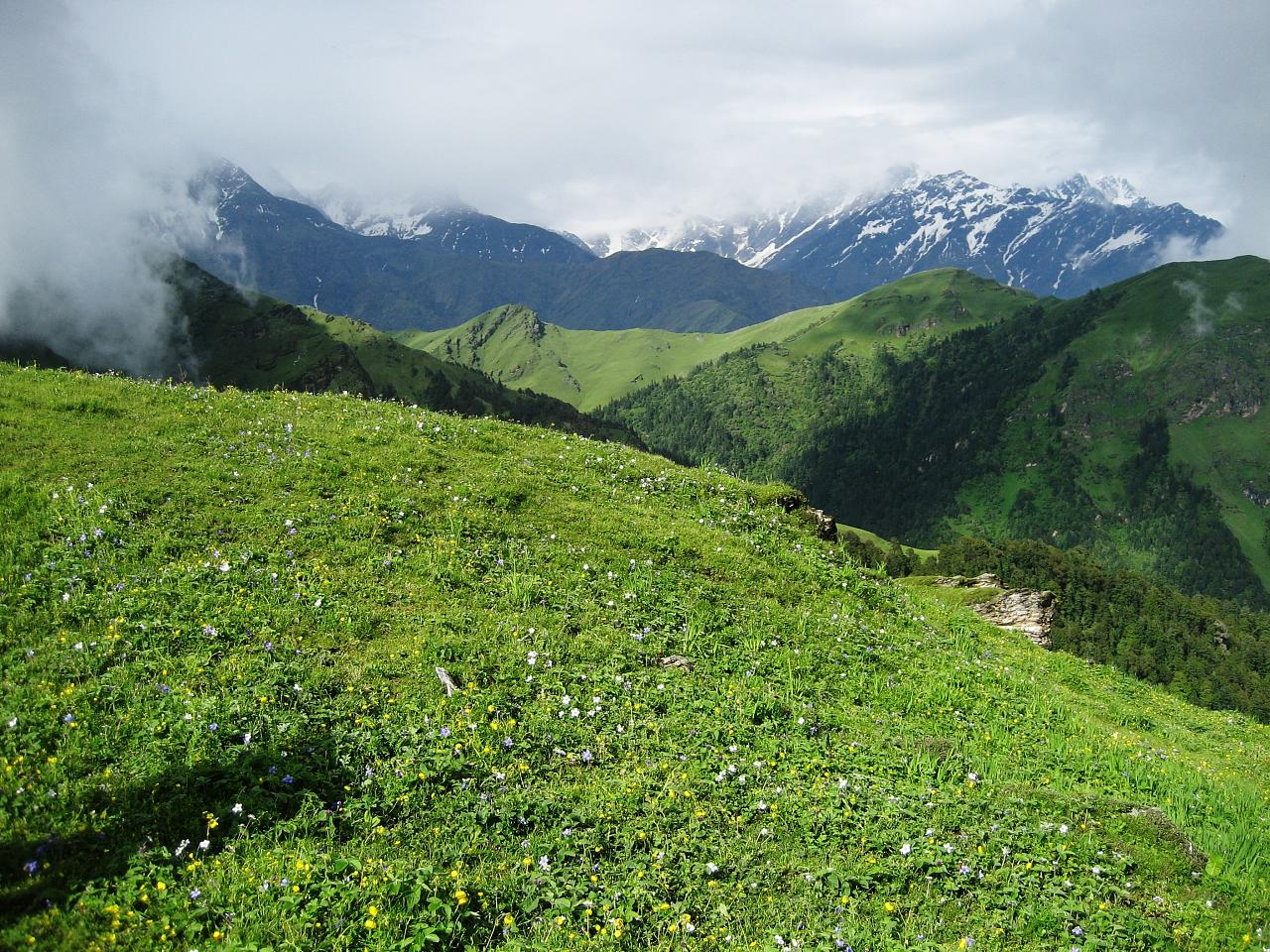
View of a Bugyal (meadow) in Uttarakhand

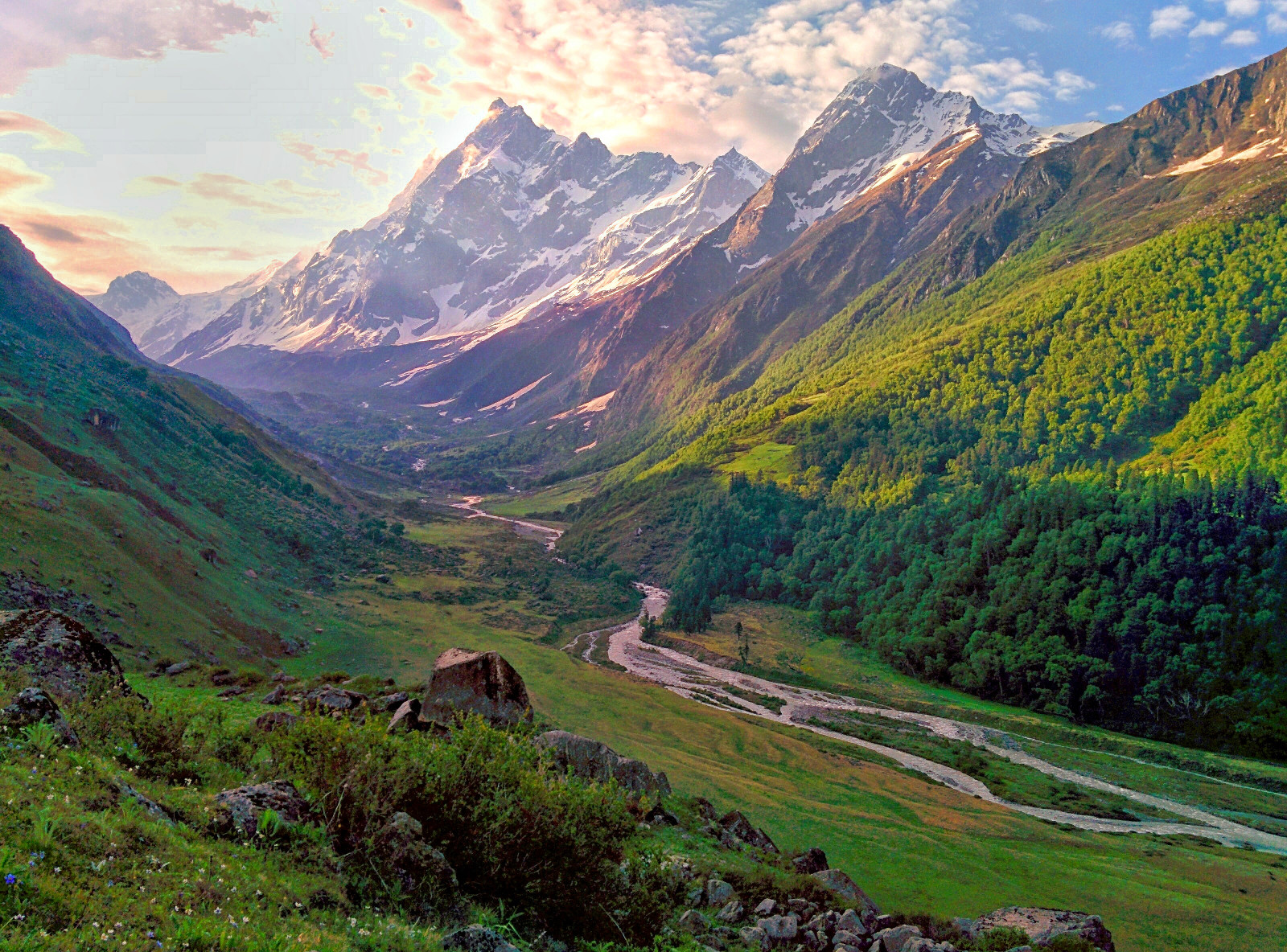
Har Ki Doon, a high-altitude hanging valley

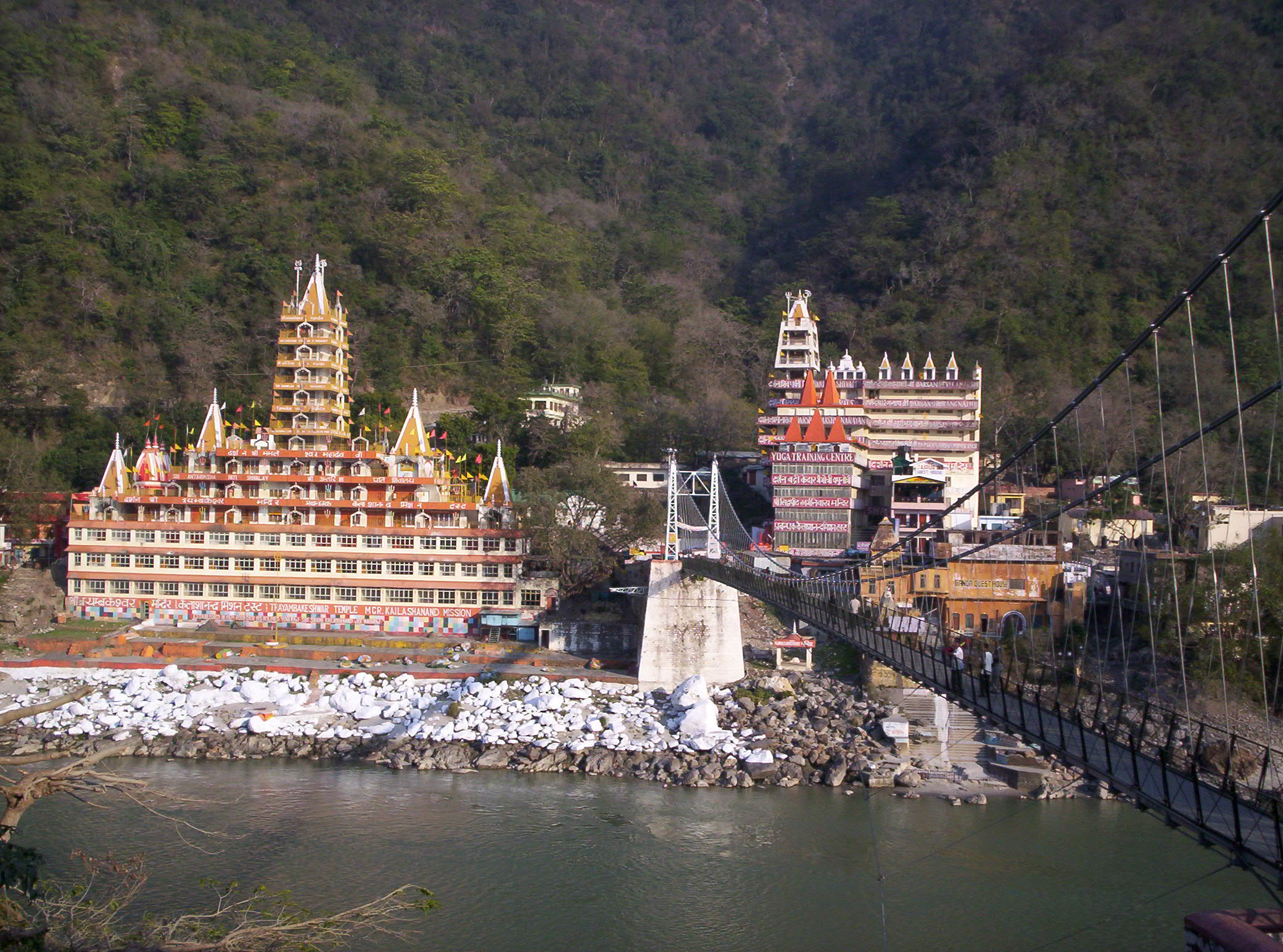
Rishikesh view and 13 stories Shiva temple across Lakshman Jhula bridge over the Ganges

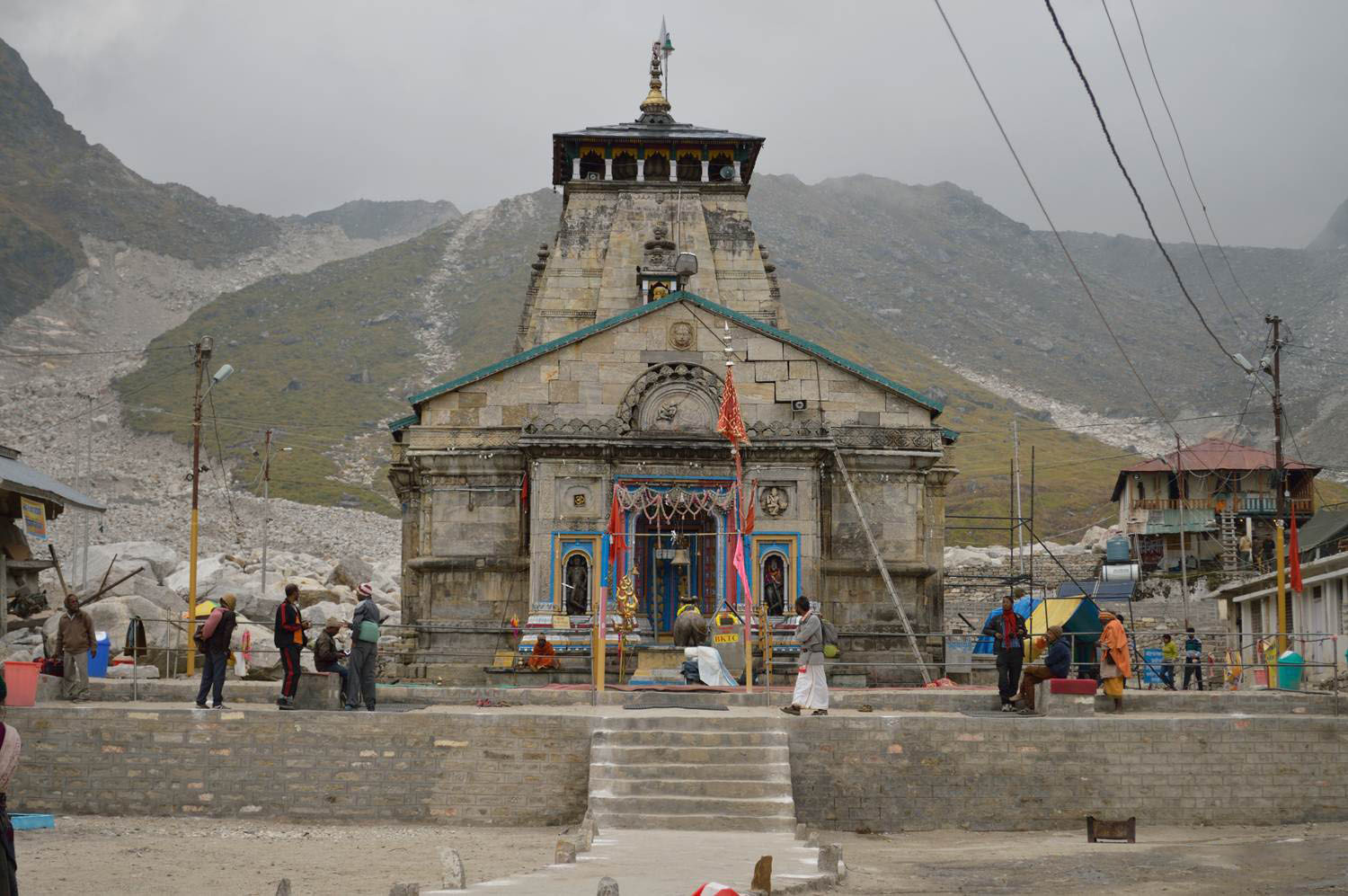
Kedarnath Temple is one of the 12 Jyotirlingas

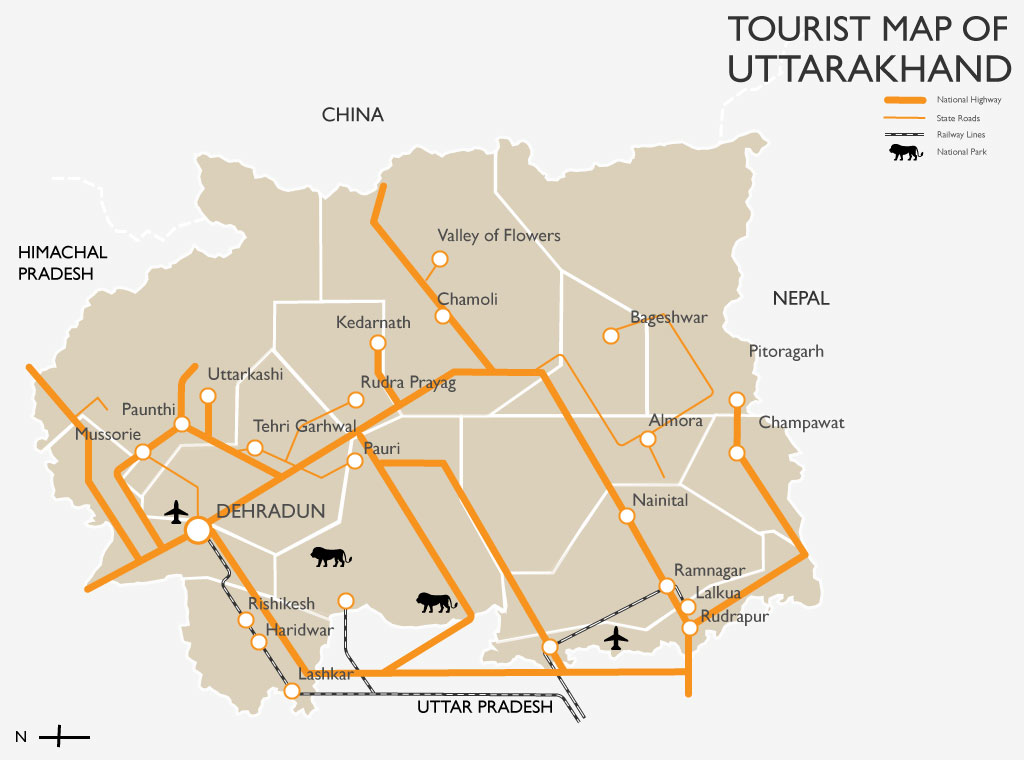
Schematic tourist map of Uttarakhand

Uttarakhand has many tourist spots due to its location in the Himalayas. There are many ancient temples, forest reserves, national parks, hill stations, and mountain peaks that draw large number of tourists. There are 44 nationally protected monuments in the state. Oak Grove School in the state is on the tentative list for World Heritage Sites. Two of the most holy rivers in Hinduism the Ganges and Yamuna, originate in Uttarakhand. Binsar Devta is a popular Hindu temple in the area.

Uttarakhand has long been called "Land of the Gods" as the state has some of the holiest Hindu shrines, and for more than a thousand years, pilgrims have been visiting the region in the hopes of salvation and purification from sin. Gangotri and Yamunotri, the sources of the Ganges and Yamuna, dedicated to Ganga and Yamuna respectively, fall in the upper reaches of the state and together with Badrinath (dedicated to Vishnu) and Kedarnath (dedicated to Shiva) form the Chota Char Dham, one of Hinduism's most spiritual and auspicious pilgrimage circuits. Haridwar, meaning "Gateway to the God", is a prime Hindu destination. Haridwar hosts the Haridwar Kumbh Mela every twelve years, in which millions of pilgrims take part from all parts of India and the world. Rishikesh near Haridwar is known as the preeminent yoga centre of India. The state has an abundance of temples and shrines, many dedicated to local deities or manifestations of Shiva and Durga, references to many of which can be found in Hindu scriptures and legends. Uttarakhand is, however, a place of pilgrimage for the adherents of other religions too. Piran Kaliyar Sharif near Roorkee is a pilgrimage site to Muslims, Gurudwara Darbar Sahib, in Dehradun, Gurudwara Hemkund Sahib in Chamoli district, Gurudwara Nanakmatta Sahib in Nanakmatta and Gurudwara Reetha Sahib in Champawat district are pilgrimage centres for Sikhs. Tibetan Buddhism has also made its presence with the reconstruction of Mindrolling Monastery and its Buddha Stupa, described as the world's highest at Clement Town, Dehradun.

Auli and Munsiari are well-known skiing resorts in the state.

The state has 12 national parks and wildlife sanctuaries, which cover 13.8% of the total area of the state. They are located at different altitudes varying from 800 to 5400 metres. The oldest national park on the Indian sub-continent, Jim Corbett National Park, is a major tourist attraction.

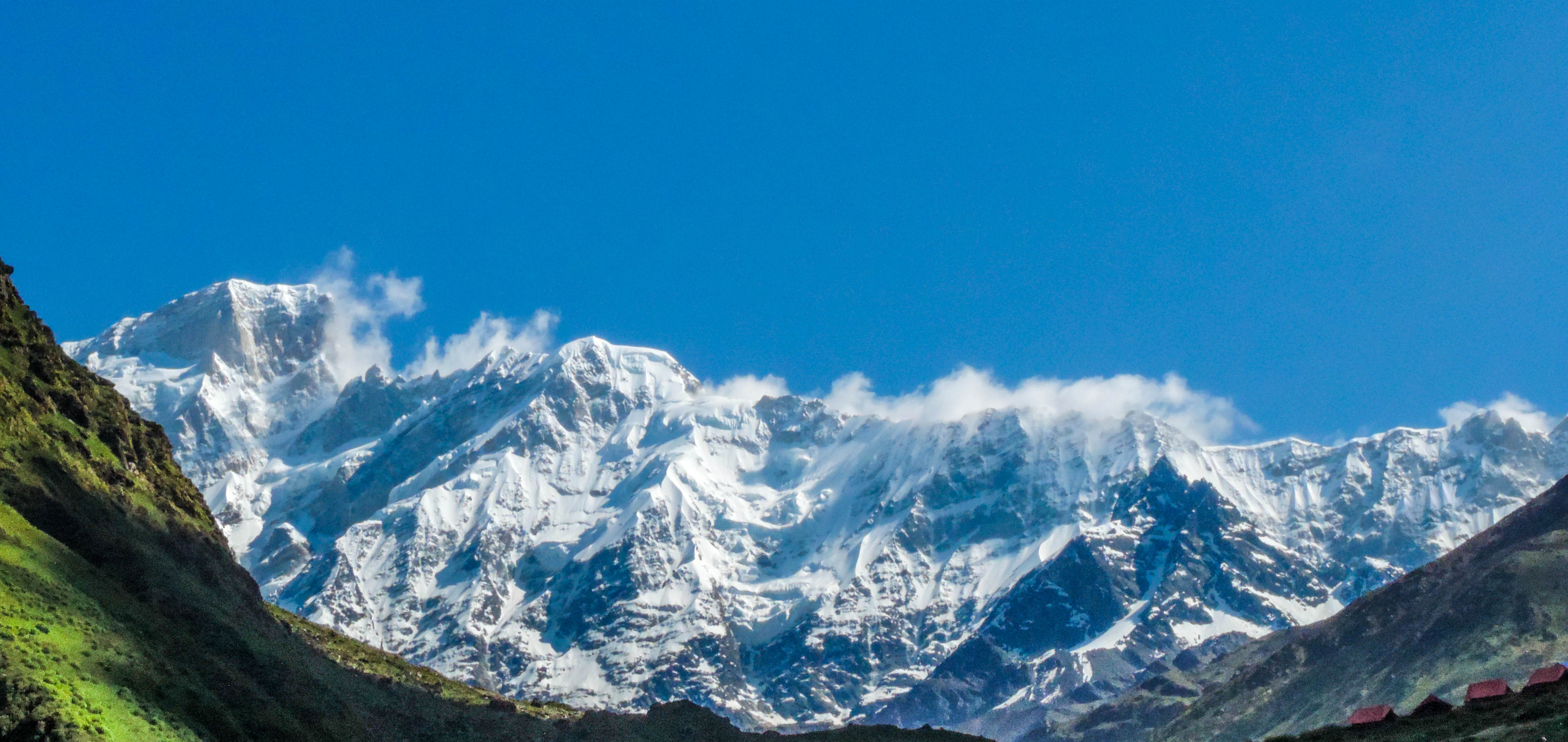
Garhwal Himalaya mountain range in Kedarnath, Uttarakhand

Vasudhara Falls, near Badrinath, is a waterfall with a height of 122 metres (400 ft) set in a backdrop of snow-clad mountains. The state has always been a destination for mountaineering, hiking, and rock climbing in India. A recent development in adventure tourism in the region has been whitewater rafting in Rishikesh. Due to its proximity to the Himalaya ranges, the place is full of hills and mountains and is suitable for trekking, climbing, skiing, camping, rock climbing, and paragliding. Roopkund is a trekking site, known for the mysterious skeletons found in a lake, which was featured by National Geographic Channel in a documentary. The trek to Roopkund passes through the meadows of Bugyal.

New Tehri city has Tehri Dam, with a height of 260.5 metres (855 ft) is the tallest dam in India. It is currently ranked No 10 on the List of Tallest Dams in the world. Tehri Lake with a surface area of 52 km^{2} (20 sq mi), is the biggest lake in the state of Uttarakhand. It has good options for Adventure Sports and various water sports like Boating, Banana Boat, Bandwagon Boat, Jet Ski, Water Skiing, Para-sailing, Kayaking.

== Education ==
The educational system prevailing in the state's schools specifies an initial 10-year course of study, which is divided into three stages: lower primary, upper primary, and secondary school—known as 4+3+3, which signifies the number of years for each stage. After the first 10 years of schooling, students typically enroll in Higher Secondary Schooling in one of the three major streams—liberal arts, commerce, or science. Upon completing the required coursework, students can enroll in general or professional undergraduate (UG) degree-college programmes. Schools in the state are either managed by the government or by private trusts. The majority of public schools are affiliated with the Uttarakhand Board of School Education (UBSE) use Hindi as a medium of instruction. Private schools in Uttarakhand—which use English as the language of instruction—are affiliated to one of three administering bodies, CBSE, CISCE, or ICSE.

Uttarakhand has more than 20 universities, including one central university, twelve state universities, three deemed universities, one IIT in Roorkee, one IIM in Kashipur and an AIIMS in Rishikesh. Inaugurated by Jawahar Lal Nehru in 1960, G.B. Pant University of Agriculture and Technology, provides research and training in agriculture and engineering. Located in Bharsar and Ranichauri, Veer Chandra Singh Garhwali Uttarakhand University of Horticulture and Forestry, is a state agricultural university and has two campuses, one is in Bharsar town of Pauri Garhwal district and other is in Ranichauri town of Tehri Garhwal district. Kumaun University; located in Nainital, is one of the oldest universities in the region.

Uttarakhand is home to some of premier institutes of India that hold the status of national importance due to their significant contributions to education, research, and national development. Founded in 1906, Forest Research Institute (FRI) is the oldest institutions of its kind. Its campus hosts the Indira Gandhi National Forest Academy (IGNFA), the staff college that trains officers selected for the Indian Forest Service (IFS). Located in Dehradun, The Doon School has been consistently ranked as the best all-boys residential school in India. Established in 1959, Lal Bahadur Shastri National Academy of Administration (LBSNA), Mussoorie, trains civil servants for the Indian Administrative Service (IAS). The Indian Military Academy (IMA), is officer training academy for the Indian Army. The academy trains officer cadets for the Permanent Commission into the Army.

== Sports ==
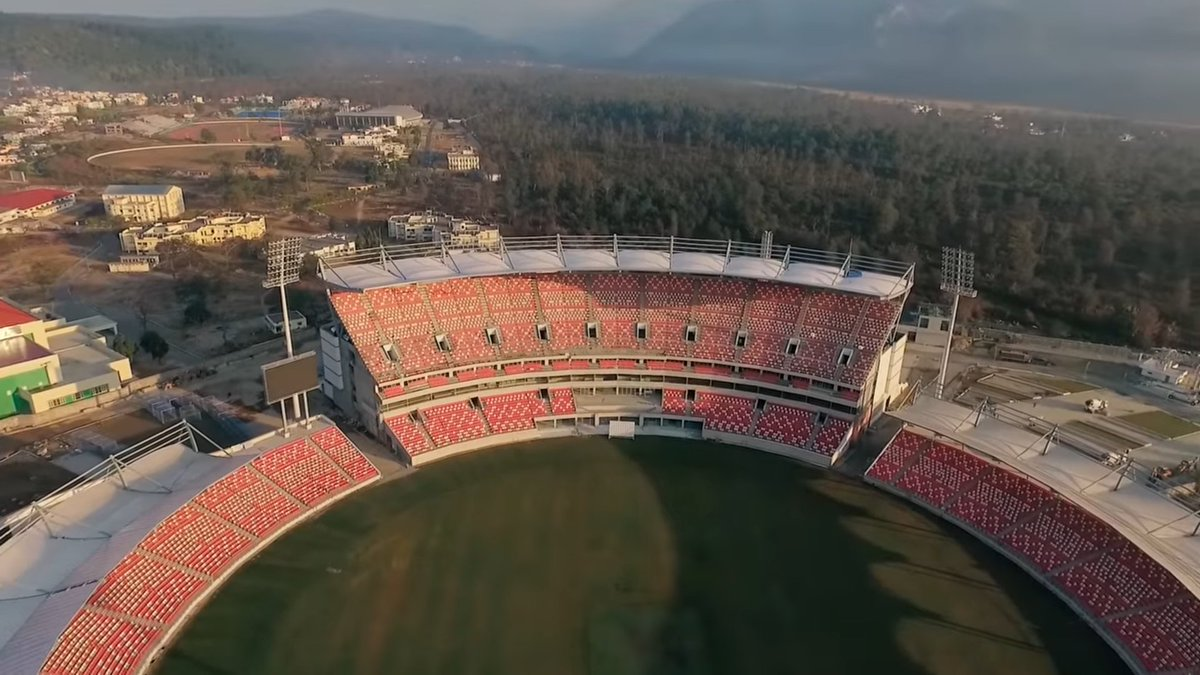
Rajiv Gandhi International Cricket Stadium in Dehradun

Due to its mountainous terrain and rivers, Uttarakhand attract tourists and adventure seekers for adventure sports, such as paragliding, sky diving, rafting and bungee jumping. Uttarakhand is home to some of the highest peaks in India, including Nanda Devi and Tirsuli, popular for mountaineering expeditions and climbing activities. Traditional sports Mallakhamb (pole gymnastics), Gatka (a form of martial arts) and Gulli Danda (similar to cricket) are preserved, are preserved but have limited exposure. More recently, golf has also become popular with Ranikhet being a favourite destination.

The Cricket Association of Uttarakhand is the governing body for cricket activities. The Uttarakhand cricket team represents Uttarakhand in Ranji Trophy, Vijay Hazare Trophy and Syed Mushtaq Ali Trophy. Rajiv Gandhi International Cricket Stadium in Dehradun is the home ground of Uttarakhand cricket team. Uttarakhand has state-level associations for various sports that organise tournaments and promote talent development.

The Uttarakhand State Football Association is the governing body for association football. The Uttarakhand football team represents Uttarakhand in the Santosh Trophy and other leagues. The Indira Gandhi International Sports Stadium in Haldwani is the home ground of Uttarakhand football team.

== See also ==
- Outline of Uttarakhand
- Himalayan states
- Indian Himalayan Region
- Mountain Temples and Temple Mountains
