= Salani dialect =

Garhwali dialect of Uttarakhand, India

Salani
- सलाणी
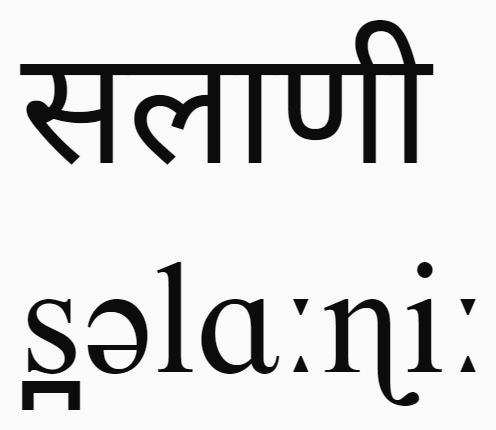
- Native to: India
- Region: Uttarakhand
- Language family: Indo-European: Indo-Iranian; Indo-Aryan; Northern; Central Pahari; Garhwali; Salani

Language codes
- ISO 639-3: –
- Glottolog: sala1263
- Salani-speaking area Salani dialect (India)
- Coordinates: 29.9170°N 78.7101°E

Salani is a Garhwali dialect spoken in the Pauri Garhwal District of Uttarakhand, northern India. It is the most spoken dialect of Garhwali G.A. Grierson has described it as "practically the same as Srinagaria dialect". It is Mostly spoken in Talla, Malla, and Ganga Salan .The dialect is also spoken in the Parganas immediately to the north of the three Salans, and in the western portion of Pargana Pali of Almora.

== Region and stats ==
it is spoken to the South of Rathwali, in the Parganas of Malla, Tallā and Gañgā Salan, in the parganas to the immediate North and in Western portion of Pali pargana of Almora.

Below are the statistics of estimated number of speakers in different regions, as of early 20th century:

Stats of Salani (last updated 1916)
Region	No. of speakers
Pauri(British Garhwal)	207,832
Almora	15,176
Dehradun	5000
Saharanpur	250
Bijnor	1000
Moradabad	500

== Script & specimen ==
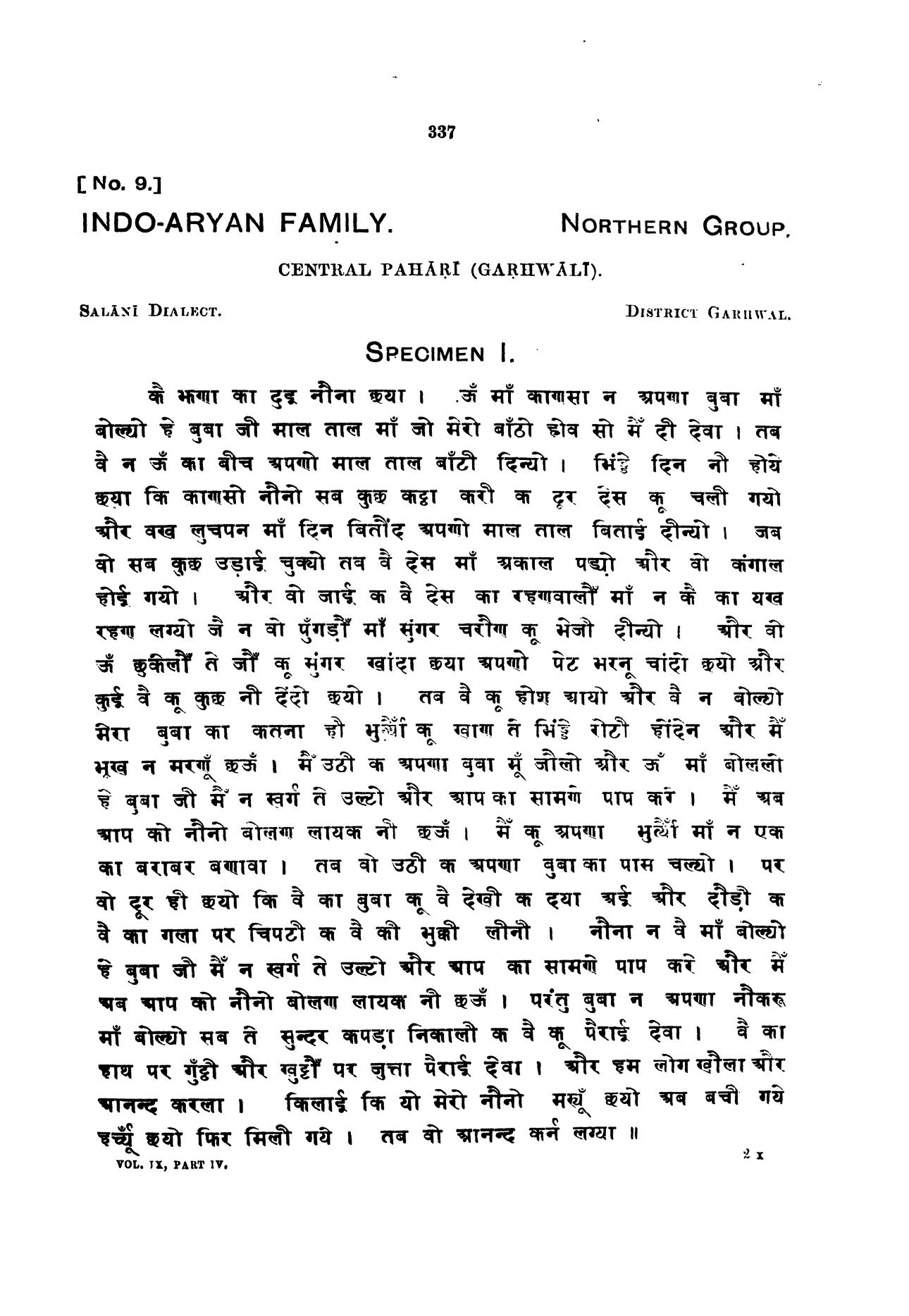
A sample in Salani, taken from Grierson's book.

== See also ==
- Srinagaria
- Rathwali
- Nagpuri
- Tehriyali
