= Bangani =

Western Pahari language of India

- बंगाणी
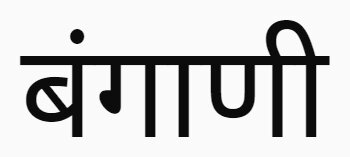
- Pronunciation: [bəŋɡaːɳiː] (Bangani)
- Native to: Uttarakhand; Himachal Pradesh
- Region: Mahasu
- Language family: Indo-European: Indo-Iranian; Indo-Aryan; Northern; Central Pahari; Garhwali; Bangani

Language codes
- ISO 639-3: –
- Glottolog: bang1335
- ELP: Bangani
- Approximate location of the Bangani-speaking area in India
- Coordinates: 31.2°N 78.4°E

A native speaker discussing the state of access to public information in and online use of Bangani language in 2019

Balbeer Singh Rawat, a Bangani speaker discussing the Bangani language

Uttarkashi District

Bangani ([bəŋɡaːɳiː], बंगाणी baṅgāṇī) is dialect of Garhwali spoken in parts of Uttarkashi district in the west of the Garhwal division of Uttarakhand, India. It has been described as a member of the Western Pahari language group. It shares at least half and possibly as much as two-thirds of its basic vocabulary with both neighbouring varieties of the Garhwali language and with two Western Pahari languages, Jaunsari and Sirmauri.

== Phonology ==
=== Consonants ===
		Labial	Dental	Alveolar	Retroflex	Post-alv./ Palatal	Velar	Glottal
Plosive / Affricate	voiceless	p	t		ʈ	tɕ	k	
Plosive / Affricate	aspriated	pʰ	tʰ		ʈʰ	tɕʰ	kʰ	
Plosive / Affricate	voiced	b	d		ɖ	dʑ	ɡ	
Plosive / Affricate	breathy	bʱ	dʱ		ɖʱ	dʑʱ	ɡʱ	
Fricative				s		ɕ		ɦ
Nasal		m		n	ɳ			
Lateral				l	ɭ			
Trill / Tap	voiced			r	ɽ			
Trill / Tap	breathy			rʱ	ɽʱ			
Approximant						j	w	

=== Vowels ===
	Front	Central	Back
Close	i iː		u uː
Close-mid	eː		oː
Mid		ə əː	
Open-mid	(ɛ) ɛː		(ɔ) ɔː
Open		aː	

== Lexical similarity with neighbors ==
Lexical similarity
	% lexical similarity
Jaunpuri	56%
Jaunsari	61%
Sirmauri	59%
Nagpuri	56%

== Centum substrate hypothesis ==
Bangani is of interest amongst scholars of Indo-European languages, due to some unusual features.

Since the 1980s, Claus Peter Zoller – a scholar of Indian linguistics and literature – has hypothesised, controversially, that Bangani has a substrate from a centum-group Indo-European language. Zoller also suggests that Bangani has been misclassified as a dialect of Garhwali and is more closely related to the Western Pahari languages.

While Zoller's centum substrate hypothesis remains controversial, it and his underlying data have been supported by 21st century linguists and indologists, such as Anvita Abbi, Hans Henrich Hock, and Koenraad Elst. Abbi visited Bangan and confirmed the accuracy of Zoller's data.

The substance of Zoller's claims has been rejected by George van Driem and Suhnu Sharma, in publications since 1996, which claim that Zoller's data was flawed and that Bangani is an unambiguously satem language.

Zoller does not accept the findings by van Driem and Sharma, and claims that there are methodological issues and factual errors in van Driem and Sharma's work. In addition, Zoller also notes the two scholars did not set foot in Bangan but interviewed speakers at another location near Bangan.
