= Persian phonology =

Sounds and pronunciation of the Persian language

The phonology of the Persian language varies between regional dialects and standard varieties. Persian is a pluricentric language and countries that have Persian as an official language have separate standard varieties, namely: Standard Dari (Afghanistan), Standard Iranian Persian (Iran) and Standard Tajik (Tajikistan). The most significant differences between standard varieties of Persian are their vowel systems. Standard varieties of Persian have anywhere from 6 to 8 vowel distinctions, and similar vowels may be pronounced differently between standards. However, there are not many notable differences when comparing consonants, as all standard varieties have a similar number of consonant sounds. Though, colloquial varieties generally have more differences than their standard counterparts. Most dialects feature a contrastive pitch-accent and syllable-final consonant clusters. Linguists tend to focus on Iranian Persian, so this article may contain less adequate information regarding other varieties.

== Vowels ==
The vowel phonemes of Tehrani Persian.

Tehrani Persian vowel chart
	Front	Back
Close	iː	uː
Mid	e	o
Open	æ	ɒː

Dari vowel chart
	Front		Back	
	long	short	short	long
Close	iː	ɪ ~ (ɛ)	ʊ ~ (ɔ)	uː
Mid	eː	ɪ ~ (ɛ)	ʊ ~ (ɔ)	oː
Open		a ~ æ		ɑː

Tajik vowel chart
	Front	Central	Back
Close	i	ʉ ~ ɵ̞	u
Mid	e	ʉ ~ ɵ̞	ɔː
Open	a ~ æ		ɔː

In Iranian Persian there are three short vowels: /æ/, /e/ and /o/, and three long vowels: /ɒː/, /iː/ and /uː/. The three short vowels are only short when in an open syllable (i.e., without a coda) that is non-final (regardless of stress); e.g., صِدا [seˈdɒː] "sound", خُدا [xoˈdɒː] "God". In an unstressed closed syllable, they are around 60 percent as long as a long vowel. Otherwise all vowels are long; e.g., سِفْت‌تَر [seˑfˈtʰtæːɾ] "firmer". When the short vowels are in open syllables, they are also sometimes unstable and may tend to assimilate in quality to the following long vowel (both in informal and formal speech). Thus, دِوِیسْت /deˈviːst/ "two hundred" ranges between [de̝ˈviːstʰ] and [diˈviːstʰ]; شُلُوْغ /ʃoˈluːɢ/ "crowded" ranges between [ʃo̝ˈluːɢ] and [ʃuˈluːɢ]; رَسِیدن /ræsiːˈdæːn/ "to arrive" ranges between [ræ̝siːˈdæːn] and [resiːˈdæːn]; and so on.

In Dari the short vowels are /a/, /ɪ/ and /ʊ/ in Kabul, however /ɪ/ is pronounced as /ɛ/ in other regions such as Herat (and other places of western Afghanistan closer to eastern Iran) In Dari and Tajik /a/ is the most common vowel and at the end (and perhaps even in the middle as well) of a word may be pronounced as [æ]. (Note: Eastern Persian refers to the Dari and Tajik languages or dialects, especially when contrasted with "Western Persian", i.e "Iranian Persian") Unlike Iranian Persian, Dari has 5 long vowels /ɑː/, /eː/, /iː/, /oː/, and /uː/. The Dari vowel /ɑː/ and the Iranian vowel /ɒː/ are, respectively, the unrounded and rounded versions of the same vowel. In Iranian Persian, the phoneme /ɒː/ is typically realized with minimal lip rounding, and is frequently phonetically realized as [ɑː]. ('roundedness' refers to the shape of the lips during pronunciation)

In Iranian Persian word-final /o(ː)/ is rare except for تُو [tʰo(ː)] "you" and nouns of foreign origin. Word-final /æ/ is very rare in Iranian Persian, with the exception being نَه [næ] "no". The word-final /æ/ in Early New Persian mostly shifted to /e/ in contemporary Iranian Persian, and [e] is also an allophone of /æ/ in word-final position. /e/ is the most common short vowel that is pronounced in final open syllables.

=== Diphthongs ===
Falling
Palatal	Labial
ـُوی /uːi̯/	-
ـوی /oːi̯/	-
ـای /aːi̯/	ـاو /aːu̯/
ـَی /ai̯/	ـَو /au̯/

The status of diphthongs in Persian is disputed. Some authors list /ei̯, ou̯, ɒi̯, oi̯, ui̯/, others list only /ei̯/ and /ou̯/, but some do not recognize diphthongs in Persian at all. A major factor that complicates the matter is the change of two classical and pre-classical Persian diphthongs: /ai̯/ > /ei̯/ and /au̯/ > /ou̯/. This shift occurred in Iran but not in some modern varieties (particularly in Afghanistan). Morphological analysis also supports the view that the alleged Persian diphthongs are combinations of the vowels with /j/ and /w/, respectively written as ی and و.

=== Spelling and example words ===
IPA	Letter	Romanization	Example(s)
/a/	ـَ ,ـَه	a	/na/ на نَه "no"
/aː/	ـا, آ ,ـٰى	ā	/taː/ то تا "until"
/i/	ـِ ,ـِه	i	/ki/ ки کِه "that"
/iː/	ـِیـ ,ـِی	ī	/ʃiːr/ шир شِیر "milk"
/eː/	ـیـ ,ـی	ē	/ʃeːr/ шер شیر "lion"
/ai̯/	ـَیـ ،ـَی	ay	/naj/ най نَى "cane, flute"
/u/	ـُ ,ـُه ,ـُو	u	/tu/ ту تُو "you" (singular)
/uː/	ـُو	ū	/zuːd/ зуд زُود "early"
/oː/	ـو	ō	/zoːɾ/ зӯр زور "strength"
/au̯/	ـَو	aw	/naw/ نَو "new"

In the modern Perso-Arabic alphabet, the short vowels /a/, /i/ and /u/ are usually left unwritten, as is normally done in the Arabic alphabet. (See Arabic phonology § Vowels.)

=== Historical shifts ===
Early New Persian inherited from Middle Persian eight vowels: three short i, a, u and five long ī, ē, ā, ō, ū (in IPA: /i a u/ and /iː eː aː oː uː/). This system likely passed into the common Persian era from a purely quantitative system into one where the short vowels differed from their long counterparts also in quality: i > [ɪ]; u > [ʊ]; ā > [ɑː]. These quality contrasts have, in modern Persian varieties, become the main distinction between the two sets of vowels.

The inherited eight-vowel inventory is retained without major upheaval in Dari, which also preserves quantitative distinctions.

In Iranian Persian, two of the vowel contrasts have been lost: those between the tense mid and close vowels. Thus ē, ī have merged as [iː], while ō, ū have merged as [uː]. In addition, the lax close vowels have been lowered: i > [e], u > [o]; this vowel change has also happened in many (though not all, and still not in the standardised) dialects of Dari. The lax open vowel has become fronted: a > [æ], and in word-final (and sometimes, even in both word-initial as well as word-medial) positions further raised to [e]. Modern Iranian Persian does not feature distinctive vowel length.

In both varieties, ā is more or less labialized and raised in Dari. Dari ō is also somewhat fronted.

Tajiki has also lost two of the vowel contrasts, but differently from Western Persian. Here, the tense/lax contrast among the close vowels has been eliminated. That is, i and ī have merged as /ɪ/, and u and ū as /ʊ/. The back vowels have chain shifted as well. Open ā has been rounded and raised to an open-mid vowel /ɔ/ (compare with Canaanite shift). In northern dialects, mid ō (transcribed phonologically as ⟨ӯ⟩ in the Cyrillic script and "ū" in the Latin script) has shifted to /ɵ/, while in southern dialects, mid ō has shifted upward and merged with ū (and u) as /ʊ/.

A feature of Eastern Persian dialects is the systematic lowering of i and ī (both ⟨и⟩ in Tajiki) to e and ē (both ⟨е⟩ in Tajiki), and u and ū (both ⟨у⟩ in Tajiki) to o and ō (both ⟨ӯ⟩ in Tajiki), directly before a glottal consonant (/h/ or /ʔ/) that is in the same syllable; loanwords from Arabic generally undergo these changes as well. However, since ⟨ӯ⟩ (o, ō) has merged into ⟨у⟩ (u, ū) in most dialects of southern and central Tajikistan, ⟨у⟩ (/ʊ/) is realized before the glottal consonants in those dialects instead. (This phenomenon also occurs in neighbouring Hindustani (Hindi-Urdu) Punjabi, Saraiki and Sindhi, but it is only the short vowels i and u that are lowered to e and o before /h/ and /ʔ/; and that too only observed in the Turko-Perso-Arabic lexicon, not at all in Sanskrit- and Prakrit-derived lexicon.)

The following chart summarizes the later shifts into modern Dari, Tajik, and Iranian Persian.

Early New Persian (ENP) and Classical Persian	New Persian				Examples			
Early New Persian (ENP) and Classical Persian	Western (i.e., Iranian) Persian	Eastern Persian		Indo-Persian	Examples			
Early New Persian (ENP) and Classical Persian	Western (i.e., Iranian) Persian	Dari	Tajik	Indo-Persian	Perso-Arabic script	Tajik Cyrillic script	Romanization	English translation
/a/ (Note: i.e., /a/ being in all the other positions other than the final positions)	/æ/~/e/	/a/~/æ/		/ə/~/ɐ/~/a/	شَب	шаб	šab	night
/a/ (Note: i.e., /a/ only being in the final positions)	/e/	/a/~/æ/		/ɑː/	ویژَه	вижа	wēža	special
/aː/	/ɒː/	/ɑː/	/ɔ/	/ɑː/	بَاد	бод	bād	wind
/i/	/e/	/ɪ/	/i/	/ɪ/	دِل	дил	dil	heart
/iː/	/iː/	/iː/	/i/	/iː/	شِیر	шир	šīr	milk
/eː/	/iː/	/eː/	/e/	/eː/	شیر	шер	šēr	lion
/u/	/o/	/ʊ/	/u/	/ʊ/	گُل	гул	gul	flower
/uː/	/uː/	/uː/	/u/	/uː/	نُور	нур	nūr	light
/oː/	/uː/	/oː/	/ɵ/	/oː/	روز	рӯз	rōz	day
/ai̯/	/ei̯/	/ai̯/~/æi̯/		/ɛː/ (Note: Monophthongization is usually seen in the northern and northwestern Indian subcontinent, due to the absence of the diphthongs in northern (only the Western Pahari languages; meanwhile Central Pahari languages such as Garhwali and Kumaoni are a mixed bag.), northwestern, and central Indo-Aryan languages (basically Western Hindi languages); except Hindustani (Hindi-Urdu) dialects (Note: Examples include (but are not limited to) Andaman Creole Hindi, Aurangabadi Urdu, Bangalori Urdu, Dakhini, Dhakaiya Urdu, Haflong Hindi, Hyderabadi Urdu, Judeo-Urdu, Kalkatiya Urdu, Bihari Hindi, Bombay Hindi, etc.) (outside northern, northwestern and central India, where the diaphthongs are maintained).)~/əi̯/ (Note: Diphthongs getting retained is usually seen in eastern, northeastern, western and sorthern Indian subcontinent, due to the presence of the diphthongs in northern (only the Eastern Pahari languages such as Nepali; meanwhile Central Pahari languages such as Garhwali and Kumaoni are a mixed bag.), eastern (basically the Eastern Hindi and Bihari languages), western and southern Indo-Aryan languages, along with certain Hindustani (Hindi-Urdu) dialects (in the eastern, northeastern, western and southern India); plus the Dravidian languages as well.)	کَى	кай	kay	when
/au̯/	/ou̯/~/oː/	/au̯/~/æu̯/		/ɔː/~/əu̯/	نَو	нав	naw	new
/aːi̯/	/ɒːi̯/	/ɑi̯/	/ɔi̯/	/ɑː.eː/~/ɑː.iː/	پَای	пой	pāy	foot
/aːu̯/	/ɒːv/	/ɑːu̯/	/ɔu̯/	/ɑː.oː/~/ɑː.uː/	گَاو	гов	gāw	cow
/eːu̯/	/iːv/	/eːu̯/	/eu̯/	/eː.oː/~/eː.uː/	دیو	дев	dēw	demon, devil, goblin, daeva, div
/eːu̯/	/iːv/	/eːu̯/	/eu̯/	/eː.oː/~/eː.uː/	ریو	рев	rēw	fraud, deceit
/oːi̯/	/uːi̯/	/oːi̯/	/ɵi̯/	/oː.eː/~/oː.iː/	بوی	бӯй	bōy	smell, scent
/oːi̯/	/uːi̯/	/oːi̯/	/ɵi̯/	/oː.eː/~/oː.iː/	خوی	хӯй	xōy	custom, humour, nature

== Consonants ==
		Labial	Dento- alveolar	Post-alv./ Palatal	Velar	Uvular	Glottal
Nasal		m	n				
Plosive/ Affricate	voiceless	p	t	t͡ʃ	k	(q)^{1}	ʔ
Plosive/ Affricate	voiced	b	d	d͡ʒ	ɡ		
Fricative	voiceless	f	s	ʃ	x~χ		h
Fricative	voiced	ʋ^{2}	z	ʒ	ɣ~ʁ		
Approximant		ʋ^{2}	l	j			
Tap/Trill			ɾ~r				

Notes:

1. In central and northwestern Iranian Persian (especially in and around Tehran; see Tehrani accent for more) /ɣ/ and /q/ have merged into [ɣ~ʁ~ɢ]; as a voiced velar [ɣ] or a uvular fricative [ʁ] when positioned intervocalically and unstressed, and as a voiced uvular stop [ɢ] otherwise. Many other dialects within Iran have well preserved the distinction.
2. While a single diaphoneme, it may be interpreted as phonemic /w/ in Dari (also in Early New Persian and Classical Persian as well), and phonemic /v/ in Iranian Persian. In Dari (as well as in Early New Persian and Classical Persian), this phoneme is fairly stable; it is exclusively realized as [w] without any notable allophonic variations. In Iranian Persian, this phoneme is a stable [ʋ] in the onset, but less stable in the coda, where [w] may occur after certain vowels. In Tajik (largely as a result of the adoption of the Cyrillic alphabet), it varies freely between [w~v] most of the time, but [v] is more common in the syllable onset.

=== Allophonic variation ===
Alveolar stops /t/ and /d/ are either apical alveolar or laminal denti-alveolar. The voiceless obstruents /p, t, t͡ʃ, k/ are aspirated much (though certainly not in the Early New Persian, as well as in the early Classical Persian; as evidenced by Indo-Persian) like their English counterparts: they become aspirated when they begin a syllable, though aspiration is not contrastive. The Persian language does not have syllable-initial consonant clusters (see below), so unlike in English, /p, t, k/ are aspirated even following /s/, as in هَسْتَم /ˈhastam/ ('I exist'). They are also aspirated at the end of syllables, although not as strongly (with the possible exception of the western/Iranian Persian).

The velar stops /k, ɡ/ are palatalized before front vowels and at the end of a syllable.

In both Early New Persian (ENP) and Classical Persian, the uvular consonants غ and ق denoted the original Arabic phonemes, the voiced velar fricative [ɣ] and the voiceless uvular plosive [q], respectively. In modern Tehrani Persian (which is used in the Iranian mass media, both colloquial and standard), there is little to no difference in the pronunciation of غ and ق. The usual realisation is that of a voiced uvular plosive [ɢ], but a voiced fricative (both velar and uvular; [ɣ]~[ʁ] respectively) is common intervocalically. The classical pronunciations of غ and ق are well preserved in the eastern varieties, Dari and Tajiki, as well as in the southern varieties (e.g. Zoroastrian Dari language and other Central / Central Plateau or Kermanic languages).

Some Iranian speakers show a similar merger of ج and ژ, such that [d͡ʒ] alternates with [ʒ], with the latter being restricted to intervocalic position.

Some speakers front /h/ to a voiceless palatal fricative [ç] in the vicinity of /i/, especially in syllable-final position. The velar/uvular fricatives are never fronted in such a way.

The flap /ɾ/ has a trilled allophone [r] at the beginning of a word; otherwise, they contrast between vowels, wherein a trill occurs as a result of gemination (doubling) of [ɾ], especially in loanwords of Arabic origin. Only [ɾ] occurs before and after consonants; in word-final position, it is usually a free variation between a flap and a trill when followed by a consonant or a pause, but flap is more common; only flap before vowel-initial words. An approximant [ɹ] also occurs as an allophone of /ɾ/ before /t, d, s, z, ʃ, ʒ, l/; [ɹ] is sometimes (especially in western Iranian Persian, and may not even be in Dari) in free variation with [ɾ] in these and other positions, such that پَارْسِی ('Persian') is pronounced [pɒːɹˈsiː] or [pɒːɾˈsiː] and سَقِرْلَات ('scarlet') [sæɣeɹˈlɒːt] or [sæɣeɾˈlɒːt]. /r/ is sometimes realized as a long approximant [ɹː].

As in many other languages, /n/ is realized as bilabial [m] before bilabial stops (i.e., /p, b/), as velar [ŋ] before velar stops (i.e., /k, ɡ/), and uvlar [ɴ] before uvular stops (i.e., /q/).

/f, s, ʃ, x/ may be voiced to, respectively, [v, z, ʒ, ɣ] before voiced consonants; /n/ may be bilabial [m] before bilabial consonants. Also /b/ may in some cases change into [β], or even [v]; for example بَاز ('open') may be pronounced [bɒːz] as well as [βɒːz] or [vɒːz] and/or [vɒː], colloquially.

=== Dialectal variation ===
The pronunciation of و [w] in Classical Persian shifted to [v] in Iranian Persian and Tajik (though not fully), but is retained in Dari, where it is (almost) always voiced as [w], as in Middle Persian. In modern Persian [w] may be (but not always, especially in many Afghan Persian dialects) lost if preceded by a consonant and followed by a vowel in one whole syllable, e.g. خْوَاب /xʷɑːb/ ~ [xɑːb] 'sleep', as Persian has no syllable-initial consonant clusters (see below, as well as the silent vāv).

=== Spellings and example words ===
Phoneme	Perso-Arabic alphabet	Tajik alphabet	Example			
/p/	پ	п	/piˈdar/	پِدَر	пидар	'father'
/b/	ب	б	/baɾaːˈdar/	بَرَادَر	бародар	'brother'
/t/	ت, ط	т	/taː/	تَا	то	'until'
/d/	د	д	/doːst/	دوسْت	дӯст	'friend'
/k/	ک	к	/kiʃˈwar/	کِشْوَر	кишвар	'country'
/ɡ/	گ	г	/ɡuˈɾoːh/	گُروه	гурӯҳ	'group'
/ʔ/	ع, ء	ъ	/maʔˈnaː/	مَعْنَا	маъно	'meaning'
/t͡ʃ/	چ	ч	/t͡ʃoːb/	چوب	чӯб	'wood'
/d͡ʒ/	ج	ҷ	/d͡ʒaˈwaːn/	جَوَان	ҷавон	'young'
/f/	ف	ф	/fiˈʃaːr/	فِشَار	фишор	'pressure'
/ʋ/	و	в	/ʋeːˈʒa/	ویژَه	вижа	'special'
/s/	ث, س, ص	с	/saːˈja/	سَایَه	соя	'shadow'
/z/	ذ, ز, ض, ظ	з	/aːˈzaːd/	آزَاد	озод	'free'
/ʃ/	ش	ш	/ʃaːh/	شَاه	шоҳ	'king'
/ʒ/	ژ	ж	/ʒaːˈla/	ژَالَه	жола	'dew'
/x/	خ	х	/xaːˈna/	خَانَه	хона	'house'
/ɣ/	غ	ғ	/ɣarb/	غَرْب	ғарб	'west'
/q/	ق	қ	/qaˈlam/	قَلَم	қалам	'pen'
/h/	ح, ه	ҳ	/haft/	هَفْت	ҳафт	'seven'
/m/	م	м	/maːˈdar/	مَادَر	модар	'mother'
/n/	ن	н	/naːn/	نَان	нон	'bread'
/l/	ل	л	/lab/	لَب	лаб	'lip'
/ɾ/	ر	р	/ʔeːˈɾaːn/	ایرَان	Эрон	'Iran'
/j/	ی	й	/jaː/	یَا	ё	'or'

Before every initial vowel onset, a glottal stop /ʔ/ is pronounced (e.g., ایرَان Эрон [ʔeːˈɾaːn] 'Iran').

In standard Iranian Persian based on the Tehrani accent, the consonants /ɣ/ and /q/ are often (though not always) pronounced identically.

Consonants, including /ʔ/ and /h/, can be geminated, often in words from Arabic. This is represented in the IPA by doubling the consonant (e.g., سَیِّد саййид [sajˈjiːd] 'Sayyid').

== Phonotactics ==
=== Syllable structure ===
Syllables may be structured as (C)(S)V(S)(C(C)).

Persian syllable structure consists of an optional syllable onset, consisting of one consonant; an obligatory syllable nucleus, consisting of a vowel optionally preceded by and/or followed by a semivowel; and an optional syllable coda, consisting of one or two consonants. The following restrictions apply:

- Onset
  - Consonant (C): Can be any consonant. (Onset is composed only of one consonant; consonant clusters are only found in loanwords, sometimes an epenthetic /a/~/æ/ is inserted between consonants.)
- Nucleus
  - Semivowel (S)
  - Vowel (V)
  - Semivowel (S)
- Coda
  - First consonant (C): Can be any consonant.
  - Second consonant (C): Can also be any consonant (mostly /d/, /g/, /k/, /s/, /t/, & /z/).

== Word accent ==
The Persian word-accent has been described as a stress accent by some, and as a pitch accent by others. In fact, the accented syllables in Persian are generally pronounced with a raised pitch as well as stress; but in certain contexts words may become deaccented and lose their high pitch.

From an intonational point of view, Persian words (or accentual phrases) usually have the intonation (L +) H* (where L is low and H* is a high-toned stressed syllable), e.g. کِتاب /kiˈtáːb/ 'book'; unless there is a suffix, in which case the intonation is (L +) H* + L, e.g. کتابم /kiˈtáːbam/ 'my book'. The last accent of a sentence is usually accompanied by a low boundary tone, which produces a falling pitch on the last accented syllable, e.g. کِتاب بُود /kiˈtâːb buːd/ 'it was a book'.

When two words are joined in an اِضافَه ezāfe construction, they can either be pronounced accentually as two separate words, e.g. مَرْدُمِ اِینْجا /marˈdúmi iːnˈd͡ʒáː/ 'the people (of) here', or else the first word loses its high tone and the two words are pronounced as a single accentual phrase: /marˈdumi iːnˈd͡ʒáː/. Words also become deaccented following a focused word; for example, in the sentence نامَهٔ مامانَم بُود رُو میز /naːˈmaji maːˈmaːnam buːd ruː meːz/ 'it was my mom's letter on the table' all the syllables following the word مامان /maːˈmaːn/ 'mom' are pronounced with a low pitch.

Knowing the rules for the correct placement of the accent is essential for proper pronunciation.

1. Accent is heard on the last stem-syllable of most words.
2. Accent is heard on the first syllable of interjections, conjunctions and vocatives. E.g. بله /ˈba.la/ ('yes'), نَخَیْر /ˈna.xajr/ ('no, indeed'), وَلی /ˈwa.leː/ ('but'), چِرا /ˈt͡ʃi.raː/ ('why'), اَگَر /ˈa.ɡar/ ('if'), مِرْسِی /ˈmir.siː/ ('thanks, merci'), خانُم /ˈxaː.num/ ('Ma'am'), آقا /ˈaː.qaː/ ('Sir'); cf. 4-4 below.
3. Never accented are:
  1. personal suffixes on verbs (/-am/ ('I do..'), /-iː/ ('you do..'), .., /-and/ ('they do..') (with two exceptions, cf. 4-1 and 5 below);
  2. the possessive and pronoun-object suffixes, /-am/, /-it/, /-iʃ/, &c.
  3. a small set of very common noun enclitics: the /ʔi.zaː.ˈfa/ اضافه (/-a/, /-ja/) ('of'), /-raː/ a definite direct object marker, /-iː/ ('a'), /-u/ ('and');
4. Always accented are:
  1. the personal suffixes on the positive future auxiliary verb (exception to 3-1 above);
  2. the negative verb prefix /na-/, /ni-/;
  3. if /na-/, /ne-/ is not present, then the first non-negative verb prefix (e.g. /meː-/ ('-ing'), /ba-/ ('do!') or the prefix noun in compound verbs (e.g. کار /kɒr/ in کار می‌کَرْدَم /ˈkaːr meː.kardam/);
  4. the last syllable of all other words, including the infinitive ending /-an/ and the participial ending /-ta/, /-da/ in verbal derivatives, noun suffixes like /-iː/ ('-ish') and /-a.ɡiː/, all plural suffixes (/-haː/, /-aːn/), adjective comparative suffixes (/-tar/, /-tariːn/), and ordinal-number suffixes (/-um/). Nouns not in the vocative are stressed on the final syllable: خانُم /xaː.ˈnum/ ('lady'), آقا /aː.ˈqaː/ ('gentleman'); cf. 2 above.
5. In the informal language, the present perfect tense is pronounced like the simple past tense. Only the word-accent distinguishes between these tenses: the accented personal suffix indicates the present perfect and the unstressed one the simple past tense (exception to 3-1 above):

Formal	Informal	Meaning
/diː.ˈda.am/ دِیدَه‌اَم	/diː.ˈdam/	'I have seen'
/ˈdiː.dam/ دِیدَم	/ˈdiː.dam/	'I saw'

== Colloquial Iranian Persian ==
When spoken formally, Iranian Persian is pronounced as written. But colloquial pronunciation as used by all classes makes a number of very common substitutions. Note that Iranians can interchange colloquial and formal sociolects in conversational speech. They include:

- In the Tehrani accent (and also most of the accents in the central and southern Iran), the sequence /ɒːn/ in the colloquial language is nearly always pronounced [uːn]. The only common exceptions are high prestige words, such as ایران [ʔiːˈɾɒːn] ('Iran'), and foreign nouns (both common and proper), like the Spanish surname بِلْتْران Beltrán [belˈtrɒːn], which are pronounced as written. A few words written as /ɒːm/ are pronounced [uːm], especially forms of the verb آمَدَن /ɒːmæˈdæn/ ('to come').
- In the Tehran accent, the unstressed direct object suffix marker را /ɾɒː/ is pronounced /ɾo(ː)/ after a vowel, and /o(ː)/ after a consonant.
- /h/ can be deleted in syllable-final position; e.g. کوه /kuːh/ ('mountain') -> [kuː].
- Some consonant clusters, especially /st/, can be simplified in syllable-final position; e.g. دَسْت /dæ(ː)st/ ('hand') -> [dæːs].
- The 2nd and 3rd person plural verb subject suffixes, written /-iːd/ and /-æ(ː)nd/ respectively, are pronounced [-iːn] and [-æ(ː)n].
- The stems of many frequently-occurring verbs have a short colloquial form, especially اَسْت /æ(ː)st/ ('he/she is'), which is colloquially shortened to /e/ after a consonant or /s/ after a vowel. Also, the stems of verbs which end in /h/, /v/ or a vowel are shortened; e.g. می‌خواهَم /ˈmiːxɒːhæ(ː)m/ ('I want') → [ˈmixɒːm], and می‌رَوَم /ˈmiːræ(ː)væ(ː)m/ ('I go' → [ˈmiræ(ː)m]).

== Example ==
Persian script	Cyrillic script	Gloss	IPA Transcription
Persian script	Cyrillic script	Gloss	Iranian Persian	Dari	Tajik
یک روز باد شمال و خورشید با هم دعوا می‌کردند که کدام یک قویتر است	Як рӯз боди шимолу хуршед бо ҳам даъво мекарданд ки кадом як қавитар аст.	One day the North Wind and the Sun were disputing which was the stronger.	[jek ruːz ˈbɒːde ʃoˈmɒːlo xoɾʃiːd bɒː hæ(ː)m dæ(ː)ʔvɒː ˈmiːkæ(ː)ɾdæ(ː)nd ke kodɒːm jek ɢæ(ː)viːtæ(ː)ɾ æ(ː)st]	[jæk ɾoːz ˈbɑːdɪ ʃʊˈmɑːlʊ xʊɾʃeːd bɑː hæm dæʔwɑː ˈmeːkæɾdænd kɪ kʊdɑːm jæk qæwiːtæɾ æst]	[jæk ɾɵz ˈbɔdi ʃiˈmɔlu xuɾʃed bɔ hæm dæʔvɔ ˈmekæɾdænd ki kædɔm jæk qævitæɾ æst]
