= Jaunpuri dialect (Garhwal) =

Northern Indo-Aryan dialect of India

Jaunpuri
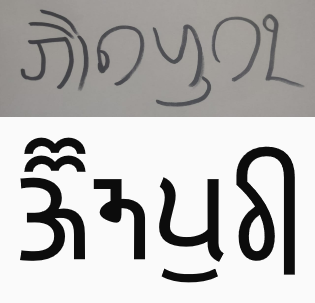
- jaunapurī written in Sirmauri-Jaunsari Takri (above) & Takri Scripts.
- Native to: India
- Region: Uttarakhand
- Language family: Indo-European: Indo-Iranian; Indo-Aryan; Northern; Jaunpuri

Language codes
- ISO 639-3: –
- Glottolog: jaun1244
- Jaunpuri speaking area Jaunpuri dialect (Garhwal) (India)
- Coordinates: 30.58466°N 78.15108°E

A native speaker discussing access to public information and welfare through Aadhaar in Jaunpuri in 2019

Jaunpuri (जौनपुरी) is a Northern Indo-Aryan dialect spoken in parts of the Garhwal division in the state of Uttarakhand, India. Its speakers are found in the Jaunpur development block in the east of Tehri Garhwal district and eastern parts of Dehradun district, which includes Mussoorie and nearby areas. Although a separate identity for Jaunpuri has been claimed, it is most commonly considered to be a dialect of Garhwali.

== Lexical similarity with neighbors ==
Lexical similarity
	% lexical similarity
Bangani	56%
Jaunsari	61%
Sirmauri	55%
Nagpuri	74%
