= Gundiyat Gaon =

Gundiyat Gaon Gundiyat Goun
- village
- Gundiyat Goun
- Country: India
- State: Uttarakhand
- District: Uttarkashi
  - Rank: One Of the Largest village of Uttarkashi
- Elevation: 1,550 m (5,090 ft)

Population
  - Total: 1,500 approx.

Languages
  - Official: Hindi
  - Native: Bangani
- Time zone: UTC+5:30 (IST)
- PIN: 249185
- Vehicle registration: UK 10
- Website: uk.gov.in

Gundiyat Gaon is a village located in the Rawain valley, in the foothills of the Himalaya, Uttarakhand, India.

The village is about 150 kilometres (93 mi) from Dehradun, capital of Uttarakhand and is at an altitude of 1,550 metres (5,090 ft). Gundiyat Gaon is the largest of the valley villages.

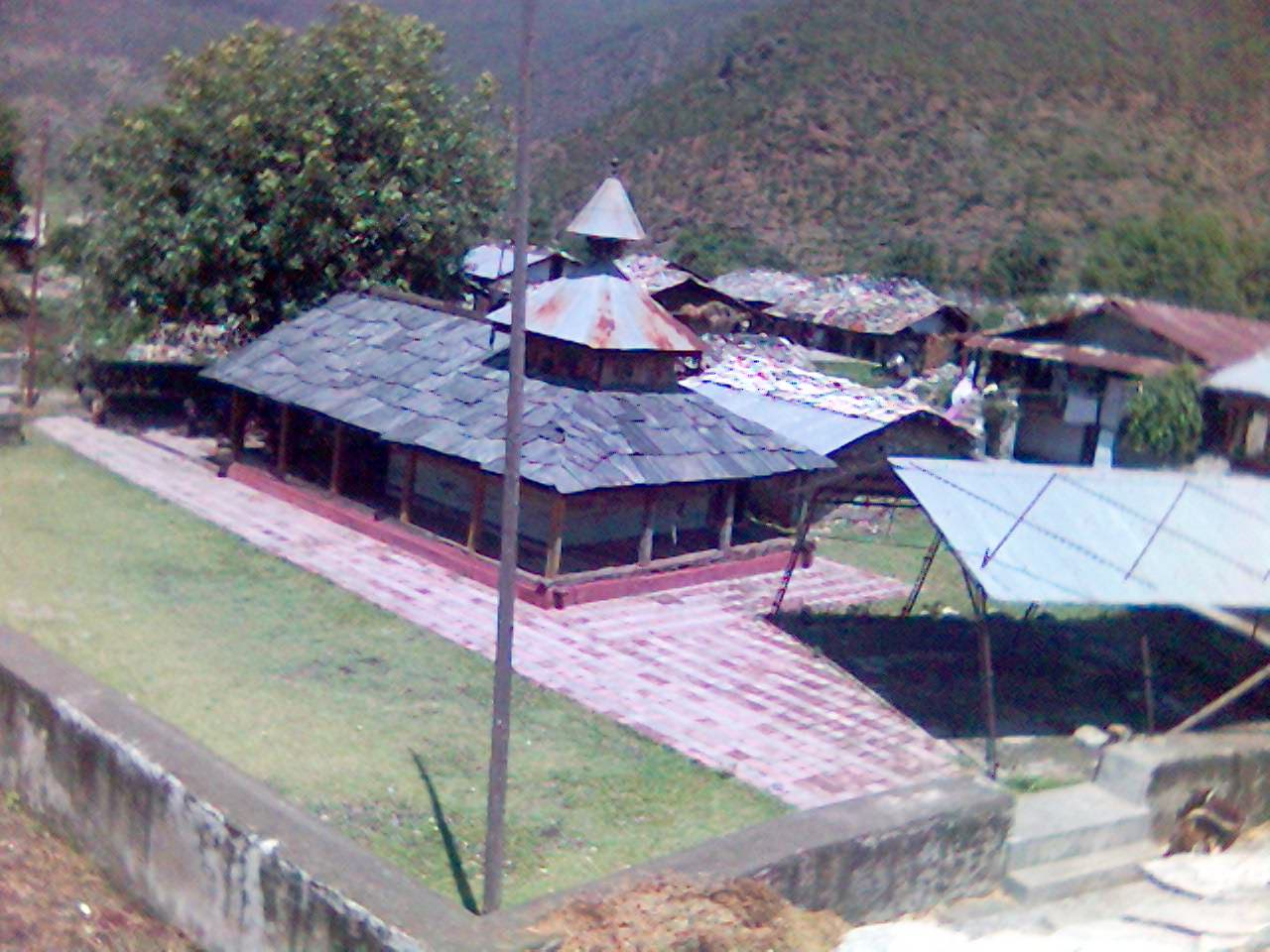
Village Temple in the middle of the village

There is a local deity temple in the middle of village. The temple has the idol of Kapil Muni Maharaj, Khandasuri Dev and Kali Mayya. The architecture of temple is an example of fine art of ancient time. The walls of the temple is made of large rectangular blocks of fine and rare stone. Each block has engravings on it, showing drawings of gods and various designs. There is also temple of Shiva, Kamleshwar, nearby the village. The temple has an ancient linga of Lord Shiva. People from far places come to visit the place in large number.

Gundiyat Goun is named after Late Shri Gundi Prasad Nautiyal .
