= Taradutt Gairola =

- तारा दत्त गैरोला
- Born: 6 June 1875; Tehri Garhwal
- Died: 28 May 1940 (aged 64)
- Occupations: Lawyer, Author, Editor
- Known for: Folklorist. Collecting & publishing Garhwali and other Indian folk traditions

Tara Dutt Gairola (1875–1940) was an Indian lawyer, writer, and editor. He is known as the pioneer of modern Garhwali poetry and for his contribution to Indian folk-lore, specially that of Garhwal, Uttarakhand.

Born in Dhal Dung village, patti Badiyar Garh in the princely state of Tehri Garhwal in 1875, Tara Dutt Gairola had a long and productive law career in Dehradun and Srinagar. He was also the editor of 'Garhwali' magazine. In his spare time, he collected heroic ballads and devotional songs performed by the 'Hurkiyas', the local bards of Uttarakhand. Eventually, he published these with E. Sherman Oakley as a co-author under Himalayan Folklore. This book collates the English translations of a form of Garhwali and Kumaoni folk heroic ballads called 'Veergatha'. Gairola is also known for 'The Songs of Dadu’ with a historical Introduction by Tara Dutt Gairola and a foreword by Annie Besant published in Benares City: The Indian Bookshop, Theosophical Society, (1929)

Tara Dutt Gairola edited the first ever Garhwali poetry collection ‘Garhwali Kavitavali’ consisting of a collection of poems by various modern Garhwali poets. Gairola was himself a Garhwali poet and he published his own book of Garhwali poetry called ‘Sadei' (सदेई) which was based on a Garhwali folklore.

== Selected publications ==
- Himalayan Folklore (Hardcover), ISBN 978-0836423914
- 2002 - Himalayan Folklore (Hardcover), ISBN 978-8177551297
- Himalayan Folklore: Ghosts and Demons from West Nepal
