= Abodh Bandhu Bahuguna =

Indian writer (1927–2004)

- Born: 15 June 1927; Pauri Garhwal
- Died: 2004 (aged 76–77)
- Occupations: Uttar Pradesh State Service; Deputy Director, Government of India
- Known for: Hindi and Garhwali poetry

Abodh Bandhu Bahuguna (15 June 1927 – 2004) was a Hindi and Garhwali writer and poet. He is known for his poems, epics, plays, folk-literature, and essays.

== Biography ==
Bahuguna was born in Jhala village, Chalaansyun, Pauri, Garhwal in what is presently Uttarakhand. He completed his Masters (M.A.) education in Hindi and Political Science from Nagpur University, served in the Uttar Pradesh State Service and retired as Deputy Director, Government of India. Bahuguna was a prolific writer and continued freelance writing after his retirement from his professional life.

== Selected publications ==
Garhwali Language

- Bhumyal
- Parvati
- Ghol
- Daisat
- Kankhila
- Gaad
- Myateki Ganga
- Shailvani

Hindi Language

- Dadga Hridaya
- Aranya Rodan
- Chakrachal
- Doobta Hua Gaon

== Awards ==
Abodh Bandhu Bahuguna received 2 awards from the Uttar Pradesh government and was also honoured with the Jai Shree Samman.
