= Srinagaria dialect =

Garhwali dialect of Uttarakhand, India

Srinagaria
- श्रीनगरिया srinagariya
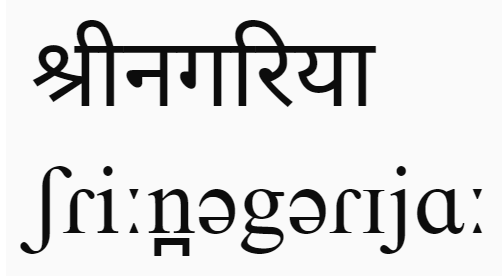
- Native to: India
- Region: Uttarakhand
- Language family: Indo-European: Indo-Iranian; Indo-Aryan; Northern; Central Pahari; Garhwali; Srinagaria

Language codes
- ISO 639-3: –
- Glottolog: srin1238
- Srinagaria speaking area Srinagaria dialect (India)
- Coordinates: 30.2195°N 78.7918°E

Srinagaria (or Srinagariya) is a dialect of Garhwali, belonging to the Central Pahari group (per Grierson). It is primarily spoken in the region around Srinagar, Garhwal in the Pauri Garhwal district of Uttarakhand state and is regarded as the Standard form of Garhwali.

== Script & specimen ==
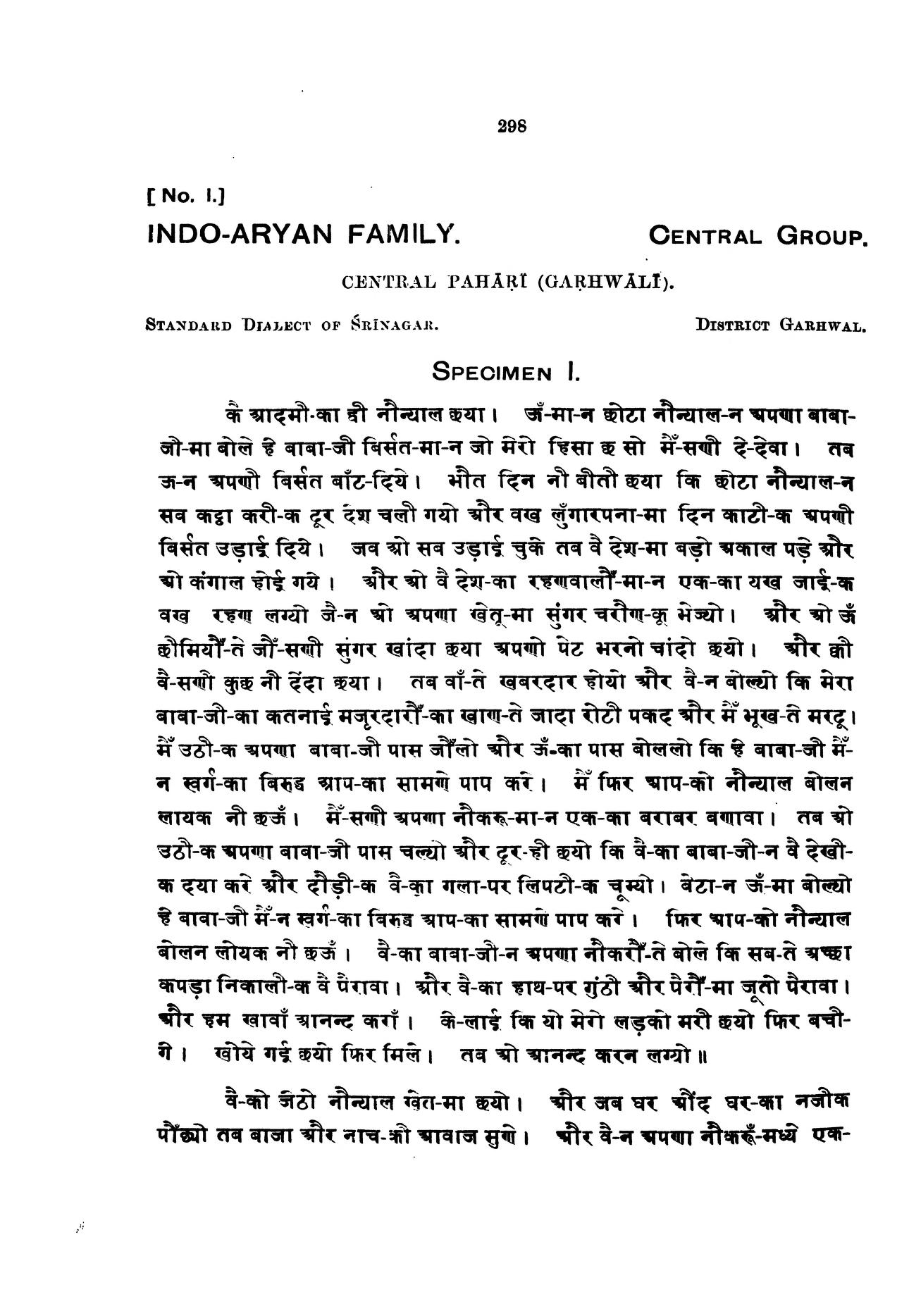
Sample of Srinagaria dialect from Grierson's book "Linguistic Survey of india"

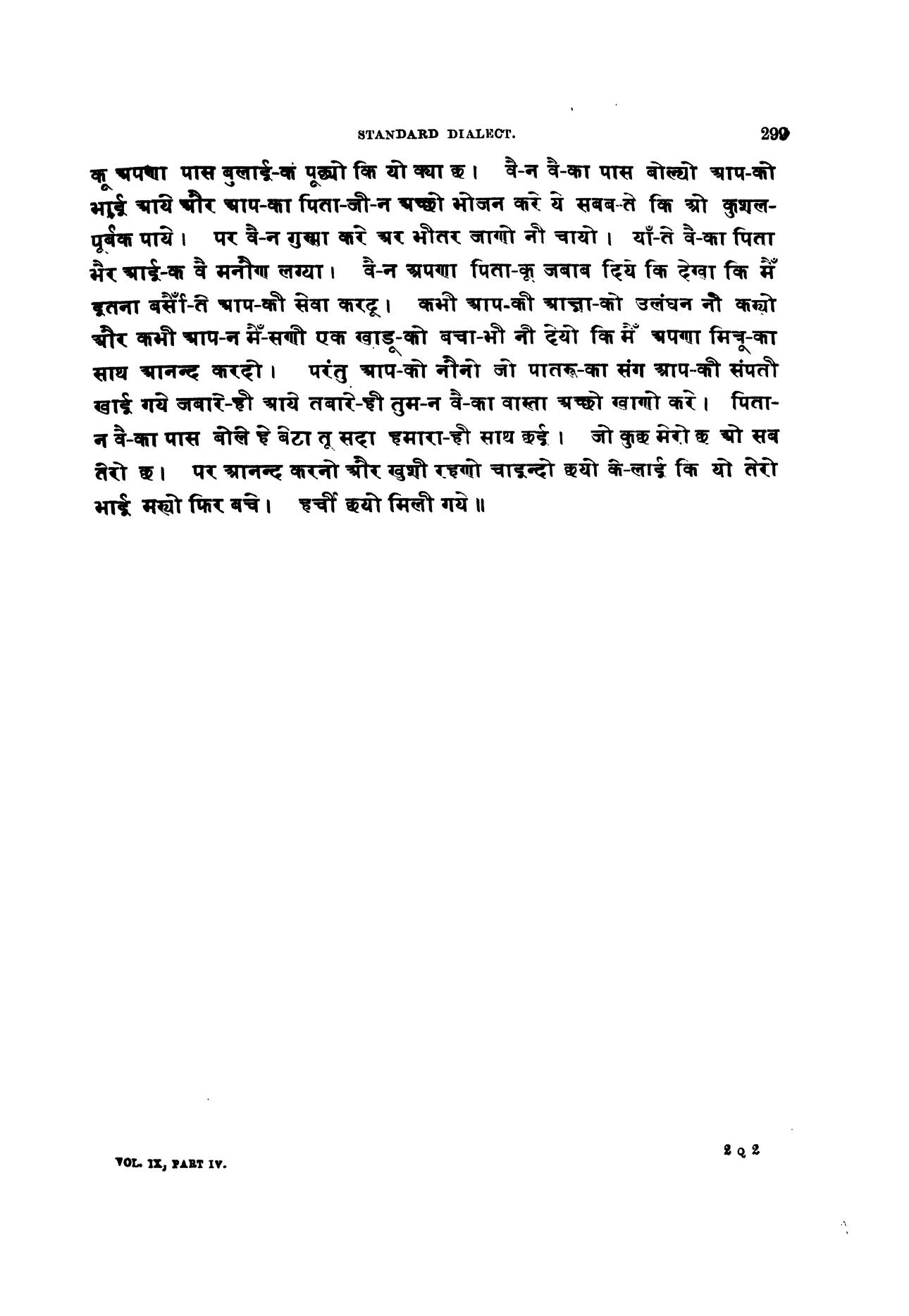
Sample of Srinagaria dialect from Grierson's book "Linguistic Survey of india"

== Comparative analysis ==
Words
Srinagaria	Rathwali	Translation
Bal	Latula	Hair
Baba ku	Babu Khuni	to a father/from a father
Lokhar	Luho	Iron
Nauno/Nauni	Laudo/Laudi	Boy/Girl
Hondo	Honnu	Being
Janaani	Siani	Woman
Ghar	Kudo	House
Khado ho	Thado ho	Stand up
Door	Tada	Far
Agadi/Pichhadi	Aghin/Pachhin	After/Before

Family and person terms
English	Standard	Rathwali	Tehriyali
Man	Mankhi	Manakha	Mans, Manakhi, Manas
Woman	Janani	Siani	Janani, bairan, kajan
Wife	Swain, janani	Sain, swin	Swain
Child	Nauno	Lauro	Nauno
Son	Nauno	Lauro	Larik, naunō
Daughter	Nauni	Lauri	Beṭi, nauni
Father	Baba	Baba, buba	Baba, buba
Mother	Boi	Boi	Boi, ija
Brother	Bhai, dada (elder), bhula (younger)	Bhai	Bhai (general), dada (elder), bhula (younger)
Sister	Bain, didi (elder), bhuli (younger)	Bain	Baini, bain (general), didi (elder), bhuli (younger)

Phrases
Srinagaria	Rathwali	Tehriyali	Translation
Mai marda	Mai mannu	Mardu	I beat
Tu mardi	Tu marni	Mardi	Thou beatest
Wo mard	Wo marn	Marda	He beats
Ham maarda	Ham maarnu	Marda	We beat
Tum marda	Tum maarni	Mardai	You beat
Wo mardin	Wo maani	Mardana	They beat
Main maare	Mi la maara	Mai-na mare	I beat(past)
Tin maare	Ti la maara	Ti-na mare	Thou beatest (past)
Wain maare	Wa la maara	Wai-na mare	He beat(past)
Haman maare	Hamu la maara	Ham-na mare	He beat (past)
Haman maare	Hamu la maara	Ham-na mare	We beat (past)
Tuman maare	Tumu la maara	Tum-na mare	You beat(past)
Un maare	Wunoon la maare	U-na mare	They beat(past)
Mai maarnu chhaun	Mi manu chhaun	Mai mardu chhau	I am beating
Mai marnu chhayo	Mi maarno chhoyo	Mai mardo thayo	I was beating
Main maaryun chhayo	Mai la maaryala	Mai-na mare	I had beaten
Main maaroon	Mi maaroon	Mai marau	I may beat
Main maarulo	Mi marulo	Mai marlo	I shall beat
Tu marilo	Tu maril	Tu maralyo, marilo	Thou wilt beat
Wo marlo	Wo marul	Wo marlo	He will beat
Ham maarla	Ham maala	Ham marla	We shall beat
Tum marilya	Tum malya	Tum maralya, marla	You will beat
Wo maarla	Wo maala	Wo marilya, marla	They will beat
