= Nagpuri dialect (Garhwal) =

Garhwali dialect of Uttarakhand, India

Nagpuri
- नागपुरी nāgapurī नागपुरिया nāgapuriyā
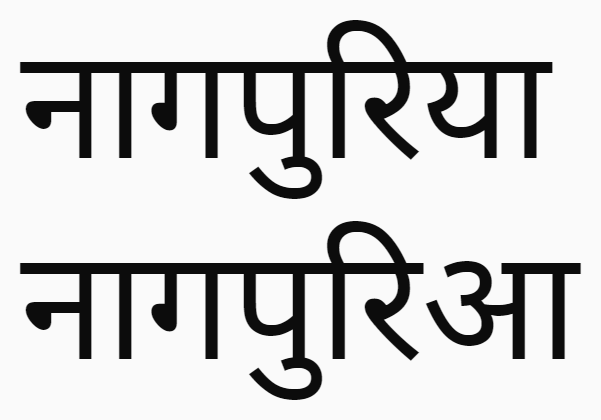
- Native to: India
- Region: Uttarakhand
- Language family: Indo-European: Indo-Iranian; Indo-Aryan; Northern; Central Pahari; Garhwali; Nagpuri

Language codes
- ISO 639-3: –
- Glottolog: nagp1247
- Nagpuria-speaking area Nagpuri dialect (Garhwal) (India)
- Coordinates: 30.2844°N 78.9811°E

Saradi speaking in Nagpuri

Nagpuri (or Nagpuriya) is spoken in the Rudraprayag district of Uttarakhand state. Currently it has been classified as a dialect under Garhwali, belonging to the Central Pahari group (as per Grierson). It is practically the same as Dasaulya and Majh-Kumaiy.

== Lexical similarity with neighbors ==
Lexical similarity
	% lexical similarity
Bangani	59%
Jaunpuri	61%
Sirmauri	58%
Jaunsari	60%

== Grammar ==
Pronouns
Pronoun	Devanagari	IPA
I	मैँ	məɪ̃
thou	तुम	t̪umə
you	तू	t̪uː
us	हम	ɦəmə
he	सु/ओ	s̪u
she	स्या	s̪jɑː
they	सि	s̪ɪ
them	तौं	t̪əũ

Cases
Case	Hindi	Translation
न	ने	by
ते	को	to
मुके	से(द्वारा)	using
ते	के लिए	for
बटिन	से	from(as in from A to B)
कु	का,की,के	of
मा	में	in
मु	पर	on

Prepositions
Preposition	IPA	Translation
मधे		middle/among
तख		there
वख		there(closer)
माँ		in

== Script & specimen ==
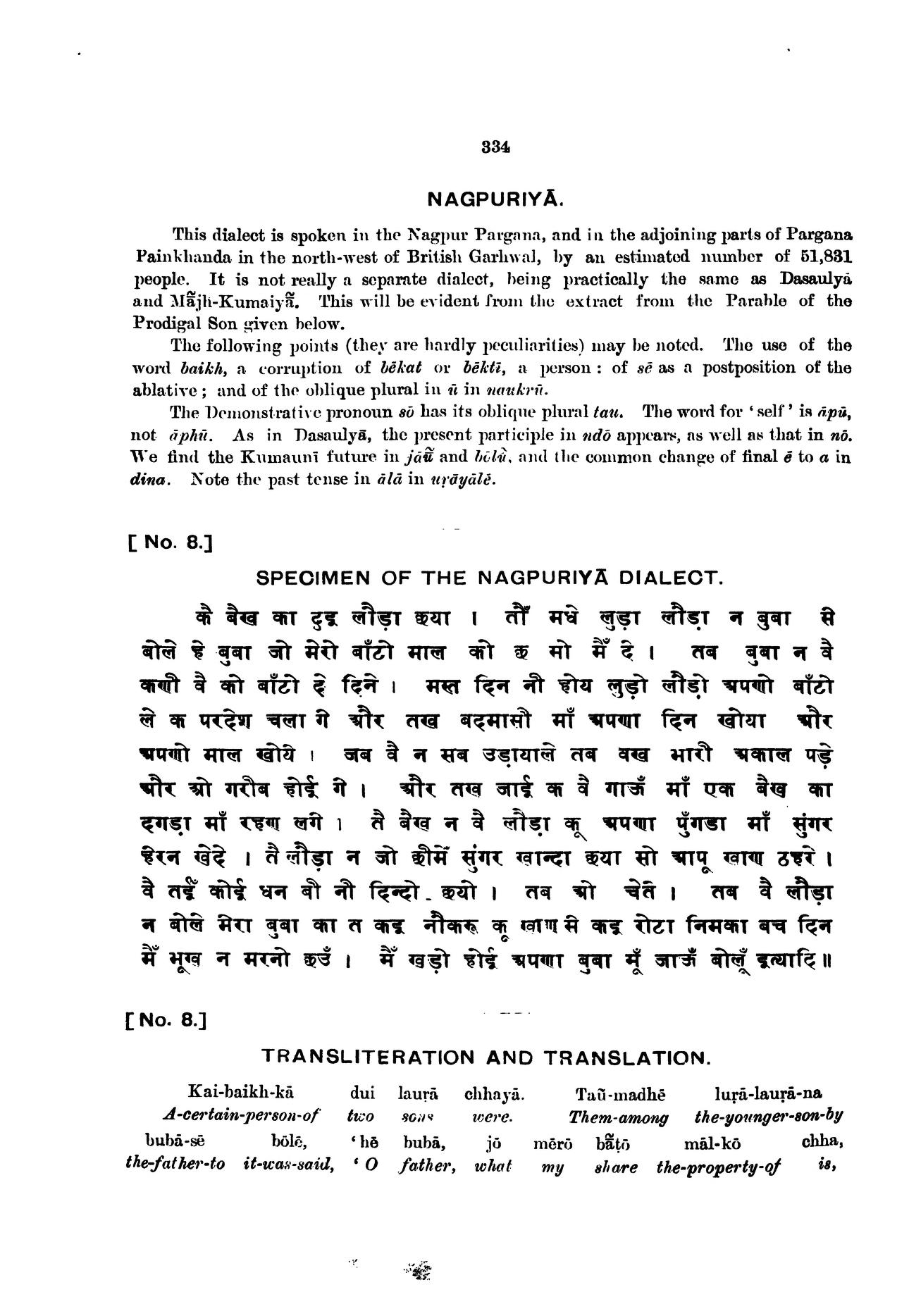
A specimen in Nagpuri from Grierson's LSI.
