= Rathwali dialect =

Garhwali dialect of Uttarakhand, India

Rathwali
- राठवाली राठी
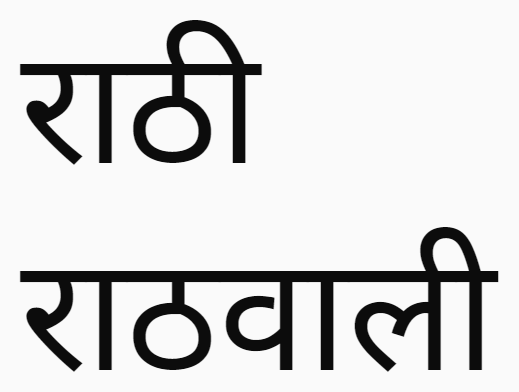
- Native to: India
- Region: Uttarakhand
- Language family: Indo-European: Indo-Iranian; Indo-Aryan; Northern; Central Pahari; Garhwali; Rathwali

Language codes
- ISO 639-3: –
- Glottolog: rath1241
- Rathi-speaking area Rathwali dialect (India)
- Coordinates: 30.020775°N 79.049420°E

Rathwali (rāṭhavālī) or Rathi is spoken in the north of Salani throughout the centre of the District of Garhwal, over the greater parts of the Chandpur and Dewalgarh Parganas today's Thailisain block and surrounding areas in Pauri Garhwal district of Uttarakhand state. Currently it has been classified as a dialect under Garhwali, belonging to the Central Pahari group(as per Grierson). It is the language of the Khasiyas.

== Grammar ==
Gender :

Rules for gender are same as Srinagaria.

Number :

Tadbhava masc. nouns which end with a in Hindi, in Rathwali end with o. However some exceptions exist.

Cases :

Cases
Case	
agent	न, ल
accusative	गणी
instrumental	न, ल
dative	गणी(to), खुणी(to) थां(to), कूं(for)
ablative	गणी(from), मकोई(from), बटी(from) उण्डे(out of), मांय-ल(among), से , ते
genitive	को
locative	मा(in, into), माँ(in, into), गणी(in), पार(on), तल(below)

Adjectives :

Follows same rules as Srinagaria, however the final a is changed into a.

Pronouns :

Personal
	sing.	pul.
nom.	mi, mi tu,tu	ham, hamu tum,tumu
ag,	mi-la, mai-la ti-la, twe- la	hamu-la, ham-na tumu-la, tum-na
gen.	mero, myoro	tero, tyoro
obl.	mai, mi, mi tai, ti, twa	ham, hamu tum, tumu

Demonstrative
	sing.	pul.
nom.	yo wo	yo,yu wo,wu
obl.	yai wai, we,wi	wo, wu un, wun, u, wu

Relative
	sing.	pul.
nom.	jo, ju	jo
obl.	jai, je	jau

Correlative
	sing.	pul.
nom.	so	so
obl.	tai, te	tau

Reflexive Pronoun is aaphu

Conjugation :

Auxiliary Verbs & Verbs Substantive

Present
	sing.	pul.
I am	chhū, chhaū	chhawā
thou art	chhai,chhaī	chhavu
he is	chha, cha	chhī

Past
	sing.	pul.
was	chhayō(masc) chhayā(fem)	chhōyō(masc) chhāyā

== Comparative analysis ==
Words
Srinagaria	Rathwali	Translation
Bal	Latula	Hair
Baba te	Babu gani	To a father/from a father
Lokhar	Luho	Iron
Nauno/Nauni	Laudo/Laudi	Boy/Girl
Hondo	Honnu	Being
Janaani	Siani	Woman
Ghar	Kudo	House
Khado ho	Thado ho	Stand up
Door	Tada	Far
Agadi/Pichhadi	Aghin/Pachhin	After/Before

Family and person terms
English	Srinagaria	Rathwali	Tehriyali
Man	Mankhi	Manakha	Mans, Manakhi, Manas
Woman	Janani	Siani	Janani, bairan, kajan
Wife	Swain, janani	Sain, swin	Swain
Child	Nauno	Lauro	Nauno
Son	Nauno	Lauro	Larik, nauno
Daughter	Nauni	Lauri	Beṭi, nauni
Father	Baba	Baba, buba	Baba, buba
Mother	Boi	Boi	Boi, ija
Brother	Bhai, dada (elder), bhula (younger)	Bhai	Bhai (general), dada (elder), bhula (younger)
Sister	Bain, didi (elder), bhuli (younger)	Bain	Baini, bain (general), didi (elder), bhuli (younger)

Phrases
Srinagaria	Rathwali	Translation
mai marda	mai mannu	I beat
tu mardi	tu marni	thou beatest
wo mard	wo marn	he beats
ham maarda	ham maarnu	we beat
tum marda	tum maarni	you beat
wo mardin	wo maani	they beat
main maare	mi la maara	I beat(past)
tin maare	ti la maara	thou beatest (past)
wain maare	wa la maara	he beat(past)
haman maare	hamu la maara	we beat (past)
tuman maare	tumu la maara	you beat(past)
un maare	wunoon la maare	they beat(past)
mai maarnu chhaun	mi manu chhaun	I am beating
mai marnu chhayo	mi maarno chhoyo	I was beating
main maaryun chhayo	mai la maaryala	I had beaten
main maaroon	mi maaroon	I may beat
main maarulo	mi marulo	I shall beat
tu marilo	tu maril	thou wilt beat
wo marlo	wo marul	he will beat
ham maarla	ham maala	we shall beat
tum marilya	tum malya	you will beat
wo maarla	wo maala	they will beat

== Script & specimen ==
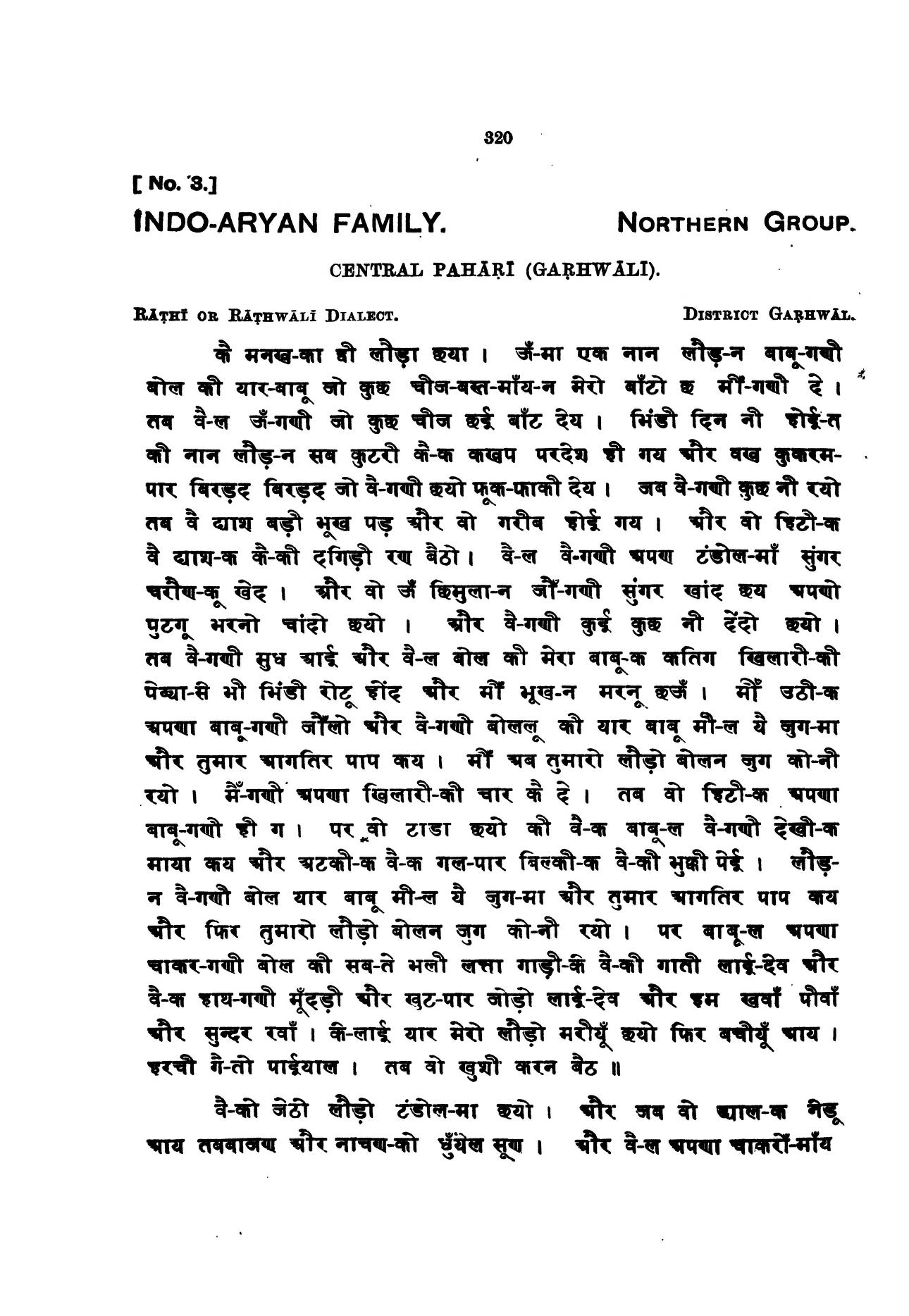
Sample of Rathi from Grierson's book
