= Silent vāv =

Element of Persian, Urdu and Shahmukhi orthography

The silent wāw or silent vāv (Persian: واو معدوله, romanized: Wāw-i Ma'dūla; Punjabi/Urdu: واؤ معدولہ, romanized: Wā'ō-i Ma'dūla) is an element of Persian, Punjabi as well as Urdu orthography resulting when a wāw is preceded by khā and often followed by an alif or yā, forming the combination of خوا or خوی, in which the wāw is silenced. It is always written but not typically spoken, except for in certain eastern Persian dialects wherein it is pronounced. If not followed by a long vowel, the wāw following a khā sometimes adopts the [u] (in Iranian Persian [o]) sound of the short vowel damma/pesh. It was also formerly made use of when dealing with Persian loanwords in the Arabic scripts of Turkic languages, particularly in Ottoman Turkish, Azerbaijani, Chagatai, etc.

== History ==
=== Historical development ===
The silent wāw occurs only in words of Iranian origin, and is not present in any Turkic or Arabic loanwords that entered the language. Words in Middle Persian (as well as in the Early New Persian) containing the labialised voiceless velar fricative [xʷ] preceding a long vowel developed such that the sound underwent delabialization and simply became the voiceless velar fricative [x] (this started around the onset of the Classical Persian). In cases where it preceded the short open front unrounded vowel [a] (in Iranian, Afghan and Tajiki Persian alike, near-open front unrounded vowel [æ]) it delabialised and took on the sound of the close back rounded vowel [u] (in Iranian Persian accent, close-mid back rounded vowel [o]), evolving from [xʷa] to [xu] (and in Iranian Persian, to [xo]). Despite this, the written language continues to reflect the old standards of pronunciation; hence the silent wāw remains written. These linguistic evolutions did not take place in certain areas of Greater Iran (as well as to a certain extent in the Indian subcontinent, usually somewhat preserved in the orthographies of the Indian languages using the Brahmic scripts). Thus, certain dialects do not have the silent wāw as a feature.

=== In poetry ===
Historically, sometimes poetic usages of the silent wāw did not follow the traditional literary rules and guidelines. This can be seen in the following poem by Sa'adi in his Bustan book:

مخنّث که بیداد بر خود کند

muxannas̱ ki bēdād bar xwad kunad

از آن به که با دیگری بد کند

az ān bih ki bā dīgarī bad kunad

Phonetic transcription:

[moxænˈnæs kʰe biːˈdɒːd bæɾ xæd ˈkʰonæd]
[æz ɒːn beh kʰe bɒː diːˈɡæɾiː bæd ˈkʰonæd]

English translation:

A coward [Mukhannath] who inflicts on himself wrong
Is better than the man who harms the throng.

According to the Afghan Persian (Dari) literary rules, خود should be pronounced as [xud] (and in Iranian Persian [xod]); however, as is visible in this poem, it atypically takes on the sound of [xʷað] and rhymes with بد [bað] in the verse following it. This silent wāw taking on the sound of fatha/zabar [a] (Iranian, Afghan and Tajiki Persian alike [æ]), rather than the [u] (Iranian Persian [o]) of damma/pesh, is a very common feature in the Early New Persian (and even in the Classical Persian as well) poetry, also seen, for example, in the works of Ferdowsi and Nizami Ganjavi.

== Geographical distribution ==
The standard Iranian form (especially the Tehrani dialect) of Persian does not pronounce the silent wāw in any situation. Tajiki Persian, which has undergone delabialization in the same way as Iranian Persian, is written in the modified Cyrillic script (based on the Russian letters), and thus does not have the silent wāw as an orthographic feature. However, many Afghan dialects of Persian (commonly known as Dari), as well as the Persian dialects of Kashan and some other (particularly eastern parts) regions of Iran, continue to pronounce the wāw, meaning that the silent wāw is not a feature of the orthography of their dialects. In Urdu, as well as Punjabi and Saraiki, labialization is retained in some words and not others.

== Examples ==
Persian	Persian pronunciation		Persian romanization		Urdu pronuncation	English translation
Persian	present wāw	silent wāw	present wāw	silent wāw	Urdu pronuncation	English translation
خویش	[xʷeːʃ]	[xiːʃ]	xwēš	xiš	[x(w)eːʃ]	oneself
خواب	[xʷaːb]	[xɒːb]	xwāb	xâb	[x(w)ɑːb]	sleep / dream
خوش	[xʷaʃ]	[xoʃ]	xwaš	xoš	[xʊʃ]	good / happy
