= Jeet Singh Negi =

Indian composer (1925–2020)

Jeet Singh Negi (2 February 1925 – 21 June 2020) was a music composer, singer, lyricist, writer and director from the Garhwal region of Uttarakhand, India. He is considered to be the father of modern Garhwali folk music.

== Early life ==
Jeet Singh Negi was born on 2 February 1925 in Ayal village in Paidalsyun in Pauri Garhwal, Uttarakhand, India to Sultan Singh Negi and Roopdeyi Negi. He received his education at various places like Pauri Garhwal (India), Maymyo (present day Pyin Oo Lwin, Myanmar) and Lahore (Pakistan).

== Music career ==
Negi began his career in the late 1940s. Negi is the first Garhwali singer whose compilation of six Garhwali folk songs was recorded on gramophone by the Young India Gramophone Company of Bombay in 1949. He was the first to give voice to Garhwali language and sentiments as far back as the 1940s and became a Garhwali institution in Dehradun in the post-independence period. Negi also worked as a deputy music director at National Gramophone Company, Mumbai.

== Major works ==
His play Bhari Bhool was first staged in 1952, at Damodar Hall, Mumbai in the program of Garhwal Bhratri Mandal. The play was instant hit and the drama stirred not only the mindset of migrated Garhwali Mumbaikars but across India, migrated Garhwali became aware about the importance of drama in their cultural programs. The dialogues are in Hindi and Garhwali and that was the unique experiencing point, Singh Negi was conceptualized, wrote, directed and stage managed Bhari Bhool. Bhari Bhool is a milestone in the history of Garhwali stage and cultural programs. Himalaya Kala Sangam, Delhi staged this drama in 1954-55. Later on this drama was staged in many places and many times. Sudharani a research scholar of Garhwali drama writes, " Is natak ko dekhne sabhi jagah darshak toot pade and this was the reason that Lalit Mohan thapliyal entered in Garhwal drama taking leave from Hindi drama.

Maletha Ki Kool: This is historical drama and based on the Maletha Canal built by Chief of army staff of Garhwali a sovereign kingdom, the winning warrior of Tibet and father of brave bhud Gajendra Singh Madho singh Bhandari. The drama has been staged 18 (eighteen) times in Dehradun, Mumbai, Delhi, Chandigarh, Mussorie, Tihri and many places. Singh Negi wrote and directed this drama.

Jeetu Bagdwal: Jitu Bagdwal is famous in the folklore of Garhwal. Jeetu Bagdwal was a brilliant flutist. Singh wrote the musical drama of this folklore and more than eight times this melodious drama was staged at various places under his direction and stage administration.

Pativrata Rami: Parvatiya Munch Delhi staged the Hindi drama Rami Baurani conceived and created by Singh Negi in 1956 and it was staged many more times.

Rami: On the occasion of Tagore centenary year, Rami a Garhwali musical drama (geet natika ) was staged first in Narendra Nagar in 1961. Later on more than one hundred stage shows have been staged all across India.

Raju Postman: This is a Dhabadi Garhwali drama and dialogues are mixed Hindi and Garhwali. Raju Poastman Garhwal Sabha Chandigarh staged this dhabadi drama first and more than ten times this drama has been staged.

Relays from Akashvani : His first Garhwali song was relayed from Akashvani in 1954. His dramas and songs were relayed more than 600 times and it is great achievement for any regional language artist. Jeetu Bagdwal and Maletha ki Koo the radio-geet-natika were also relayed more than 50 times from Akashvani.

Relays from Doordarshan: The Hindi version of Rami was relayed by Delhi Doordarshan.
