= Tehriyali dialect =

Garhwali dialect of Uttarakhand, India

Tehriyali
- टिहरीयाली गंगापारिया
- Native to: India
- Region: Uttarakhand
- Language family: Indo-European: Indo-Iranian; Indo-Aryan; Northern; Central Pahari; Garhwali; Tehriyali

Language codes
- ISO 639-3: –
- Glottolog: tehr1243
- Tehriyali speaking area Tehriyali dialect (India)
- Coordinates: 30.3821°N 78.4464°E

Tehriyali or (Gangapariya) or simply (Tehri Garhwali) is a dialect of Garhwali, belonging to the Central Pahari group (per Grierson). It is mostly spoken in the Tehri Garhwal district of Uttarakhand state.

== Comparative analysis ==
Phrases
| Srinagaria | Rathwali | Tehriyali | Translation |
|---|---|---|---|
| Mai marda | Mai mannu | Mardu | I beat |
| Tu mardi | Tu marni | Mardi | Thou beatest |
| Wo mard | Wo marn | Marda | He beats |
| Ham maarda | Ham maarnu | Marda | We beat |
| Tum marda | Tum maarni | Mardai | You beat |
| Wo mardin | Wo maani | Mardana | They beat |
| Main maare | Mi la maara | Mai-na mare | I beat(past) |
| Tin maare | Ti la maara | Ti-na mare | Thou beatest (past) |
| Wain maare | Wa la maara | Wai-na mare | He beat(past) |
| Haman maare | Hamu la maara | Ham-na mare | We beat (past) |
| Tuman maare | Tumu la maara | Tum-na mare | You beat(past) |
| Un maare | Wunoon la maare | U-na mare | They beat(past) |
| Mai maarnu chhaun | Mi manu chhaun | Mai mardu chhau | I am beating |
| Mai marnu chhayo | Mi maarno chhoyo | Mai mardo thayo | I was beating |
| Main maaryun chhayo | Mai la maaryala | Mai-na mare | I had beaten |
| Main maaroon | Mi maaroon | Mai marau | I may beat |
| Main maarulo | Mi marulo | Mai marlo | I shall beat |
| Tu marilo | Tu maril | Tu maralyo, marilo | Thou wilt beat |
| Wo marlo | Wo marul | Wo marlo | He will beat |
| Ham maarla | Ham maala | Ham marla | We shall beat |
| Tum marilya | Tum malya | Tum maralya, marla | You will beat |
| Wo maarla | Wo maala | Wo marilya, marla | They will beat |

Family and person terms
| English | Srinagaria | Rathwali | Tehriyali |
|---|---|---|---|
| Man | Mankhi | Manakha | Mans, Manakhi, Manas |
| Woman | Janani | Siani | Janani, bairan, kajan |
| Wife | Swain, janani | Sain, swin | Swain |
| Child | Nauno | Lauro | Nauno |
| Son | Nauno | Lauro | Larik, nauno |
| Daughter | Nauni | Lauri | Beṭi, nauni |
| Father | Baba | Baba, buba | Baba, buba |
| Mother | Boi | Boi | Boi, ija |
| Brother | Bhai, dada (elder), bhula (younger) | Bhai | Bhai (general), dada (elder), bhula (younger) |
| Sister | Bain, didi (elder), bhuli (younger) | Bain | Baini, bain (general), didi (elder), bhuli (younger) |

== Script & specimen ==
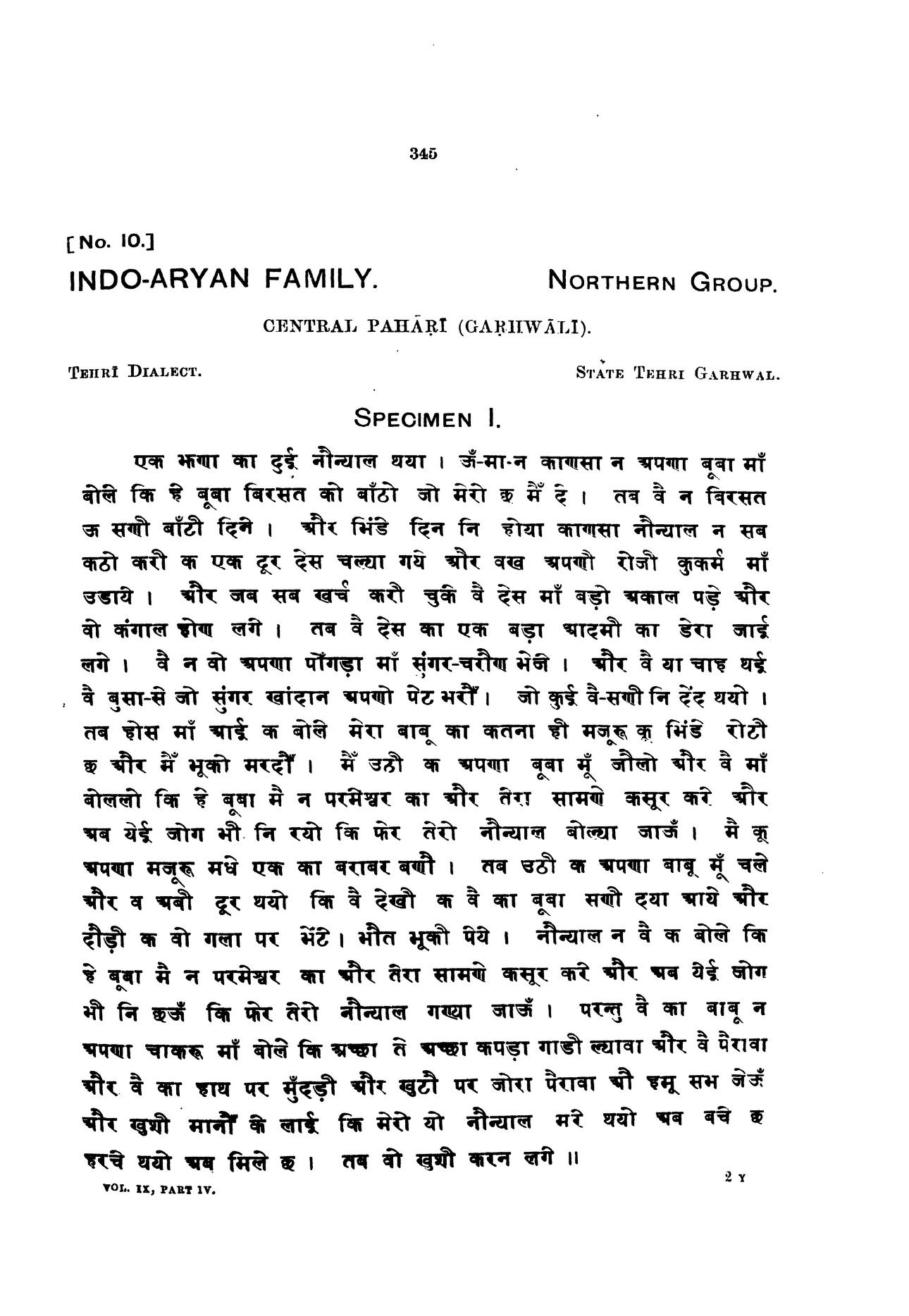
Sample of Tehriyali dialect from Grierson's book "Linguistic Survey of india"

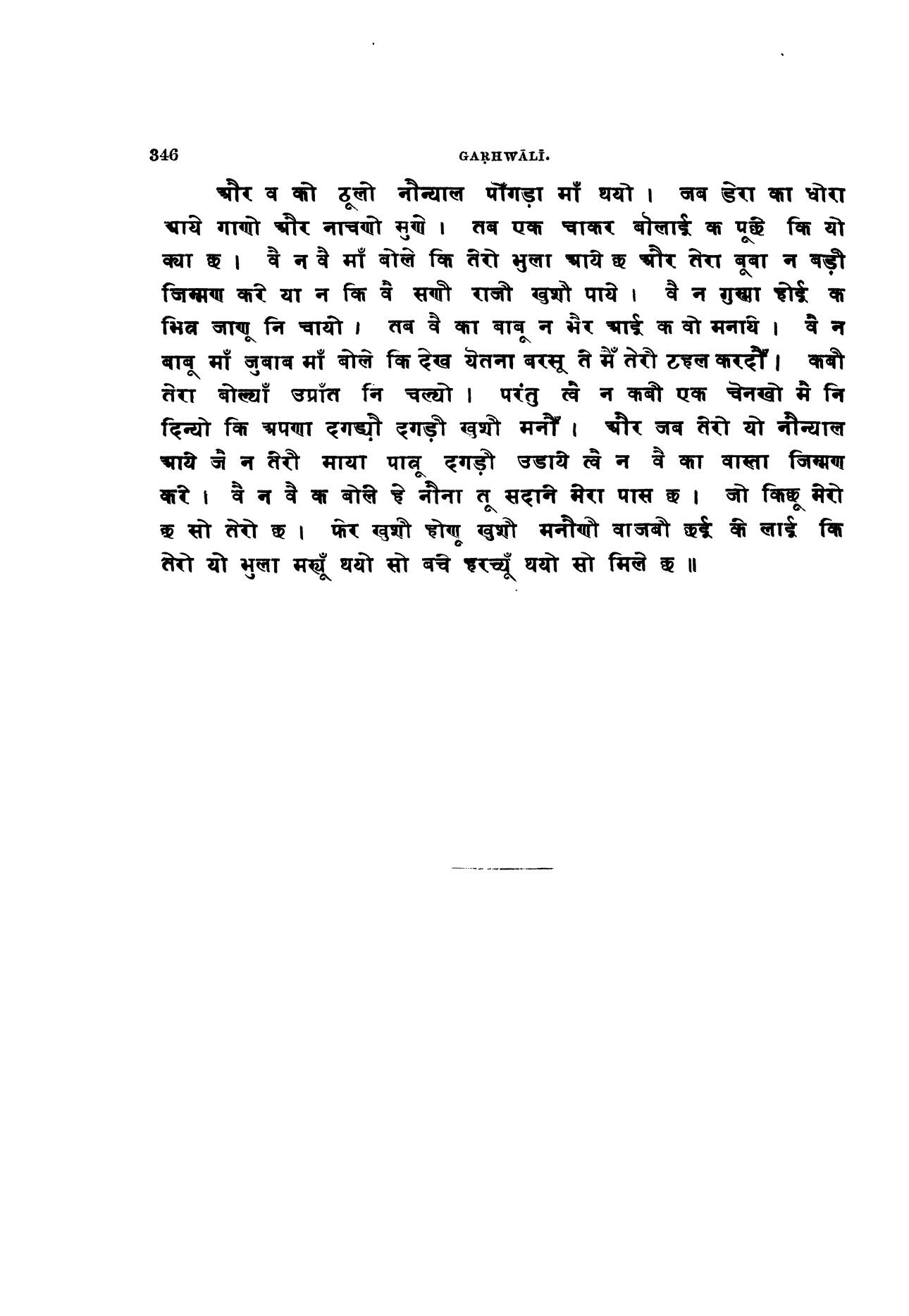
Sample of Tehriyali dialect from Grierson's book "Linguistic Survey of india"
