= Central Pahari =

Grouping of Northern Indo-Aryan languages Spoken in Uttarakhand

- Geographic distribution: Uttarakhand
- Linguistic classification: Indo-European: Indo-Iranian; Indo-Aryan; Northern Indo-Aryan; Central Pahari
- Subdivisions: Garhwali; Kumaoni

Language codes
- Glottolog: cent1977

Central Pahari is a traditional linguistic grouping of Indo-Aryan languages spoken principally in the Central Himalayas, particularly in the Garhwal and Kumaon regions of Uttarakhand, India. The two languages most commonly associated with the group are Garhwali and Kumaoni. Modern linguistic databases treat Garhwali and Kumaoni as separate languages rather than as dialects of a single standardized language.

The term Central Pahari became prominent through the work of George Abraham Grierson and the Linguistic Survey of India. Grierson divided the Pahari languages into Eastern, Central and Western groups. His Central Pahari group included Garhwali and Kumaoni and documented numerous regional varieties of the two languages.

== Classification ==
Glottolog recognizes Central Pahari as a grouping and separately recognizes Garhwali and Kumaoni as languages.

 Indo-European
 Indo-Iranian
 Indo-Aryan
 Northern Indo-Aryan
 Central Pahari
 Garhwali
 Kumaoni

The ThoT language database lists Central Pahari with Garhwali and Kumaoni as its principal languages. Garhwali is assigned ISO 639-3 code gbm, while Kumaoni is assigned kfy.

== Languages ==
=== Garhwali ===
Garhwali (गढ़वाली) is an Indo-Aryan language primarily spoken in the Garhwal region of Uttarakhand. It is traditionally classified as a Central Pahari language and is recognized as a separate language by modern linguistic databases.

Garhwali has the ISO 639-3 code gbm and Glottocode garh1243.

The language contains numerous regional varieties. Historical descriptions include varieties associated with Tehri, Srinagar, Pauri, Chamoli, Rudraprayag, and Uttarkashi, among other areas. Grierson's survey recorded Garhwali varieties including Rathwali, Lohbya, Badhani, Dasaulya, Majh-Kumaiya, Nagpuri, Salani and Tehriyali.

=== Kumaoni ===
Kumaoni (कुमाऊँनी) is an Indo-Aryan language spoken principally in the Kumaon division of Uttarakhand. It is traditionally classified as a Central Pahari language and is recognized as a separate language in modern linguistic databases.

Kumaoni has the ISO 639-3 code kfy and Glottocode kuma1273.

Grierson recorded numerous Kumaoni varieties, including Khasparjiya, Phaldakotiya, Pachhai, Kumaoni of Naini Tal, Kumaiya, Chaugarkhiya, Gangola, Danpuriya, Soriyali, Askoti, Sirali and Johari.

== Geographic distribution ==
Central Pahari languages are concentrated in the central Himalayan region of northern India.

=== Garhwal ===
Garhwali is primarily associated with Garhwal, the western part of Uttarakhand. Its traditional area includes the districts and valleys of the Garhwal Himalaya.

Garhwali-speaking communities are also found outside Garhwal as a result of migration to other parts of India, particularly major urban centres.

=== Kumaon ===
Kumaoni is primarily associated with Kumaon, in eastern Uttarakhand. Major areas of Kumaoni speech include Almora, Bageshwar, Champawat, Nainital and Pithoragarh districts.

Kumaoni is also spoken in bordering areas of Nepal and Uttarakhand.

== Language status and preservation ==
Garhwali and Kumaoni are not included among the languages listed in the Eighth Schedule to the Constitution of India.

Both languages nevertheless have established literary and cultural traditions.

Linguistic documentation has been carried out through academic research, dictionaries, grammars, oral-history projects and digital databases.

Glottolog provides separate language entries for Garhwali and Kumaoni and links them to extensive bibliographical material.

== See also ==
- Garhwali language
- Kumaoni language
- Pahari languages
- Northern Indo-Aryan languages
- Languages of India
- Languages of Uttarakhand
- Linguistic Survey of India
- George Abraham Grierson
