= Garhwali language =

Central Pahari language spoken in India

Garhwali
- गढ़वळि
- 'Garhwali' as spelled in Devanagari.
- Native to: Uttarakhand
- Region: Garhwal
- Ethnicity: Garhwali
- Native speakers: 2.4 million (2011 census) (Note: Official census results conflate some speakers with Hindi.)
- Language family: Indo-European: Indo-Iranian; Indo-Aryan; Northern; Central Pahari; Garhwali
- Early form: Khas Prakrit
- Writing system: Devanagari

Language codes
- ISO 639-3: gbm
- Glottolog: garh1243
- ELP: Garhwali

Garhwali (गढ़वळि, IPA: [gɜɽʱʋɜɭiˑ], in native pronunciation) is an Indo-Aryan language of the Central Pahari subgroup. It is primarily spoken by over 2.4 million Garhwali people in the Garhwal division of the northern Indian state of Uttarakhand in the Indian Himalayas.

Garhwali has a number of regional dialects. It is not an endangered language (Ethnologue lists it as "vigorous"), it is nonetheless designated as "vulnerable" in UNESCO's Atlas of the World's Languages in Danger, which indicates that the language requires consistent conservation efforts.

== Names ==
Ethnologue has catalogued alternate names by which Garhwali is known such as Gadhavali, Gadhawala, Gadwahi, Gashwali, Girwali, Godauli, Gorwali, Gurvali, and Pahari Garhwali. These alternate names of the language may have come from the speakers having more than one name for their language, or variant Romanisations of what is essentially the same name. Gadwallis schollar Gadwall's Kukareithi use Gadwallis or Gaddish for all literary & legal purpose.

== Geographical distribution ==
Garhwali is spoken primarily by people in Tehri Garhwal, Pauri Garhwal, Uttarkashi, Chamoli and Rudraprayag districts of Garhwal division in the state of Uttarakhand. Garhwali is also spoken by Garhwali migrants to other parts of India including Himachal Pradesh, Delhi, Haryana, Punjab, Uttar Pradesh, Madhya Pradesh, Maharashtra, and Chandigarh.

According To 2011 Census
State	Population
Delhi	71,476
Uttar Pradesh	22,914
Maharashtra	14,401
Haryana	12,207
Chandigarh	8,265
Punjab	7,338
Madhya Pradesh	4,859
Himachal Pradesh	4,229
Rajasthan	4,080
Jammu and Kashmir	1,544

According to the 2001 Census of Languages in India, there were 2,267,314 Garhwali language speakers. As per the latest 2011 Census of Languages in India, there are an estimated 2,482,089 speakers, and as of 2022, Ethnologue uses the same estimate. There are 2,322,406 speakers in Uttarakhand, while there are 159,683 speakers outside Uttarakhand of which half or more lives in National Capital Region.

== History ==
Princely flag of Kingdom of Garhwal

Historically, in the Middle Indo-Aryan period there were a variety of languages called Prakrits. Of these, Khas Prakrit is believed to be the source of Garhwali.

The earliest form of Garhwali can be traced to the 10th century, found in numismatics, royal seals, inscriptional writings on copper plates and temple stones containing royal orders and grants. One example is the temple grant inscription of King Jagatpal at Dev Prayag in 1335 CE. Most Garhwali literature is preserved in folk form, passed down orally. However, since the 18th century, Garhwali has developed a literary tradition. Until the 17th century, Garhwal was always a sovereign nation under the Garhwali Kings. Naturally, Garhwali was the official language of the Garhwal Kingdom.

== Audio recordings ==
The earliest known audio recordings of Garhwali language were done in the monumental Linguistic Survey of India (LSI) led by George Abraham Grierson, a member of the Indian Civil Service and a linguist. LSI documented more than 300 spoken Indian languages and recorded voices and written forms between 1894 and 1928. Garhwali language was featured in Part IV - 'Pahari Languages & Gujuri' of Volume IX - 'Indo-Aryan Languages, Central Group' published in 1916 by Grierson. Recordings include the Parable of the Prodigal Son and of a well-known folk-tale: the fable of the Bundle of Sticks in Garhwali.

== Sub-languages and dialects ==
Two farmers from Uttarakhand discuss the local agricultural status quo in Jaunpuri, a transition dialect of Garhwali and Jaunsari

Sub-languages and dialects
Name	Region	Remarks
Srinagariya	Srinagar and surrounding areas	Regarded as the standard also the preferred one.
Salani	Malla, Talla & Ganga Salan	Practically the same as Srinagaria but more poetic.
Rathwali (Rathi)	Raath,Devalgarh, parts of Pali	It is the language of the Khasiyas
Lobhya	Lobha Patti, Patti Palla Genwar of Pali	Closely resembles Rathi but very feminine sound
Chandpurya	Chandpur Pargana of Chamoli(In Karanprayag,Gauchar and Narayanbagar block)	This dialect was used during the initial period of the Panwar of Garhwal.
Badhani	Badhan Pargana(Dewal,Tharali,Narayanbagar block of Chamoli).	Spoken in the Badhan Pargana of Chamoli district, with a sweet and feminine sound, and in some of its more remote areas, words similar to those of the Kumaoni language can be heard.
Dasolya	Dasoli Pargana and some part of Kapiri Pargana and Painkhand.	A very vivid dialect of Garhwali, which use gender neutral feminine verbs, this dialect shows a good influence of some ancient language on it, along with a slight influence of Rongpa language and it also have a lot of local variation of verbs and grammar.
Majh Kumaiya	Pindar paar badhan(Himni to Badhan Garhi), Malla Katyur, Talla Danpur	Transitional between Garhwali and Kumaoni. It is also known as Doosanji in Almora
Gangadi	Uttarkashi, Dunda, Chinyalisaur and parts of Bhatwari.	Transitional between Tehriyali and Rawanlti. Close to Tehriyali
Ranwalti	Barkot, Purola and Parts of Mori.	Spoken in Rawain valley of Uttarkashi. Transitional between Mahasu Pahari and Garhwali
Nagpuriya	Rudraprayag and Chamoli Nagpur Pargana, ( Malla and Talla Nagpur)	The most poetic dialect of Garhwali language,very well structured and Masculine sound.
Tehriyali	Chamba, New Tehri, Ghansyali	Mostly spoken dialect of Garhwali and very similar to standard form of Garhwali, Srinagaria
Gangpariya	Lambgaon, Jakhnidhar, Pratapnagar	Spoken in North of Bhagirathi valley of pratapnagar area
Jaunpuri	Nainbag, Kyari, Thatyur, Mussourie, Dhanaulti	Transitional between Tehriyali and Jaunsari
Bhattiani	Surrounding pattis and villages in Tehri belt, Bhatgaon Area	

Interview of Saradi in Garhwali

== Pronouns ==
	Nominative	Oblique	Reflexive	Possessive determiner	Possessive pronoun
1st pers. sing.	मी/मि/मिग	मिखण/मिथै/म्यवूं		म्यारू	म्यारू
2nd pers. sing./pl.	(तु/त्वे ,त्व्वुinf), (थांउ f /तीमी sf)	(तुम्सणी/तुम्थै,inf), (थांऊ f /तुम्सणी/तुम्थै sf)		(त्यारू inf), (तुम्हरु sf /थांउझु f)	(तुम्सणी sf), (तुम्हरो sf /थांउझु f)
3rd pers. sing.	व, वे, ए, सि,	वीँ, वे, ए, से		वीँ, वे, ए, से	वीँ, वे, ए, से
1st pers. pl.	आमि,	आम्सणी/आम्थै		हम्रो	हमारो
3rd pers. pl.	तौंल, श्या, सी	तौं		तौं	तौं

=== Cases ===
	Translation (English)	Standard (Written)	Standard (Spoken : Fluent)	Standard (Spoken–Variant)	Lectal (literary)
Nominative				न, ल	
Vocative	Hey	हो	हो	हो	हो
Accusative	to	सणि, मु	अःण्, उँ	सणि, हणि, थणि, झणि, खणि, अणि, अ:णि, मु, उ, म्	थइँ, थइ, तइ, तै, ते, खइँ, कइँ, कइ, कै, के
Instrumental	by	न	अँ	न, न्, अँ	च, स
Dative I	for	खुणि	क्वँ	खुणि, कुणि, कुइँ, क्विं, क्वँ	कुतइ, कुतै
Dative II	for the sake of	बाना	बाँ	बाना, बान, बान्, बाँ	वास्ता, वात्ता, अत्ता, खातिर, लइ, ले, लिज्या,
Ablative	From	बटि (	बट़्	बटि, बट, बऱि, बऱ्, बट़ि, बट़्	बटिन, बटिग, न, च, चला
Genitive	Of	स्य, स्यु, स्यि, स्या	स्य	ह्य, अ/आ, इ/ई, उ/ऊ, ए/ऐ, ओ/औ	रु, रि, रा, कु, कि, का
Locative	Onto, on, into, in	उन्दु(onto), फुण्डु(on), इन्दु (into), पेटु (in)	उँ, पुँ, इँ, प्य्ट़्	उन्दु, उन्द, उन्, उँ, फुण्डु, फुण्ड, फुण्, फुन्, पुन्, पुँ, इन्दु, इन्द, इन्, इँ, पेटु, प्याट्, प्य्ट, प्यट़्	N/A

=== Numerals ===
Number	Numeral	Written	IAST
0	०	सुन्ने	sunne
1	१	यऽक	yak
2	२	दुई / द्वी	duī
3	३	तीन	tīn
4	४	चार	cār
5	५	पाँच	pā̃c or pā̃
6	६	छॉ / छै	chŏ
7	७	सात	sāt
8	੮	आठ	āṭh
9	९	नउ / नौ	naü

=== Verb conjugation ===
Conjugation of the verb दॆख्ण (deykhna) "to look", in all three tenses in Garhwali.

==== Present tense ====
	singular	plural
1st person	मि दॆखु mi dykhu I look	हमल द्याख/ हमुन द्याख haml dyākh/ hamun dyakh we look
2nd person	ति दॆखु ti dykhu you look	तिल द्याख/ तुमुन द्याख til dyākh/ tumun dyākh you look
3rd person	सु दॆखु su dykhu He looks	उन द्याख un dyākh they look
3rd person	सॊ दॆखु sw dykhu She looks	उन द्याख un dyākh they look
3rd person	इ दॆखु i dykhu It looks (nu.)	उन द्याख un dyākh they look
3rd person	सि दॆखु si dykhu It looks (masc.)	उन द्याख un dyākh they look
3rd person	सॆ दॆखु sy dykhu It looks (fem.)	उन द्याख un dyākh they look

==== Past tense ====
	singular	plural
1st person	मि दॆखि mi dëkhi I looked	आमील लटोलि āmīl laṭoli we wrote
2nd person	ति दॆखि ti dëkhi You looked	तीमील लटोलि tīmīl laṭoli you wrote
3rd person	तॊ दॆखि tö dëkhi He/She looked	तौंल लटोलि tãũl laṭoli they wrote
3rd person	तॆ दॆखि të dëkhi It looked (masc. & fem.)	तौंल लटोलि tãũl laṭoli they wrote
3rd person	ऎ दॆखि ë dëkhi This looked	तौंल लटोलि tãũl laṭoli they wrote
3rd person	ऒ दॆखि ö dëkhi That looked	तौंल लटोलि tãũl laṭoli they wrote

==== Future tense ====
	singular	plural
1st person	मी लटोएंछु mī laṭoenchu I will look	आमी लटोएंछौं āmī laṭoenchãũ we will look
2nd person	तु लटोएंछै tu laṭoenchai you will look	तीमी लटोएंछौं tīmī laṭoenchãũ you will look
3rd person	सु लटोएंछन् su laṭoenchan he will look	तौ लटोएंछन् tau laṭoenchan they will look

== Phonology ==
There are many differences from Hindi and other Indic languages, for example in the palatal approximant /j/, or the presence of a retroflex lateral /ɭ/. Garhwali also has different allophones.

=== Vowels ===
==== Monophthongs ====
There are many theories used to explain how many monophthongs are used in the Garhwali language. The Non-Garhwali Indian scholars with some Garhwali scholars (who believe Garhwali is a dialect of Hindi) who follow Common Hindustani phonology argue that there are eight vowels found within the language: ə, ɪ, ʊ, ɑ, i, u, e, o. A Garhwali language scholar Mr. Bhishma Kukreti argues that /ɑ/ is not present in the language instead of it long schwa i.e. /ə:/ is used. Although it can be accepted that southern Garhwali dialects have uses of /ɑ/ instead /ə:/. If we follow his rule of vowel length we found that there are five vowels found in Garhwali. Three are ə, ɪ, ʊ with long forms /ə:/, /ɪ:/, /ʊ:/. The other two are /o/ & /e/ with no vowel length. But there are thirteen vowels founded by Mr. Anoop Chandra Chandola as follows /ə/, /ɪ/, /ʊ/, /ɑ/, /i/, /y/, /u/, /e/, /o/, /æ/, /ɨ/, /ɔ/, /ɯ//. His arguments can be accepted as universal (also /ɑ/ which is used only in Southern dialects but borrowed to Standard dialect for distinction purposes) . But Bhishma Kukreti's argument about vowel length is also accepted. Hence we concluded that Garhwali (Standard Garhwali in this mean) has thirteen vowels (/ə/, /ɪ/, /ʊ/, /ɑ/, /i/, /y/, /u/, /e/, /o/, /æ/, /ɨ/, /ɔ/, /ɯ/) where three has vowel length (/ə:/, /ɪ:/, /ʊ:/).

The newer studies (by Gadwall's Kukareithi) reveals a slightly different but easier classification of Gaddish vowels. He writes, "There is no doubt that Gaddish is developed in a very complex and crucial way. It (Gaddish) has taken a lot of elements of all the Indo-European languages. [...] As it comes to vowels, Gaddish has variety of vowels & allo-vowels as well. But my classification of Gaddish vowels is need of time for making Gaddish a standard one."

Gaddish is only language having voiceless vowels. Kukareithi orders Gaddish vowelic alphabets as: a, i, e, u, o.

- Most of the time all vowels when coming at the beginning of the word are pronounced voiceless. This is a characteristic of Vadic lects retained in Standard Gaddish and its western dialects. But developed into a:, i:, u: (voiced) in Standard Sanskrit. In Gaddish, y is voiceless counterpart of "i & e" & w is counterpart of "u & o". ** Although few dialects has no such behaviour regarding gone voiceless when the vowel comes at the beginning. It can happen at any position of vowel.
- When it comes to long pronunciation of vowels they again behave like Vadic vowels did. Vowel 'a' pronounced "a:", vowel 'i' as "i:", vowel 'u' as "u:", vowel 'e' as "ay" & vowel 'o' as "aw".
- When the vowels used at any point except beginning or end, pronounced as usual i.e. short sounded. It means 'a' as अ, 'i' as, 'u' as, 'e' as, 'o' as.

Monophthongs of Garhwali
	Front		Central	Back	
short	long	short	long	Back	
Close	ɪ, ʏ	iː, yː	ɨ	ɯ, ʊ	uː
Close-mid		eː	ə		oː
Open-mid		æː			ɔː
Open			aː		

==== Diphthongs ====
There are diphthongs in the language which makes the words distinctive than other. However diphthongs vary dialect by dialect.

Diphthongs (IPA)	Example (IPA)	Glos
उइ /ui/	कुइ /kui/	anybody
इउ /iu/	जिउ /ʤiu/	Heart, mind
आइ /ai/	बकाइ /bəkɑi/	After-all, besides
अइ /əi/	बकइ /bəkəi/	Balance
आउ /au/	बचाउ /bəʧau/	Save (verb)
अउ /əu/	बचउ /bəʧəu/	Safety

Triphthongs are less commonly found in the language. The most common word where a triphthong may occur is ह्वाउन [English: may be] /hɯɔʊn/ (in standard Garhwali) or /hɯaʊn/ (in some dialects). However many speakers can't realize the presence of triphthongs. Other triphthongs might be discovered if more academic research were done on the language.

=== Consonants ===
		Bilabial	Dental	Alveolar	Retroflex	Post-alv./ Palatal	Velar	Glottal
Nasal		m	n		ɳ		ŋ	
Stop/ Affricate	plain	p⠀b	t⠀d		ʈ⠀ɖ	tʃ⠀dʒ	k⠀ɡ	
Stop/ Affricate	aspirated	pʰ bʱ	tʰ dʱ		ʈʰ ɖʱ	tʃʰ dʒʱ	kʰ ɡʱ	
Fricative				s				h
Approximant		w	l		ɭ	j		
Trill			r		ɽ			

==== Tenuis consonants ====
GPA (Garhwali Phonetic Alphabet) /IPA /	Phoneme /IPA alternate/	Phonemic category	Example / (IPA alternate) / (Description)	Hindustani language alternate of the word
क /kə/	क् /k/	voiceless velar stop	कळ्यो /kaɭyo/ (Literary meaning: Breakfast)	नाश्ता, कलेवा
ग /gə/	ग् /g/	voiced velar stop	गरु /gərʊ/ (Literary meaning: Heavy weight)	भारी
च /tʃə/	च् /tʃ/	voiceless palato-alveolar affricate	चिटु /tʃiʈɔ/ (Literary meaning: White; masculine)	सफ़ेद, श्वेत
ज /ʤə/	ज् /dʒ/	voiced palato-alveolar affricate	ज्वनि /dʒɯni/ (Literary meaning: Youth)	जवानी, यौवन
ट /ʈə/	ट् /ʈ/	voiceless retroflex stop	टिपुण् /ʈɨpɯɳ/ (Literary meaning: to pick; a verb)	चुगना, उठाना
ड /ɖə/	ड् /ɖ/	voiced retroflex stop	डाळु /ɖɔɭʊ/ (standard) or /ɖaɭʊ/ (in some southern dialects), (Literary meaning: Tree)	डाल, पेड़, वृक्ष
त /tə/	त् /t/	voiceless dental stop	तिमुळ /tɨmɯɭ/ (Literary meaning: Moraceae or Fig; a fruit)	अञ्जीर/अंजीर
द /də/	द् /d/	voiced dental stop	देस /deç/ (Literary meaning: Foreign) [don't be confused with देस /des/; meaning "country" borrowed from Hindustani]	विदेश, परदेस, बाहरला-देस
प /pə/	प् /p/	voiceless bilabial stop	पुङ्गुड़ु /pʊŋuɽ, (Literary Meaning: Farm or Field)	खेत or कृषि-भुमि
ब /bə/	ब् /b/	voiced bilabial stop	बाच /batʃə, (Literary Meaning: Tongue, Phrasal & other meaning: Voice)	जीभ, जुबान, आवाज़
ल /lə/	ल् /l/	dental lateral approximant	लाटु /lʌʈɔ/ (Literary meaning: idiot or mad or psycho; when used in anger. insane; when used in pity or love)	झल्ला, पागल
ळ /ɭə/	ळ् /ɭ/	retroflex lateral approximant	गढ़वाळ् /gəɖwɔɭ/ (Literary meaning: One who holds forts, Generally used for the land of Garhwallis People, or Garhwal)	गढ़वाल
य /jə/	य् /j/	palatal approximant	dagdaiya /jar/ (Literary meaning: Friend, commonly used as vocative word)	यार
व /wə/	व् /w/	labio-velar approximant	बिस्वास /biswɔs/ (Literary meaning: Faith)	विश्वास, भरोसा
म /mə/	म् /m/	bilabial nasal	मुसु /mʊs/ (Literary meaning: Mouse)	मूषक, चुहा
न /nə/	न् /n/	dental nasal	निकम् /nɨkəm/ (Literary meaning: Useless, Worthless)	बेकार, व्यर्थ
ण /ɳə/	ण् /ɳ/	retroflex nasal	पाणि /pæɳ/ (Literary meaning: Water)	पानी
ङ /ŋə/	ङ् /ŋ/	velar nasal	सोङ्ग or स्वाङ्ग /sɔɳ/ (Literary meaning: Easy)	सरल, आसान
ञ /ɲə/	ञ् /ɲ/	palatal nasal	फञ्चु /pʰəɲtʃɔ/ (Literary meaning: Bundle or Bunch)	पोटली

==== Aspirated consonants ====
य्, र्, ल्, ळ्, व्, स् and the nasal consonants (ङ्, ञ्, ण्, न्, म्) have no aspirated consonantal sound.

Alphabet /IPA alternate/	Phoneme /IPA alternate/	Example /IPA alternate/ (Description)	Hindustani language alternate of the word
ख /kʰə/	ख् /kʰ/	खार्यु /kʰɔryʊ/ (Literary meaning: Enough, Sufficient)	नीरा, पर्याप्त, खासा
घ /gʰə/	घ् /gʱ/	घंघतौळ /gʱɔŋgtoɭə/ (Literary meaning: Confusion)	दुविधा
छ /tʃʰə/	छ् /tʃʰ/	छज्जा /tʃʰəʤə/ (Literary meaning: Balcony, Gallery)	ओलती, छज्जा
झ /dʒʰə/	झ् /dʒʱ/	झसक्याण /dʒʱəskæɳ/ (Literary meaning: to be scared)	डर जाना
थ /tʰə/	थ् /tʰ/	थुँथुरु /tʰɯ~tʊr/ (Literary meaning: Chin)	ठोड़ी
ध /dʰə/	ध् /dʱ/	धागु /dʱɔgʊ/ (Literary meaning: Tag or thread)	धागा
ठ /ʈʰə/	ठ् /ʈʰ/	ठुङ्गार /ʈʰɯɳʌr/ (Literary meaning: Snacks)	स्नैक्स्, नमकीन
ढ /ɖʰə/	ढ् /ɖʱ/	ढिकणु /ɖʱikəɳʊ/ (Literary meaning: Coverlet)	ओढने की चादर
फ /pʰə/	फ् /pʰ/	फुकाण /pʰʊkaɳ/ (Literary meaning: Destruction)	नाश
भ /bʰə/	भ् /bʱ/	भौळ or भ्वळ /bʱɔɭə/ (Literary meaning: Tomorrow)	कल (आने वाला)

=== Allophony ===
The Garhwali speakers are most familiar with allophones in the Garhwali language. For example, फ (IPA /pʰ/) is used as फ in the word फूळ (IPA /pʰu:ɭ/ English: flower) but pronounced as प (IPA /p/) in the word सफेद (IPA /səpet/, English: "white").

==== Allophones of aspirated consonants ====
===== Conversion to tenuis consonant or loss of aspiration =====
Almost every aspirated consonant exhibits allophonic variation. Each aspirated consonant can be converted into the corresponding tenuis consonant. This can be called loss of aspiration.

Alphabet /IPA/	Phoneme /IPA/	Allophone /IPA/	Example /IPA/ (Description)	Hindustani language alternate of the word
ख /kʰə/	ख् /kʰ/	क् [k]	उखरेण [ukreɳ] (Literary meaning: pass away or die)	गुजर जाना
घ /gʰə/	घ् /gʱ/	ग् [g]	उघड़ण [ugəɽɳ] (Literary meaning: to open or to release)	खोलना, विमोचन
थ /tʰə/	थ् /tʰ/	त् [t]	थुँथुरु [tʰɯ~tʊr] (Literary meaning: Chin)	ठोड़ी
फ /pʰə/	फ् /pʰ/	प् [p]	उफरण [upə:ɳ] (Literary meaning: to unbind or to undo or to unlace)	खोलना, विमोचन (बंधी हुइ चीज़ को खोलना)

===== Allophone of छ =====
Alphabet /IPA alternate/	Phoneme /IPA alternate/	Allophone	Example /IPA alternate/ (Description)	Hindustani language alternate of the word
छ /tʃʰə/	छ् /tʃʰ/	स़् [ç]	छन्नी [çəːni] (Literary meaning: Shed; but used specially for cattle-shed, some southern dialects sometime use छ as a pure phonem so words like छन्नी pronounced as छन्नी or as स़न्नी)	छावनी,पशु-शाला
छ /tʃʰə/	छ् /tʃʰ/	च़् [c]	छ्वाड़ [cɔɽ] (Literary meaning: Bank, Side)	छोर, किनारा

==== Allophones of tenuis consonants ====
===== Conversion from voiced to voiceless consonant =====
A few of the tenuis consonants have allophonic variation. In some cases, a voiced consonant can be converted into the corresponding voiceless consonant.

Alphabet /IPA alternate/	Phoneme /IPA alternate/	Allophone	Phonemic category of allophone	Example /IPA alternate/ (Description)	Hindustani language alternate of the word
ग /gə/	ग् /g/	क् [k]	voiceless velar stop	कथुग [kətuk] (Literary meaning: How much)	कितना
द /də/	द् /d/	त् [t]	voiceless dental stop	सफेद [səpet] (Literary meaning: White)	सफेद
ड् /ɖə/	ड् /ɖ/	ट् [ʈ]	voiceless retroflex stop	परचण्ड [pərətʃəɳʈ] (Literary meaning: fierce)	प्रचण्ड
ब /bə/	ब् /b/	प् [p]	voiceless bilabial stop	खराब [kʰərap] (Literary meaning: Defective)	खराब

==== Other allophones ====
Alphabet /IPA alternate/	Phoneme /IPA alternate/	Allophone	Phonemic category of allophone	Example /IPA alternate/ (Description)	Hindustani language alternate of the word
ज /ʤə/	ज् /ʤ/	य़् [j]	palatal approximant	जुग्गा [jɯggə] (Literary meaning: Able)	योग्य, क़ाबिल
स /sə/	स् /s/	स़् [ç]	voiceless palatal fricative	(a) सि [çɨ] (Literary meaning: This), (b) देस /deç/ (Literary meaning: Foreign)	(a) यह (b)बाहरला-देस, परदेस
च /ʧə/	च् /ʧ/	च़् [c]	voiceless palatal stop	चाप [capə] (Literary meaning: Anger)	कोप, गुस्सा

=== Assimilation ===
Garhwali exhibits deep Assimilation (phonology) features. Garhwali has schwa deletion, as in Hindi, but in other assimilation features it differs from Hindi. An example is the phrase राधेस्याम. When we write this separately, राधे & स्याम (IPA: /rəːdʰe/ & /syəːm/) it retains its original phonetic feature, but when assimilated it sounds like रास्स्याम /rəːssyəːm/ or राद्स़्याम /rəːdçyəːm/.

== Samples ==
Words/phrases	Transliteration	Meaning
ढकुली	ḍhakuli	Hello (lit. praise the lord) Formal.
सेमन्या/ज्द्यो/जिवार	semanya/Jadyo/Jiwar	salutation
कख?/कऽ	kakh?/Kau	Where?
किलै?	kilaiī?	Why?
कन?	kan?	How?
कैक?/के/केगो	kaik?/k/kego	Whose?
कु?	ku?	Who?
व्ह्वैगै	vhwege	Done
कथ्गा?/कति/कत्या	kathga?	How much?
कन च दौं	kan ch daun?	How are you ?
कख जाणा छों?कौख न्हैगो?	kakh jāṇā chāñ?	Where are you going?
कि/क्या व्हैगे?	ki/ kya vhwege?	What happened?
त्यार/त्येरु नौं क्या च?/तूंवऽ नौग क्यगो	tyār nãũ kya ch?	What is your name?
हिटण दे मि थैं/तै।	hitan de mi thai/tyai.	Let me walk.
कख बटिन अयाॅ छां तुम? न्हा क बे पेटा तुम?	kakh baṭin ayā̃ chaañ tum?	From where have you come?

== Problems and issues ==
According to the UNESCO Atlas of World's Languages in Danger, Garhwali is in the category of "vulnerable language".

The reasons for this are manifold. Key amongst them is the lack of patronization at the State and Central government levels. Garhwali is regarded as a 'dialect' or 'mother tongue' as per the Census of Languages and is counted as a dialect of Hindi. It has not received patronage at the State level. History has a role to play as well. Historically, Sanskrit was the language of the Garhwal Kingdom court and Garhwali was the language of the people. During the British Raj and in the period after Independence of India, the Garhwal region was included in the Hindi-speaking state of Uttar Pradesh for decades. Further, Uttar Pradesh government's policy of affirmative action through the law of reservation of jobs for the SCST population in Uttar Pradesh is said to have led to increased migration of Hindi speakers from the plains of Uttar Pradesh to the cities of Garhwal to make up for the low percentage of SCST population in Garhwal. These factors are also said to contribute to increased importance of Hindi and reduced prestige for Garhwali language in the minds of the local population.

Today, Garhwali is not used in the official domain. It is not taught at school or college level. Its usage remains limited to home and local use. Further, migration to other parts of India and the ever-increasing pressure of globalization has led to diminishing importance of Garhwali for the local population. Knowledge of Garhwali is not regarded as a special skill and gathering Hindi and English skills for economic and social progress are viewed as critical.

Out-migration for economic reasons has further relegated the language to 'low prestige' status amongst its speakers. Since the creation of Garhwal army regiments during the British rule, temporary out-migration had been the trend. Over the last century, as most of the economic opportunities tended to concentrate in plain areas, temporary out-migration followed by eventual return-migration was witnessed. Since 2000, the situation has changed substantially with many out-migrating permanently along with families from Garhwal mainly to eke out their livelihoods and better future of their children.

I think of my parents' generation, the 'socially mobile' one which grew up in the urban. They listened to Garhwali all their lives from their parents. But their naturalisation was in Hindi (lingua franca of the north Indian urban, including Dehradun) and then English at school. They speak the language either when someone comes from the village, or as a mock-performative thing (like the kidspeak with dadi). By the time you come to our generation, the traces are almost gone.

— Martand Badoni, Outlook Magazine: Garhwali: My Grandmother Tongue

Successive state governments have not done much to stem the tide. The state does not accord Garhwali the status of state language. Hindi and Sanskrit are the official languages of Uttarakhand. State universities did not have Garhwali language departments until as recently as 2014. Garhwali has not received much attention from the academia, and much of the research on the language has been driven by local linguists. In 2017, the state government announced a proposal to adopt English as the medium of instruction for early-age learners (from Class 1) in 18000 government schools, thus ignoring the key role played by the mother tongue or home language in early learning and subject-based learning.

The economic development experience of Uttarakhand continues to mainly centred in three plain districts of the State, and ten hill districts remain far behind in this increasing prosperity of the State. Due to this lopsided development, the pace of out-migration could not slow down from the hill districts of the Uttarakhand after its formation. The pace of out-migration is so huge that many of the villages in Garhwal are left with a population in single digit.

These are some of the factors contributing to the deteriorating health of Garhwali and the declining number of its speakers. While the UNESCO "vulnerable language" category is by far the healthiest category amongst the categories of endangered languages, it does not take long for a language to gradually head towards the category of 'critically endangered'.

== Struggle for official recognition ==
Since the formation of Uttarakhand in 2000, successive state governments have been slow-footed in promoting and developing the regional languages of Uttarakhand. Like other languages of Uttarakhand, Garhwali, the most spoken language does not have official recognition. In 2010, Hindi was made the official language and Sanskrit the second official language of the Uttarakhand.

Ceding to long-standing demands to make Garhwali the official language of Uttarakhand and to be taught at schools and universities, in 2014 the Uttarakhand state government issued orders to set up departments of Kumaoni and Garhwali languages at Kumaon University and Garhwal University respectively and to introduce Kumaoni and Garhwali language courses at the undergraduate level. In 2016, State Council of Educational Research and Training (SCERT) announced that Garhwali, Kumaoni, Jaunsari and Rang languages would be introduced on pilot basis for students in standard one to 10th in government schools Under the 'Know Your Uttarakhand' project. In July 2019, the Uttarakhand government announced that Garhwali language school books would be introduced in primary schools from classes 1 to 5 in a pilot project in 79 schools in Pauri Garhwal district.

At the national level, there have been constant demands to include Garhwali in the 8th schedule of the Constitution of India so that it could be made one of the Scheduled Language of India. In July 2010, a Member of Parliament from Pauri Garhwal, Satpal Maharaj brought a private member's bill in the Lok Sabha to include Garhwali and Kumaoni languages in the Eighth Schedule of the Constitution. As is the case with most private member's bills, this bill was not discussed in parliament and has since lapsed.

== Organisations ==
There have been small movements to preserve and develop Garhwali language and culture but primarily, these have been restricted to individuals and communities.

The Akhil Garhwal Sabha, a citizen's group in Dehradun aims to raise awareness amongst young Garhwalis about Garhwali language and culture. From 2012 onwards, it has been organising an annual 2-week Garhwali language workshop in which it provides training in the language and presents the interesting specificities of the language to the learners in Dehradun. It has also been the organiser of a series of 7 days cultural programmes called Kautig Uttarakhand Mahotsava from 1998 onwards to promote traditional folk dances and traditions of Uttarakhand. It publishes a monthly Garhwali newspaper called Rant Raibar. On the initiative of the Akhil Garhwal Sabha, the Uttarakhand state department of culture published a comprehensive dictionary of the Garhwali language which has Hindi and English meanings of the Garhwali words. A team of authors led by eminent Garhwali scholars Achalanand Jakhmola and BP Nautiyal sourced Garhwali words spoken in all areas of Garhwal and compiled them in a most comprehensive lexicon of the language.

Winsar Publishing Company is an organisation that has dedicated a large part of its publications to Garhwali language and literature.

The first Garhwali language app called 'Chakhul Garhwali Dictionary' that lists Garhwali words as well as information on Garhwali culture, traditions and heritage was launched in 2015. A community driven encyclopedia called Garhpedia was launched in 2025 to preserve and promote the fading language.

In 2017, the Delhi state government announced its intention to create 12 regional language academies under the government's Art, Culture and Languages Department including an academy for Garhwali language. In 2018, the Uttarakhand state government announced plans to launch a State Cultural Centre as a hub of all cultural activities in Dehradun which would have an auditorium, six art galleries, a library, a museum, an amphitheatre and a place for symposiums and seminars to promote Uttarakhand's traditional 'Pahari' language and culture.

== Literature ==
Modern day Garhwali has rich literature in all genres including poetry, novels, short stories and plays. Earlier, Garhwali language was present only as folklore. It had practically no literature. Though according to Saklani, a regular literary activity throughout the known history of Garhwal has been reported with most of such efforts related to the orthodox themes of religious matters, poetics, astronomy, astrology, and ayurveda, etc. Most of these works were the copies of the ancient texts, however, few original works related to history, poetry, religion, and architecture are also said to exist. It was only in the 20th century, due to the influence of English language, modern literary forms and themes were adopted. This literature was written both in Hindi and Garhwali.

The oldest manuscript in Garhwali that has been found is a poem named "Ranch Judya Judige Ghimsaan Ji" written by Pt. Jayadev Bahuguna (16th century). In 1828 AD, Maharaja Sudarshan Shah wrote "Sabhaasaar". In 1830 AD, American missionaries published the New Testament in Garhwali. The Gospel of St. Matthew in Garhwali was printed at Lucknow in the year 1876. Pandit Gobind Prasad Ghildyal, B.A. translated the first part of the Hindi Rajniti into Garhwali, and this was printed at Almora in 1901. Several specimens of Garhwali were also found in Pandit Ganga Datt Upreti's 'Hill Dialects of the Kumaon Division'. Pandit Ganga Datt Upreti also collected and published 'Proverbs & folklore of Kumaun and Garhwal' in 1894. The principal forms of Garhiwali Grammar were first published in Dr. Kellogg's Hindi Grammar (2nd edition, London, 1893). The first and comprehensive research work about the Garhwali language, its various dialects, where is it spoken, number of speakers, grammar, vocabulary, phrases and specimens was done in Part IV - Volume IX of the Linguistics Survey of India.

The five local Hindi newspapers of Garhwal of the early 20th century helped to bring about cultural and political awakening in Garhwal. The early writers keen to project and nurture the cultural heritage of Garhwal. These papers were conscious of the cultural-exclusiveness of the region and nurtured the feeling for 'Garhwal nationalism'. Atma Ram Gairola wrote in a poem that Garhwalis of both the parts (State and British) are extremely proud of the fact that 'we are Garhwalis'. Writers like Chandra Mohan Raturi and Tara Dutt Gairola asked the young writers to write only in the 'Garhwali' language, because one could write more sweetly, poignantly and judiciously in one's own mother tongue. These poets and writers brought renaissance in the Garhwali literature. Collections of various oral-folk-literary traditions, like ancient folk songs, Mangal, Bhadiyali, Panwara etc. were also made available during this period.

Some of the famous writers of Garhwal of that era were Sudarsan Shah, Kumudanand Bahuguna, Hari Dutt Sharma (Nautiyal), Hari Krishna Daurgadutti Rudola, Urvi Dutt Shastri, Bal Krishna Bhatt, Mahidhar Dangwal, etc. Few writers writing in Garhwali were Chandra Mohan Raturi, Satyasaran Raturi, Atma Ram Gairola, Sanatananand Saklani, Devendra Dutt Raturi, Suradutt Saklani, etc. Some of the historians were Mola Ram, Miya Prem Singh, Hari Dutt Shastri, Hari Krishna Raturi, Vijaya Ram Raturi.

=== Contemporary literature ===
Garhwali literature has been flourishing despite government negligence. Today, newspapers like "Uttarakhand Khabarsar" and "Rant Raibaar" are published entirely in Garhwali. Magazines like "Baduli", "Hilaans", "Chitthi-patri" and "Dhaad" contribute to the development of the Garhwali language.

In 2010, the Sahitya Akademi conferred Bhasha Samman on two Garhwali writers: Sudama Prasad 'Premi' and Premlal Bhatt. The Sahitya Akademi also organized "Garhwali Bhasha Sammelan" (Garhwali Language Convention) at Pauri Garhwal in June 2010. Many Garhwali Kavi Sammelan (poetry readings) are organized in different parts of Uttarakhand and, in Delhi and Mumbai.

=== Notable writers ===
- Abodh Bandhu Bahuguna – (1927–2004) Known for his contribution to modern Garhwali writing including plays, poems, and essays. Some writings include Gaad, Myateki Ganga, and Bhumyal.
- Atmaram Gairola
- Ravindra Dutt Chamoli
- Bachan Singh Negi – "Garhwali translation of Mahabharata and Ramayana"
- Baldev Prasad Din (Shukla) "Bata Godai kya tyru nau cha" (Garhwali Nirtya-natika)
- Beena Benjwal – "Kamedaa Aakhar"
- Bhagbati Prasad Panthri – "Adah Patan" and "Paanch Phool"
- Bhajan Singh 'Singh' – "Singnaad"
- Bhawanidutt Thapliyal – "Pralhad"
- Bholadutt Devrani – "Malethaki Kool"
- Bijendra Prasad Naithani "Bala Sundari Darshan", "Kot Gaon Naithani Vanshawali", "Ristaun ki Ahmiyat", "Chithi-Patri-Collection"
- Chakradhar Bahuguna – "Mochhang"
- Chandramohan Raturi – "Phyunli"
- Chinmay Sayar – "Aunar"
- Dr. Narendra Gauniyal – "Dheet"
- Dr. Shivanand Nautiyal
- Durga Prasad Ghildiyal – "Bwari", "Mwari" and "Gaari"
- Harish Juyal 'Kutaj' – "Khigtaat"
- Govind Chatak – "Kya Gori Kya Saunli"
- Harsh Parvatiya – "Gainika nau par"
- Jayakrishna Daurgadati – "Vedant Sandesh"
- Jayanand Khugsaal – "Jhalmatu dada"
- Kanhaiyyalal Dandriyal (Kavi/Poet) – "Anjwaal", "Mangtu", "Nagraja" (in 2 parts)
- Keshavanand Kainthola – "Chaunphal Ramayan"
- Lalit Keshwan – "Khilda Phool Hainsda Paat", "Hari Hindwaan"
- Lalit Mohan Thapalyal – "Achhryun ku taal"
- Leeladhar Jagudi – (1944) Writer and novelist. PadmaShri
- Lokesh Nawani – "Phanchi"
- Madan Mohan Duklaan – "Aandi-jaandi saans"
- Mahaveer Prasad Gairola – "Parbati"
- Pratap Shikhar – "Kuredi phategi"
- Premlal Bhatt – "Umaal"
- Purushottam Dobhal
- Sadanand Kukreti
- Satyasharan Raturi – "Utha Garhwalyun!"
- Shreedhar Jamloki – "Garh-durdasa"
- Sudaama Prasad Premi – "Agyaal"
- Sulochana Parmar
- Taradutt Gairola – (1875– 1940) Known for his contribution to the folk-lore of Garhwal and for writing modern Garhwali poetry including 'Sadei' (सदेई).
- Virendra Panwar – "Inma kankwei aan basant(Poetry-2004)

"Been(critic-2012)Chween-Bath(interviews-2013) Geet Gaun Ka(Geet-2014) kathga khauri haur(Translation of Hindi story Dr Ramesh Pokhriyal Nishank to Garhwali-2014) Byunt-Vichar(Garhwali Articles-2021)

- Vishalmani Naithani "Chakrachal", "Kauthik", "Beti Buwari", "Pyunli Jwan Hwegi", "Matho Singh Bhandari Nirtya Natika", "Meri ganga holi ta mai ma bauri aali", "Jeetu Bagdwal", etc. scripts writer.
- Narendra Kathait has also enriched Garhwali language by writing world class literature in Garhwali language. The literature written by him is as follows.
  - Poetry Collection – "Tabari Ar Abari", "Tup-Tap", "Pani"
  - Satire Collection – "Kulla Pichkari", "Lagyan Chhaan", "Ados-Pados", "Hari Singho Baggi Fast", "Aar-Parai Ladai", "Samsya Khadi Cha", "Naaraz Ni Huyaan", "Bakki Tumari Marji"
  - Drama: "Dr. Asaram", "Panch Parani Pachis Chhawin"

== Usage ==
=== In media ===
Garhwali folk singers like Narendra Singh Negi, Preetam Bhartwan, Chander Singh Rahi, Anil Bisht, Kishan Mahipal, Manglesh Dangwal, Santosh Khetwal, Gajendra Rana, Kalpana Chauhan, Anuradha Nirala, Pritam Bhartwan, Rohit Chauhan, Meena Rana, Jeet Singh Negi, Jagdesh Bakrola and many more have renewed interest in the Garhwali language by their popular songs and videos.

Anuj Joshi is one of the prominent Garhwali film directors.

The very first Internet radio of Kumaon/Garhwal/Jaunsar was launched in 2008 by a group of non-resident Uttarakhandi from New York. It was launched to give exposure to Uttarakhand folk music and to bring the melody from the heart of Himalaya to the global screen. Gaining significant popularity among inhabitants and migrants since its beta version was launched in 2010. This was named after a very famous melody of the hills of Himalaya, Bedu Pako Baro Masa.

In the year 2017 Rachit Pokhriyal launched Pineflix to fill in the garhwali language content gap for the people of Uttarakhand, with its first Garhwali Short film releasing on 19 August 2018. Since then they have created films on various topics highlighting hardships of local people of uttarakhand and other social issues for awareness.

== Language preservation and revitalization ==
In late 2025 a community led project (website and app) was launched to save the Garhwali, Kumaoni and Jaunsari languages called HimLingo. More than 4000+ words havw been added to the online Garhwali Dictionary by Garhwali native speakers from around the world.

== See also ==
- Garhwali People
- Garhwal Division
- Kumaoni language
- Garhwal Kingdom
- Northern Indo-Aryan languages
