= Sirmauri language =

Western Pahari language of Northern India

Sirmauri
- सिरमौरी
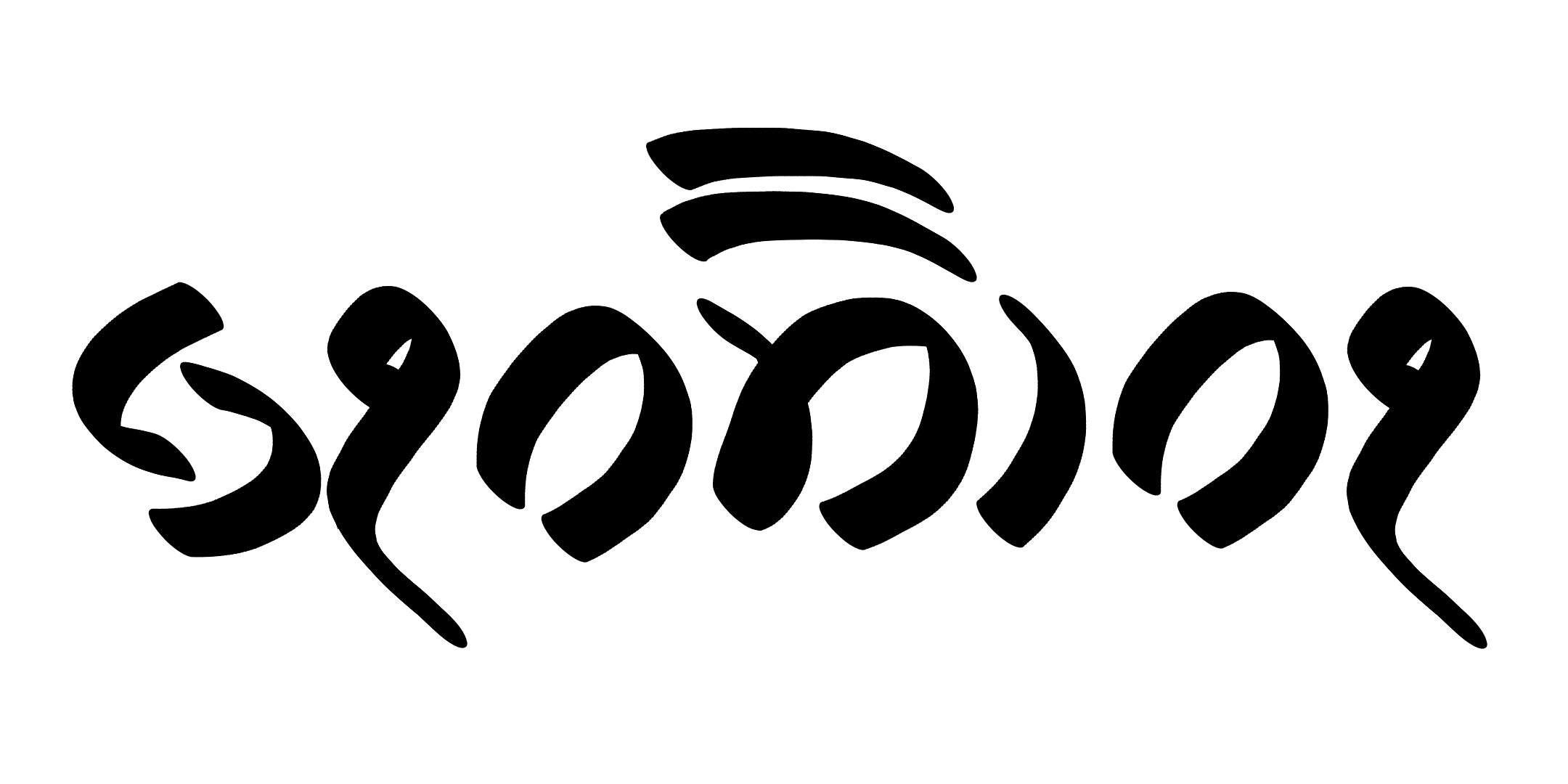
- Sirmauri written in Sirmauri script.
- Native to: Himachal Pradesh; Haryana; Uttarakhand
- Region: Mahasu
- Ethnicity: Sirmauri people
- Native speakers: 107,401 (2011 census)
- Language family: Indo-European: Indo-Iranian; Indo-Aryan; Northern; Western Pahari; Sirmauri
- Dialects: Dharthi; Giripari
- Writing system: Sirmauri script

Language codes
- ISO 639-3: srx
- Glottolog: sirm1239
- ELP: Sirmauri

Sirmauri is a Western Pahari language spoken in the Sirmaur district in the northern Indian state of Himachal Pradesh and in Kalesar area of Yamunanagar district of Haryana and in border areas of Uttarakhand. Its two main varieties are Dharthi (also called Giriwari) and Giripari.

== Phonology ==
=== Consonants ===
		Labial	Dental/ Alveolar	Retroflex	Post-alv./ Palatal	Velar	Glottal
Nasal	voiced	m	n	ɳ		ŋ	
Nasal	breathy	mʱ	nʱ				
Stop/ Affricate	voiceless	p	t	ʈ	tɕ	k	
Stop/ Affricate	aspirated	pʰ	tʰ	ʈʰ	tɕʰ	kʰ	
Stop/ Affricate	voiced	b	d	ɖ	dʑ	ɡ	
Stop/ Affricate	breathy	bʱ	dʱ	ɖʱ	dʑʱ	ɡʱ	
Fricative			s		ɕ		h
Rhotic	voiced		r	ɽ			
Rhotic	breathy			ɽʱ			
Lateral	voiced		l	ɭ			
Lateral	breathy		lʱ				
Approximant		w			j		

=== Vowels ===
	Front	Central	Back
High	iː		uː
High	ɪ		ʊ
Mid	eː	ə	oː
Mid	ɛ	ə	ɔ
Low	(æ)	ɑ ɑː	

== Grammar ==
=== Postpositions ===
Basic postpositions
case	masculine	feminine	neuter
genitive	/ra/	/ree/	/roo/
locative	/da/	/dee/	/doo/
ablative	/sa/	/see/	/soo/

== Script ==
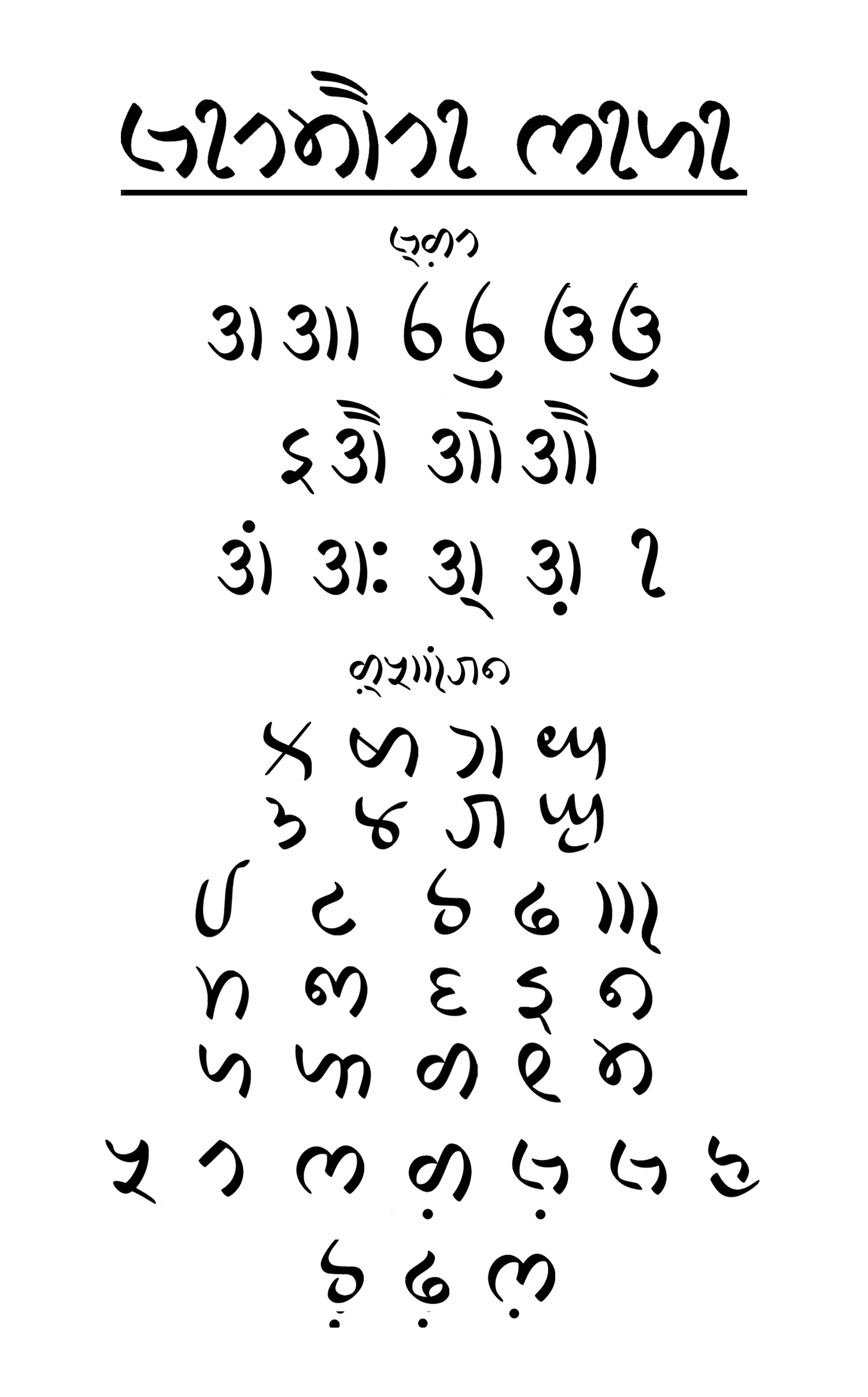
Sirmauri Takri Varnamala chart

The native script of the language is called the Sirmauri script. This script is under proposal to be encoded in Unicode. Pabuchi was a script used by a class of astrologers.

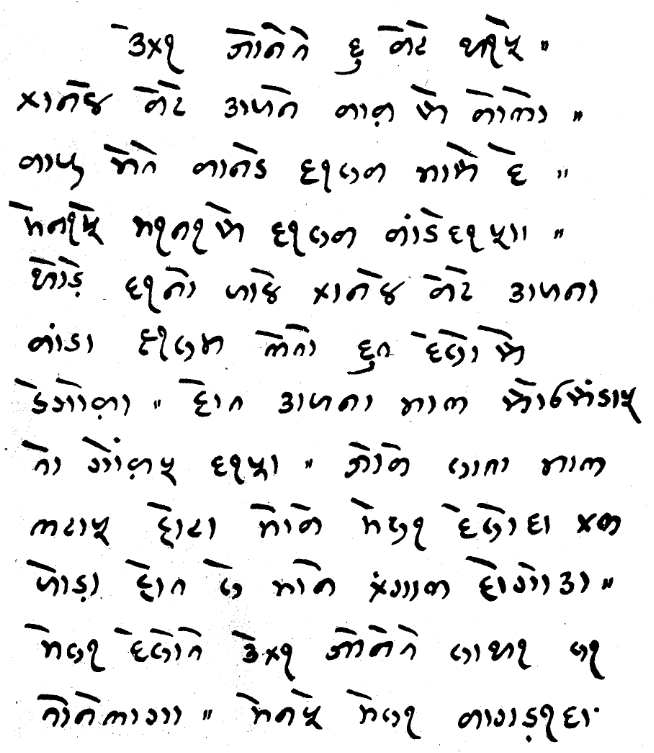
A specimen in Sirmauri Script

== Status ==
The language is commonly called Pahari or Himachali. The language has no official status and is recorded as a dialect of Hindi. According to the United Nations Education, Scientific and Cultural Organisation (UNESCO), the language is in the critically endangered category, i.e. the youngest speakers of Sirmauri are generally grandparents or older and they too speak it infrequently or partially. Earlier the language enjoyed some state patronage, but this ended after independence due to the government favoring Hindi more.

The demand for the inclusion of 'Pahari (Himachali)' under the Eight Schedule of the Constitution, which is supposed to represent multiple Pahari languages of Himachal Pradesh, was made in 2010 by the state's Vidhan Sabha. However, no positive progress on this matter has been made since then. Some small organisations are attempting to save the language.
