= Kumai (disambiguation) =

Kumai may refer to:

- Kumai, subdistrict in Central Kalimantan, Indonesia
- Kumai language, aka Wahgi, a Trans–New Guinea language spoken in the highlands of Papua New Guinea
- Kumai River, river in Central Kalimantan
- Kumai (village), village in the Indian state of Bihar
- Kumai Bahun, better known as Kumaoni people
- Kumai (surname)

== See also ==
- Kumaoni (disambiguation)
