= Kumaoni =

Kumaoni or Kumauni may refer to:

- Kumaoni people, an ethnolinguistic group of Uttarakhand, northern India
- Kumaoni language, the Indo-Aryan language they speak
- anything coming from or related to the following:
  - Kumaon division, an administrative division of the state of Uttarakhand in Northern India
  - Kumaon Kingdom, a former kingdom on this territory

== See also ==
- Kumaoni cuisine
- Kumaoni Holi, a historical and cultural celebration
- Kumaon (disambiguation)
- Kumai (disambiguation)
