= Bal mithai =

Type of Indian chocolate confection

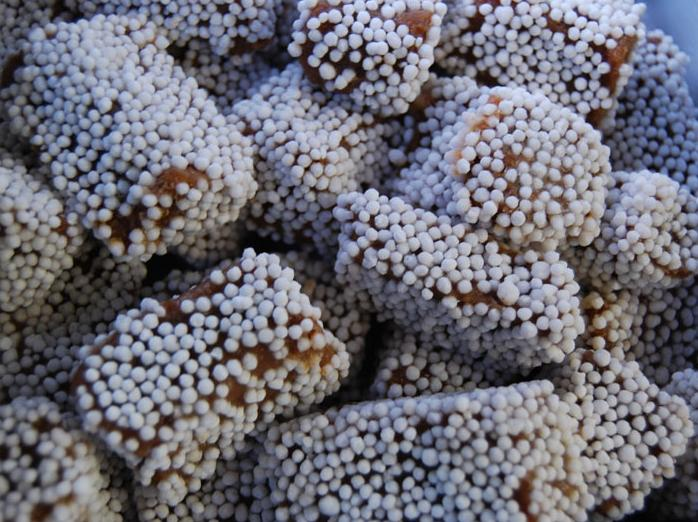
- Bal mithai from Almora, Kumaon, India
- Place of origin: India
- Region or state: Almora, Kumaon, (India)
- Main ingredients: Khoya, cane sugar, caramelised sugar syrup

Bal mithai (Kumaoni: बाल मिठाई, romanized: Bāl Mithai) is a brown chocolate-like fudge, made with roasted khoya and coated with white balls made of sugar coated roasted poppy seeds. It is a popular sweet from Kumaon, India.

== History ==
Bal mithai originated in Kumaon. It was an invention of locals of Lal Bazaar, Almora, in the early twentieth century. Scholars believe that bal mithai initially must have been the name of the prime offering to the Sun God.

Joga Lal Sah, a halwai was in business since 1865 in Lal Bazaar, Almora. He is the one credited for inventing the Bal mithai as it is known today. His shop is still functioning in Almora and is run by his descendants. Bal mithai came to prominence in the early 1900s.

Though the most popular vendor of Bal mithai in Almora is the shop 'Kheem Singh Mohan Singh Rautela'. Kheem Singh Rautela and Mohan Singh Rautela were brothers and workers in the shop of Joga Lal Sah. They opened their own sweets shop near KMOU bus station. Since many bus passengers bought their Bal mithai to get a taste of the popular sweet, their business flourished. Their shop is still running today.

According to local legends, during World War II, Bal mithai was carried by the soldiers from Kumaon fighting in Burma for the British Indian Army. The legend became so popular, that local advertisements boasted, ‘ हमारी शाखा बर्मा में भी ’ (we have branches in Burma too).

== Recipe ==
Bal Mithai is made by cooking khoya (evaporated milk cream) with cane sugar until it becomes dark brown in color, colloquially called 'chocolate' for its color resemblance. This is allowed to settle and cool, and cut into cubes which are then coated with small white balls made of sugar coated roasted poppy seeds.

== Popularity ==
Bal mithai has long been a specialty of the Almora district and neighbouring districts of Kumaon, along with singhauri, another preparation of flavoured khoya that comes wrapped in oak leaves.

== Geographical Indications Protection ==
There has been a recent move to make local sweet makers aware of intellectual property rights, and Geographical Indications Protection (GI Protection) under the Geographical Indications of Goods Act of 1999, which would allow them to gain protection for local specialties such as bal mithai and singhauri, which are symbolic to Kumaon.
