= Kumaon =

Kumaon or Kumaun may refer to:

- Kumaon division, a region in Uttarakhand, India
- Kumaon chieftaincy, a former princely state in Uttarakhand, India
- Kumaon, Iran, a village in Isfahan Province, Iran
- HMIS Kumaon (J164), a ship of the Royal Indian Navy during WWII

== See also ==
- Kumaon Engineering College, former name of Bipin Tripathi Kumaon Institute of Technology in Uttarakhand, India
- Kumaon University, in Nainital, Uttarakhand, India
- Kumaon Regiment, a regiment of the Indian Army
- Kumaon Mastiff, a breed of dog
- Kumaoni (disambiguation)
