= Kalu Singh Mahara =

- Born: Bisung Patti, Champawatl, Kumaon
- Occupations: Soldier; Freedom Fighter

Kalu Singh Mahara was an Indian freedom fighter and Kumaoni leader who rose to prominence during the first Indian Rebellion of 1857. He is regarded as the first major freedom fighter from the state of Uttarakhand (then part of the United Province).

== Early life ==
Kalu Singh Mahara was a Thakur from Bisung Patti, near Lohaghat, in district Champawat.

== The rebellion ==
On receiving a cryptic confidential letter from Oudh, Awadh, inviting him and other followers to join the brewing rebellion against the British. The letter from the government of Awadh proposed that after regaining power from British, the hill area would be given to the pahadi locals whereas Tarai (plain area) below the hills will be governed by Oudh.

Kalu Singh Mahara accepted and began a campaign of local youth named "Krantiveer" which gained wide-spread support in the Kumaon region of Uttarakhand.

Skirmishes across the area of Kali, Sui, Gumdesh and adjoining areas, frustrated the British. His militiamen composed mainly of riflemen Bandukchi ambushed and harassed the British forces on several occasions.

He once commanded a group of young fighters and set fire to the British Barracks in Lohaghat, which caused the British army to retreat. In retaliation to which Commissioner Ramsey sent military contingents from Tanakpur and Lohaghat to ambush the freedom fighters. Kalu Mahara and his men fought fiercely against the British in Bastia, but were forced to retreat.

Mahara was kept in many jails during this time. While, two other revolutionaries Anand Singh Fartyal and Bishan Singh Karayat were shot by the British.

However, in the end the British quashed the rebellion across northern India. But it led Queen Victoria to declare India as no longer a company territory transforming it into what is known as British India. (see Indian Rebellion of 1857)

== Legacy ==
In 2007, Pawan Maati program was organized from his ancestral house.

In 2010, in the presence of the then DM, Lohaghat intersection was named after him.

Kalu Singh Mahara is revered as a hero in Kumaon division of Uttarakhand. In 2009 a statue of this freedom fighter was installed in Dehradun the capital of Uttarakhand.

Recently the Uttarakhand postal department released a new first day cover to honour him

== See also ==
- Indian Rebellion of 1857
- Kumaon(Kumaun)
- Kumaoni(Kumauni) People
