= Kumaoni Holi =

Celebration of the Hindu Holi festival in Kumaon, India

- Observed by: Kumaonis
- Type: Religious, cultural, spring festival
- Celebrations: Night before: Holika Bonfire; On Holi: spray colours on others, dance, party, eating festival delicacies
- Date: per Hindu calendar
- Frequency: Annual

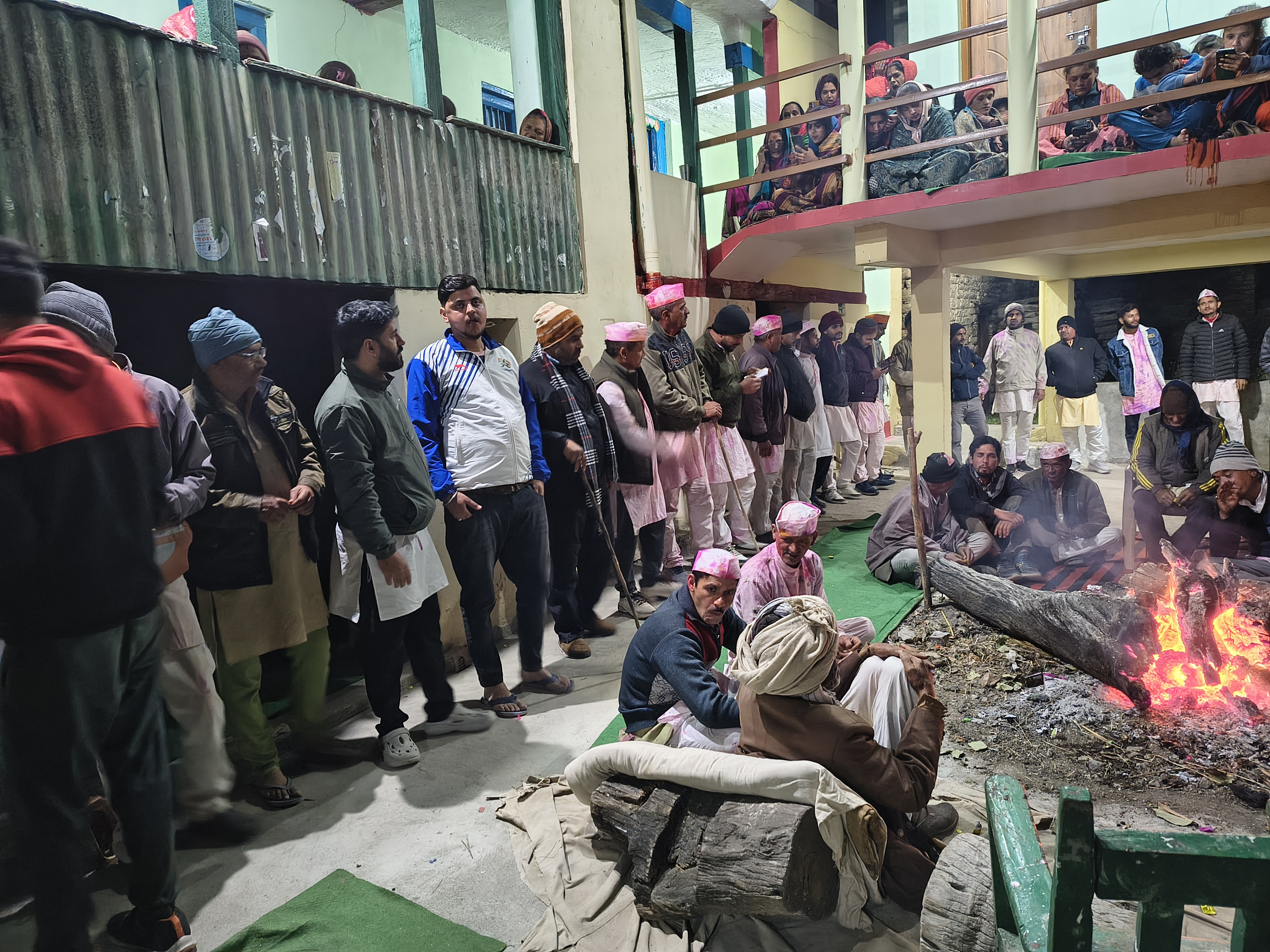
Kumaoni Holi in the village of Harishtal, Nainital

Kumauni or Kumaoni Holi is the historical and cultural celebration of the Hindu festival of Holi in the region of Kumaon, India and Asia It is one of the most important festivals for the Kumauni people as it signifies not only the victory of good over evil but also end of the winter season and the start of the new sowing season which holds great importance for this agricultural community of the North Indian Himalayas. It is an amalgamation of the cultural traditions of North India and the local traditions of Kumaon.

The uniqueness of the Kumaoni Holi lies in its being a musical affair, whatever its form, be it the Baithki Holi, the Khari Holi and the Mahila Holi all of which start from Basant Panchmi. This results in the festivities of Holi lasting for almost two months in Kumaon. The Baithki Holi and Khari Holi are unique in that the songs on which they are based have a combination of melody, fun, and spiritualism. These songs are essentially based on classical ragas. Baithki Holi is also known as Nirvan Ki Holi or Holi of Salvation.

Kumauni Holi has characteristics which are very different from Holi celebrations anywhere in the country.

== Forms of Holi ==
The following are the various forms musical gatherings in which Holi songs are ceremonially sung which are viewed as the start of the Holi celebration. All of these celebrations in the form of musical gatherings start on the Basant Panchmi Day.

=== Origins ===
The Origin of the forms of Holi especially Baithaki Holi musical traditions are in 15th century Champawat (court of the Chand kings) where the musical traditions of Braj mixed with Kumaoni musical traditions of Khadi Holi Of Champawat (Sui, Gumdesh, bilde & bishung) The Ustads which came from the plains (places like Rampur ) made the singing of Holi famous & loved not just among the rulers but also with the common masses, who slowly adopted it and gave it a distinctive Kumauni flavour. A style which is a unique blend of classical music and folk. While, to some it might resemble Thumri because of the presence of Shringar Ras in it but it is totally different, the way the Bandish are rendered, elaborated and the way some of the Raags are presented. With the spread of Chand rule and integration of Kumaon under them the Holi traditions spread all across Kumaon and acquired their distinct Kumaoni flavour. Mr. Heera Ballabh Bhatt ji was the famous Khadi Holi and Baithaki Holi singer in Champawat. He represented Kumaoni Khadi Holi on DD1.

=== Baithaki Holi ===
Baithki Holi (बैठकी होली), (literally Sitting Holi) is a form of musical gathering starting from the day of Basant Panchmi held all across Kumaon till the Dulhendi (or the last full moon day of the lunar month Phalguna). In some areas of Kumaon it starts even earlier at the peak of winter on the first Sunday of the Indian month of Paush that is in the month of December and they celebrates baithaki holi till March (4 months) and during baithaki holi they do not use colours to celebrate.

The Baithaki Holi songs are based on the classical traditions of Hindustani Classical Music but have heavy influence of Kumaoni folk music traditions.

The Baithki Holi begins from the premises of temples, where Holiyars (होल्यार), (the singers of Holi songs) as also the people gather to sing songs to the accompaniment of classical music like harmonium and tabla. Generally starting from the first Sunday of Paush these are known as Nirvana Holi. Some of the holi's written by Swami Brahmanand are also sung and are called Brahmanand ki holi. From Shivratri the focus then Shifts to Shivpadi Holi's.

Most famous Baithaki Holi groups lives in Pati, Champawat district. And there is at least one musical player in all families. They sings their own made baithaki holi songs in regional Kumaoni language or Hindi language.

Kumaonis are very particular about the time when the songs based on ragas should be sung. For instance, at noon the songs based on Pilu, Bhimpalasi and Sarang ragas are sung while evening is reserved for the songs based on the ragas like Kalyan, Shyamkalyan, Kafi, Jaijawanti etc. There is a certain distinctiveness in the presentation of ragas (melodies) too and some of them like Janglakafi (which is a special ang of khamaj) are unique to kumauni holi The Taal's used are also unique. Dhamaar taal in kumauni holi has 16 matra's rather than 14 as in Indian classical music tradition. The other most widely used taal is known as Chanchar which also has 16 matra's. Other than these Teental and keharwa are widely used & at times one may also find Dadra being used but in most common case it is Chanchar -Teental -Keharwa in a Sitarkhani gat. The Baithaks or sittings are held in the local community centres and even at local homes. It generally starts with Rag Dhamaar and ends with Rag Bhairavi.

The songs are usually religious in nature and concern tales from the life of the Hindu God Krishna and Ram . Still these Baithaks are an inter-religious affair as even Muslims and Christians participate in these gatherings.

=== Khadi Holi ===
Khadi Holi (खड़ी होली), (literally Standing Holi) usually starts along with but sometimes a little later than Baithaki Holi. It is mostly celebrated in the rural areas of Kumaon. The songs of the Khari Holi are sung by the people, sporting traditional white nokdaar topi, churidar payajama and kurta, dance in groups to the tune of ethnic musical instruments like the dhol, joda (metal instrument), and Hurka.

Men in groups singing Khadi holi songs which are much more Kumaoni in flavour than the classical renditions of the Baithaki holi visit different homes and greet the members of that house and chant hymns praying for prosperity of the householder. These groups of men are called tolis.

Khadi Holi is filled with excitement and frolic in contrast to the more sombre nature of the Baithaki Holi.

=== Mahila Holi ===
Mahila Holi gatherings are similar to those of Baithaki but composed exclusively of women.

== Rituals ==
=== Cheer Bandhan and Cheer Dahan ===
The Holika bonfire in Kumaun is known as cheer (चीर) which is made in a ceremony known as Cheer Bandhan (चीर बंधन) fifteen days before Dulhendi. The cheer is basically a bonfire with a green paiya tree branch in the middle. The cheer of every village and mohalla is rigorously guarded as rival mohallas try to steal the others' cheer. The cheer is the centre of the festivities.

The Cheer is burnt on the night before Holi and is known as Cheer Dahan is symbolic of the victory of the pious Prahlad over his evil father's plans.

=== Chharadi ===
Dulhendi known as chharadi (छरड़ी), in Kumaoni (from chharad (छरड़), or natural colours made from flower extracts, ash and water) is celebrated with great gusto much in the same way as all across North India. Principal ingredients of the celebration are Abeer and Gulal, in all possible colours. Next comes squirting of coloured water using pichkaris. Coloured water is prepared using Tesu flowers, which are first gathered from the trees, dried in the sun, and then ground up, and later mixed with water to produce orange-yellow coloured water. Another traditional Holi item now rarely seen is a red powder enclosed in globes of Lakh, which break instantly and cover the party with the powder.

=== Shubh Kamna ===
The culmination of the holi celebrations takes place with throwing abeer and gulal in the air and reciting out aloud in unison the following prayer in Kumaoni for a healthy and prosperous year ahead.

हो हो हो लख रे (may you live a hundred thousand years)

हमार आमा बुबू जी रौला सौ लाख बरिस (may our grandparents live for a hundred thousand years)

हमार इजा बौजू जी रौला सौ लाख बरिस (may our parents live for a hundred thousand years)

हमार दाज्यू भौजी जी रौला सौ लाख बरिस (may our brothers and their families live for a hundred thousand years)

हो हो हो लख रे (may you live a hundred thousand years)

== Cuisine ==
Special culinary preparations for Holi include gujia (fried dumpling filled with a sweet filling of roasted Mava(Solid milk extract), and dry fruits and nuts) and Aaloo ke Gutke (आलू के गुटके), which is fried boiled potatoes seasoned with Dhania patta (Coriander leaves) with local spices and Bhaang ki Chutney.

== Significance ==
Apart from its symbolic significance of victory of pious Prahlad over his evil father Hiranyakashipu's plans. In Kumaon holi also signifies the end of the long Himalayan winter and the beginning of a new sowing season which is to be celebrated it also means a break from the rigorous life of hard agricultural labour for a few days for the Kumaoni peasantry.

== See also ==
- Holi
- Kumaon
- Kumaoni people
