= Kumaon division =

Administrative division in Uttarakhand, India

Kumaon division Kumāũ Kurmānchal, Manaskhand
- Administrative Division
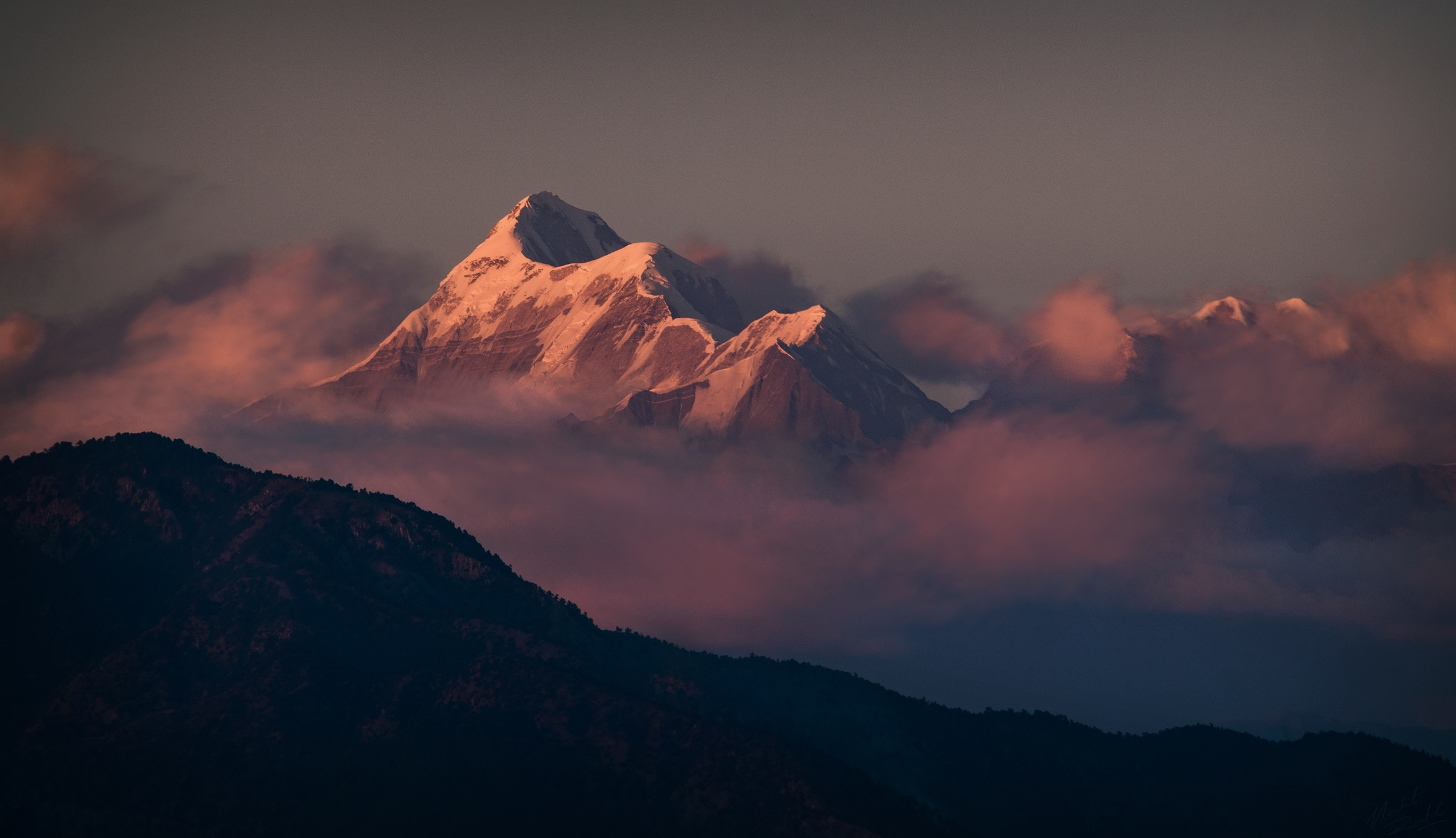
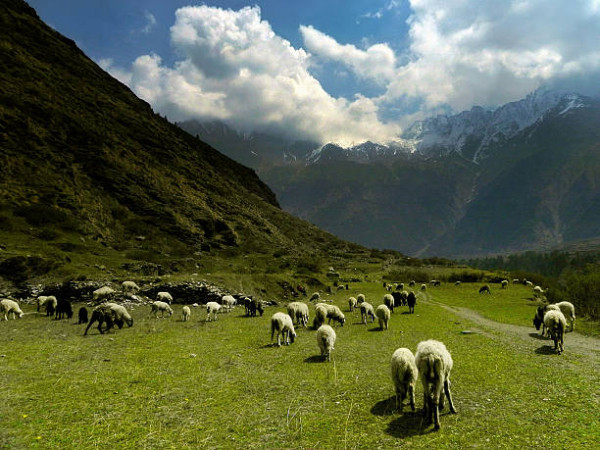
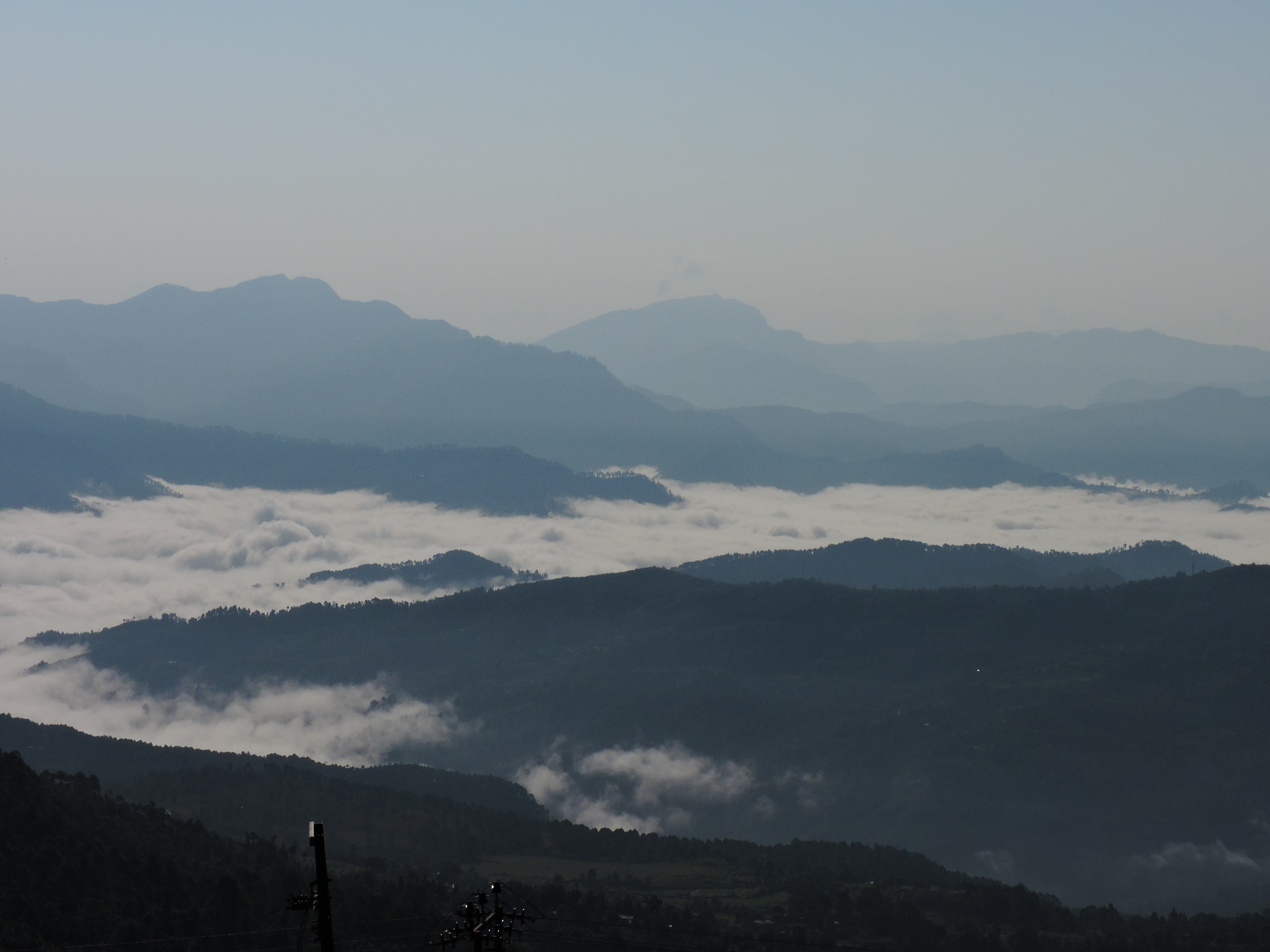
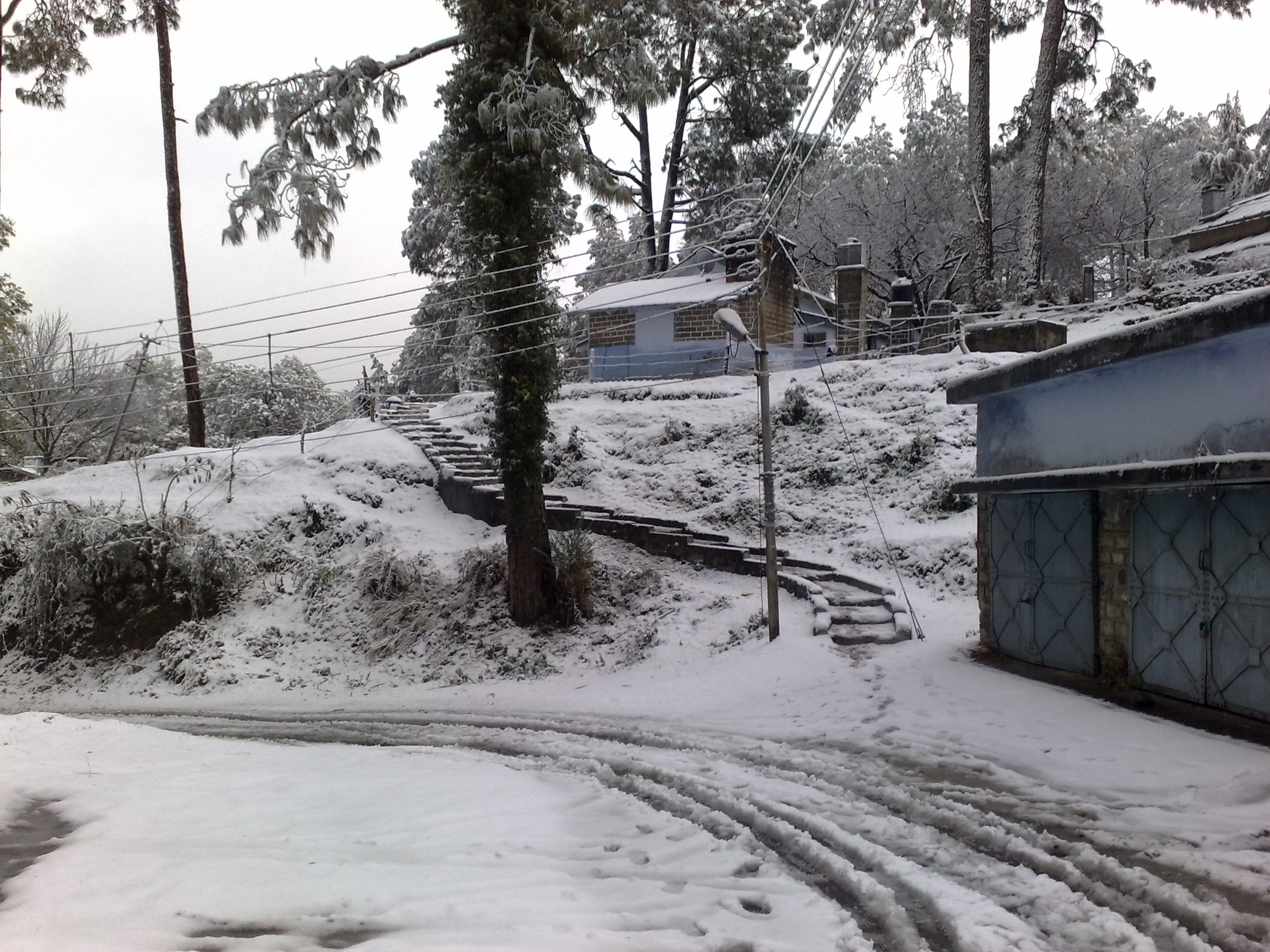
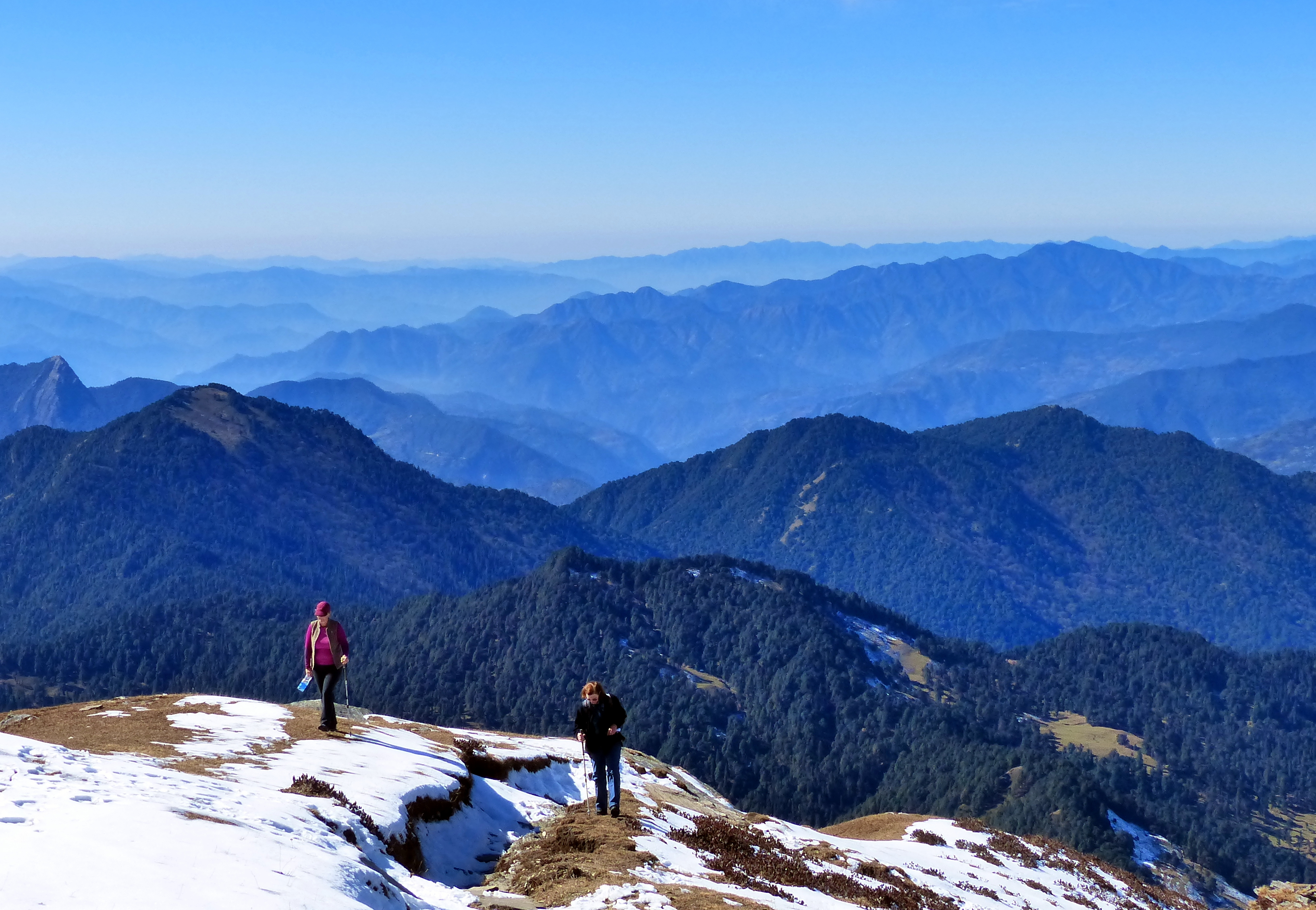
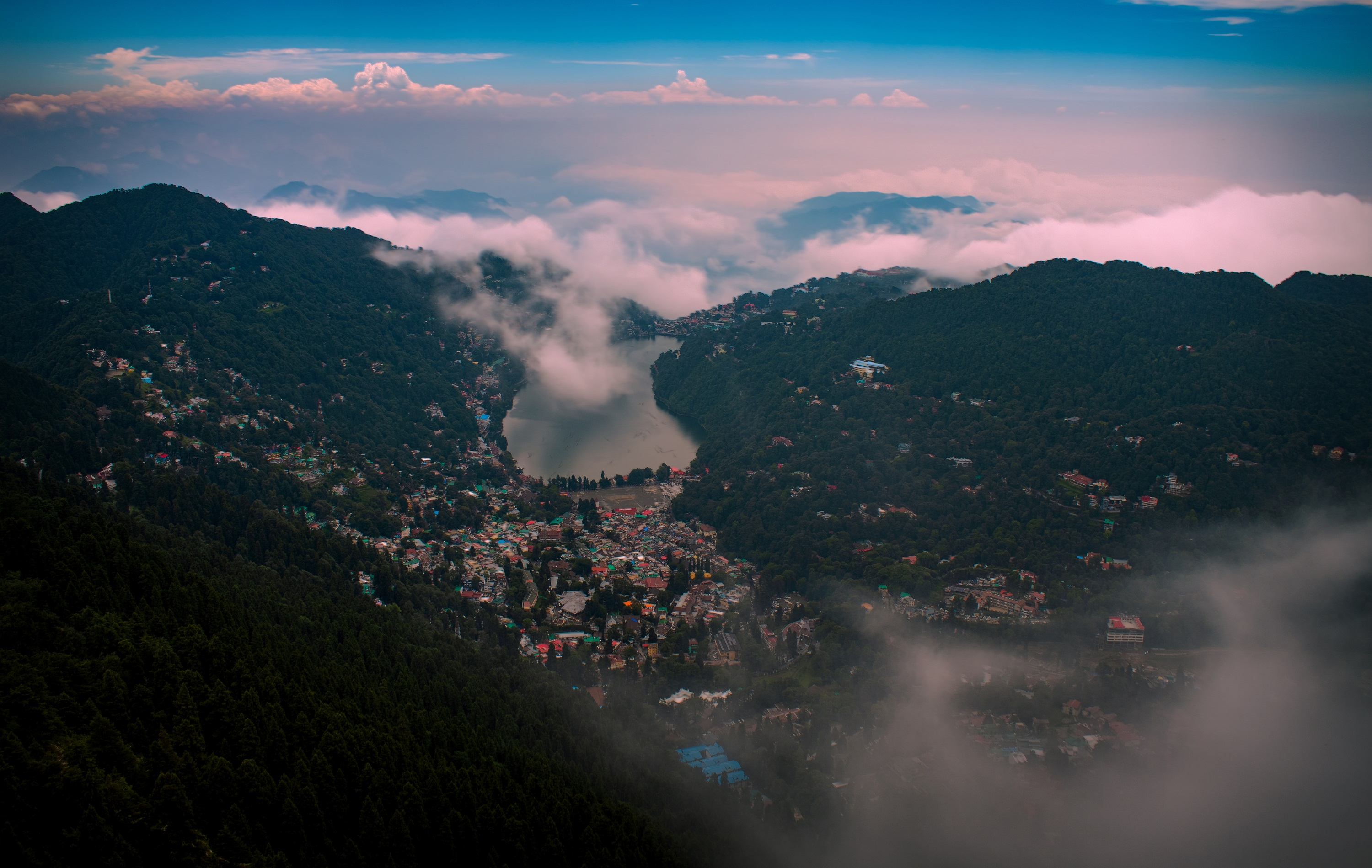
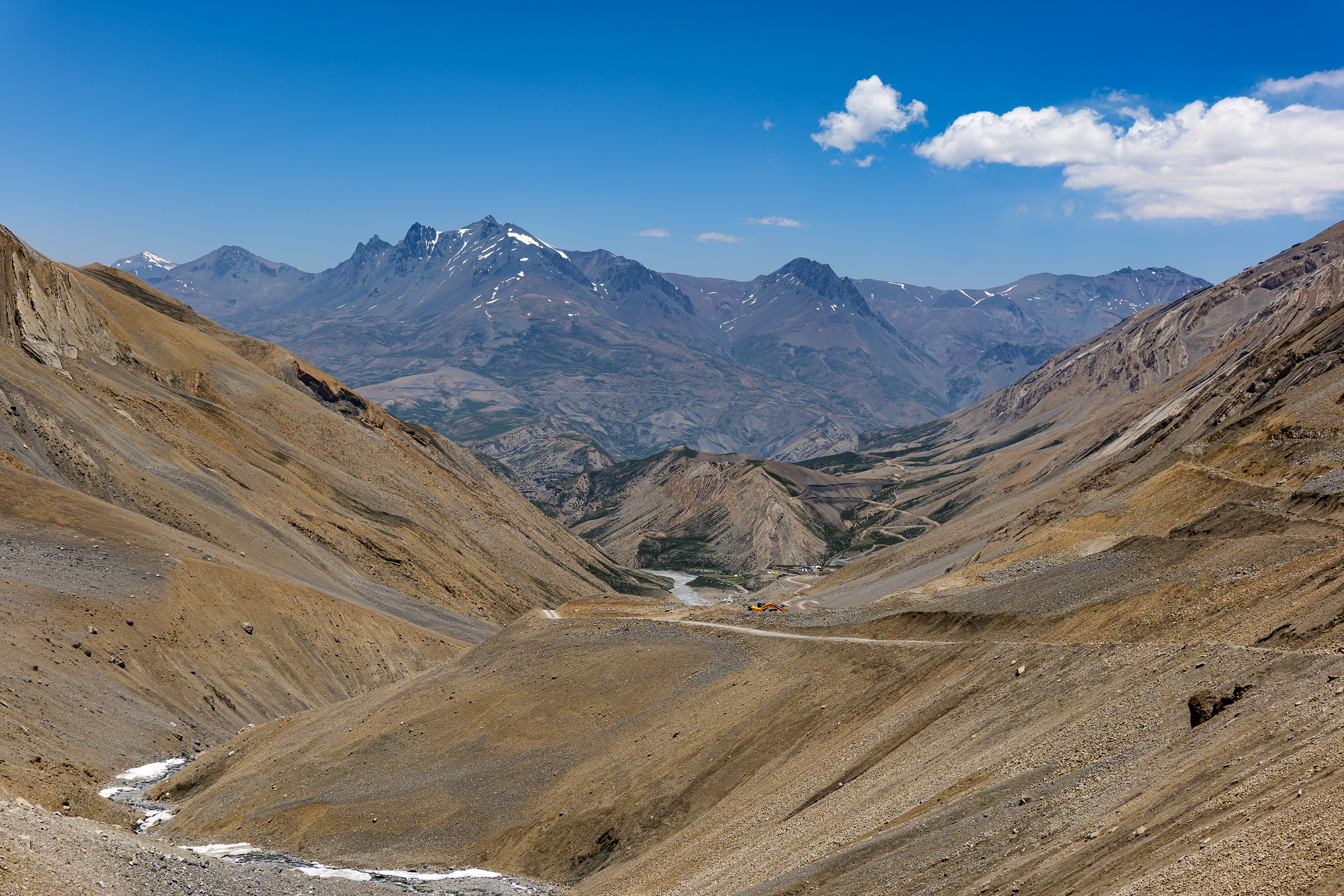
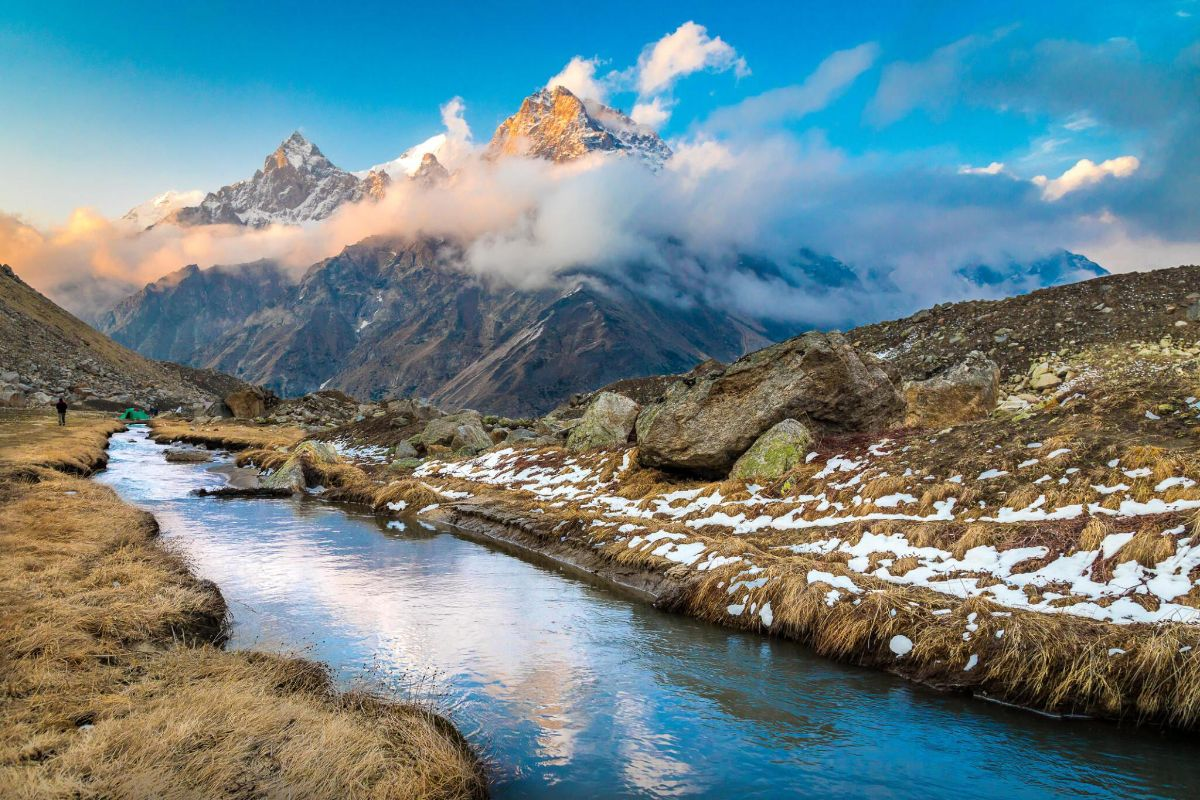
- Clockwise from top: View of Trishul peaks from Ranikhet, Kali river at Jauljibi, View of Purnagiri hills from Tanakpur, Johar Valley, Naini Lake, Jageshwar
- Nickname: The Home of Gods
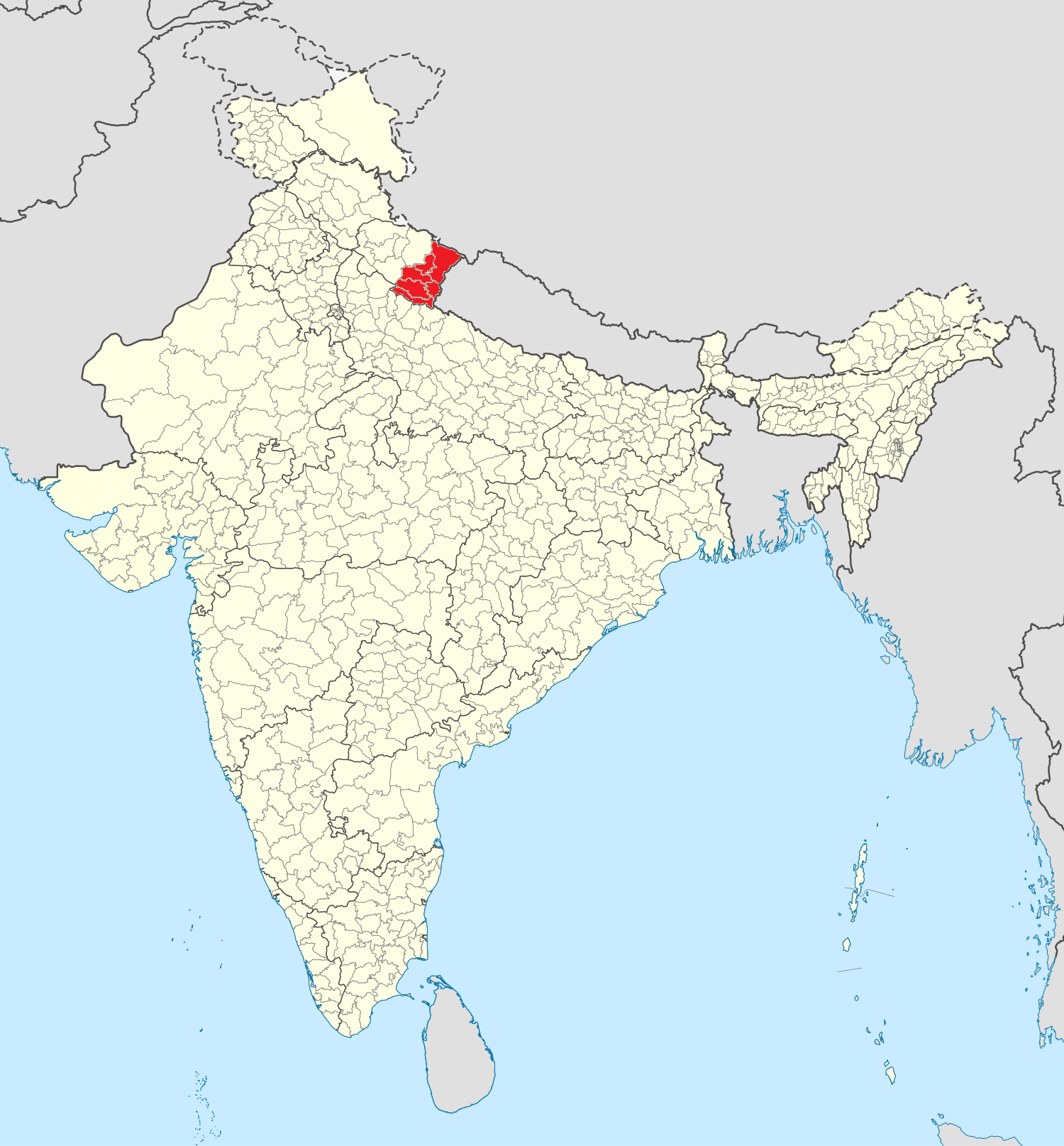
- Location in India
- Country: India
- Established: 1815
- Headquarter: Nainital
- Largest city: Haldwani
- Districts: List: Almora; Bageshwar; Champawat; Nainital; Pithoragarh; Udham Singh Nagar

Government
  - Type: Division
  - Commissioner: Deepak Rawat IAS

Area
  - Total: 21,035 km^{2} (8,122 sq mi)

Population
  - Total: 4,228,998
  - Density: 201.04/km^{2} (520.7/sq mi)
- Demonym: Kumaoni

Languages
  - Official: Hindi
  - Native: Kumaoni, Nepali, Tharu(Buksari), RungLo, Kauravi

Ethnicity
  - Ethnic groups: Kumaoni, Shaukas, Rungs, Bhotiyas, Tharu, Bhoksa
- Time zone: UTC+5:30 (IST)
- Vehicle registration: UK
- Highest peak of Kumaon Division: Hardeol 7,151 m (23,461 ft)
- Lowest elevation of Kumaon Division: Sharda Sagar Reservoir (190 m)
- Largest lake: Bhimtal
- Website: http://kumaon.gov.in/

Kumaon (/ˈkɛmɔːʊ/; Kumaoni: Kumāũ, pronounced [kʊmɔːũː]; historically romanised as Kemāon) is a revenue and administrative division in the Indian state of Uttarakhand. It spans over the eastern half of the state and is bounded on the north by Tibet Autonomous Region of China, on the east by Nepal, on the south by the state of Uttar Pradesh, and on the west by Garhwal Division. Kumāon comprises six districts of the state: Almora, Bageshwar, Champawat, Nainital, Pithoragarh and Udham Singh Nagar.

Historically known as Manaskhand and Kurmanchal, the Kumaon region has been ruled by several dynasties over the course of its history; most notably the Katyuris and the Chands.

The people of Kumaon are known as Kumaonis and speak the Kumaoni language. Kumaon is home to a famous Indian Army regiment, the Kumaon Regiment of IHR within the Indian Republic. The hill town Nainital is its administrative centre and this is where the Uttarakhand high court is located. Other notable hill towns of Kumaon are Almora, Ranikhet, Pithoragarh, Champawat and Bageshwar. However, all the major cities of the region like Haldwani, Rudrapur, Kashipur, Ramnagar and Tanakpur are concentrated in the southern plain areas of Bhabar and Terai.

== Etymology ==
The Kumaon region is mentioned in the Skanda Purana as Manaskhand. Kumaon is believed to have been derived from Kurmanchal, meaning the land of Kurma (the tortoise avatar of Vishnu, the preserver deity in Hinduism).

According to another theory, the word Kumaon can be traced back to the 5th century BC during the time of Vedic period. The Khasas, Assyrians, and the Eurasian nomads who left their homeland, and settled in the northern part of India, initiating a period of acculturation and intermarriage with local indigenous population.

During this time of the British control of the region, between 1815 and 1857, it was also known as Kemaon.

== Geography ==
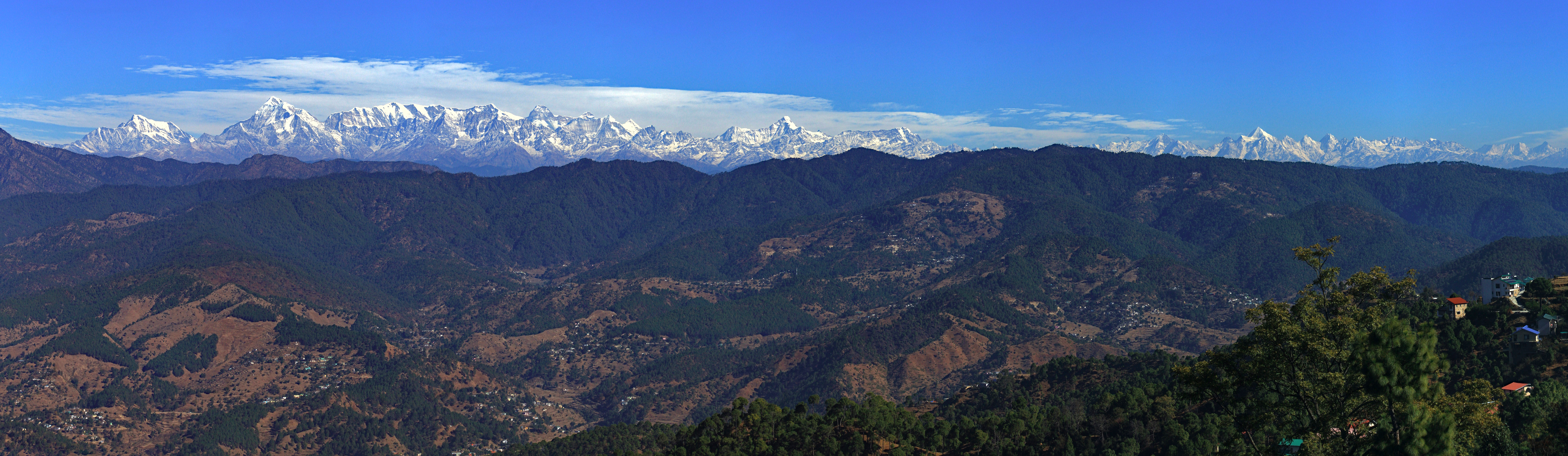
A panoramic view of the Kumaon Himalayas from Ranikhet, showing Trisul (7,120 m (23,360 ft)), Nanda Devi (7,817 m (25,646 ft)), Nanda Kot (6,861 m (22,510 ft)), Panchachuli (6,904 m (22,651 ft)) and other giant peaks

The Kumaon region consists of a large Himalayan tract, together with two submontane strips called the Terai and the Bhabar. The submontane strips were up to 1850 an almost impenetrable forest, given up to wild animals; but after 1850 the numerous clearings attracted a large population from the hills, who cultivated the rich soil during the hot and cold seasons, returning to the hills in the rains. The rest of Kumaon is a maze of mountains, part of the Himalaya range, some of which are among the loftiest known. In a tract not more than 225 km in length and 65 km in breadth there are over thirty peaks rising to elevations exceeding 5,500 m (18,000 ft).

Brahmashaila is a 5,566-metre-high mountain peak located at 30°47′44″ N, 80°05′21″ E, near Shalshal La in the Kumaon Himalaya. Its name combines Brahma, the Hindu creator deity, and the Sanskrit word shaila (“mountain” or “rock”), reflecting its association with the region’s religious and cultural traditions.

Danta Droni (approx. 5,328 m) is a mountain peak in the Kumaon Himalaya of Uttarakhand, located at 30°58′33″N, 79°51′17″E. The name Danta Droni is derived from the Sanskrit words danta ("tooth" or "tusk") and droni ("valley" or "basin"), referring to the peak's distinctive landform, which is traditionally compared to an elephant's tusk.

Shivang Parvat is a 6,481-metre peak in the Kumaon sector, situated between the Kungribingri-La and Mangsya-La passes. It is associated with Lord Shiva in local religious traditions and is located near India’s northern frontier and historic trans-Himalayan routes.

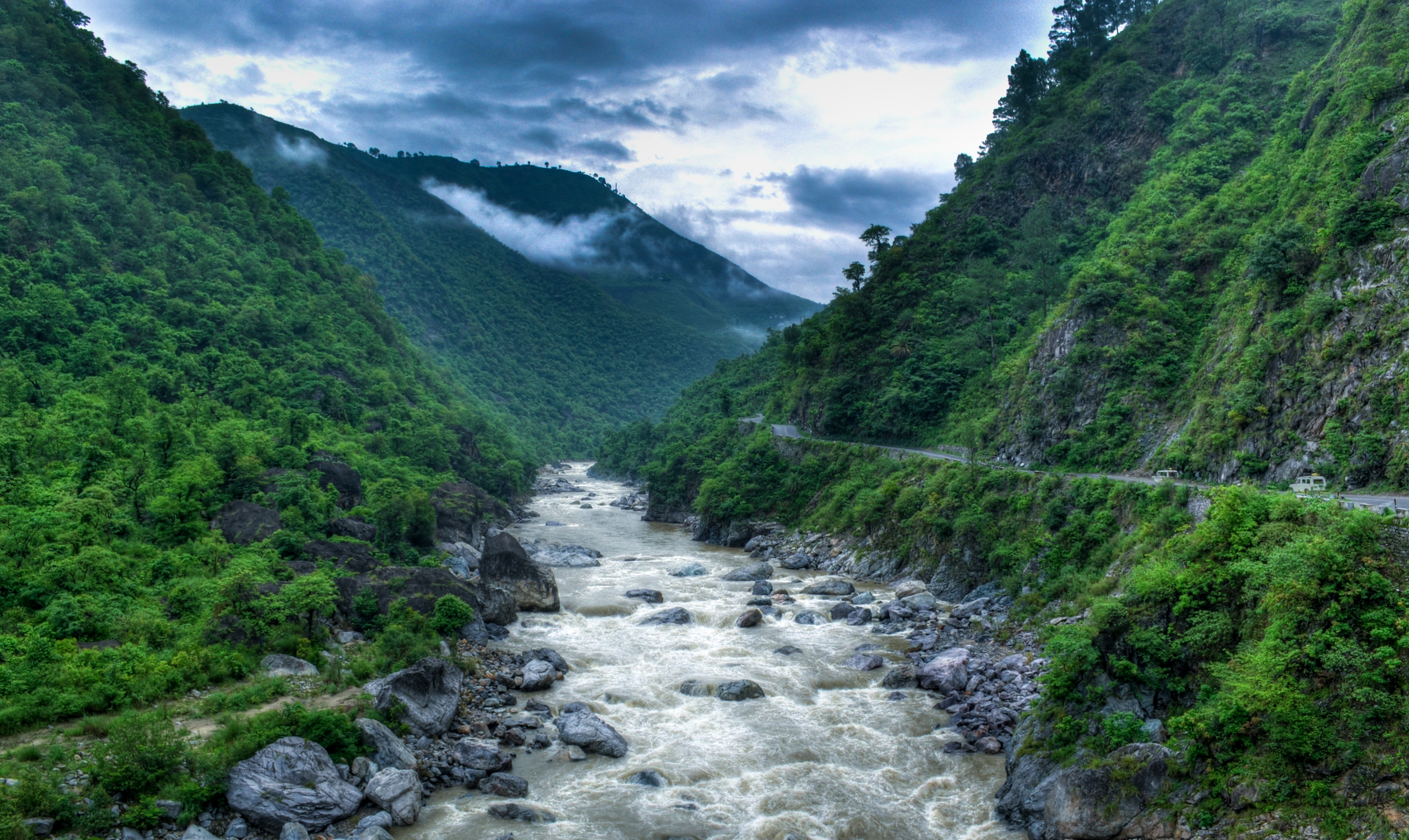
Kosi River valley near Almora

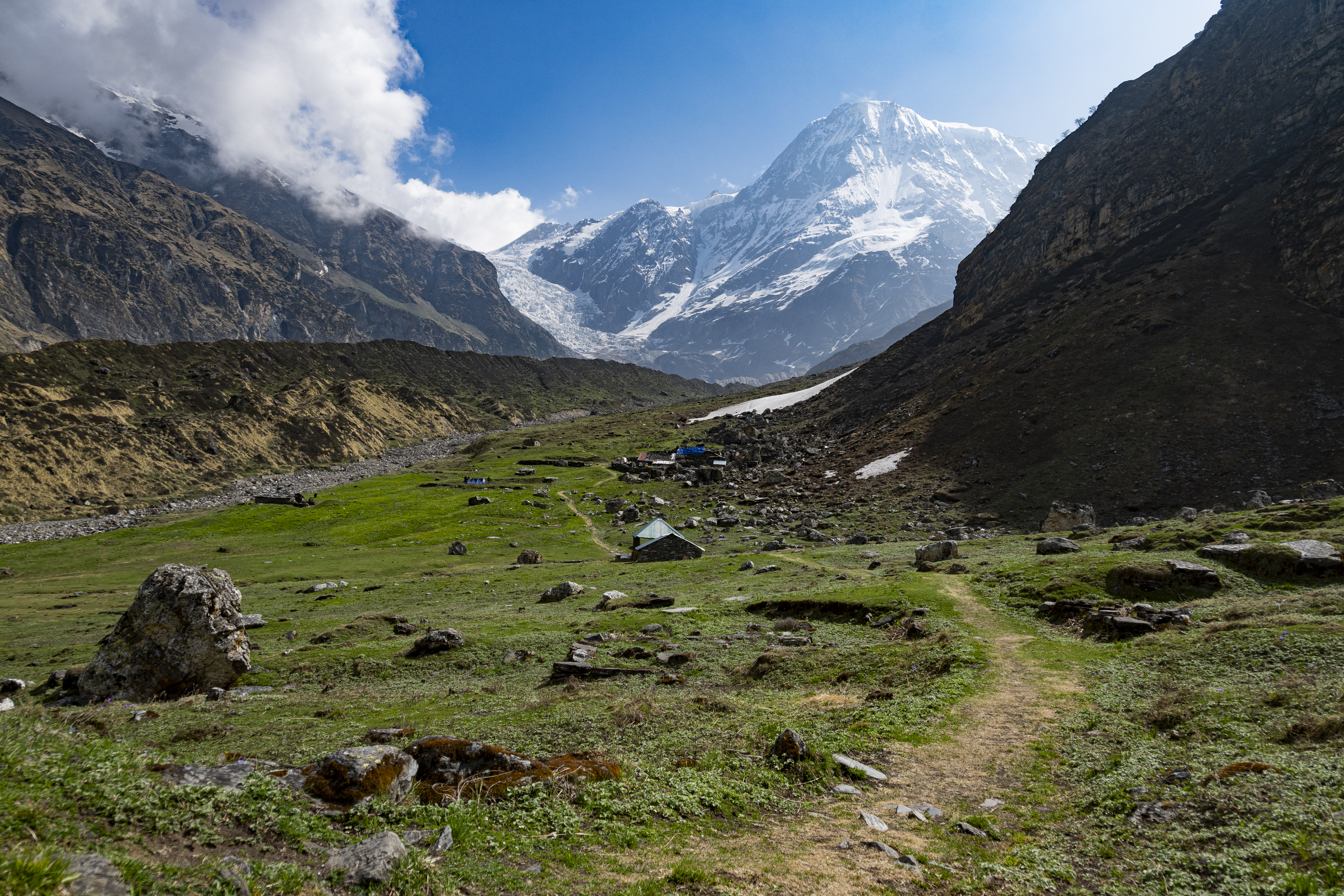
The Pindari glacier, located in the Bageshwar district, is the source of the Pindar river – one of the six major headstreams of the Ganges

Rivers such as Gori, Dhauli, and Kali rise chiefly in the southern slope of the Tibetan watershed north of the loftiest peaks, amongst which they make their way down valleys of rapid declivity and extraordinary depth. The principal is the Sharda (Kali Ganga), the Pindari and Kailganga, whose waters join the Alaknanda. The river Sharda (Kali Ganga) forms the international boundary between India and Nepal. The pilgrim route currently used to visit Kailash-Mansarovar goes along this river and crosses into Tibet at Lipu Lekh pass.

The chief trees are the chir pine, Himalayan cypress, pindrow fir, alder, sal and saindan. Limestone, sandstone, slate, gneiss and granite constitute the principal geological formations. Mines of iron, copper, gypsum, lead and asbestos exist, but they are not thoroughly worked. Except in the submontane strips and deep valleys, the climate is mild. The rainfall of the outer Himalayan range, which is first struck by the monsoon, is double that of the central hills, in the average proportion of 2000 mm to 1000 mm. No winter passes without snow on the higher ridges, and in some years, it is universal throughout the mountain tract. Frosts, especially in the valleys, are often severe.

== History ==
Prehistoric dwellings and Stone Age implements have been discovered in Almora and Nainital districts. The wider Western Himalayas, of which Kumaon formed a part alongside other regions of the west-central Himalayas, was initially inhabited by groups such as the Kols, followed by successive waves of later Indo-Aryan-speaking populations, including the Khasas, alongside other groups such as the Gurjars and Sakas. These later population movements contributed to the ethnocultural formation of the Western Himalayas and were distinct from the earlier Vedic-period Indo-Aryan migrations. Kunindas were among the earliest known rulers of the region. They were followed by the Katyuri kings, associated with Khasa origins, who controlled the region from 700 to 1200 AD.

Around 1100–1200 AD, after Katyuri kingdom disintegration, Kurmanchal was divided into eight different principalities: Baijnath-Katyur, Dwarhat, Doti, Baramandal, Askot, Sira, Sora, Sui. Around 1581 AD, under Rudra Chand, the whole region was brought together again as Kumaon.

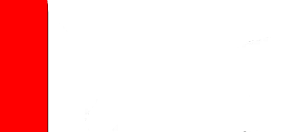
Flag of the Kumaon Kingdom

=== Kumaon Kingdom ===
The Kumaon Kingdom was a historical Himalayan state located in the eastern part of present-day Uttarakhand, India. It existed as an independent political entity for several centuries and played an important role in the regional history of the Central Himalayas. The kingdom covered much of the Kumaon region, including areas around Almora, Champawat, Nainital, and Bageshwar. Its geography consisted of mountainous terrain, river valleys, and forested areas, which influenced its defense, economy, and settlement patterns. Agriculture, pastoralism, and trade formed the economic base of the kingdom. Land revenue systems and local administrative units were used to govern rural areas.

Culturally, the kingdom contributed significantly to the development of Kumaoni language, folklore, religious traditions, and temple architecture. Hinduism was the dominant religion, with strong influences of Shaivism and Shaktism, and the region became known for its temples and pilgrimage centers.

The Kumaon Kingdom maintained a distinct political and cultural identity despite conflicts and interactions with neighboring Himalayan states. Its independence ended in 1791, after which the region came under external rule. Following the Anglo-Nepalese War (1814–1816), Kumaon was incorporated into British India.

=== Katyuri Raj ===
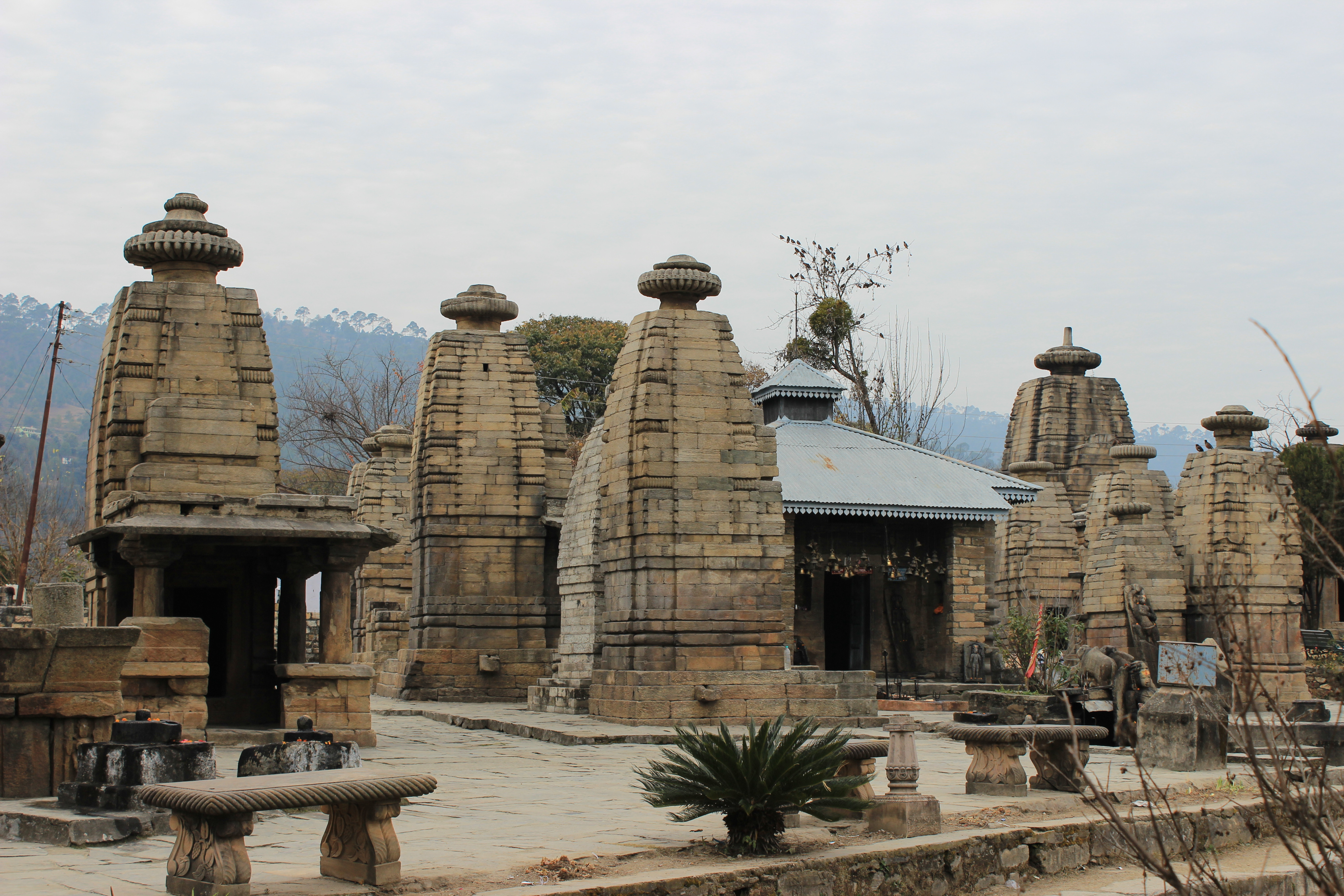

The Katyuri dynasty was a ruling Hindu dynasty of Khasha origin that was founded by Vashudev Katyuri. They established their kingdom and called it Kurmanchal kingdom, dominating lands of varying extent from the 'Katyur' (modern day Baijnath) valley in Kumaon, between 7th and 11th centuries AD, and establishing their capital at Baijnath in Bageshwar district, which was then known as Kartikeyapura and lies in the centre of 'Katyur' valley. Brahmadev mandi in Kanchanpur District of far western Nepal was established by Katyuri king Brahma Deo. At their peak, the kurmanchal kingdom of Katyuri kings was extended from Sikkim in the east to Kabul, Afghanistan in the west, before fragmenting into numerous principalities by the 12th century.

It is believed that from king Dham Deo and Bir Deo the downfall of this powerful dynasty began. Birdeo used to collect heavy taxes and forced his people to work as his slaves, King Birdeo teased his subjects by his tyranny to the extent that he forcibly married his own maternal aunt Tila. It is said that the Kumaoni folk song Mami tile dharo bola became popular from that very day. after death of Birdeo the kingdom was divided between his eight sons and they were able to form their different small kingdoms in the region for a short period of time until Chands emerged in the region defeating most of katyuri principalities and united Kurmanchal again as Kumaon.

The Rajwar dynasty of Askot in Pithoragarh, was set up in 1279 AD, by a branch of the Katyuri kings, headed by Abhay Pal Deo, who was the grandson of Katyuri king Brahma Deo. The dynasty ruled the region until it became part of the British Raj through the treaty of Sighauli in 1816.

=== Chand Raj ===
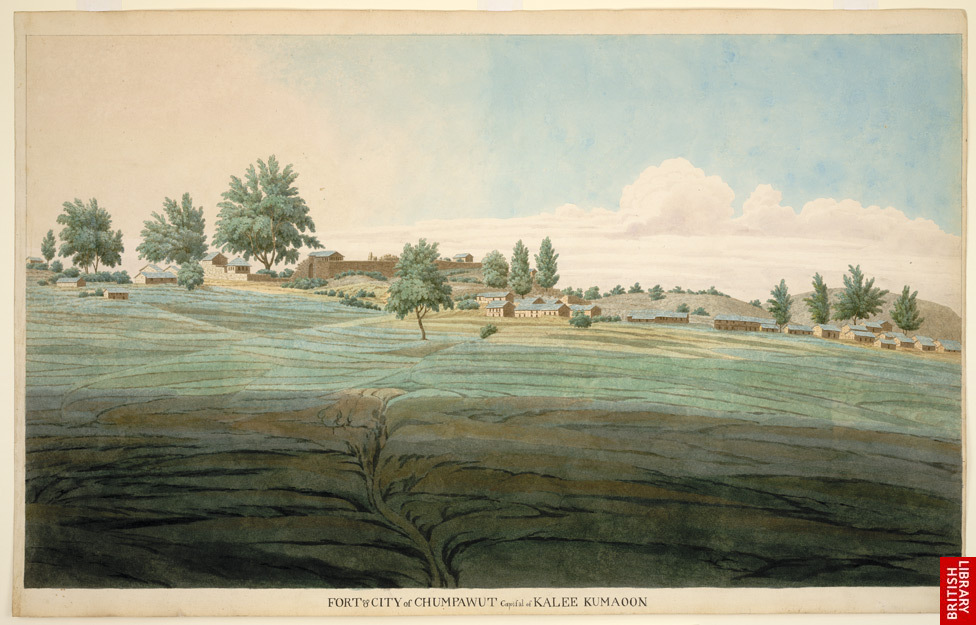
Fort in Champawat, the first capital of Chand Kings, 1815

The Chand dynasty was established by Som Chand in the 10th century, by displacing the Katyuri Kings, who had been ruling the area from the 7th century AD. He continued to call his state Kurmanchal and established its capital in Champawat in Kali Kumaon called so, due to its vicinity to river Kali. Many temples built in this former capital city, during the 11th and 12th century exist today, this includes the Baleshwar and Nagnath temples.

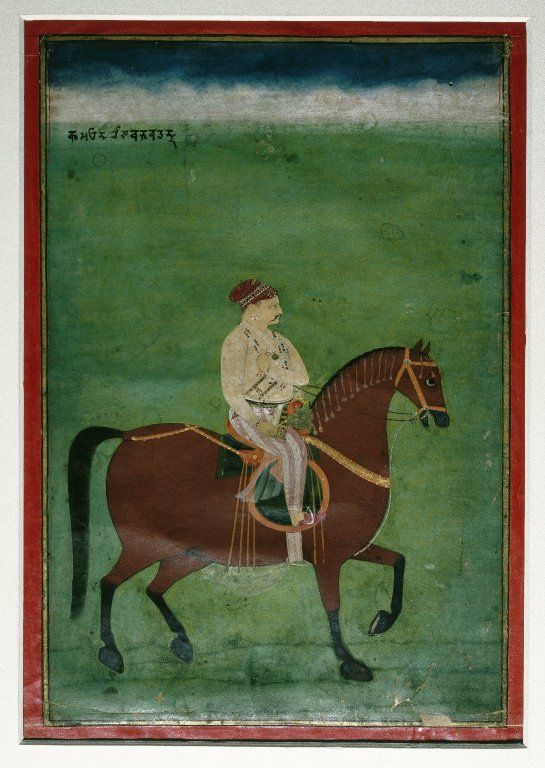
Baj Bahadur of Kumaon c. 1750

One of the most powerful rulers of Chand dynasty was Baz Bahadur (1638–1678 AD), who met Shahjahan in Delhi, and in 1655 joined forces with him to attack Garhwal, which was then under the King Pirthi Sah. Baz Bahadur subsequently captured the Terai region including Dehradun, which was thus separated from the Garhwal kingdom. Baz Bahadur extended his territory east to Karnali river, later Baz Bahadur invaded Tibet and captured several forts including a Hindu pilgrim Kailash Manasarovar. he also built the Golu Devata Temple, at Ghorakhal, near Bhimtal, after Lord Golu, a general in his army, who died valiantly in battle. He also built the famous Bhimeshwara Mahadev Temple at Bhimtal.

Towards the end of the 17th century, Chand kings again attacked the Garhwal kingdom, and in 1688, Udyot Chand erected several temples at Almora, including Tripur Sundari, Udyot Chandeshwar, and Parbateshwar. To mark his victory over Garhwal and Doti, the Parbateshwar temple was renamed twice, to become the present Nanda Devi temple. Later, Jagat Chand (1708–1720) defeated the Raja of Garhwal and pushed him away from Srinagar (in Uttarakhand, not to be confused with the capital of present-day Indian Kashmir), and his kingdom was given to a Brahmin.

=== Nepalese invasion and its defeat ===
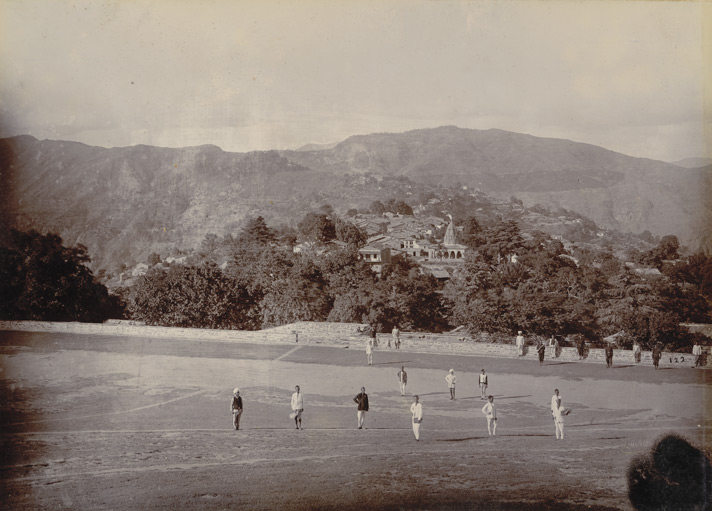
Soldiers of 3rd Gurkha Rifles in Almora, 1895

In the latter half of the 18th century, the power of Kumaon was on decline, as the king Mahendra Chand was unable to properly administer the country. After the fall of Doti, the Kingdom of Nepal decided to again invade over Kumaon. The Gorkha forces, under the leadership of Amar Singh Thapa crossed the kali river, and reached the outskirts of Almora via Sor and Gangoli. After facing tough resistance by King Mahendra Chand's uncle who was leading the army, and retreating temporarily, the Gorkha's returned again and in the ensuing battle Mahendra Chand's uncle was killed. Hearing about his uncle's death, Mahendra Chandra became frightened and fled to the plains. Kumaon was annexed to the Kingdom of Nepal in 1790.

The Gorkha rule over Kumaon lasted for 24 years. The only architectural advancements during the period was a road connecting kali river to Srinagar via Almora. The Gorkha rule over Kumaon is said to have been cruel and barbaric. The Gorkha's only thought of Kumaon and Garwhal (which was conquered some years after the invasion of Kumaon) as frontier states and so proper administration was not practiced. Almora was the largest town of Kumaon during the Gorkha period, and is estimated to have about 1000 houses.

After the Gorkhas started meddling in the territories of Oudh, the Nawab of Oudh, who was then a suzerain of the British Empire, asked for their help, thus paving way for the Anglo-Nepalese War of 1814. The British forces under Colonel Nicholas, consisting of about forty five hundred men and six pounder guns, entered Kumaon through Kashipur and conquered Almora on 26 April 1815. On the same day, Chandra Bahadur Shah, one of the principle Gurkha chiefs, sent a flag of truce, requesting to end hostilities in the region. A negotiation was brought up the following day, under which the Gurkhas agreed to leave the Country, and all its fortified places. The war ended with Nepal signing the Treaty of Sugauli in 1816, under which, Kumaon officially became a British territory.

=== British Raj ===
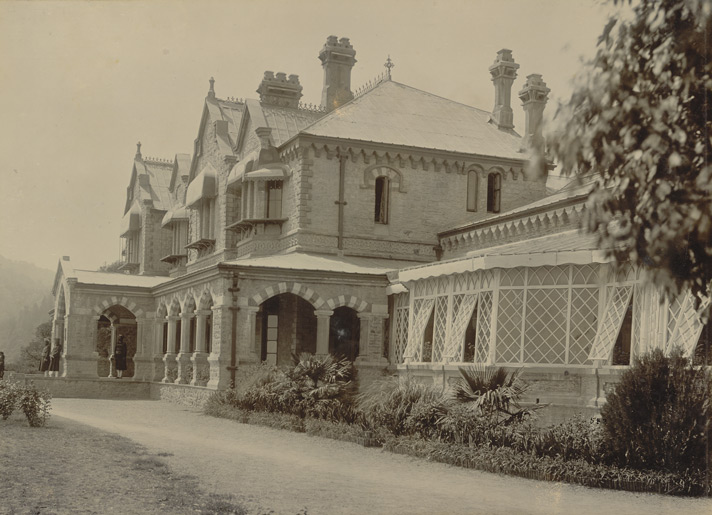
Old Govt House at Nainital, the summer capital of United Provinces during British Raj

The region was annexed by the British East India Company in 1815, and the Kumaon region was joined with the eastern half of the Garhwal region as a chief-commissionership on the non-regulation system, also known as the Kumaon Province. It was part of the Ceded and Conquered Provinces. It was governed for seventy years by three administrators, Mr. Traill, Mr. J. H. Batten and Sir Henry Ramsay.

There was widespread opposition against British rule in various parts of Kumaon. The Kumaoni people especially Champawat District rose in rebellion against the British during the Indian Rebellion of 1857 under the leadership of the members like Kalu Singh Mahara. In 1891 the division was composed of the three districts of Kumaon, Garhwal and the Tarai; but the two districts of Kumaon and the Tarai were subsequently redistributed and renamed after their headquarters, Nainital and Almora.

The area received international attention after the publication of Man-Eaters of Kumaon, by Jim Corbett, the noted hunter and conservationist, describing the author's trials seeking out and killing man-eating tigers. Animals like the Champawat Tiger and the Chowgarh Tigers plagued the area for many years, with the former estimated to have killed over four hundred humans by herself, in Nepal and then Kumaon, in the years 1920–1928.

Mahatma Gandhi's advent sounded a death knell for the British in Kumaon. People now aware of the excesses of British Raj became defiant of it and played an active part in the Indian Struggle for Independence. While staying in Kumaon for 12 days, recovering from the rigors of imprisonment, Gandhi wrote Anashakti Yoga, his commentary on the Gita.

In these hills, nature's hospitality eclipses all men can do. The enchanting beauty of Himalayas, their bracing climate and the soothing green that envelopes you leaves nothing more to be desired. I wonder whether the scenery of these hills and the climate are surpassed, if equalled, by any of the beauty spots anywhere of the world. After having been nearly three weeks in Almora hills, I am more than ever amazed why our people need go to Europe in search of health.

— Mahatma Gandhi, Almora Impressions, Young India (11 July 1929)

Gandhi was revered in these parts and on his call the struggle of Salam Saliya Satyagraha led by Ram Singh Dhoni was started which shook the very roots of British rule in Kumaon. Many people died in the Saalam Satyagraha due to police brutality. Gandhi named it the Bardoli of Kumaon an allusion to the Bardoli Satyagrah. Many Kumaonis also joined the Indian National Army led by Netaji Subhash Chandra Bose.

=== Independent India ===
After India became independent in 1947, United Provinces were converted into the newly formed Indian state of Uttar Pradesh. The princely state of Tehri Garhwal joined the Indian Union in 1949, and became a district under the Kumaon division. Three new districts viz. Pithoragarh from Almora, Chamoli from Garhwal and Uttarkashi from Tehri Garhwal were created in 1960. A new revenue division, named Uttarakhand division, was carved out from these three districts of Kumaon division.

The year 1969 saw major administrative reforms in these hilly regions of Uttar Pradesh, and a new Garhwal division, with its headquarter in Pauri, was formed with the districts of Tehri Garhwal and Garhwal from Kumaon division, and Uttarkashi and Chamoli from Uttarakhand division. The Uttarakhand division too was disestablished the same year, and the remaining district of Pithoragarh was brought back to Kumaon division, hence giving it its present size.

Three new districts were created in the 90's, taking the total number of districts in the division to six. Udham singh nagar from Nainital in 1995, and Bageshwar from Almora and Champawat from Pithoragarh in 1997. As a result of the largely peaceful Uttarakhand movement, the state of Utarranchal was carved out of Uttar Pradesh in 2000; this state's name was changed to Uttarakhand in 2007. Two new districts, Ranikhet from Almora and Didihat from Pithoragarh, were announced in 2011 by the then Chief minister of Uttarakhand, Ramesh Pokhriyal, but the districts never came into existence because no official notification was ever released.

== Culture ==
=== Traditional attire ===
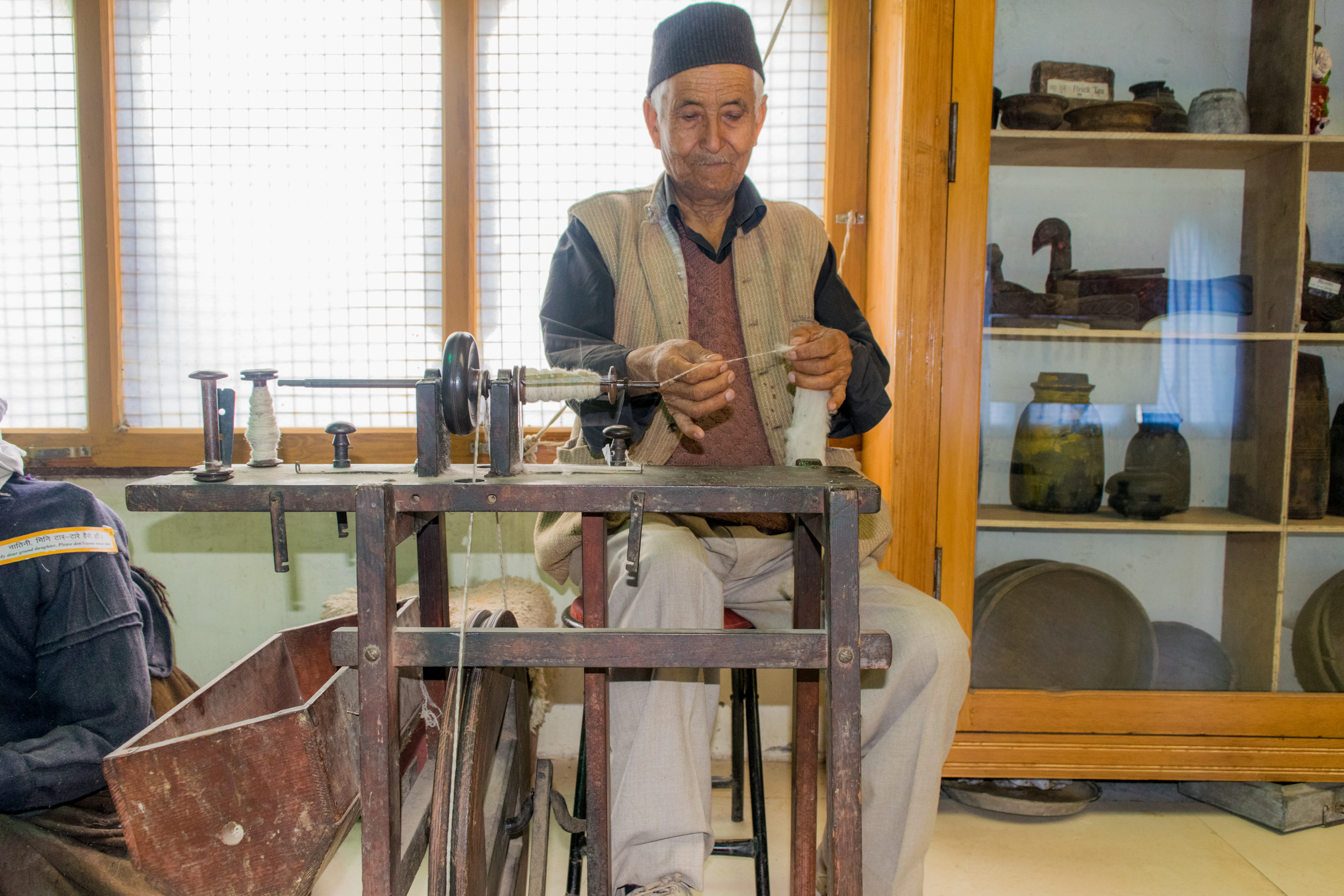
An elderly tailor in Pithoragarh wearing traditional Kumaoni cap

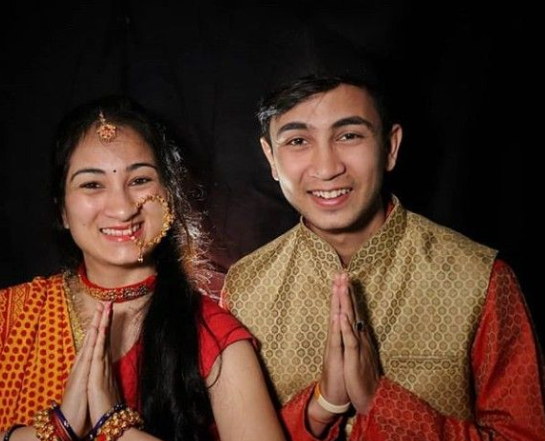
Kumaoni man and woman in a traditional dress

Kumaoni attire of the Central Himalayas

Pichaura (पिछोङा) is a traditional attire worn by married Kumaoni women generally for religious occasions, marriage, and other rituals. Traditionally handmade using vegetable dyes, Pichhauras are available in red and saffron. Local designs made in Almora, Haldwani and other parts of Kumaon use silk fabric and accessories made of pearl. It is also contemporarily made using machines. In recent years its popularity has seen a rise, especially in Kumaoni diaspora in other states and countries.

Kumaoni men wear a Kumaoni cap, which is of black colour. However, during festivals, especially during Kumauni Holi the cap becomes white in colour.

Kumaoni children

The Bhotiya community, also known as Kumaoni Bhotiya, is a minority indigenous group in the Kumaon region of Uttarakhand. Traditionally inhabiting the high-altitude areas, the community has historically been involved in trans-Himalayan trade, animal husbandry, and agriculture. Their cultural practices, dress, and festivals reflect influences from both Himalayan and Tibetan traditions.

=== Folk art ===
Aipan is the most famous folk art of Kumaon. In recent times its popularity has grown. Aipan is not only an important folk art of Kumaoni community but other ethnic groups of Kumaon, like Shaukas and Rungs, as well. Hence it also acts as a cultural link between different ethnic communities of Kumaon, therefore has significant importance.

Among the prominent local crafts is wood carving known as Likhai, which appears most frequently in the ornately decorated temples and at the doors and windows of local houses. Intricately carved designs of floral patterns, deities, and geometrical motifs also decorate the doors, windows, ceilings, and walls of village houses. Paintings and murals are used to decorate both houses and temples.

Jyuti patta is a class of water color paintings done on rituals, called Jyuti. Some scholars also consider Jyuti to be synonymous with the wod mother of the world. To give concrete form to the deity, two-dimensional geometry is given expression in the form of frescoes. This is a geometric or decorative semi-graphic structure in which different colours and symbols are used. This structure called Jyuti also gets a new dimension by the use of ochre or biswar of Tepan. Jyunti is prepared on the surface of wall or paper and the composition is given with cotton and a brush of limiter. In this artform, various qualities of a specific deity are shown.

=== Folk dances ===
Many classical dance forms and folk art are practised in the Kumaon. Some well-known dances include Hurkiya Baul, Jhora-Chanchri and Chholiya. Music is an integral part of the Kumaoni culture. Popular types of folk songs include Mangal and Nyoli. These folk songs are played on instruments including dhol, damau, turri, ransingha, dholki, daur, thali, bhankora, mandan and mashakbaja. A famous Kumaoni folk song is Bedu Pako Baro Masa. Music is also used as a medium through which the gods are invoked. Jagar is a form of spirit worship in which the singer, or Jagariya, sings a ballad of the gods, with allusions to great epics, like Mahabharat and Ramayana, that describe the adventures and exploits of the god being invoked.

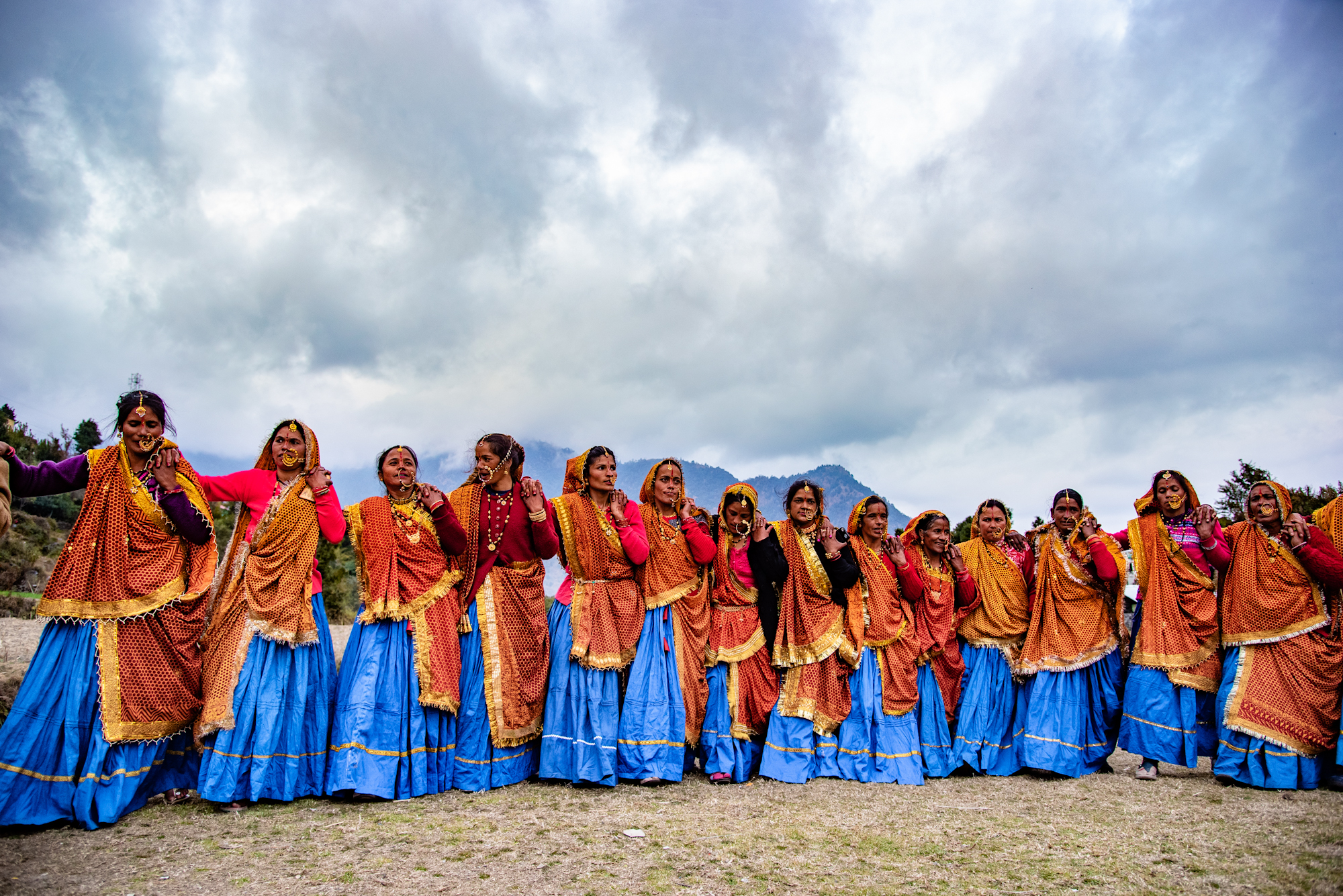
Chanchari of Danpur (Bageshwar)

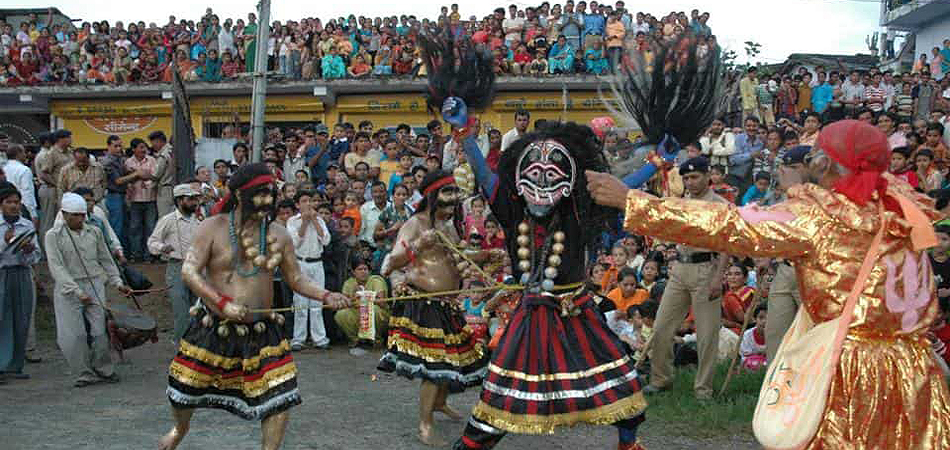
Hiljatra in Pithoragarh

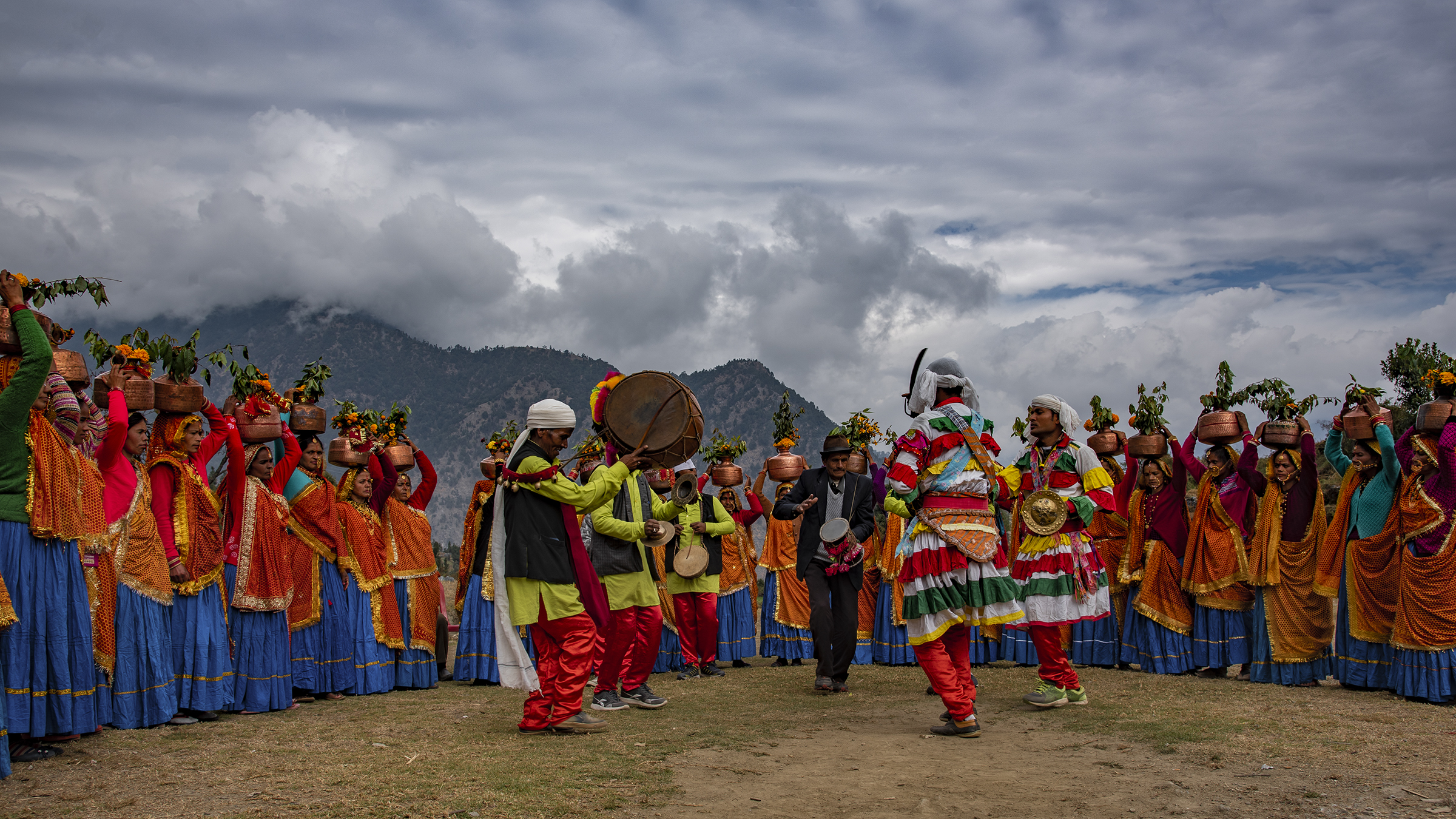
Chholiyar performing Choliya dance

Kumaoni Ramleela is the oldest in the world. It is 150 years old, due to which UNESCO has declared it world's longest-running opera. In addition, the Kumaoni Ramleela is now a part of the World Cultural Heritage List.

Harela is a kumaoni festival hypothesized to date back to the indigenous population. 10–11 days before the Sankranti of Shravan, a bed is made by adding soil in bamboo pots etc. Grains grown during the rainy season like paddy, maize, urad etc. are sown, this is called Hariyala. Harakali Mahotsav, Idols of Gauri Maheshwar, Ganesha and Karkitkeya are made from clay, coloured in them and worshiped with various fruits, flowers, dishes and sweets in a bed of greenery on the night of the month of Sanat. On the second day, the Harela of Uttarang Puja is placed on the head. Sisters and daughters-in-law apply tilak and tilak and put Harela on their heads. They are given gifts.

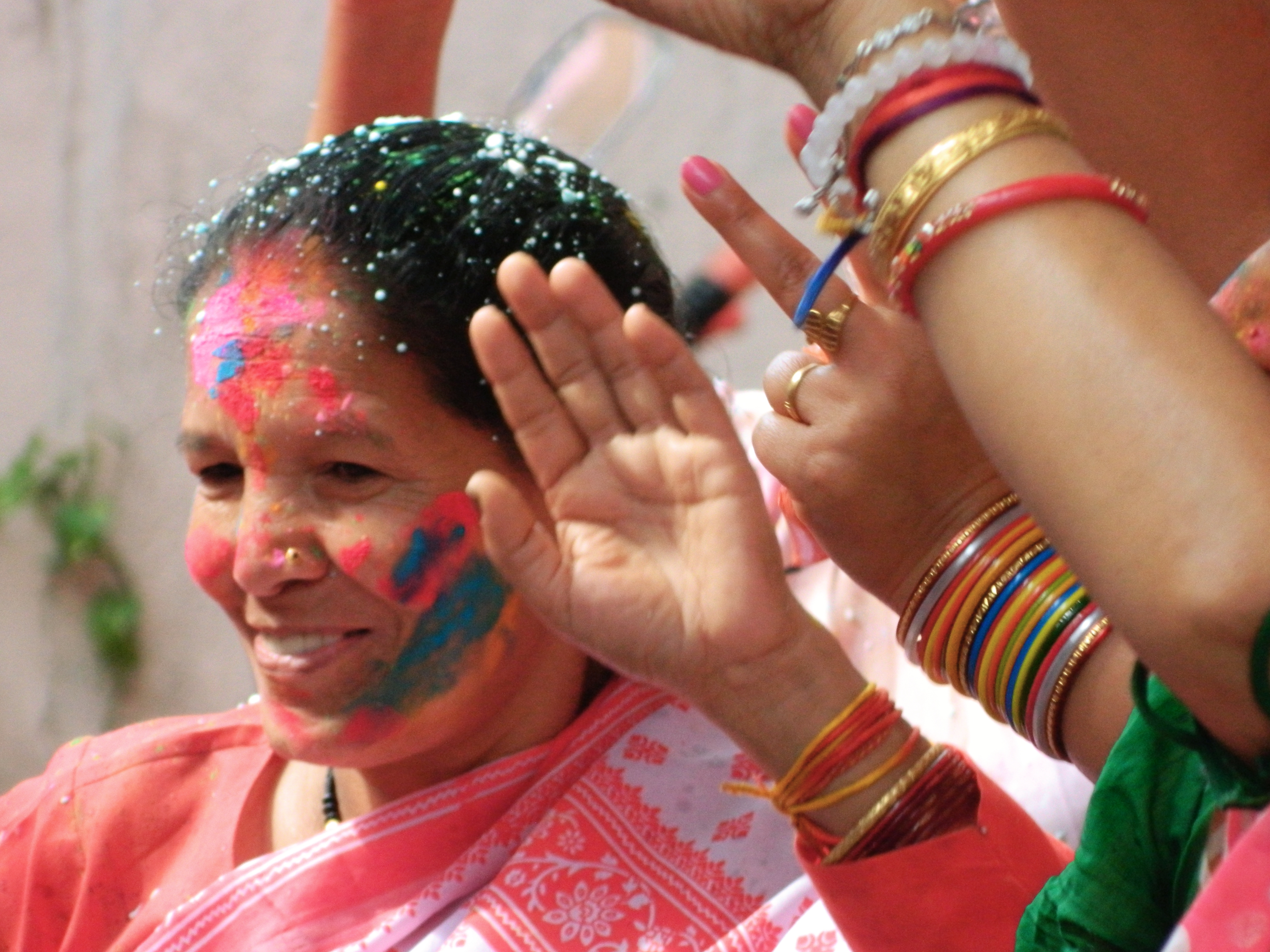
Holi Festival Celebration in Haldwani

Kumaoni holi is the historical and cultural celebration of the Hindu festival of Holi. It is one of the most important festivals for the Kumauni people as it signifies not only the victory of good over evil but also end of the winter season and the start of the new sowing season which holds great importance for this agricultural community of the North Indian Himalayas. The uniqueness of the Kumaoni Holi lies in its being a musical affair, whatever its form, be it the Baithki Holi, the Khari Holi and the Mahila Holi all of which start from Basant Panchmi. This results in the festivities of Holi lasting for almost two months in Kumaon.

The Baithki Holi and Khari Holi are unique in that the songs on which they are based have a combination of melody, fun, and spiritualism. These songs are essentially based on classical ragas. Baithki Holi is also known as Nirvan Ki Holi or Holi of Salvation.

Almora Dussehra is a regional variant of Dussehra, dating back to 1936. It is distinct for burning fifteen distinct effigies, each representing the members of the Hindu mythological villain Ravana's entire bloodline. The effigies are all ornate and exquisitely designed. They are paraded through the city of Almora before finally being set on fire to symbolise the triumph of good over evil.

Phool-Dei is a folk festival which welcomes the spring season in the state. The festival is celebrated on the first day of the Hindu month, Chaitra. In some places, the festival is celebrated as carnival and the celebration goes on for a month. The term 'Dei' refers to a ceremonial pudding which is the key food in this festival that is made from jaggery. White flour and curd are also offered. Young children gather together and go to every house in their village/towns with plates full of rice, jaggery, coconut, green leaves, and flowers. In return, they are presented with blessings and gifts like sweets, jaggery, and money. The wishing and blessing part also include placing flowers and rice on the doorsteps of the houses by the children. People of village sing and dance on their folk songs to celebrate the festival of spring along with exchanging wishes for well-being and prosperity of their family and relatives.

Bhitauli is a cultural tradition where married women's brothers visit them with gifts and sweets during the month of Chaitra. Typically, the woman's brothers will visit her in her marital home as a means to ensure her well being and happiness. The tradition is not exclusive to newlywed brides, with elderly women continuing to receive visits.

=== Cultural hubs ===
- Almora – Almora (famous for its bal mithai candy) is considered the cultural capital of Kumaon.

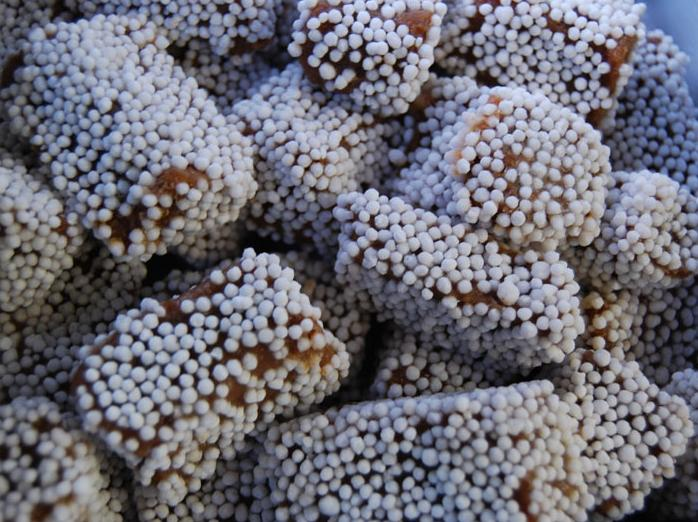
Bal Mithai originated in Almora, and now has become a symbol of Kumaoni cuisine.

- Nainital – Nainital is by far the most well known tourist destination of Kumaon. The city has played a major role in exporting the Kumaoni culture to the rest of India.

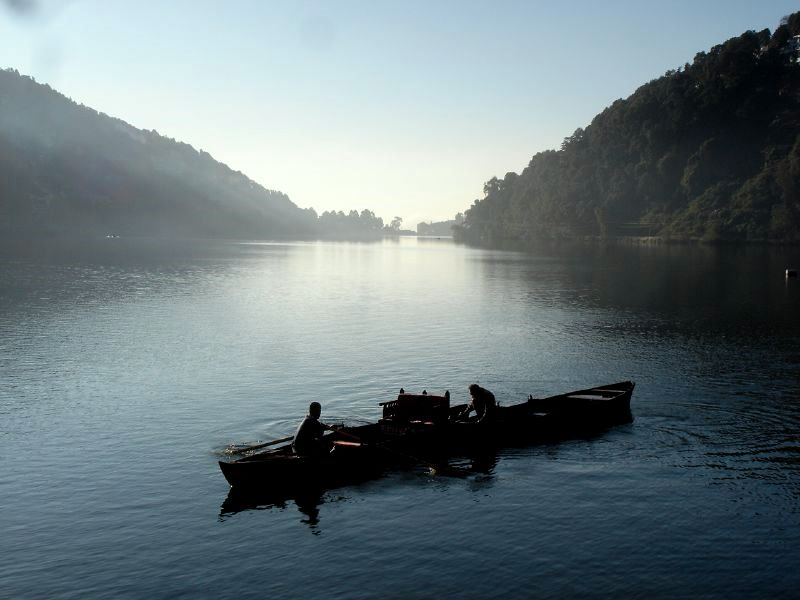
Naini dwellers in the morning

- Pithoragarh – The city is known for its distinctive and unique culture. It has been one of the major hubs of Kumaoni culture and is the largest city in the hills of Kumaon.
- Champawat – Also known as Kali Kumaon, Champawat is the root of Kumaoni culture. It is from this place Kumaon got its name.
- Bageshwar – Bageshwar is known as "Kumaok Kashi" (Kumaon's Kashi), because of the holy Saryu flowing through it. Bageshwar is the home to the largest Kumaoni fair "Uttarayini".
- Haldwani – Though it is situated in Bhabhar, Haldwani has played a very significant role in shaping Kumaon's history and culture. It is Kumaon's largest city and has recently become a hub of artists, who are promoting Kumaoni language and culture.
- Rudrapur – Rudrapur is undoubtedly Kumaon's most cosmopolitan city, with a significant presence of Punjabi, Bengali and other migrants. However, Kumaonis form a large part of the city. Rudrapur is known as Kumaon's Financial Capital.

== Religious significance ==
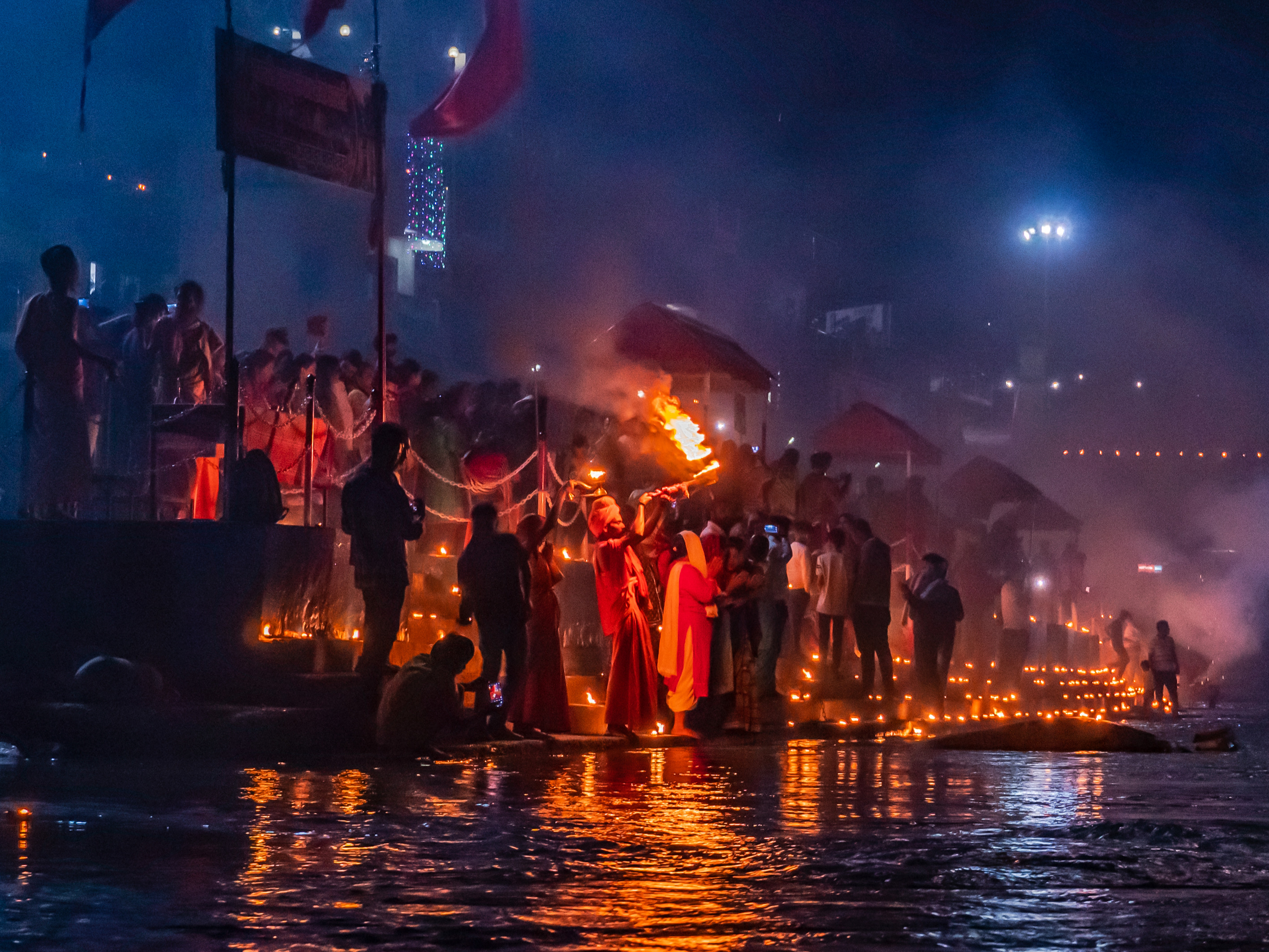
Aarti at Sarju Ghat, Bageshwar

In Kumaon, every peak, lake or mountain range is somehow or the other connected with some myth or the name of a god or goddess, ranging from those associated with the Shaiva, Shakta and Vaishnava traditions, to local gods like Bambai Nath Swami, Haim, Saim, Golu, Nanda, Sunanda, Chhurmal, Kail Bisht, Bholanath, Gangnath, Airi and Chaumu. Referring to the rich religious myths and lores associated with Kumaon, E. T. Atkinson has said, "To the beliefs of the great majority of Hindus, the Kumaon is what Palestine is to the Christians".

== Economy ==
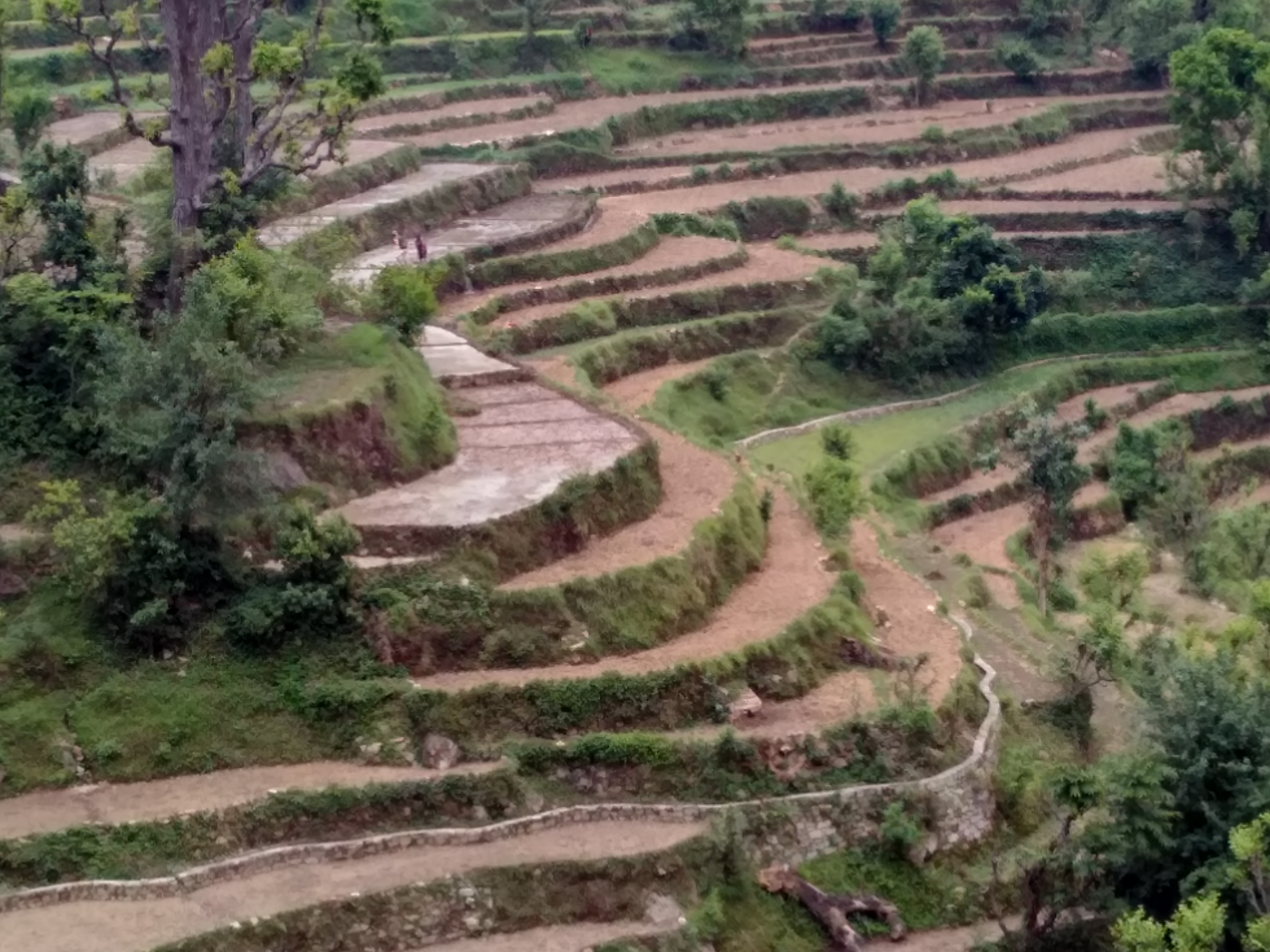
Paddy cultivation in Pithoragarh district

Kumaon is home to the financial capital of the state, Haldwani. Kumaon has the state's most commercial, economic and industrial activities specially in Bhabar and Terai regions. Agriculture also plays a huge role in Kumaoni economy. It employs a large percentage of Kumaoni population.

=== Economic hubs ===
- Haldwani – Being the largest city of Kumaon, and the gateway of Kumaon, Haldwani is the financial centre of Kumaon. It is often dubbed as the financial capital, having the most commercial activity of the state.
- Rudrapur – Rudrapur has established itself as a significant trading center within the Udham Singh Nagar district, which itself is a big trading center in Kumaon. The district exports include industrial as well as agricultural products, both of which are predominantly channelled from Rudrapur. The Basmati rice from Rudrapur is among the top crop which is produced in the region. Post the setup of State Infrastructure and Industrial Development Corporation of Uttarakhand Limited (SIDCUL), enhanced by the broad-gauge railway network in the area, Rudrapur has developed into an industrial city with its city limits expanding to accommodate new residential demands of the workers and professionals moving into the area.

=== Agriculture ===
Basmati rice, Red rice, wheat, Ragi (Madua in Kumaoni), soybeans, groundnuts, coarse cereals, pulses, and oil seeds are the most widely grown crops. Fruits like apples, oranges, pears, peaches, lychees, and plums are widely grown and are important to the large food processing industry. Ramgarh, in Nainital District, specially, is famous for its fruits.

Tea is also cultivated in Berinag, Bhowali, Champawat and Lohaghat. Berinag tea being specially famous for its taste. Champawat's tea is sold by the name "Kumaon Black Tea".

== Administrative Subdivisions ==
Code	District	Headquarters	Population (As of 2011)	Area (km^{2})	Density (/km^{2})	Map
AL	Almora	Almora	621,972	3,083	201	
BA	Bageshwar	Bageshwar	259,840	2,302	113	
CP	Champawat	Champawat	259,315	1,781	146	
NA	Nainital	Nainital	955,128	3,860	247	
PI	Pithoragarh	Pithoragarh	485,993	7,100	68	
US	Udham Singh Nagar	Rudrapur	1,648,367	2,908	567	
Total			4,230,615	21,034	201	

== Cities ==
Largest cities or towns in Kumaon division 2011 Census of India
Rank		District	Pop.	Rank		District	Pop.
1	Haldwani	Nainital	232,060	11	Bajpur	Udham Singh Nagar	25,524
2	Rudrapur	Udham Singh Nagar	154,485	12	Mukhani	Nainital	22,475
3	Kashipur	Udham Singh Nagar	121,610	13	Nagla	Udham Singh Nagar	22,258
4	Pithoragarh	Pithoragarh	56,044	14	Umru Khurd	Udham Singh Nagar	20,593
5	Ramnagar	Nainital	54,787	15	Gadarpur	Udham Singh Nagar	19,301
6	Jaspur	Udham Singh Nagar	50,523	16	Ranikhet	Almora	18,886
7	Kichha	Udham Singh Nagar	41,965	17	Tanakpur	Champawat	17,626
8	Nainital	Nainital	49,272	18	Khatima	Udham Singh Nagar	15,093
9	Almora	Almora	48,456	19	Mahua Kheraganj	Udham Singh Nagar	12,584
10	Sitarganj	Udham Singh Nagar	29,965	20	Dineshpur	Udham Singh Nagar	11,343

== Languages ==
Languages of Kumaon (2011)
1. Kumaoni (46.8%)
2. Hindi (36.1%)
3. Punjabi (4.40%)
4. Urdu (4.10%)
5. Bengali (3.20%)
6. Tharu (1.10%)
7. Others (4.30%)

The main language used in administration and education is Hindi, which according to the 2011 census is the first language of well over a million of the region's inhabitants (mostly concentrated in the south). The major native language, however, is Kumaoni, spoken by about 2 million people.

In the southern districts there are also sizeable numbers of speakers of Punjabi, Urdu and Bengali, while the two related languages of Buksa and Rana Tharu are found in the southernmost Udham Singh Nagar district. The higher mountains in the north of Kumaon are home to the Sino-Tibetan Byangsi, Chaudangsi, Darmiya, Raji, Rawat and Rangas (the last now extinct).

The community radio station Kumaon Vani has been broadcasting over the region since 2010.

Kumaon division: mother-tongue of population, according to the 2011 Indian Census.
Mother tongue code	Mother tongue	District						Kumaon division	
Mother tongue code	Mother tongue	Pithoragarh	Bageshwar	Almora	Champawat	Nainital	Udham Singh Nagar	People	Percentage
002007	Bengali	414	67	555	519	4,174	129,537	135,266	3.2%
006102	Bhojpuri	1,654	200	885	462	6,688	60,141	70,030	1.7%
006195	Garhwali	1,634	1,867	17,939	561	15,348	5,840	43,189	1.0%
006240	Hindi	35,590	10,680	33,198	50,254	369,373	1,028,354	1,527,449	36.1%
006340	Kumauni	423,862	243,965	561,642	203,022	462,493	86,078	1,981,062	46.8%
006439	Pahari	653	7	200	193	683	2,067	3,803	0.1%
010014	Tharu	10	74	0	83	364	47,501	48,032	1.1%
014011	Nepali	7,259	2,158	2,604	1,266	5,984	1,622	20,893	0.5%
016038	Punjabi	383	101	536	378	19,644	166,327	187,369	4.4%
022015	Urdu	1,224	222	1,408	1,474	63,170	105,148	172,646	4.1%
046003	Halam	5,623	157	18	15	94	38	5,945	0.1%
053005	Gujari	8	0	1	0	1,416	859	2,284	0.1%
–	Others	5,125	400	3,520	1,421	5,174	15,390	31,030	0.7%
Total		483,439	259,898	622,506	259,648	954,605	1,648,902	4,228,998	100.0%
