= Kumaoni people =

Ethnolinguistic group of India and Nepal

Kumaonis
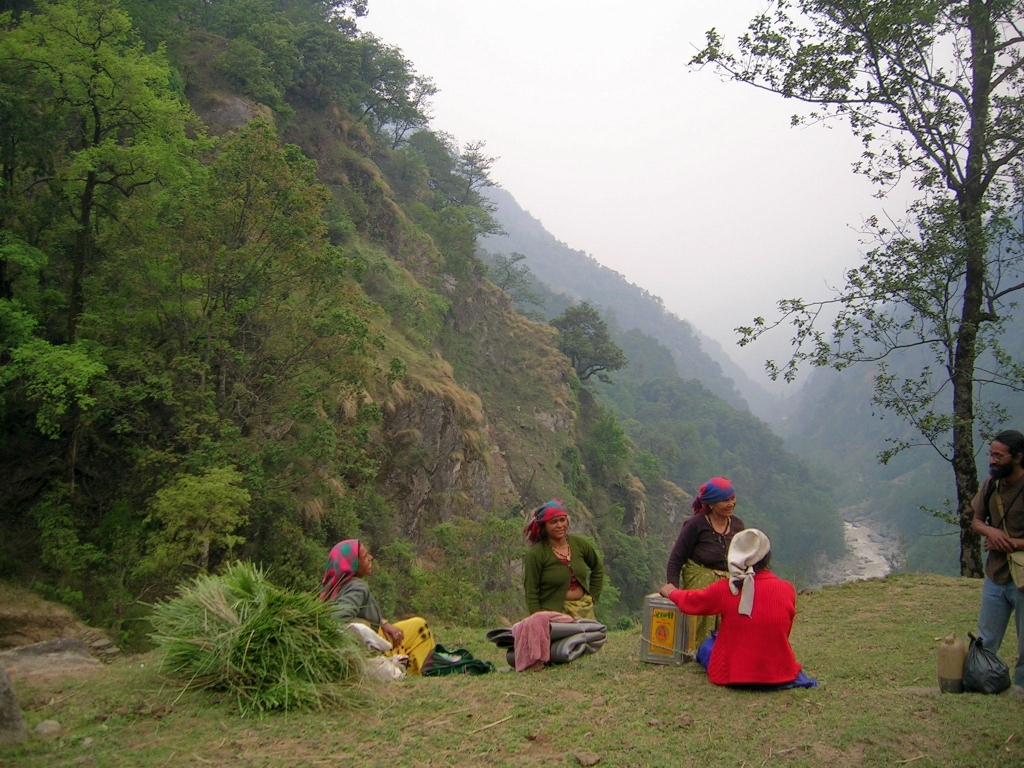
- Kumaoni women near Pithoragarh

Regions with significant populations
- India (Kumaon): 2.2 million* (2011 census)

Languages
- Kumaoni

Religion
- Majority; Hinduism; Minority: Buddhism

Related ethnic groups
- other Indo-Aryans, Khas people, Garhwali people
- *The population figures are only of the number of speakers of the Kumaoni language. May not include ethnic Kumaonis who no longer speak the Kumaoni language, but other languages.

Kumaonis, also known as Kumaiye and Kumain (in Nepal), are an Indo-Aryan ethnolinguistic group who speak Kumaoni as their first-language and live mostly in Kumaon division in the state of Uttarakhand in India.

Kumaoni is also used as a term for people who have their origin in Kumaon. The word Kumain is a direct derivative of Kumaoni.

== History ==
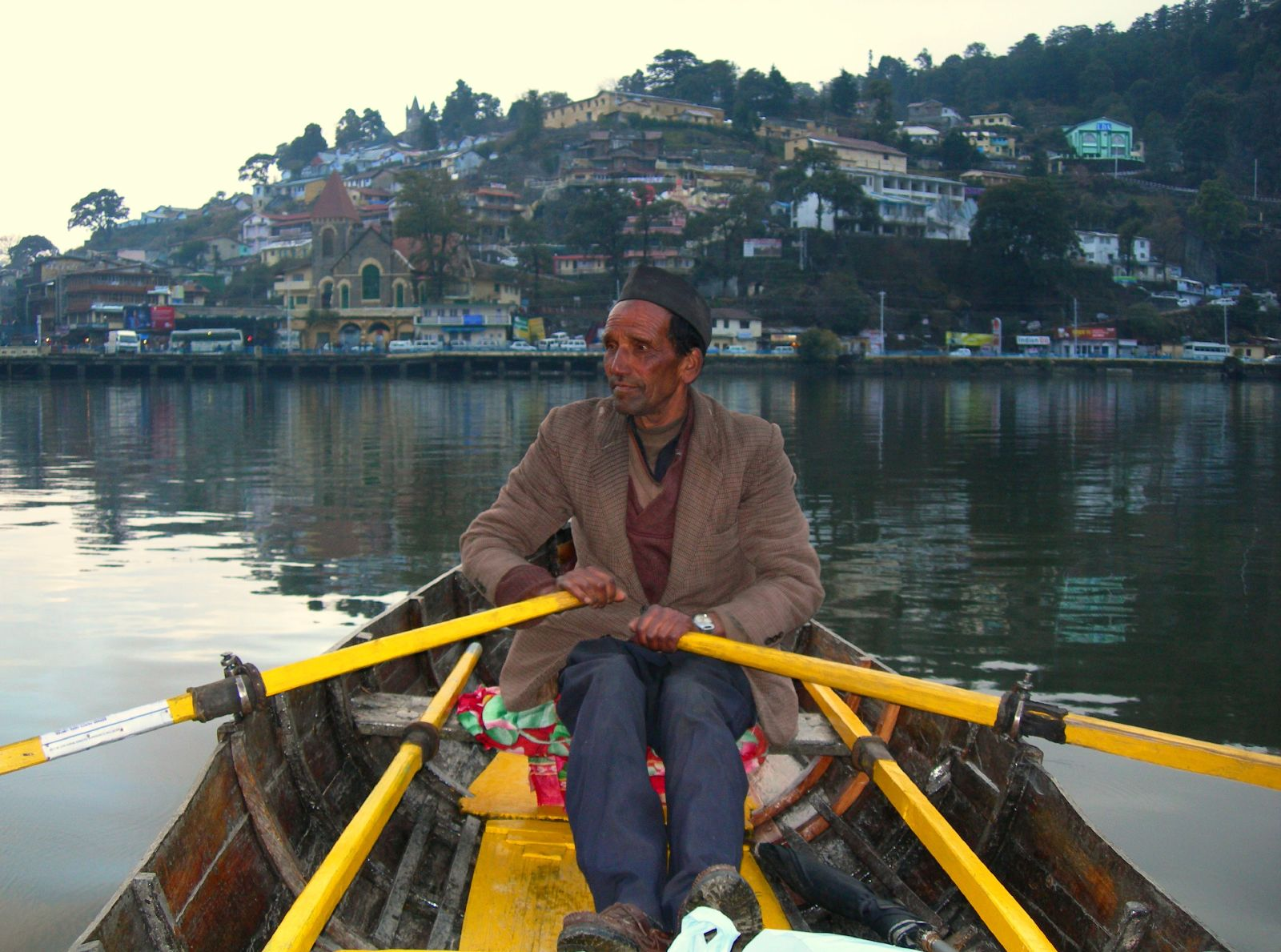
A Kumaoni man on Naini lake, Nainital City, Kumaon c. 2007

Worshipping Vishnu and Shiva is predominant in this region. According to Skanda Purana. Kumaon is believed to be the birth place of Kurma avatar of Hindu god Vishnu.

=== Kurmanchal Kingdom ===
The Kurmanchal kingdom was a medieval kingdom of Kumaon. it was established by Vasudeo Katyuri. Its capital was Baijnath. It was one of the oldest Himalayan kingdoms, unified most of the Himalayas, and extended from Sikkim in the east to Kumaon in the west at its peak. After the fall of the kingdom, it was divided into eight princely states. The next ruling clan of Kumaon were the Chands. The dynasty at its peak controlled the Tons to the Karnail river. Kumaon was one of the few countries of South Asia that were never ruled or conquered by any Muslim dynasties.

=== British Raj ===
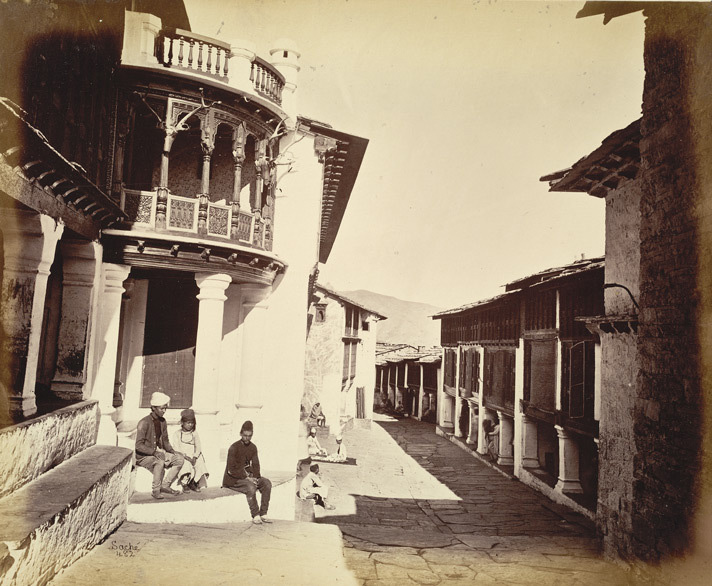
Almora Bazaar, c1860

There was widespread opposition to British rule in various parts of Kumaon. The Kumaoni people, especially from the Champawat District, rose in rebellion against the British during the Indian Rebellion of 1857 under the leadership of Kalu Singh Mahara. Many Kumaonis also joined the Indian National Army led by Subash Chandra Bose during the Second World War.

=== In other countries ===
In Nepal there are castes of Brahmins who migrated from Kumaon to Nepal during the medieval period. They are now characterized as 'Kumain Bahun' or 'Kumai Bahuns'.

== Language ==
UNESCO designated Kumaoni as language in the endangered and unsafe category which requires consistent conservation efforts.

== Culture ==
=== Traditional attire ===
Various attires are worn in Kumaon.

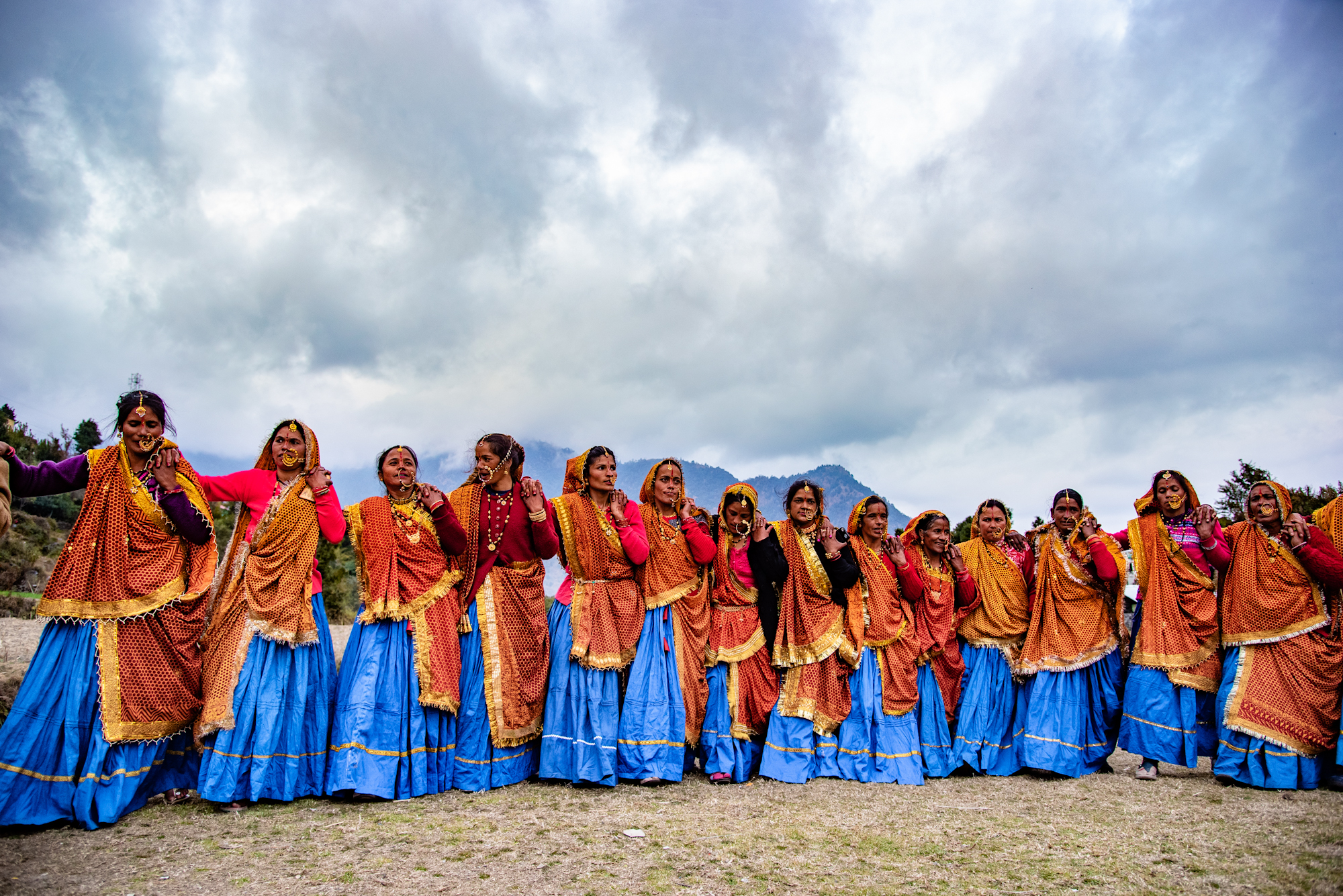
Kumaoni women from Danpur performing Chanchari wearing the traditional Kumaoni pichaura(yellow-saffron colour)

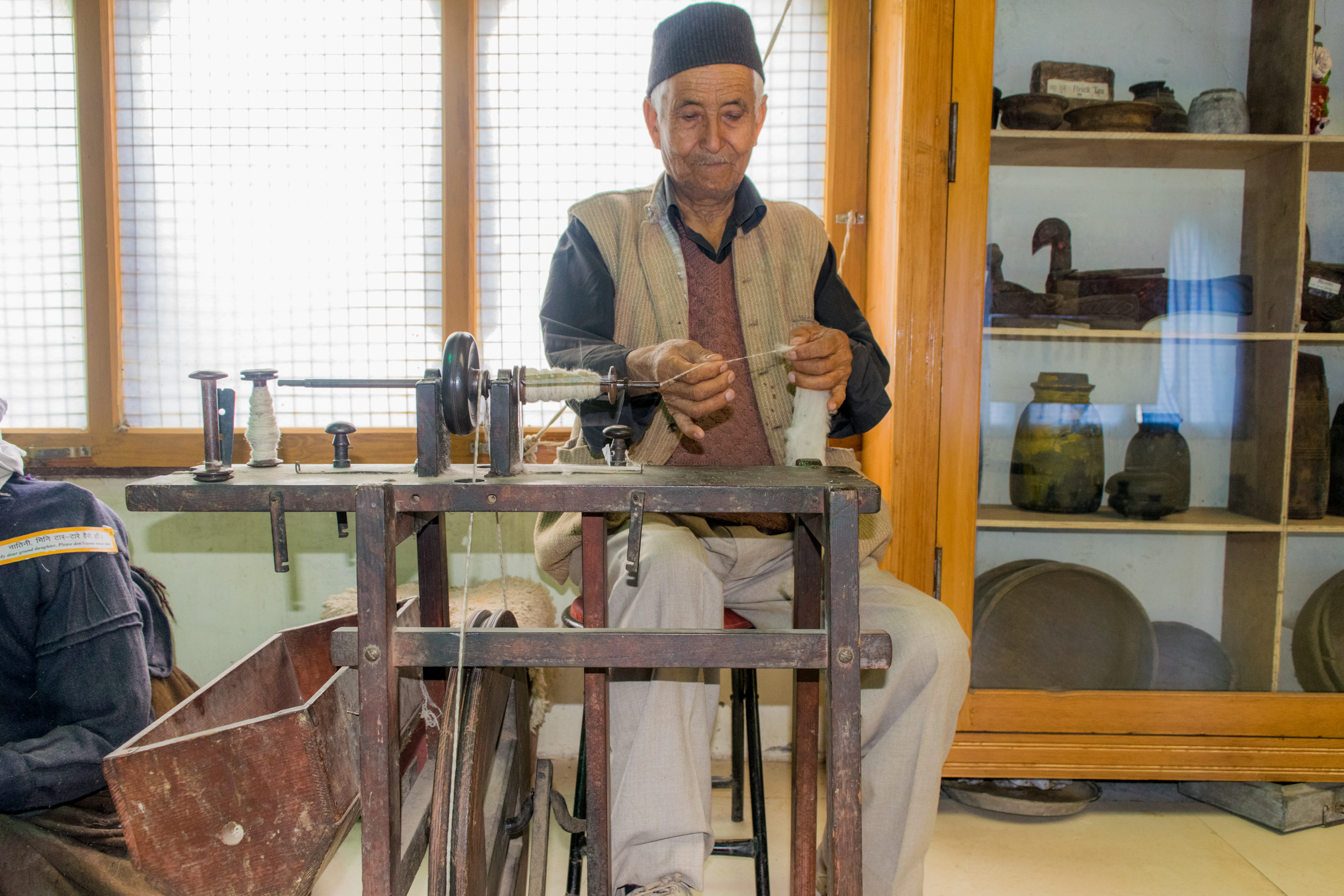
A man wearing Kumaoni cap in Munsiyari

Pichhaura is a traditional attire of Kumaoni women, generally worn for religious occasions, marriage, and other rituals. Traditionally handmade using vegetable dyes, pichhauras are available in red and saffron. Local designs made in Almora, Haldwani and other parts of Kumaon use silk and accessories made of pearl. It is now made using machines.

Kumaoni men wear the black Kumaoni cap. White Kumaoni caps are worn during festivals, especially, during Kumaoni Holi.

=== Festivals ===
After harvesting season people mostly relax, rejoice, dance and sing, and thus a festival is generated. At the transition of the sun from one constellation to another Sankranti is observed. Each Sankranti has a fair or festival connected to it somewhere in Kumaon. Fooldeyi, Bikhauti, Harela, Ghee Sankranti, Khatarua, Ghughutiya are the most-observed Sankranties throughout the region. Other festivals have the bearings in the moon and thus the dates change frequently in the Gregorian Calendar. Basant Panchami, Shiv Ratri, Saton–Athon, Kumauni Holi, Uttarayani, Samvatsar Parwa, Ram Navami, Dashra, Batsavitri, Rakshabandhan, Janmastmi, Nandastmi, and Deepawali are some of the auspicious occasions.

==== Dashain or Vijaydashmi ====
Dasshera festival starts in Kumaon with the performance of Ramlila, which is itself unique as it is based on the musical rendering of the katha or story of Rama based on the theatrical traditions set by Uday Shankar while on his stay in Almora. These traditions were further enriched by Mohan Upreti and Brijendra Lal Sah. Known as the Almora or Kumaon style, Ramlila has been recognised by UNESCO as one of the representative styles of Ramlila in India. The 150-year-old Kumaoni Ramlila was declared as the longest running opera in the world by UNESCO.

=== Folk dances ===
Chholiya is popular dance in Kumaon region. It is the oldest folk-dance of Uttarakhand. Jhoda and Chanchari are other folk dances of Kumaon.

=== Theatre ===
Kumaoni theatre, which developed through its 'Ramleela' plays, later evolved into a modern theatre form through the efforts of theatre stalwarts like Mohan Upreti and Dinesh Pandey and groups like 'Parvatiya Kala Kendra' (started by Mohan Upreti) and 'Parvatiya Lok Kala Manch'. Besides this the famous Hindi poet, Sumitranandan Pant also hailed from Kausani, district Bageshwar.

=== Radio ===
- Trans World Radio (USA) – 7320 Hz (Shortwave)

=== Cuisine ===
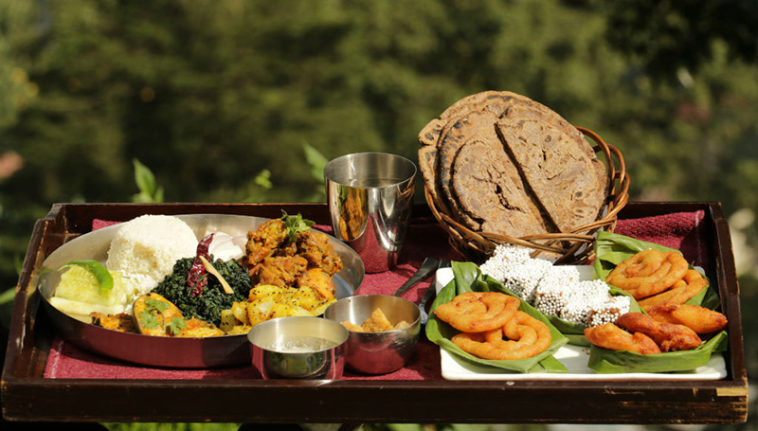
Traditional kumaoni meal with various food items

Kumaoni food is simple and comprises largely of vegetables and pulses. Vegetables like potato (aaloo), radish (mooli), colocacia leaves (arbi ke patte, papad), pumpkin (kaddoo), spinach (palak) and many others are grown locally by the largely agrarian populace and consumed in various forms.

== Population ==
In 2011, the census reported a total of 2,081,057 Kumaoni speaker in India, constituting 0.17% of the country's population.

=== In Kumaon ===
As per 2011 Indian census, there were 1,981,062 (95.19%) Kumaoni speakers in the Kumaon division.

=== Kumaoni diaspora ===
There is a large Kumaoni diaspora in other states as well as outside India. However, due to the usage and acceptance of Hindi as their mother tongue, many Kumaonis do not list the Kumaoni language as their mother tongue. Hence there is an absence of data number of ethnic Kumaonis living outside Kumaon.

==== Kumaoni speakers in other Indian states ====
State	Kumaoni speakers(2011)	Percentage of Kumaoni Population
Delhi	32674	1.57%
Garhwal	30224	1.4%
Uttar Pradesh	11059	0.53%
Haryana	4427	0.21%
Maharashtra	3582	0.17%
Rajasthan	3223	0.15%
Punjab	2560	0.09%
Jammu and Kashmir	2096	0.1%
Himachal Pradesh	1746	0.08%
Gujarat	1284	0.061%
Madhya Pradesh	1133	0.054%
Manipur	1127	0.0541%
Chandigarh	1076	0.0517%

==== International diaspora ====
There is a large Kumaoni diaspora in neighbouring Nepal, because of Katyuri and Kumaon Kingdom. The actual speakers of Kumaoni in other countries, however, are not known. Though there is a presence of Kumaoni speakers outside India and Nepal, especially in Western countries. The Kumaoni NRIs are again returning to their culture with more awareness and concern about its importance and survival.

== See also ==
- Kumaoni (disambiguation)
- Maneaters of Kumaon
- Kumaon Regiment
- Garhwali people
