= Kumai (surname) =

Kumai is a Japanese surname. Notable people with the surname include:

- Candice Kumai, American author and chef
- Kei Kumai (熊井 啓, 1930 – 2007), Japanese film director
- Kouhei Kumai (熊井 幸平, born 1990), Japanese actor
- Motoko Kumai (熊井 統子, born 1970), Japanese voice actress
- Shunichi Kumai (熊井 俊一), Japanese football player
- Yurina Kumai (熊井 友理奈, born 1993), Japanese idol singer (Berryz Kobo)
