= Coolie-Begar movement =

Movement

The Coolie-Begar or Coolie- Utar movement was a non-violent movement by the general public of Kumaun in the Bageshwar town of United Provinces in 1921. This movement was led by Hargovind Pant and Badri Datt Pandey, who were awarded the titles of 'Jannayak' and 'Kumaon Kesari' respectively after the success of this movement. The aim of this movement was to put pressure on the British to end the practice of Coolie-Begar. Mahatma Gandhi, while praising the movement, named it 'Bloodless Revolution'.

== Introduction and reasons ==
‘Coolie Begar’ or ' Coolie-Utar' referred to the law requiring locals of the hill regions of Kumaun to provide free transportation for the luggage of travelling British officials. It was the responsibility of the 'Village Head' of different villages, to make available a certain number of coolies for a certain period. For this work, there was a regular register, in which the names of all the villagers were written and everyone was forced to do this work alternately.

The dissatisfaction between the public, due to the collusion of the Village Heads, the landlords and the patwaris, and the discrimination between the people increased as the head and patwari of the village started promoting this virtue to get rid of their personal interests. Sometimes, people were also forced to do extremely disgusting things. Such as picking up garbage or washing clothes for the British etc. The locals were being exploited by the British physically and mentally. Eventually, people started to unite to protest against this.

== History ==
The Chand rulers, during their reign, initiated a tax related to horses in the state. It was possibly the earliest form of the 'Coolie Begar' exploitation. This practice took a widespread form of governance under the rule of Gorkhas. Though the British ended it initially, they gradually not only re-enforced this system, but brought it to its formidable form. Earlier this was not on the general public, but on those salaried farmers who used to collect tax from the landowners or collectors. Hence, this practice directly influenced those tenants who owned land. But the reality was that these rich landlords and jurists had imposed their parts of slavery on landless farmers, laborers and weak sections of society who accepted it as conditional remuneration. Thus, this practice continued, despite the opposition of local people.

== Background ==
During the Indian Rebellion of 1857, Haldwani, that was the gateway to the Kumaon area, was seized by the rebels of Rohilkhand. Though the British succeeded in crushing the rebellion in its infancy itself, the tension of suppression of that time sporadically flared into different forms of resistance from time to time. There was also a dissatisfaction with the British's exploitation of the forests of Kumaon.

Coolie Begar was made mandatory for the residents of Kumaon division in 1913. It was opposed everywhere; Badri Datt Pandey led the movement in Almora, while other leaders like Anusuya Prasad Bahuguna and Pt. Govind Ballabh Pant also played an active role in the Movement in Garhwal and Kashipur respectively. Through his Almora Akhbar, Badri Datt Pandey started protesting against this evil. In 1920, the annual Convention of the Congress was held in Nagpur. several leaders including Pt Govind Ballabh Pant, Badri Datt Pandey, Hargovind Pant, Victor Mohan Joshi, Shyam Lal Shah etc. attended the session, to take the blessings of Mahatma Gandhi for the Coolie Begar movement. When they came back, they started raising awareness against this evil.

== Movement ==
On 14 January 1921, on occasion of the Uttarayani fair, this movement was initiated from the grounds of Confluence (Bagad) of Saryu and Gomati. Before the commencement of this movement, a notice was issued by the District Magistrate to Hargovind Pant, Lala Chiranjilal and Badri Datt Pandey, but it had no effect on them. To participate in this movement, people from different villages came out to the fair ground, and turned it into a huge show. The people first went to the Bagnath Temple to offer prayers, and then about 40 Thousand people went to Saryu Bagad, in front of the procession carrying a flag, with the words "End the Coolie Begar". After that, there was a meeting in Saryu Ground, Badri Datt Pandey, while addressing the gathering, took an oath saying, "Taking the water of the sacred Saryu, and with the Bagnath temple as a witness, we pledge that we will not tolerate 'Coolie Utar', 'Coolie Begar' and 'Coolie Burdayash' any more." All the people took this oath and the Village heads who had brought the 'record registers' with them, flung these registers into the confluence while raising slogans in praise of Bharat Mata.

The then deputy commissioner of Almora district was also present in the crowd. Though he wanted to open fire on the crowd, he had to step back due to the lack of police force.

== Aftermath ==
After the success of this movement, people gave the title of 'Jannayak' to Hargovind Pant and that of 'Kumaon Kesari' to Badri Datt Pandey. People not only supported the movement but also strictly followed it and continued to protest against this practice. The result was that the government was forced to end the tradition by bringing a bill in the House. Mahatma Gandhi was very impressed with this movement and paid a visit to Bageshwar and Kausani himself in 1929. He also established a Gandhi Ashram in Chanunda. After this, Gandhiji wrote about this movement in Young India stating "its effect was complete, it was a bloodless revolution."
