= Makar Sankranti =

Hindu festival that reveres Surya (sun god)

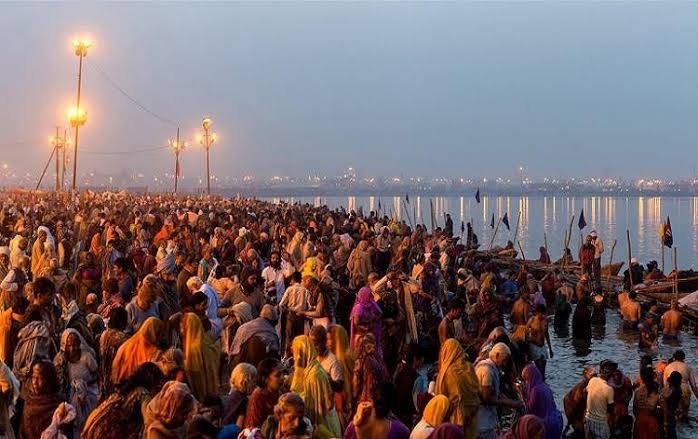
- Holy dip by devotees in river Ganga on the occasion of Makar Sankranti
- Also called: Uttarayana; Sankranti; Til Sakraat; Magha; Môkôr Sôṅkrānti; Mela; Ghughuti; Pedda Panduga; Bhogi; Sakraat; Pongal; Peddha Panduga; Sakrat; Khichaṛi; Sankramana
- Observed by: Hindus, Buddhists, Sikhs, Jains
- Liturgical color: Red
- Type: Religious and cultural, harvest festival
- Significance: A harvest festival, a celebration of the mid-winter solstice
- Celebrations: Kite flying, bonfires, fairs, feast, arts, dance, socialization
- Date: First day of makara masa, Bhogi (15 January in leap years; 14 January on all other years)
- Frequency: Annual
- Related to: Pongal, Lohri, Lal Loi, Maghe Sankranti, Magh Bihu, Tusu Festival, Mela Maghi

Makar(a) Sankrānti (Sanskrit: मकरसङ्क्रान्ति, romanized: Makarasaṅkrānti; transl. Capricorn Festival) also referred to as Uttarāyana, Makara, or simply Sankrānti, is a Hindu observance and a mid-winter harvest festival in India and Nepal. Hindus worship Surya, the Sun god, in Makara Sankranti. It is typically celebrated on 14 January annually (15 January in a leap year). This occasion marks the transition of the sun from the zodiac of Sagittarius (dhanu) to Capricorn (makara). As this transition coincides with the sun's movement from south to north, the festival is dedicated to the solar deity, Surya, and is observed to mark a new beginning. Across India, the occasion is celebrated with numerous multi-day festivals.

The festivities associated with Makar Sankranti are known by various names including Sankranthi or Peddha Panduga in Andhra Pradesh and Telangana, Khichari in Bhojpuri region, Magh Bihu in Assam, Maghi Saaji in Himachal Pradesh, Makaravilakku in Kerala, Makara sankranti in Karnataka, Maghi Sangrand in Punjab, Pongal in Tamil Nadu, Maghi Sangrand or Uttarain (Uttarayana) in Jammu, Sakrat in Haryana, Sakraat in Rajasthan, Sukarat in central India, Uttarayana in Gujarat and Uttar Pradesh, Ghughuti in Uttarakhand, Dahi Chura in Bihar, Makar Sankranti in Odisha, Jharkhand, Maharashtra, Goa, West Bengal (also called Poush Sankranti or Mokor Sonkranti), Uttar Pradesh (also called Khichidi Sankranti), Uttarakhand (also called Uttarayani) or as simply, Maghe Sankranti (Nepal), Songkran (Thailand), Thingyan (Myanmar), Mohan Songkran (Cambodia), Til Sakraat in Mithila, and Shishur Senkrath (Kashmir). On Makar Sankranti, Surya (Hindu solar deity) is worshipped along with Vishnu and goddess Lakshmi throughout India.

Makar Sankranti is observed with social festivities such as colourful decorations, rural children going house to house, singing and asking for treats in some areas, melas (fairs), dances, kite flying, bonfires and feasts. The Magha Mela is mentioned in the Hindu epic Mahabharata. Many observers go to sacred rivers or lakes and bathe in a ceremony of thanks to the Sun. Every twelve years, the Hindus observe Makar Sankranti with Kumbha Mela – one of the world's largest mass pilgrimage, with an estimated 60 to 100 million people attending the event. At this event, they say a prayer to the Sun and bathe at the Prayagaraj confluence of the River Ganga and River Yamuna, a tradition attributed to Adi Shankaracharya. Makar Sankranti is a time of celebration and thanks giving, and is marked by a variety of rituals and tradition.

== Etymology ==
The term Makara Sankranti is derived from Sanskrit. Makara refers to the zodiac sign Capricorn, while sankranti denotes "transmigration" or "transition," specifically the movement of the sun from one zodiac sign (rashi) to another. Thus, Makara Sankranti literally means "the transition of the Sun into Capricorn." Within Hindu astronomical calendars, sankranti marks the beginning of a new solar cycle.

=== Other names ===
==== Uttarayana ====
The festival is also colloquially called Uttarayana, from uttara ("north") and ayana ("movement" or "journey"), meaning "northward movement." It refers to the northward shift of the Sun following the winter solstice. However, this usage should not be confused with Uttarayana in its astronomical sense, which denotes the six-month northward movement of the Sun rather than the specific festival day.

==== Pongal ====
In Tamil Nadu, the festival is known as Pongal, from the Tamil verb pongu, meaning "to boil over" or "overflow." The name refers to the traditional dish of newly harvested rice boiled with milk and jaggery, that is ritually prepared and consumed on the day. It is also referred to as Tamizhar thirunal ("the festival of Tamil people").

==== Magh Bihu ====
In Assam, it is celebrated as Magh Bihu or Bhogali Bihu. The term Magh refers to the corresponding month in the Hindu calendar, while bhogali derives from the Sanskrit bhoga ("feasting" or "enjoyment"). The term Bihu is traced to the Sanskrit Bisuvan or Bisuva, with mentions in the Atharva Veda and the Vishnu Purana. It is believed to be the sanskritisation of the Tai-Ahom term Poi-hu (from Poi meaning worship, and Hu meaning cow), which evolved phonetically into Bihu.

==== Lohri ====
In parts of northern India, especially Punjab, the festival preceding Makara Sankranti is known as Lohri. The etymology of "Lohri" is debated. Some scholars associate it with loh (iron) or lohri as a term linked to winter fires or ironsmiths. It is colloquially also referred to as the "younger sister of Holi". According to another tradition, the term is derived from Loi, the name of Sant Kabir's wife.

==== Khichdi ====
In regions such as Uttar Pradesh and Bihar, the festival is colloquially called Khichdi, named after the traditional dish made of rice and lentils. There is a ritualistic practice of offering Khichdi to Guru Gorakhnath on the occasion of Makar Sankranti.

== Astronomical basis ==
UT date and time of equinoxes and solstices on Earth, IST date and time of Makar Sankranti
event	equinox		solstice		equinox		solstice		Makar Sankranti	
month	March		June		September		December		January	
year	day	time	day	time	day	time	day	time	day(IST)	time (IST)
2021	20	09:37	21	03:32	22	19:21	21	15:59	14	08:14
2022	20	15:33	21	09:14	23	01:04	21	21:48	14	14:28
2023	20	21:25	21	14:58	23	06:50	22	03:28	14	20:43
2024	20	03:07	20	20:51	22	12:44	21	09:20	15	02:42
2025	20	09:02	21	02:42	22	18:20	21	15:03	14	08:54
2026	20	14:46	21	08:25	23	00:06	21	20:50	14	15:05
2027	20	20:25	21	14:11	23	06:02	22	02:43	14	21:09
2028	20	02:17	20	20:02	22	11:45	21	08:20	15	03:22
2029	20	08:01	21	01:48	22	17:37	21	14:14	14	09:25
2030	20	13:51	21	07:31	22	23:27	21	20:09	14	15:33
2031	20	19:41	21	13:17	23	05:15	22	01:56	14	21:50

Makar Sankranti is set by the solar cycle and corresponds to the exact time astronomical event of the Sun entering Capricorn and is observed on a day that usually falls on 14 January of the Gregorian calendar, but on 15 January in leap years. Makar Sankranti's date and time is analogous to Sidereal time of Zodiac sign of Capricorn (when sun enters).

The year is 365.24 days long and the time difference between the two consecutive instances of Makar Sankranti is almost the same as the year. There are 365 days in a year. Thus, every four years the calendar is offset by one day which is adjusted by adding leap day (29 February). Hence, Makar Sankranti falls on 15 January every leap year. Sidereal time of sign of Capricorn also shifts by a day due to leap year. Similarly, the time of equinoxes also shifts by a day in each four year window. For example, the equinox of September does not fall on the same date each year nor does the winter solstice. Any event related to one revolution of the Earth around the Sun will have this date shift within a four-year cycle. Similar changes can be seen in the exact time of solstices and equinoxes. See the table, how the time of the equinox and a solstice increases and decreases in a cycle of four years.

The time difference between two consecutive winter solstices is about 5 hours 49 minutes 59 seconds, with respect to winter solstice time, and the time difference between two consecutive Mankar Sankranti is about 6 hours and 10 minutes. Towards the end of the 21st century, there will be more occurrences of Makar Sankranti on 15 January in a four-year cycle. And Makar Sankranti will be on 16 January for the first in the year 2102 as 2100 will not be a leap year.

=== Makar Sankranti and Uttar Ayana ===
Makar Sankranti is celebrated when the Sun's ecliptic longitude becomes 270° measured from a fixed starting point which is in opposition to Spica, i.e. this is a sidereal measure. Uttarayana begins when the Sun's ecliptic longitude becomes 270° measured from the Vernal equinox, (Note: This is the same as saying "when the Sun reaches the December solstice point") i.e. this is a tropical measure. While both concern a measure of 270° their starting points are different. Hence, Makar Sankranti and Uttarayana occur on different days. On the Gregorian calendar, Makar Sankranti occurs on 14 or 15 January; Uttarayana starts on 21 December.

Due to the precession of the equinoxes the tropical zodiac (i.e. all the equinoxes and solstices) shifts by about 1° in 72 years. As a result, the December solstice (Uttarayana) is continuously but very slowly moving away from Makar Sankranti. Conversely, the December solstice (Uttarayana) and Makar Sankranti must have coincided at some time in the distant past. Such a coincidence last happened 1700 years back, in 291 CE.

== Legends ==
According to Hindu Puranic legends, Makar Sankranti is named after the goddess Sankranti, who defeated the demon Sankarasura. The demon's death marked the occasion of Makara Sankranti. Another demon named Kinkarasura was slain by the goddess on the following day, which is celebrated as "Kinkrant". According to another legend, Surya, the solar deity, visited his son Shani on Makar Sankranti. Though the father and son were described as having a strained relationship, Shani welcomed Surya to his home by offering black sesame seeds (til).

Sesame (til), one of the most important ritual foods of Makar Sankranti, is also connected with several sacred legends. One account states that when Vishnu became enraged at Hiranyakashipu for persecuting his devotee Prahlada, sweat from Vishnu's body fell on the earth and turned into sesame seeds. According to another legend, Vishnu's sweat transformed into sesame during the Samudra Manthana (churning of the ocean). Because sesame emerged from Vishnu's body, it came to be regarded as sacred and ritually pure.

== Regional variations and customs ==
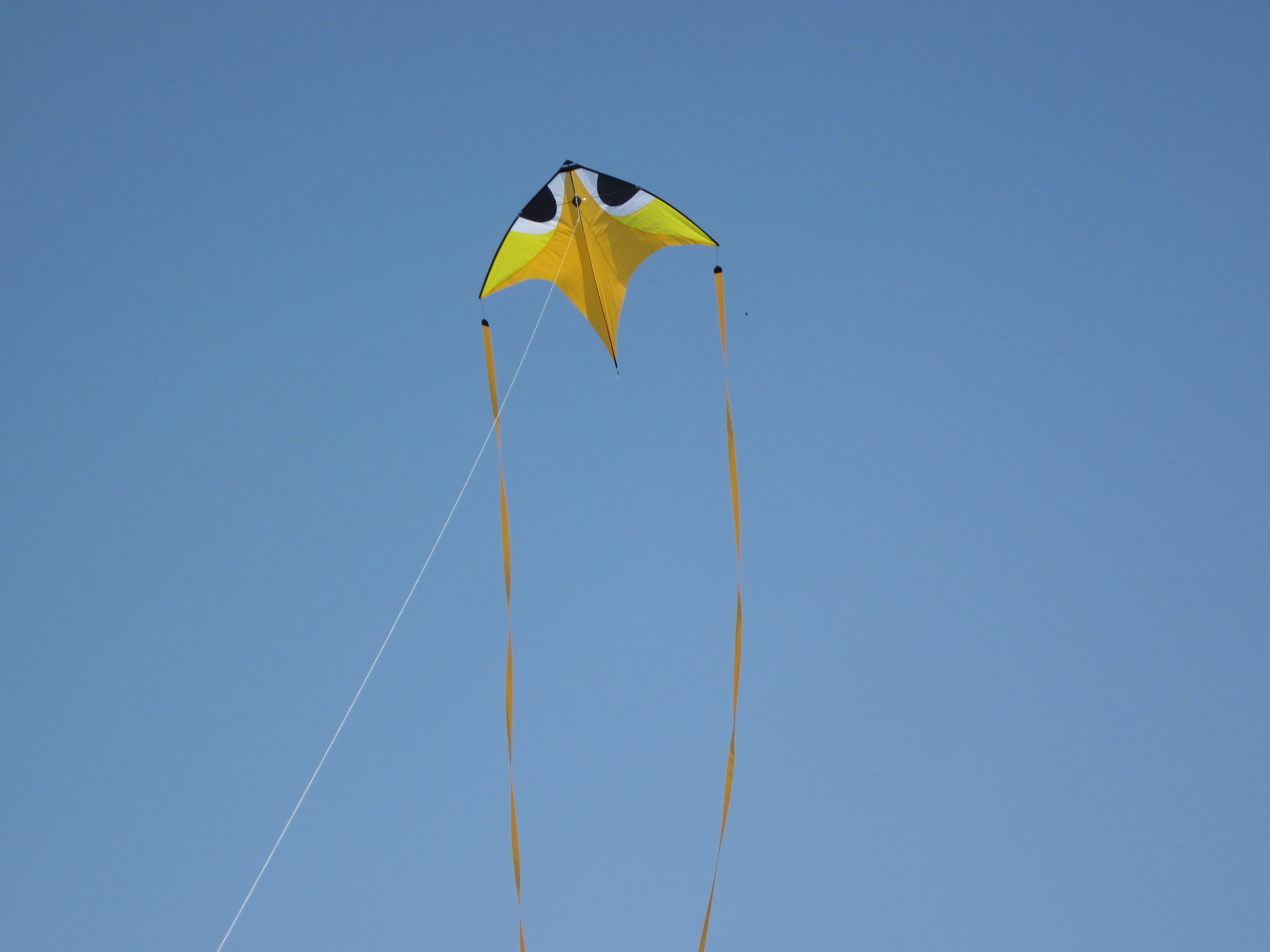
Kite flying is a tradition of Makar Sankranti in many parts of India.

Makara Sankranti is an important pan-Indian solar festival, known by different names though observed on the same date, sometimes for multiple dates around the Makar Sankranti. It is known as Pedda Panduga'/'Makara Sankranti in Andhra Pradesh, Makara Sankranti in Karnataka, Telangana, and Maharashtra, Pongal in Tamil Nadu, Magh Bihu in Assam, Magha Mela in parts of central and north India, as Makar Sankranti in the west, Makara Sankranti or Shankaranti in Kerala, and by other names.

Many melas or fairs are held on Makar Sankranti the most famous being the Kumbha Mela, held every 12 years at one of four holy locations, namely Haridwar, Prayag (Prayagraj), Ujjain and Nashik, the Magha Mela (or mini-Kumbh Mela held annually at Prayag) and the Gangasagar Mela (held at the head of the Ganges River, where it flows into the Bay of Bengal). Makar Mela in Odisha. Tusu Mela also called as Tusu Porab is celebrated in many parts of Jharkhand and West Bengal. Poush Mela, held traditionally on the seventh day of Poush, at Shantiniketan, in West Bengal, is unrelated to this festival. Mela Maghi is held in memory of the forty Sikh martyrs (Chalis Mukte) who gave their lives to protect Guru Gobind Singh, the tenth Guru of Sikhism, every year at Muktsar Sahib in Punjab. Before this tradition, the festival was observed and mentioned by Guru Amar Das, the third Guru of Sikhism.

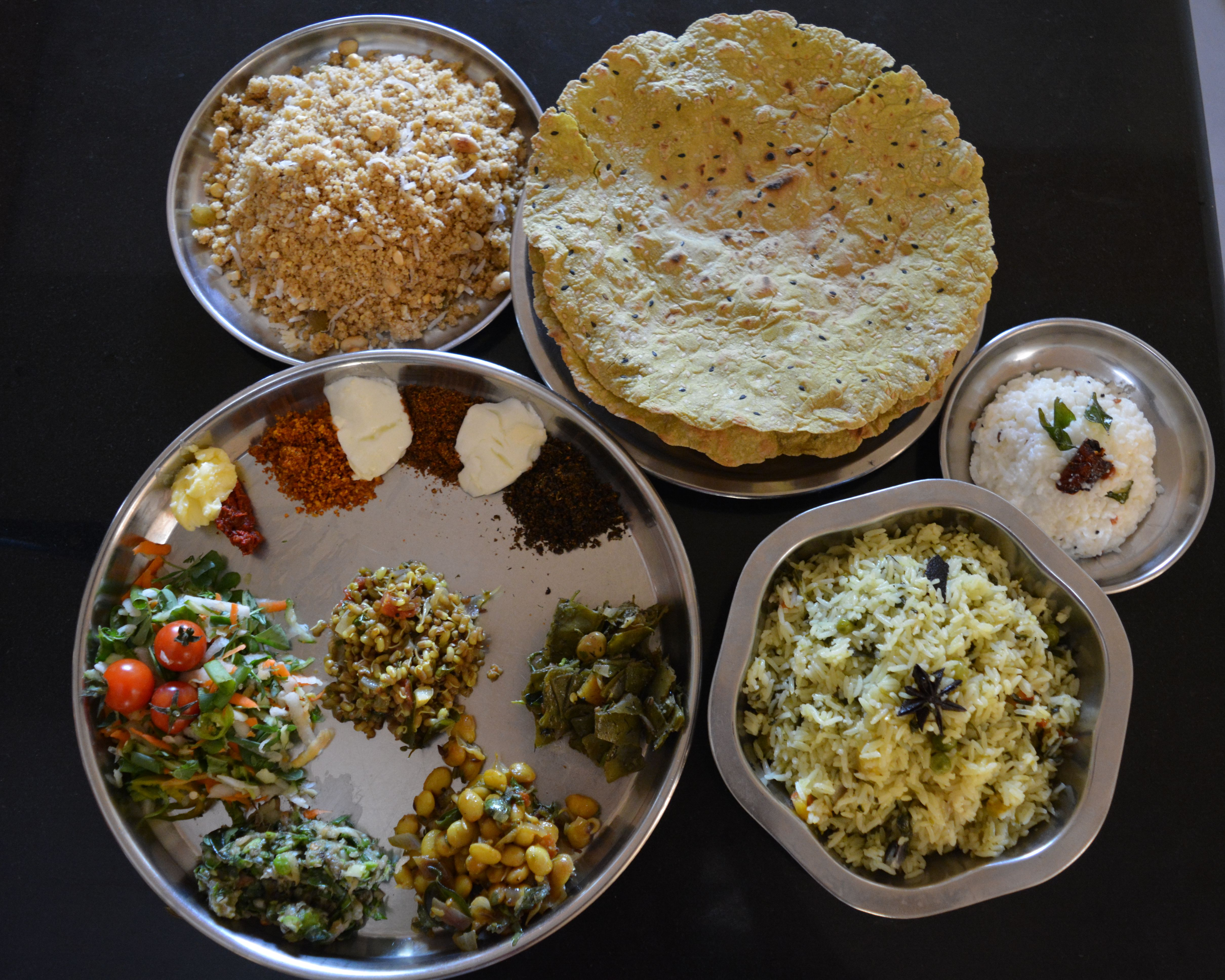
Feast of Makar Sankranti

=== Andhra Pradesh and Telangana ===
In Andhra Pradesh and Telangana, the festival of Sankranti is celebrated over four days. Entrances of homes are decorated with geometric patterns made from colored rice flour, known as Muggu. The four days are observed as Bhogi, Pedda Panduga (the main festival day), Kanuma, and Mukkanuma, respectively.

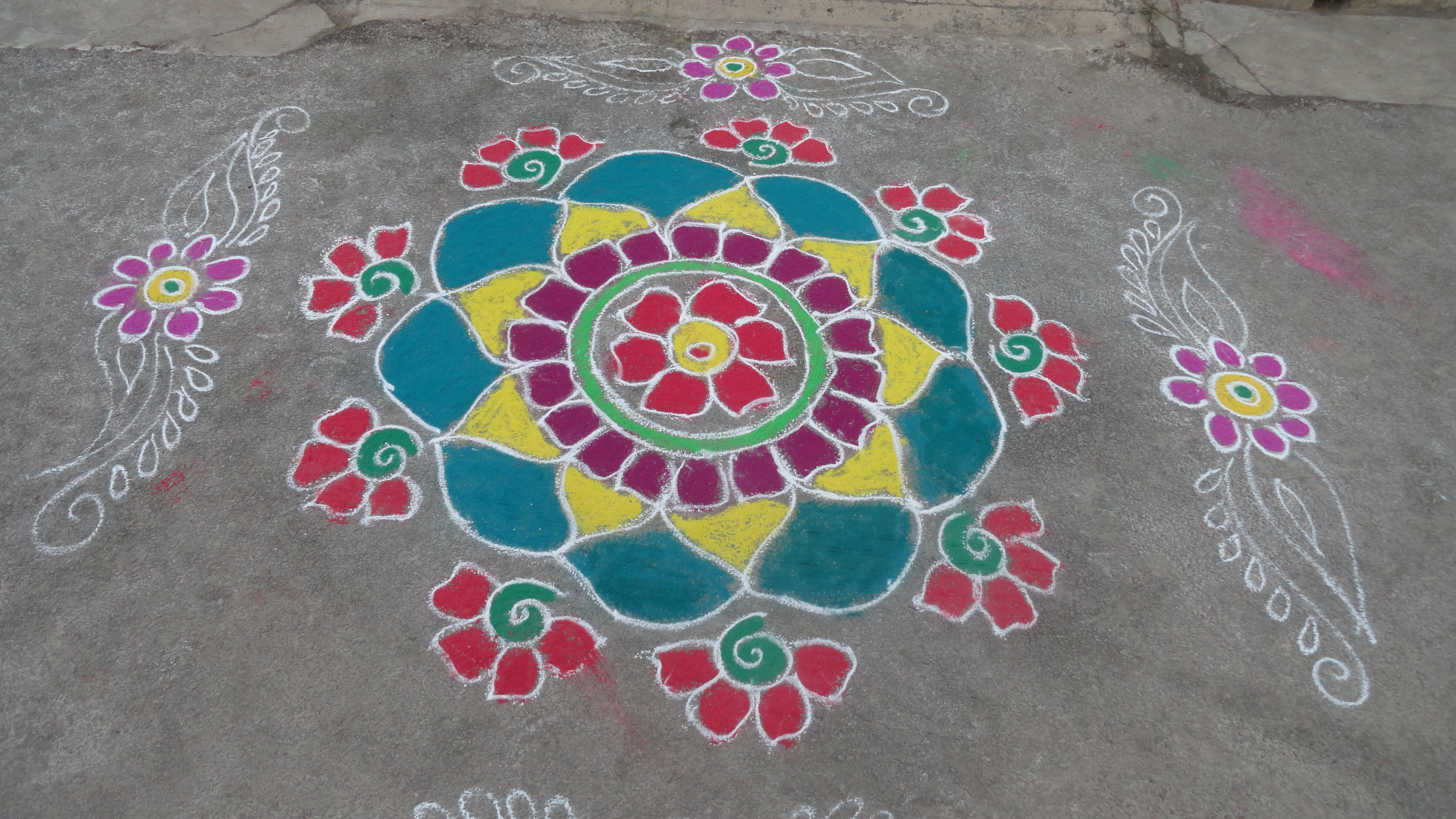
Colorful floor artwork (muggulu) decorate entrances and streets during Sankranti

=== Assam ===
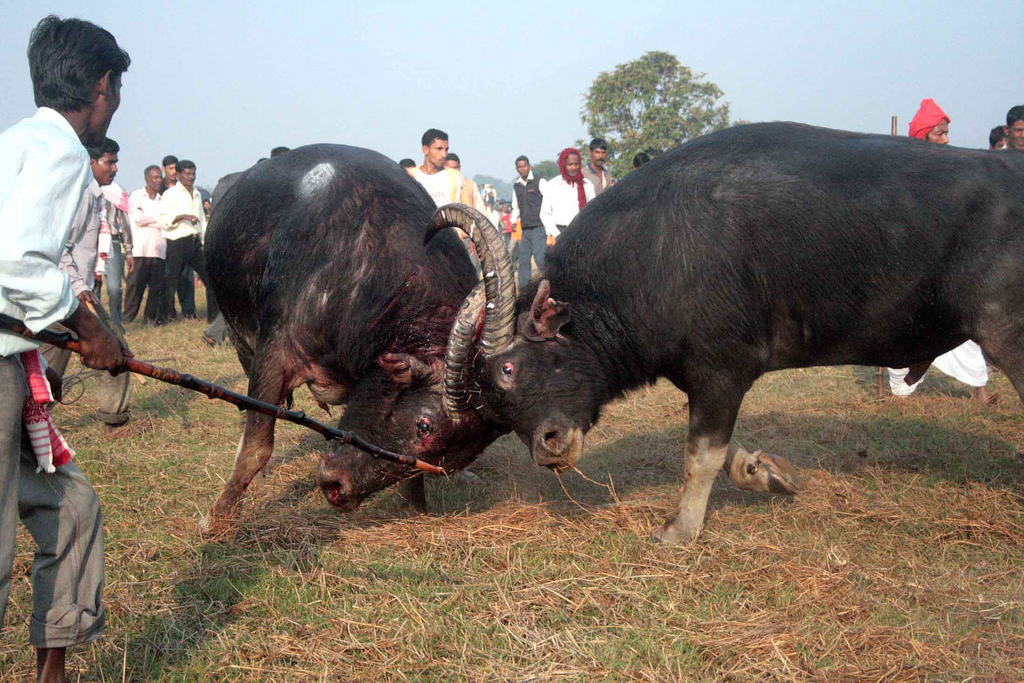
A Buffalo fight held at Ranthali, in Nagaon District of Assam, on the occasion of Magh bihu.

Magh Bihu, also called Bhogali Bihu (Bihu of eating foods and enjoyment) or Maghar Domahi is a harvest festival celebrated in Assam, India, which marks the end of harvesting season in the month of Maagha (January–February). It is the Assam celebration of Makar Sankranti, with feasting lasting for a week.

The festival is marked by feasts and bonfires. The day of the Bihu starts at early dawn by a post-harvesting ceremony called "Meji". In this, bonfires are burned in the house, temples, fields and people pray to Agnidev for blessings Young people erect makeshift huts, known as Meji and Bhelaghar, from bamboo, leaves and thatch, and in Bhelaghar they eat the food prepared for the feast, and then burn the huts the next morning. The celebrations also feature traditional Assamese games such as tekeli bhonga (pot-breaking) and buffalo fighting. Magh Bihu celebrations start on the last day of the previous month, the month of "Pooh", usually the 29th of Pooh and usually 14 January, and is the only day of Magh Bihu in modern times (earlier, the festival would last for the whole month of Magh, and so the name Magh Bihu). The night before is "Uruka" (28th of Pooh), when people gather around a bonfire, cook dinner, and make merry.

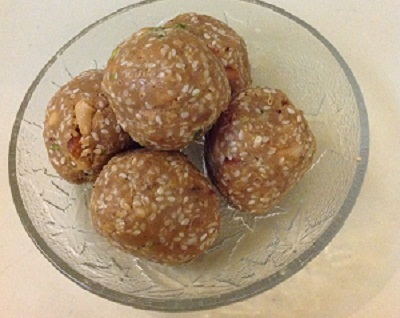
A traditional sweet sesame-jaggery based ladoo exchanged and eaten on Makar Sankranti.

=== Goa ===
Known as Sankrant in Goa and like in the rest of the country, people distribute sweets in the form of granules of sugar-coated till pulses among family members and friends. Newly married women offer five sughat or small clay pots with black beaded threads tied around them, to the deity. These pots are filled with newly harvested food grains and are offered with betel leaves and areca nut.

=== Gujarat ===
Uttarayana, as Makar Sankranti is called in Gujarati, is a major festival in the state of Gujarat which lasts for two days.

- 14 January is Uttarayana
- 15 January is Vasi-Uttarayana (Stale Uttarayana).

In Gujarat, Makar Sankranti is celebrated as Uttarayana and is associated with kite flying. People fly Rhombus shaped kites (patang), which are traditionally made of lightweight paper and bamboo. The string often contains abrasives to cut down rival kites. Undhiyu (spicy, baked mix of winter vegetables) and chikkis (made from sesame seeds, peanuts and jaggery) are eaten on this day. The Hindu Sindhi community in western regions of India, that is also found in southeastern parts of Pakistan, celebrate Makar Sankranti as Tirmoori. On this day, parents send sweet dishes to their daughters.

=== Haryana and Delhi ===
"Sakraant" in Haryana and Delhi rural areas, is celebrated with traditional Hindu rituals of North India similar to Western UP and border areas of Rajasthan and Punjab. This includes ritual purification by taking the holy dip in rivers, especially in Yamuna, or at sacred ponds such as ancient sarovars Kurukshetra and at local tirtha ponds associated with the ancestral guardian/founder deity of the village called Jathera or Dhok (dahak in Sanskrit or fire) in villages to wash away sins. People prepare kheer, churma, halva with desi ghee and distribute til-gud (sesame and jaggery) laddoos or chikkis. Brothers of married woman visits her home with a gift pack, called "Sindhara" or "Sidha", of wood and warm clothing for her and her husband's family. Women give gift to their in-laws called "Manana". Women congregate in the nearby havelis to sing Haryani folk songs and exchange gifts.

=== Jammu ===
In Jammu, Makar Sankranti is celebrated as 'Uttrain' (derived from Sanskrit: Uttarayana). Alternatively, terms 'Attrain' or 'Attrani' have also been used to describe this festival. Among the Dogras, there is a tradition of 'Mansana' (charity) of Khichdi of Maah Dal. Khichdi of Maah di Dal is also prepared on this day and that is why this day is also referred to as 'Khichdi wala Parva'. Dhagwal in Hiranagar tehsil is known for its fair on Makar Sankranti and Janamashtami. People of Jammu also take a holy bath in the Devika river and make pilgrimages to Uttar Behni and Purmandal on this occasion. Makar Sankranti is celebrated as the birth anniversary of Baba Ambo ji, a local deity of the Jammu region. At the Vasuki temple of Bhaderwah in Jammu, the idols of Vasuki Nag are covered on Magh Sankranti and they are uncovered only after three months on Vaisakha Sankranti.

=== Karnataka ===
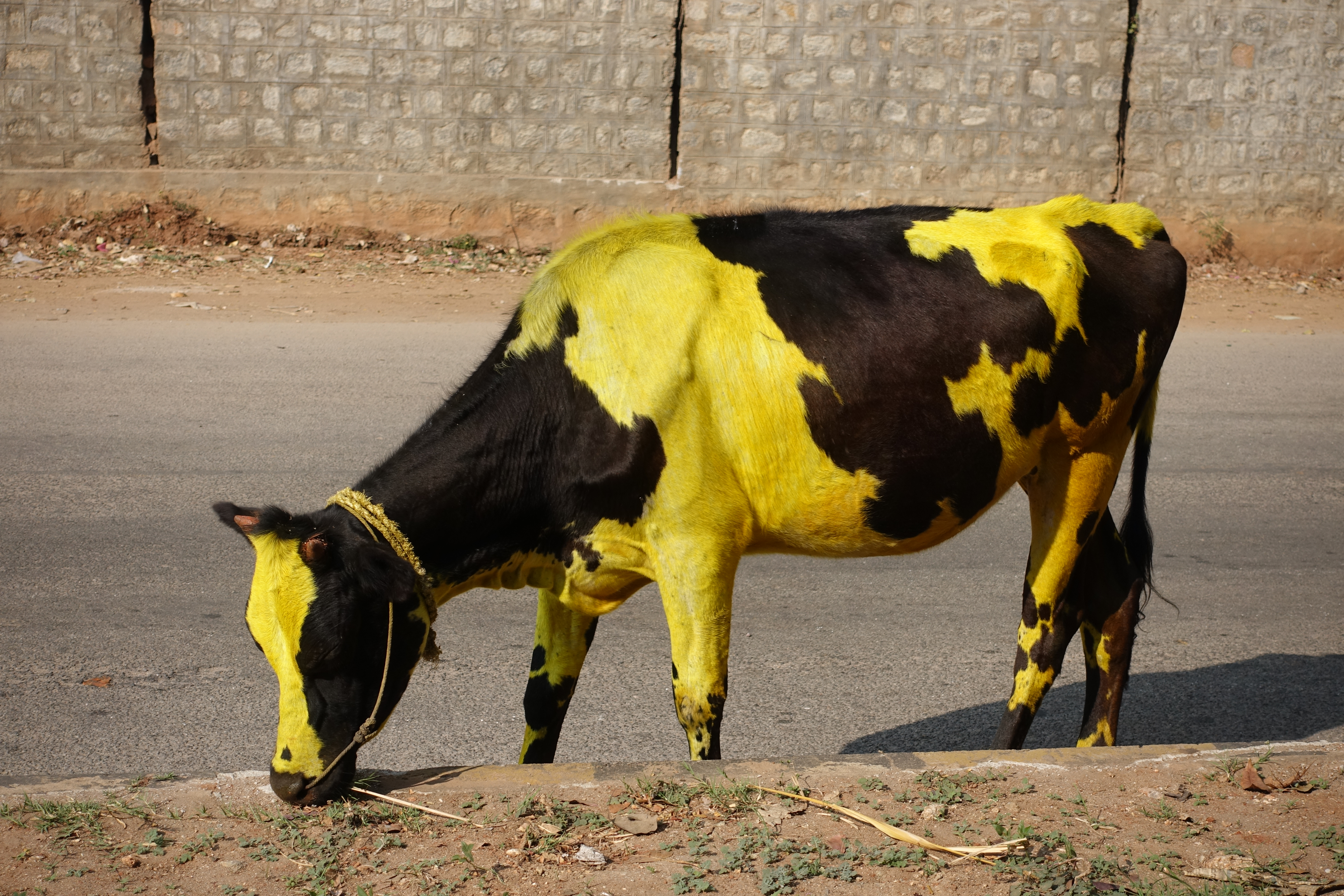
Mysuru Decorated Cows, January 2017

This is the Suggi (ಸುಗ್ಗಿ) or harvest festival for farmers of Karnataka. On this auspicious day, girls wear new clothes to visit near and dear ones with a Sankranti offering in a plate and exchange the same with other families. This ritual is called "Ellu Birodhu." Here the plate would normally contain "Ellu" (white sesame seeds) mixed with fried groundnuts, neatly cut dry coconut and fine cut bella (jaggery). The mixture is called "Ellu-Bella" (ಎಳ್ಳು ಬೆಲ್ಲ). The plate contains shaped sugar candy moulds (Sakkare Acchu, ಸಕ್ಕರೆ ಅಚ್ಚು) with a piece of sugarcane. During the occasion, newly married women give away bananas for five years to married women from the first year of her marriage.

=== Maharashtra ===
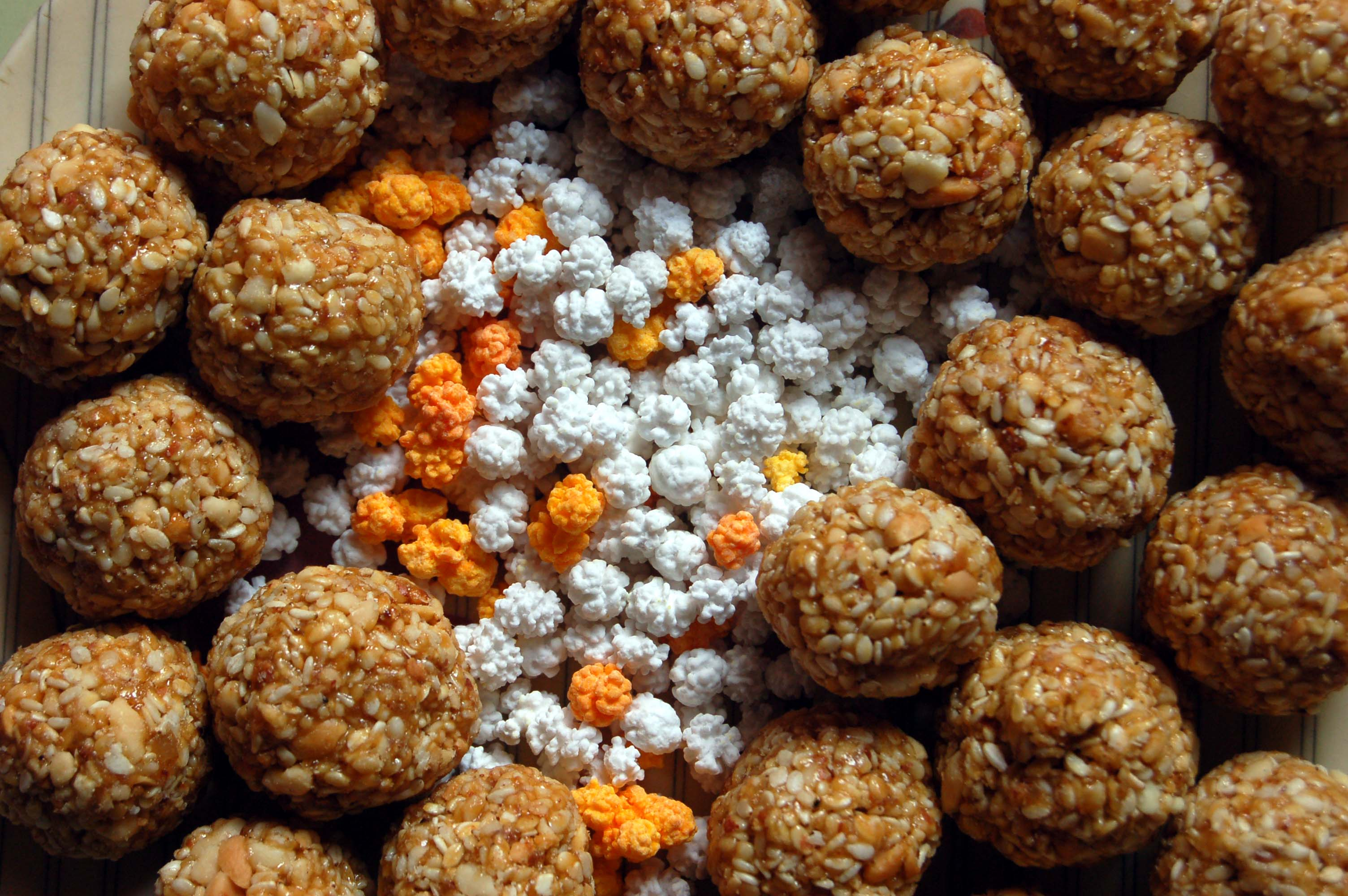
Multicolored sugar halwa surrounded by til-gul (sesame and jaggery) ladoos. These exchanged and eaten on Makar Sankranti in Maharashtra.

In Maharashtra, Makar Sankranti is celebrated by the exchange of tilgul, sweets made from sesame seeds and jaggery, accompanied by the traditional greeting "Tilgul ghya, goad goad bola" ("Accept this tilgul and speak sweetly"). In many Marathi households, foods such as gulachi poli (jaggery-filled flatbread) and sesame-based sweets are specially prepared during the festival. Wearing black clothing on Makar Sankranti is a unique regional custom. Since Sakranti falls in the winter months, wearing black keeps the body warm. This is an essential reason behind wearing black, which is otherwise barred on festival days. As per another legend, Lord Surya forgave his son Shani and his son visited him on Sankranti.

=== Odisha ===
The festival is known as Makara Sankranti in Odisha where people prepare makara chaula (Odia: ମକର ଚାଉଳ): uncooked newly harvested rice, banana, coconut, jaggery, sesame, rasagola, Khai/Liaa and chhena puddings for naivedya to gods and goddesses. The withdrawing winter entails a change in food habits and intake of nourishing and rich food. Therefore, this festival holds traditional cultural significance. It is astronomically important for devotees who worship the sun god at the great Konark temple with fervour and enthusiasm as the sun starts its annual swing northwards. According to various Indian calendars, the Sun's movement changes and the days from this day onwards become lengthier and warmer and so the Sun-God is worshiped on this day as a great benefactor. Many individuals at the start of the day perform a ritual bath while fasting. Makara Mela (Fun fair) is observed at Dhabaleswar in Cuttack, Hatakeshwar at Atri in Khordha, Makara Muni temple in Balasore and near deities in each district of Odisha. In Puri special rituals are carried out at the temple of Lord Jagannath.

=== Punjab ===
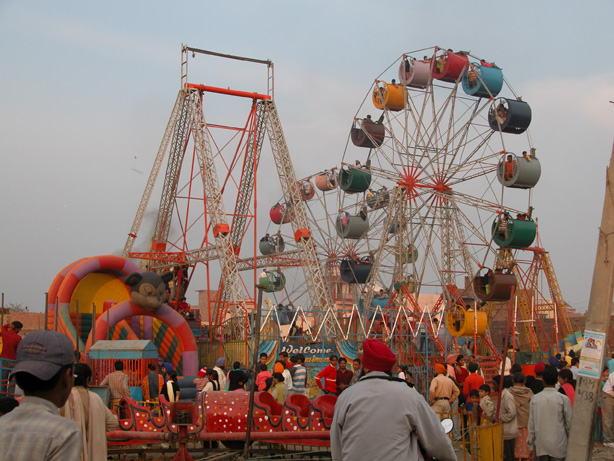
Mela

In Punjab, Makar Sankranti is celebrated as Maghi which is a religious and cultural festival. A major mela is held at Sri Muktsar Sahib on Maghi which commemorates a historical event in Sikh history.

=== Rajasthan and Western Madhya Pradesh (Malwa and Nimar) ===
"Makar Sankrati" or "Sakraat" in the Rajasthani language is one of the major festivals in the state of Rajasthan. The day is celebrated with special Rajasthani delicacies and sweets such as pheeni (either with sweet milk or sugar syrup dipped), til-patti, gajak, kheer, ghevar, pakodi, puwa, and til-laddoo. Kite flying is traditionally observed as a part of this festival, prominently in the Malwa and Nimar regions. On this occasion the sky in Jaipur and Hadoti regions is filled with kites, and youngsters engage in contests trying to cut each other's strings.

=== Tamil Nadu and Puducherry ===
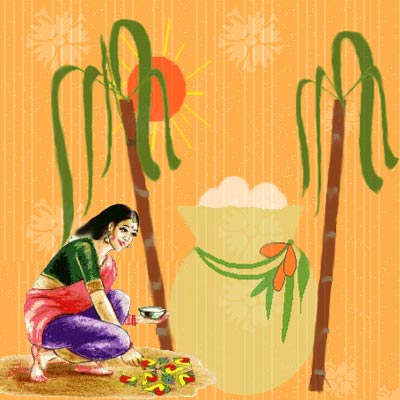
The Tamil festival of Pongal coincides with Makar Sankranti, and celebrates Surya.

Makar Sankranti is a four-day festival in Tamil Nadu, celebrated from the last day of the Tamil month of Margazhi to the third day of the month of Thai (Pausha), with each day observed as Bhogi Pandigai, Thai Pongal, Maattu Pongal, and Kaanum Pongal, respectively.

=== Kerala ===
In Kerala, Makara Sankranti is closely related with the Sabarimala Ayyappa pilgrimage season. The day marks Makara Samkrama, when the sun enters the zodiac sign of Makaram (Capricorn). At Sabarimala, thousands of devotees gather to witness the Makara Jyothi, a bright light that appears on the horizon near Ponnambalamedu. It is one of the most important moments of the pilgrimage season, and marks the conclusion of the annual Mandala-Makaravilakku worship period at the hill shrine.

=== Tripura ===
Among sections of the Tripuri community, Makar Sankranti is observed as Hangrai. Preparations typically begin two to three days in advance, including cleaning homes, washing utensils and household articles, decorating houses, and preparing traditional cakes, dishes, and drinks for relatives and communal feasts. The Hangrai Nok is a temporary bamboo-and-thatch hut constructed near ponds or water bodies by children between the ages 7–19. Construction may take five to seven days, with youths gathering thatch from paddy fields and pooling money to buy food. On the eve of the festival, they cook, feast, and remain overnight in the hut. Before dawn, the hut is ceremonially burned, after which participants bathe in nearby ponds or rivers. In some families, sons or close male relatives of deceased persons undertake pilgrimage to Dumbur (Tirthamukh), where ashes or remains of deceased parents or elders are immersed in the waters of the Gumti River.

=== Uttar Pradesh ===
The festival is known as Kicheri in Purvanchal and Awadh parts of Uttar Pradesh and involves ritual bathing. Over two million people gather at their respective sacred places for this holy bathing such as Prayagraj and Varanasi in Uttar Pradesh and Haridwar in Uttarakhand. Khichdi has a special prominence on this day, hence the vernacular name of the Festival.

=== Uttarakhand ===
Makar Sankranti is a popular festival in Uttarakhand. It known by various names in the different parts of the state such as Uttarayani, Khichri Sangrand, Pusyodia, Ghughutia, Ghughuti Tyar, Kale Kauva, Makrain, Makraini, Gholda, Gwalda and Chunyatyar.

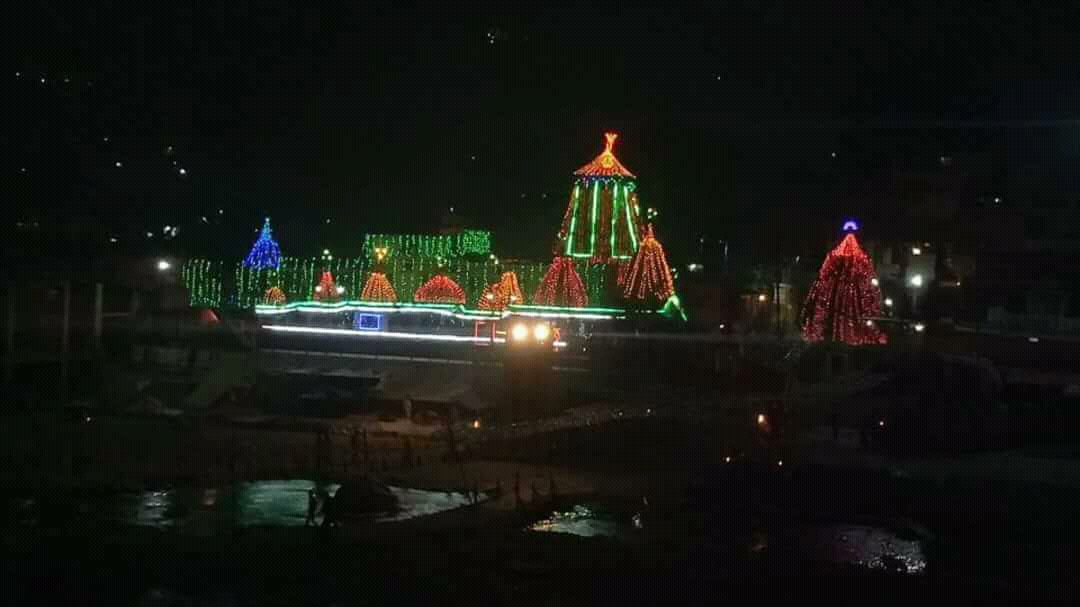
Bagnath Temple in Bageshwar during the Uttarayani Fair, 2018.

The Uttarayani Fair is held in Bageshwar town each year in the month of January on the occasion of Makar Sankrati. According to the Almora Gazetteer, even in the early twentieth century, the annual Uttarayani mela at Bageshwar was visited by approximately 15,000 people and was the largest fair of Kumaon division. The religious ritual of the Uttarayani mela consists of bathing before daybreak at the confluence of the rivers Saryu and Gomti followed by an offering of water to Lord Shiva inside the Bagnath Temple. Some devotees continue this practice for three days in succession, which is known as "Trimaghi". On this day, people also give 'khichdi' (a dish made by mixing pulses and rice) in charity, take ceremonial dips in holy rivers, participate in Uttarayani fairs, and offer deep fried sweetmeats consisting of flour and jaggery to crows and other birds as a way to pay homage to the departed souls of their ancestors.

=== West Bengal ===
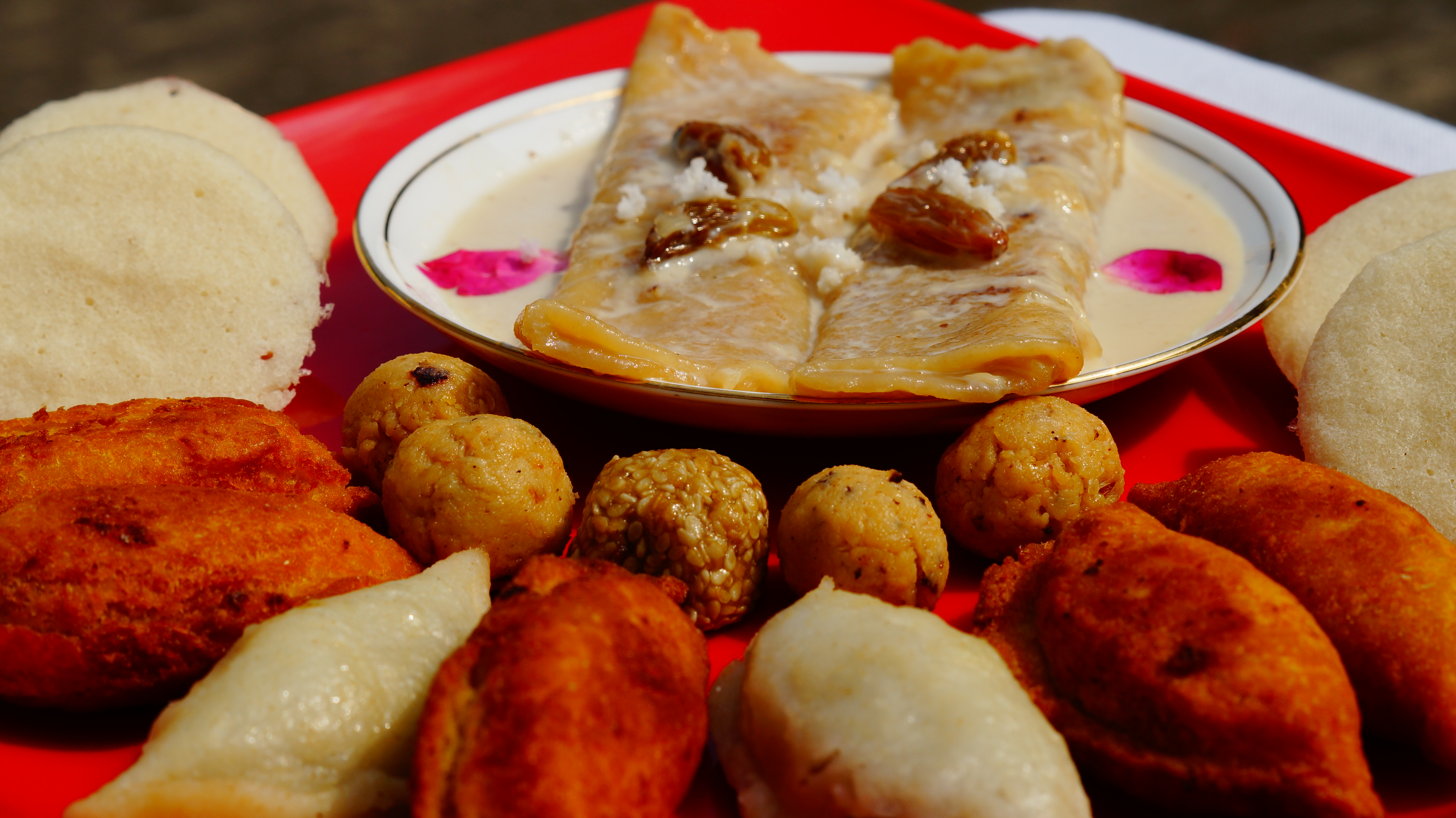
A feast at Poush Sankranti

In West Bengal, Makar Sankranti is also known as Poush Sankranti named after the Bengali month in which it falls. Freshly harvested paddy and date palm syrup in the form of Khejurer Gur (Bengali: খেজুরের গুড়) and Patali (Bengali: পাটালি) are used in the preparation of a variety of traditional Bengali sweets made with rice flour, coconut, and milk. These sweets are known as Pitha.

In the Sundarbans, Dakkhin Rai is worshipped at Dhapdhapi as a tall white-complexioned hunter deity carrying a gun. His temple at Dhapdhapi attracts large gatherings during Makar Sankranti, when the "Jatal Puja" commemorates his birth. Worship continues through the month of Asharh. Although Dakkhin Rai is regarded as a folk deity, rituals at the temple are performed by Brahmin priests.

In the Himalayan regions of Darjeeling, the festival is as known as Magey Sakrati. It is distinctly associated with the worship of Lord Shiva. Traditionally, people bathe at sunrise and then commence their pooja. Elsewhere, many people take a dip in places like Ganga Sagar. Ganga Sagar falls in West Bengal.

== Outside India ==
=== Bangladesh ===
Shakrain is an annual celebration of winter in Bangladesh in the downtown of Dhaka, observed with the flying of kites. Many families in villages across Bangladesh observe Makar Sankranti in many ways. The holiday is observed by a significant amount of the Bengali diaspora as well.

=== Nepal ===
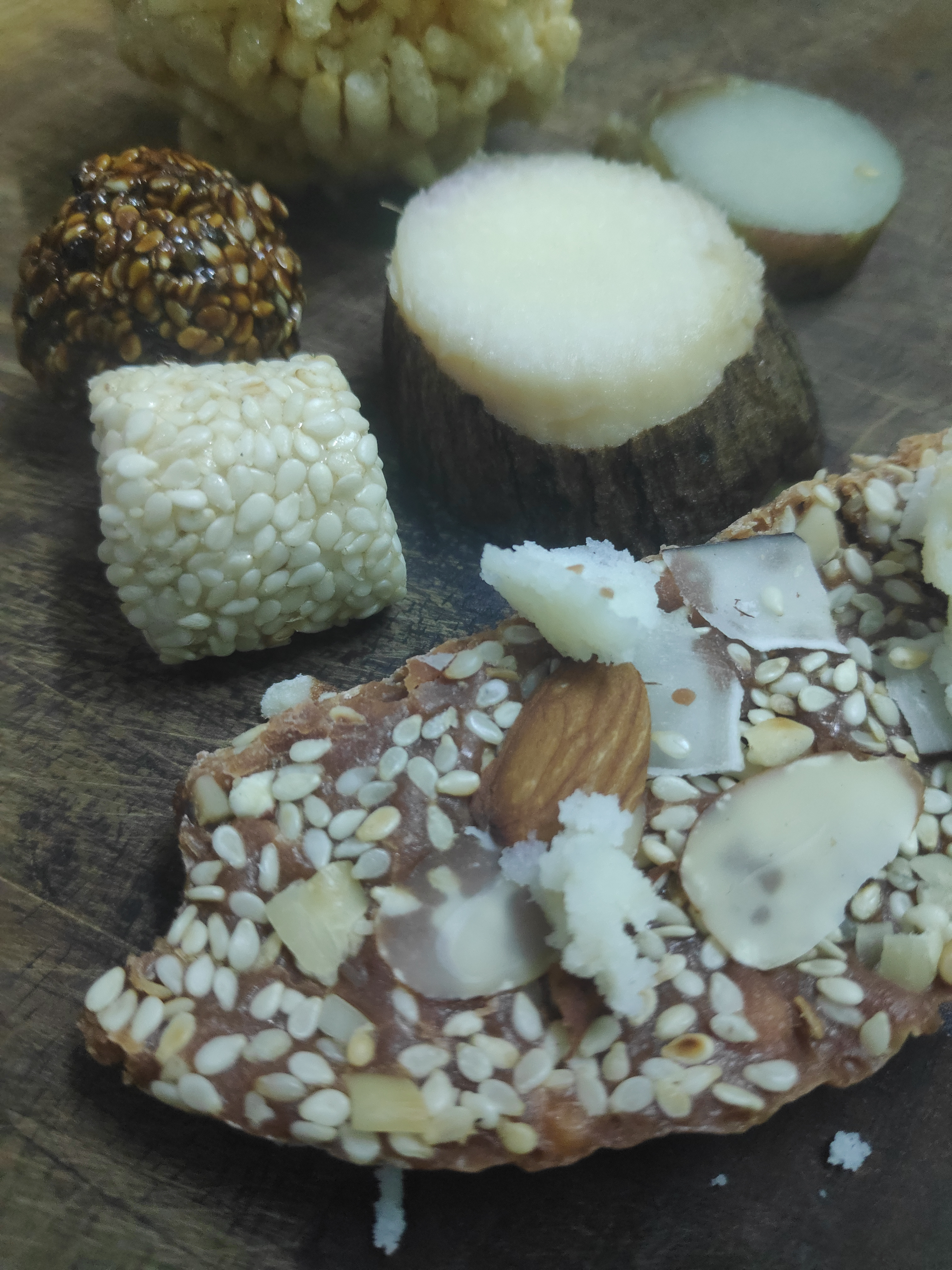
Maghe Sankranti Food

Maghe Sankranti is a Nepalese festival observed on the first of Magha in the Vikram Sambat (B.S) calendar (about 14 January). Tharu people celebrate this particular day as new year. It is also regarded as the major government declared annual festival of the Magar community.

=== Pakistan (Sindh) ===
On this festive day, Sindhi parents send ladoos and chiki (Laaee) made of sesame seeds to their married daughters. The Sindhi community in India too celebrate Makar Sankranti as Tirmoori which involves parents sending sweet dishes to their daughters.

=== Sri Lanka, Malaysia, Singapore, and among Tamil diasporas worldwide ===
On this day, the Tamil farmers and the Tamil People honour and perform a pooja to the Sun God Suriya Narayanan. This happens when the sun enters the zodiac sign of Capricorn (Makara). The Thai Pongal festival is celebrated in mid-January, or the Tamil month of Thai, to coincide with the rice harvest.

Pongal practices and rituals in Sri Lanka and diasporic countries aren't much differentiated from those followed in Southern India, outside notably the Jalikkattu practice, which is not existent among Sri Lankan Tamils and diasporic Tamil communities.

In Sri Lanka, celebrations of Pongal extend generally to two days and not four, and instead of the Pongal dish, a similar food called Pukkai is offered. Its preparation happen on the first day and not on the second as in India (where Pongal start one day earlier with Boghi day). Hence here, Pongal celebration is focused on the day of Thai Pongal only.

== See also ==
- Astronomical basis of the Hindu calendar
- List of Hindu festivals
- Jallikattu
- List of harvest festivals
- Uttarayana
