= Bishni Devi Shah =

Indian freedom fighter (1902 – 1972)

- Born: 12 October 1902; Bageshwar, now Uttarakhand, India
- Died: 1972 (aged 69–70)
- Known for: Indian independence movement

Bishni Devi Shah (12 October 1902– 1972) was an Indian independence activist from Uttarakhand and the first woman from the region to be jailed during India's independence movement.

== Early life ==
Bishni Devi was born on October 12, 1902, in Bageshwar, now Uttarakhand. Her early years were marked by numerous challenges and hardships. She was educated to the fourth grade. She was married at thirteen and widowed at sixteen. Being a widow rendered her an outcast in both her in-laws' and her own family.

== Life ==
Bishni Devi spent considerable time at the Nanda Devi temple in Almora, where she was actively involved in gatherings related to the freedom movement. To encourage protestors facing imprisonment, she would present them with flowers and perform their aarti, a ritual that typically involves singing praises of the deity. Additionally, she discreetly collected funds to support the families of those who had been incarcerated. Inspired by the poet Kumaoni Gorda, who wrote about issues such as untouchability and superstition, she also sang songs inspired by his works.

She would present flowers to the activists heading to jail and honored their courage by performing aarti for them. Additionally, she motivated the women associated with the activists. On May 25, 1930, a decision was made to raise the national flag at the Almora Nagar Palika. A procession of volunteers, including women, was halted by British soldiers, leading to a confrontation in which notable figures like Mohanlal Joshi and Shantilal Trivedi were injured. Despite the chaos, Bishni Devi remained undaunted. Together with other women, including Durga Devi Pant and Tulsi Devi Rawat, she raised the flag. The British government strongly opposed this act of defiance. Subsequently, she was arrested and imprisoned in Almora. After her release, she began advocating for Khadi. At that time, there was a scarcity of volunteers to distribute Swadeshi products in Almora, and shopkeepers were inflating prices. In response, Bishni Devi resolved to sell charkhas door-to-door for just five rupees, while the market price was ten rupees.

She educated women on how to use the charkha, thereby promoting Khadi and fostering self-sufficiency among the people. A Congress committee was established in Almora under Hargovind Pant's leadership, and Bishni Devi was elected as the women's manager. In 1931, she faced arrest once more, but after her release, she continued to speak out against British rule.

== Legacy ==
In 2021, the Postal Department initiated efforts to honor this courageous woman. As part of this initiative, her photograph and biography were featured on postal envelopes.
