= Badri Datt Pandey =

Indian historian, freedom fighter, Social Reformer

Pandit Badri Datt Pandey

Member of Parliament
- In office September 1957 – 1962
- Constituency: Almora

Personal details
- Born: 15 February 1882 Haridwar, British India
- Died: 13 January 1965 (aged 82)
- Party: Indian National Congress
- Occupation: Historian, Freedom Fighter, Social Reformer, Politician
- Known for: Indian independence movement Coolie-Begar movement

Pandit Badri Datt Pandey (15 February 1882 – 13 January 1965) was an Indian historian, freedom fighter, social reformer, and later a Member of Parliament from Almora in independent India.

== Early life ==
Badri Datt Pandey was born on 15 February 1882 in Haridwar to Vinayak Pandey, a Vaidya (traditional physician). After the death of his parents when he was seven years old, he moved to Almora, where he received his education.

== Work ==
In 1903, Badri Datt Pandey worked as a teacher before joining a government job in Dehradun, which he later left for journalism. In 1913, he assumed editorship of Almora Akhbar, using it as a platform to support the independence movement.

In 1918, as a prominent Kumaon Parishad leader Badri Dutt Pandey traveled to Calcutta to invite Mahatma Gandhi to Kumaun; however, Gandhi had to turn it down due to prior engagements.

Along with Govind Ballabh Pant, he was one of the foremost political leaders from Kumaon, then a part of the United Provinces in British India. He was popularly known as "Kumaon Kesari", a title he earned following the Coolie-Begar movement in 1921.

Almora Akhbar, where he served as editor, was shut down by British authorities due to its anti-government stance. Subsequently, he raised funds to start a new newspaper, Shakti, which was launched on 15 October 1918, the day of Vijayadashami.

During his time, Kumaoni society was affected by the practice of Nayak Pratha, in which member of Nayak caste used to sell their daughters into prostitution for their livelihood. Badri Datt Pandey actively campaigned against this practice, which eventually led to legislative action to abolish it. Badri Datt Pandey was imprisoned for one year in 1921, 18 months in 1930, one year in 1932, and three months in 1941. He was also jailed during the Quit India Movement in 1942.

His book, Kumaon Ka Itihas, is a comprehensive historical treatise on the Kumaon region.
