= Bageshwar =

- Town
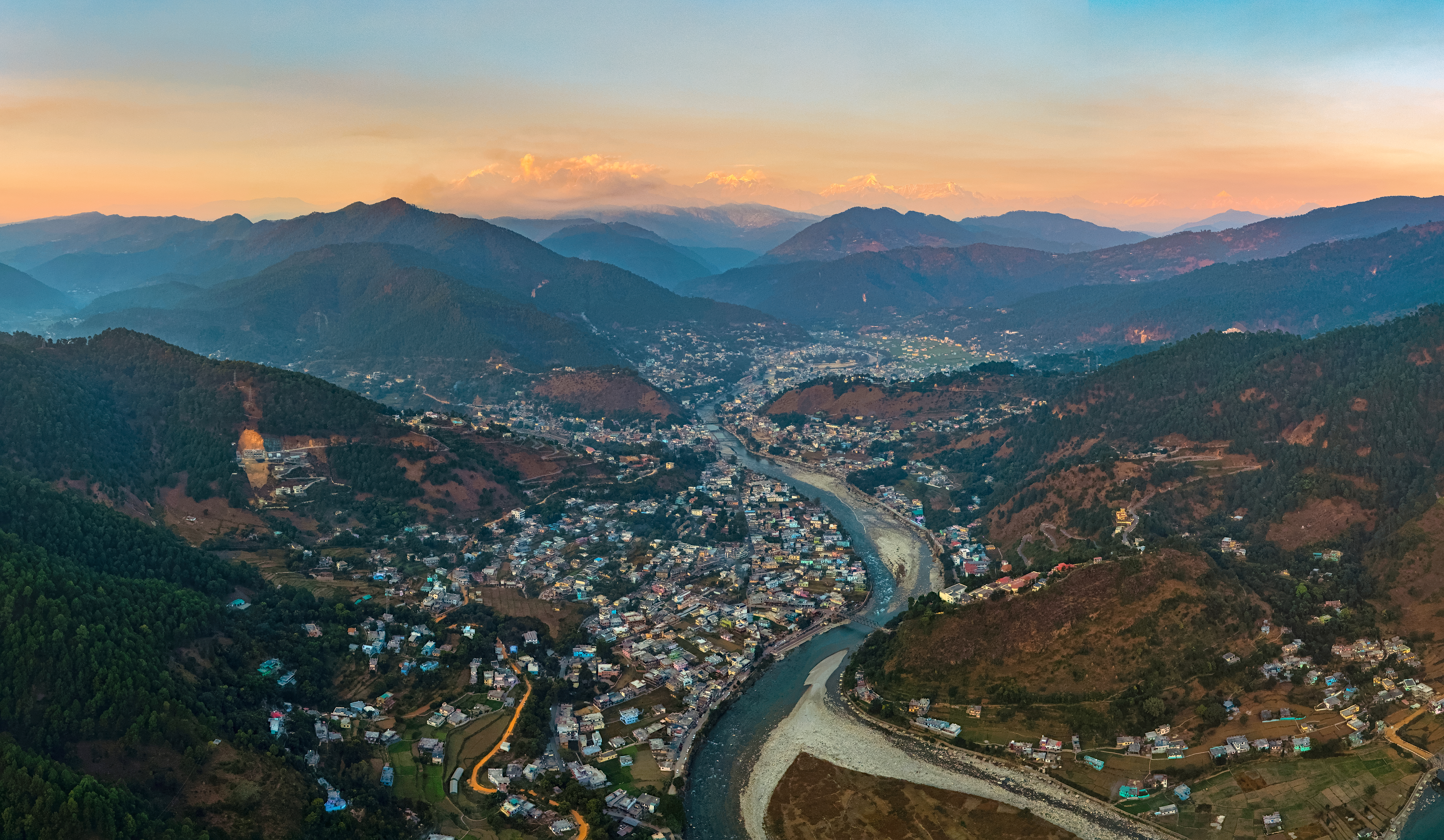
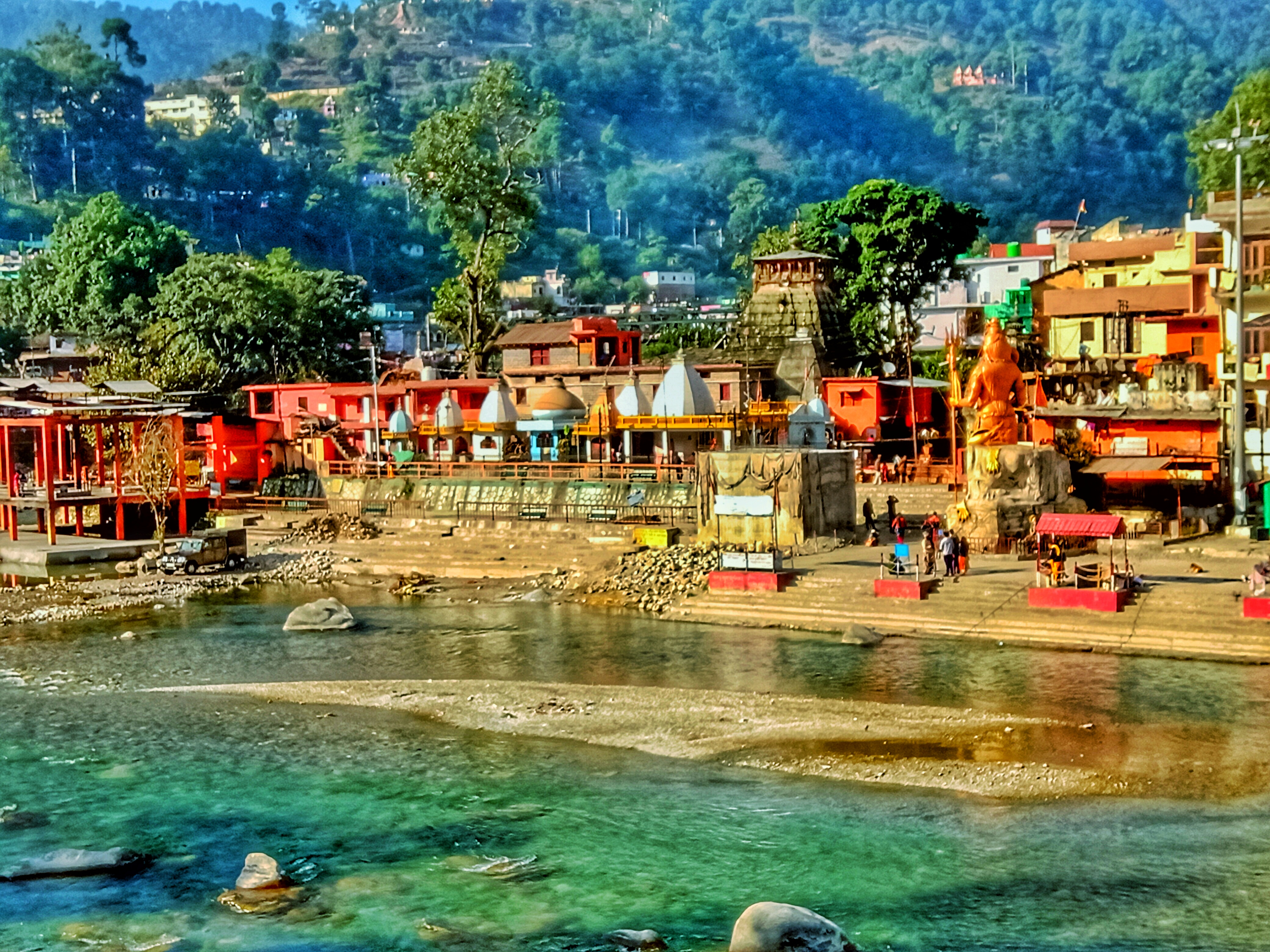
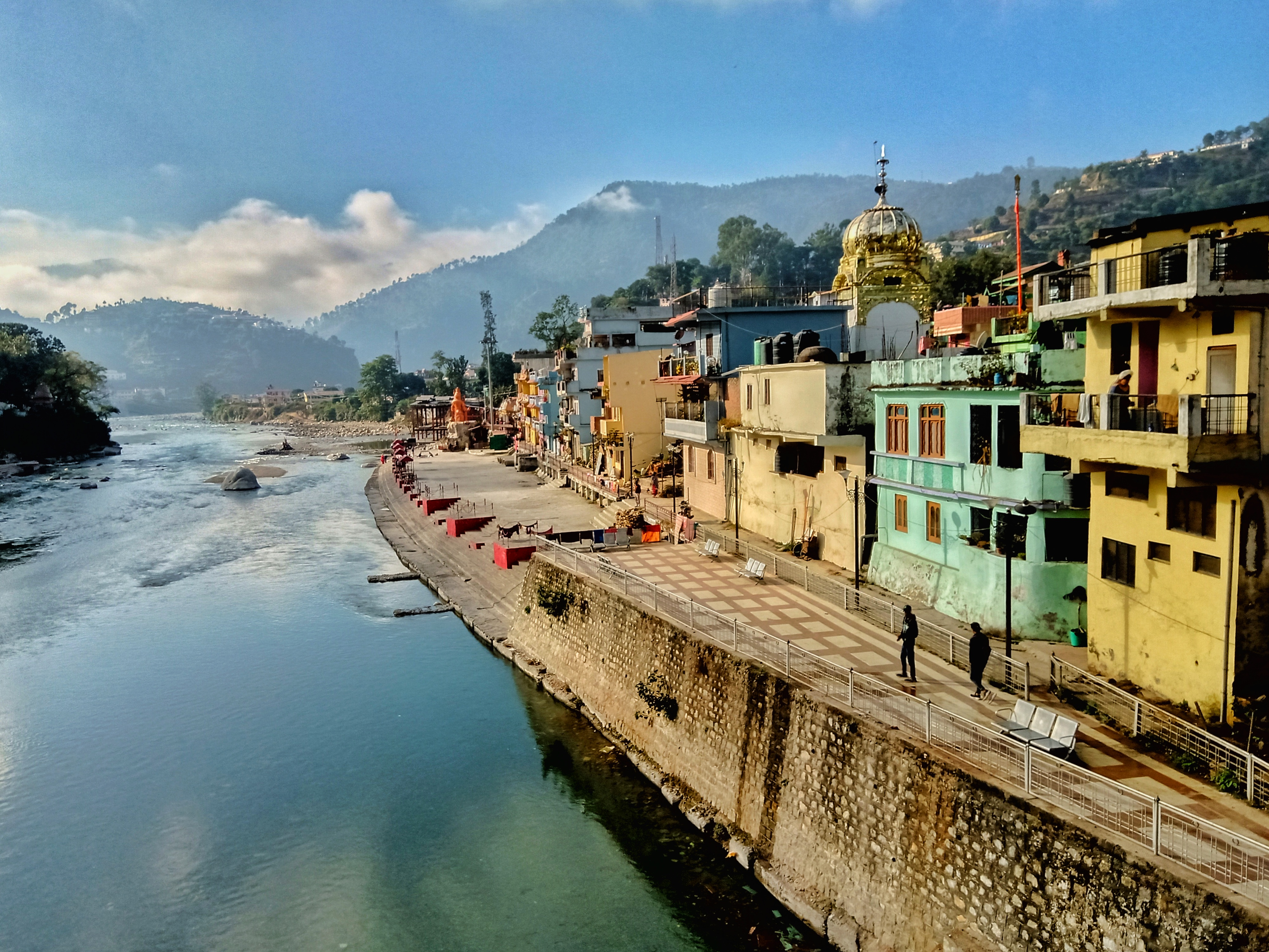
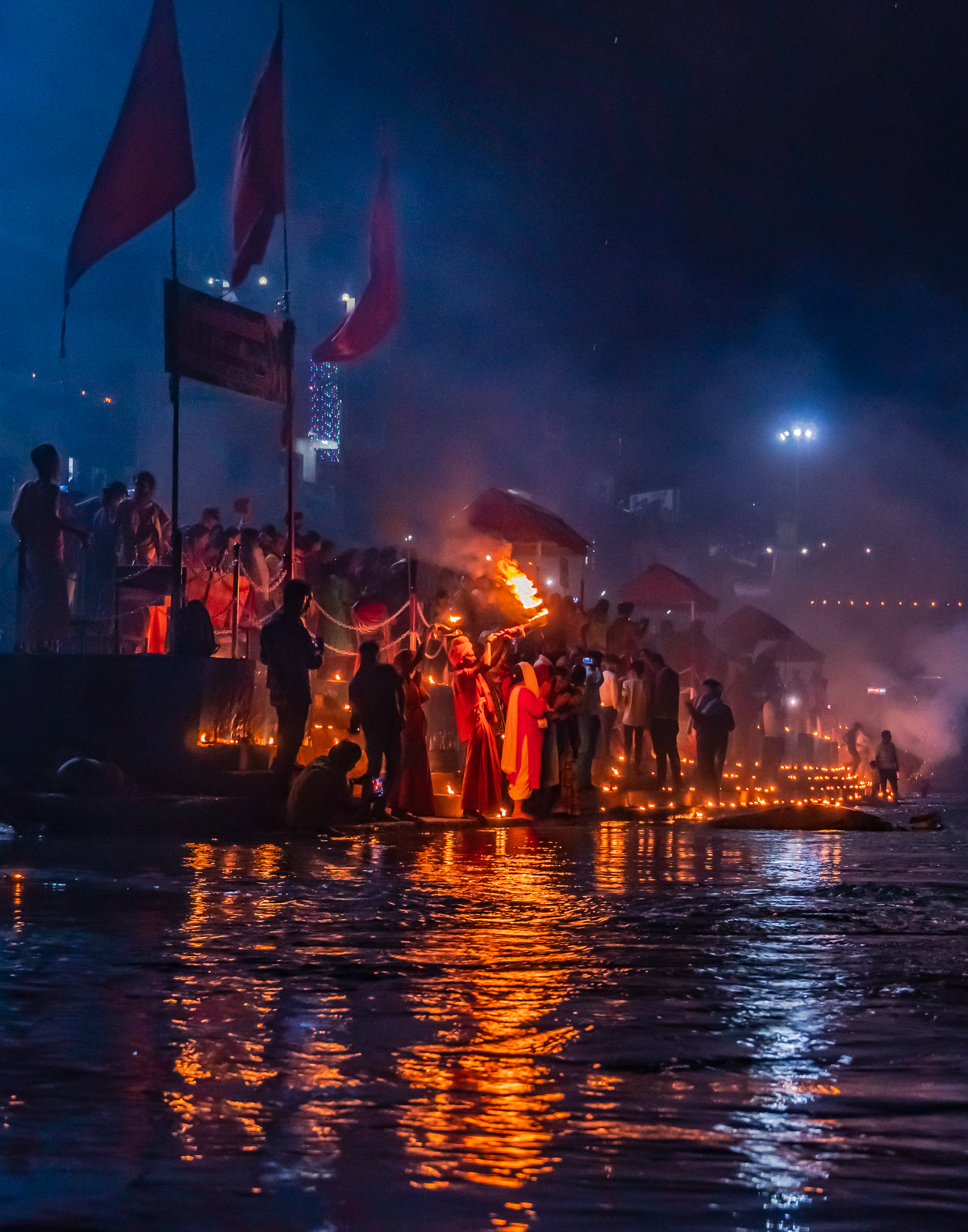
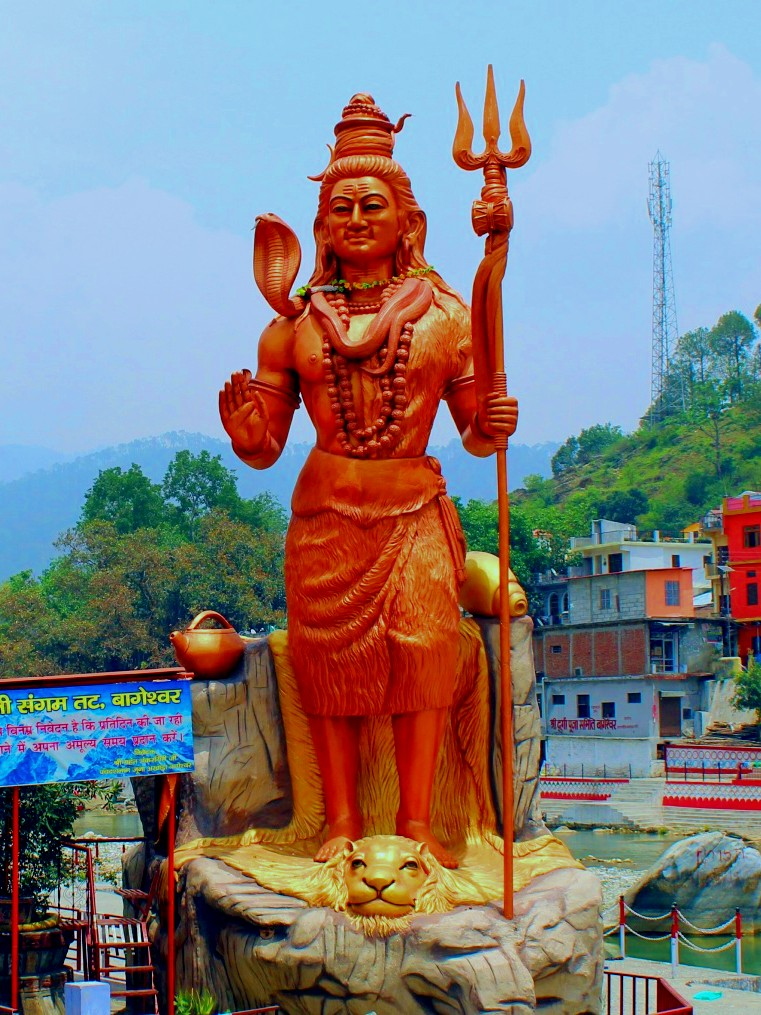
- Clockwise from top: View of Bageshwar, Sarju Ghat, Lord Shiva Statue, Evening Aarti at Sarju Ghat and Bagnath Temple

- Location in Uttarakhand, India Bageshwar (India)
- Coordinates: 29.838°N 79.771°E
- Country: India
- State: Uttarakhand
- Division: Kumaon
- District: Bageshwar

Government
  - Type: Municipality
  - Body: Nagar Palika Parishad Bageshwar

Area
  - Total: 5.50 km^{2} (2.12 sq mi)
- Elevation: 935 m (3,068 ft)

Population
  - Total: 9,079
  - Density: 1,650/km^{2} (4,280/sq mi)

Languages
  - Official: Hindi; Sanskrit
  - Native: Kumaoni
- Time zone: UTC+5:30 (IST)
- PIN: 263642
- Vehicle registration: UK-02
- Website: uk.gov.in

Bageshwar (Kumaoni: Bāgshyār) is a town and a municipal board in Bageshwar district in the state of Uttarakhand, India. It is located at a distance of 470 km from the National Capital New Delhi and 332 km from the State Capital Dehradun. Bageshwar is known for its scenic environment, glaciers, rivers and temples. It is also the administrative headquarters of Bageshwar district.

Situated on the confluence of Saryu and Gomati rivers, Bageshwar is surrounded by the mountains of Bhileshwar and Nileshwar to its east and west, the Suraj Kund in the north, and Agni Kund in the south. Bageshwar was a major trade mart between Tibet and Kumaun, and was frequented by the Bhotia traders, who bartered Tibetan wares, wool, salt and Borax in exchange for carpets and other local produces in Bageshwar. The trade routes were, however, closed after the Indo-China War of 1962.

The city is of great religious, historic and political significance. Bageshwar is mentioned in various Puranas, where it has been associated with Shiva. The Uttrayani fair held annually in Bageshwar used to be visited by approx 15,000 people in the early twentieth century, and was the largest fair of Kumaon division. The fair became the epicenter of the Coolie Begar Movement in January 1921. The city of Bageshwar gets its name from the Bagnath Temple. Hindi and Sanskrit are the official Languages however Kumaoni is spoken by a large number of people.

== Etymology ==
The name of the town is derived from the local temple dedicated to Shiva as Vagiswar (the lord of speech) or Vyaghreswar (the tiger lord). According to local legend, a Hindu saint was performing austerities in the dry bed of the Sarju river, stopping its flow. When complaints were made to Shiva, he and his consort Parvati devised a plan to resume the river's course. Parvati took the form of a cow and began to graze by the riverbank, while Shiva took the form of a tiger and pretended to spring upon her. This caused the saint to break his meditation to rescue the cow, allowing the river to resume its natural flow.

== History ==
=== Mythological origins and early history ===
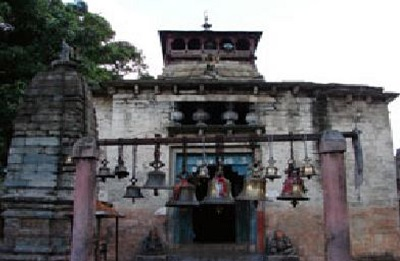
Bagnath Temple was erected in 1640 by King Laxmi Chand

Bageshwar is closely linked to the religious and mythological significance of the Bagnath Temple, dedicated to Lord Shiva, has been a revered site for centuries. According to the Manaskhand of the Shiva Purana, the temple and the surrounding town were established by Chandeesh, a servant of Lord Shiva.

Another popular legend involves Sage Markandeya, who is said to have worshipped Lord Shiva at this very spot. In one version of the legend, Lord Shiva blessed Sage Markandeya by appearing to him in the form of a tiger, which contributed to the region's strong religious and cultural identity.

=== Early medieval period ===
Bageshwar's history in the medieval period is tied to the powerful dynasties that ruled the Kumaon region. During the 7th century, Bageshwar was part of the Katyuri Kingdom and was situated near Kartikeypura, the capital of the Katyuri Dynasty. The Katyuris ruled the region until the death of Birdeo, the last ruler of the united Katyuris, in the 13th century. His death led to the fragmentation of the Katyuri kingdom into eight smaller princely states, with Bageshwar falling under the control of the Baijnath Katyurs, descendants of the original Katyuri kings.

The 10th century saw the rise of the Chand dynasty, founded by Som Chand, who displaced the Katyuris and established the new kingdom of Kurmanchal, later known as Kumaon. Som Chand's successors later moved the capital of Kumaon from Champawat to Almora in the 16th century, marking the establishment of the Chand dynasty's influence over the region.

=== Gorkha invasion and British annexation ===
A major event in the history of Bageshwar occurred in 1791 when the Gorkhas, expanding their kingdom westward across the Kali River, invaded Kumaon, including Bageshwar. The Gorkhas swiftly took control of the region and its administrative centers, including Almora, which was then the seat of the Kumaon Kingdom. However, Gorkha rule was short-lived. After the Anglo-Nepalese War (1814–1816), the British East India Company defeated the Gorkhas and forced them to cede Kumaon to the British under the Treaty of Sugauli in 1816.

Under British rule, the Kumaon region, including Bageshwar, was integrated into the Kumaon Province governed by a chief-commissioner on non-regulation system. In 1891, this region was administratively divided into three districts—Kumaon, Garhwal, and the Tarai. These were later reorganized again, with Almora and Nainital becoming the headquarters for eponymous districts. By 1886, Bageshwar had a population of about 500 people, as recorded in 'The Himalayan Gazetteer' by Atkinson.

=== Modern development ===
In the early 20th century, Bageshwar began to see some important infrastructural and administrative developments. In 1906, a dispensary was established in the town to provide basic healthcare services to the local population. Three years later, in 1909, a post office was set up, further enhancing the town's communication and administrative facilities.

Education also began to take root in the region. In 1926, a public school was established in Bageshwar, and it was later upgraded to a junior high school in 1933. These early efforts in education were pivotal in laying the groundwork for the town's later developments.

During this period, the British also conducted a survey for a potential rail link connecting Bageshwar with Tanakpur in 1902. However, the project was delayed due to the outbreak of World War I, and it was not pursued further during the British colonial period. In the 1980s, following a visit from Prime Minister Indira Gandhi, the British-era survey for a rail link between Bageshwar and Tanakpur was revisited, though the project did not proceed in the same manner as initially planned.

=== Post-independence developments ===
After India gained independence in 1947, Bageshwar was incorporated into the Almora district of Uttar Pradesh. In 1951, the town had a population of just 1,740 people and was part of the Kanda development block. This was a period of gradual development, with the consolidation of nine smaller villages into the Bageshwar State village in 1948. These villages would later form the nucleus of the town's urban growth.

In 1955, Bageshwar was officially declared a town under the UP Town Area Act of 1914, and the first Town Area Committee was constituted in 1957. Over the years, the town's infrastructure continued to improve, and in 1968, it achieved the status of a Municipal Council. One of the significant developments was the introduction of a water supply scheme in 1975, which was designed to cater to a population of 6,000 people by 1997.

Education saw further progress post-independence. In 1949, a private high school was opened in memory of Victor Mohan Joshi, and it was upgraded to an Inter College in 1967. In addition, the first women's primary school was established in the 1950s, and a women's public high school opened in 1975. The opening of the Government Degree College in 1974 by Hemwati Nandan Bahuguna marked another important milestone in the educational development of Bageshwar.

=== Formation of Bageshwar district ===
On 15 September 1997, Bageshwar became an independent district, carved out from Almora, with its own administrative headquarters. The district's formation was spearheaded by the then Uttar Pradesh Chief Minister, Mayawati. In 2000, following the creation of Uttarakhand as a separate state, Bageshwar became part of the newly formed Uttarakhand state. On November 9, 2000, following the creation of Uttarakhand as a separate state, Bageshwar became a part of the new state.

== Geography and Climate ==
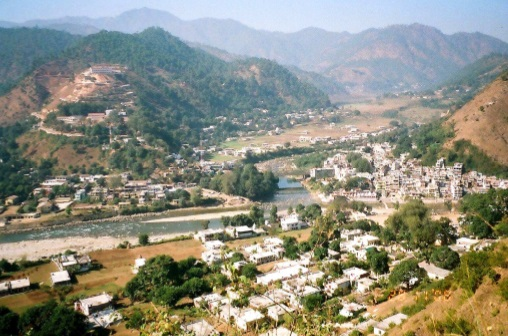
Bageshwar in 2006

Bageshwar is located at 29.49°N 79.45°E in Bageshwar District in Uttarakhand. It is situated 470 km North-East of the National Capital New Delhi and 332 km South-East of the State Capital Dehradun. It lies in the Kumaon division and is situated 153 km North-East of Nainital, the Headquarters of Kumaon. Bageshwar is situated in a valley of the Kumaon Hills of the Central Himalaya range. It has an average elevation of 934 metres (3,064 feet). The chief trees are the Chir Pine, Himalayan Cypress, Pindrow Fir, alder, sal or iron-wood, and saindan. Limestone, sandstone, slate, gneiss and granite constitute the principal geological formations.

Its climate is characterized by relatively high temperatures and evenly distributed precipitation throughout the year. In summer, Bageshwar is largely under the influence of moist, maritime airflow from the western side of the subtropical anticyclonic cells over low-latitude ocean waters. Temperatures are high and can lead to warm, oppressive nights. Summers are usually somewhat wetter than winters, with much of the rainfall coming from convectional thunderstorm activity; tropical cyclones also enhance warm-season rainfall in some regions. The coldest month is usually quite mild, although frosts are not uncommon, and winter precipitation is derived primarily from frontal cyclones along the polar front. The Köppen Climate Classification subtype for this climate is "Cfa" (Humid Subtropical Climate).

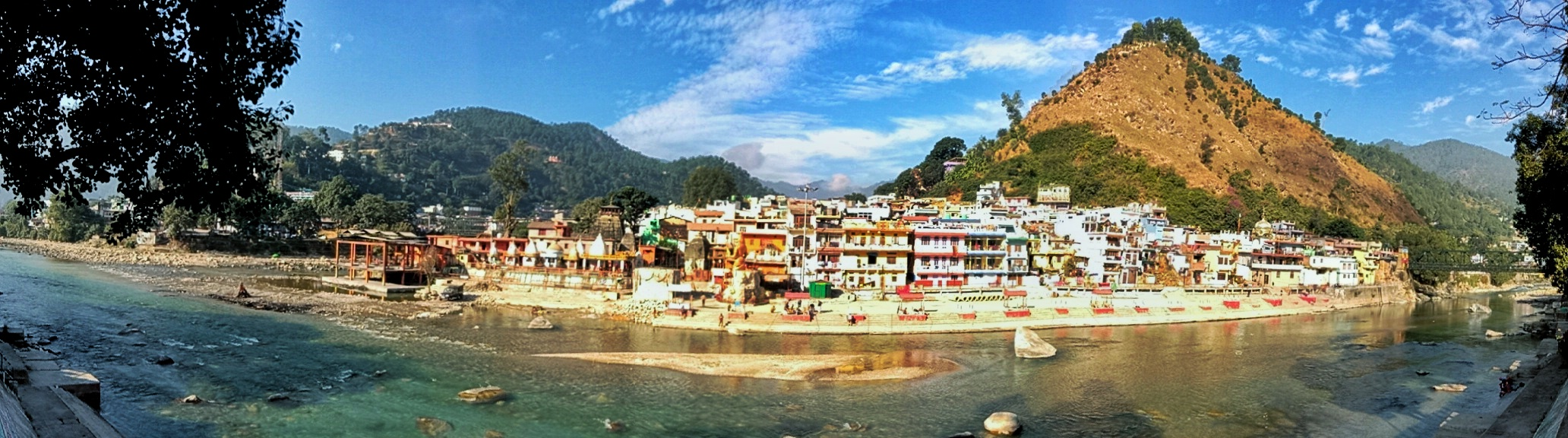
Panoramic view of Central Bageshwar with Saryu river in the foreground. The Saryu-Gomati Confluence (far left), Bagnath Temple (left), Saryu Ghat (center), Nileshwar Mountain (right) and Saryu Bridge (far right) are also visible.

The average temperature for the year in Bageshwar is 20.4 °C (68.7 °F). The warmest month, on average, is June with an average temperature of 27.3 °C (81.1 °F). The highest temperature ever recorded was 38 °C, recorded on 5 June 2017. The coolest month on average is January, with an average temperature of 11 °C (52 °F). The average amount of precipitation for the year in Bageshwar is 48.1 in (1,220 mm). The month with the most precipitation on average is July with 13.0 in (330 mm) of precipitation. The month with the least precipitation on average is November with an average of 0.2 in (5.1 mm). There are an average of 63.6 days of precipitation, with the most precipitation occurring in August with 15.3 days and the least precipitation occurring in November with 0.8 days.

Climate data for Bageshwar, India
Month	Jan	Feb	Mar	Apr	May	Jun	Jul	Aug	Sep	Oct	Nov	Dec	Year
Mean daily maximum °C (°F)	17.2 (63.0)	19.5 (67.1)	25.0 (77.0)	30.7 (87.3)	33.7 (92.7)	32.9 (91.2)	29.4 (84.9)	28.9 (84.0)	28.7 (83.7)	27.4 (81.3)	23.6 (74.5)	19.1 (66.4)	26.4 (79.5)
Daily mean °C (°F)	11.0 (51.8)	13.1 (55.6)	18.1 (64.6)	23.6 (74.5)	26.8 (80.2)	27.4 (81.3)	25.4 (77.7)	26.8 (80.2)	24.2 (75.6)	21.3 (70.3)	16.8 (62.2)	12.7 (54.9)	20.5 (68.9)
Mean daily minimum °C (°F)	4.9 (40.8)	6.7 (44.1)	11.2 (52.2)	16.5 (61.7)	19.8 (67.6)	21.8 (71.2)	21.5 (70.7)	21.3 (70.3)	19.8 (67.6)	15.2 (59.4)	10.0 (50.0)	6.3 (43.3)	14.6 (58.3)
Average precipitation mm (inches)	32.9 (1.30)	35.1 (1.38)	30.1 (1.19)	24.4 (0.96)	43.7 (1.72)	157.0 (6.18)	328.9 (12.95)	328.2 (12.92)	178.4 (7.02)	42.5 (1.67)	6.0 (0.24)	13.6 (0.54)	1,220.8 (48.06)
Average precipitation days	2.7	2.9	2.8	2.1	3.0	8.1	14.2	15.3	8.3	2.3	0.8	1.1	63.6
Mean daily sunshine hours	10.9	11.6	12.4	13.3	14.1	14.5	14.3	13.6	12.7	11.8	11.1	10.7	12.6
Source: Weatherbase

=== Environmental Concerns ===
The Saryu and Gomti rivers have faced significant ecological degradation due to the unregulated disposal of construction debris and municipal waste. Reports indicate that rubble from road construction and landslides is frequently dumped into the riverbeds, particularly in the Kapkot and Bageshwar areas, which has led to the formation of artificial lakes and a rise in riverbed levels. Environmentalists and local groups have raised concerns over the increasing pollution levels and the lack of a proper waste trenching ground, which poses public health risks. Furthermore, widespread encroachment by homes and commercial shops along riparian zones and seasonal drains has significantly increased the risk of natural disasters in the town. In 2025, the Uttarakhand High Court directed district authorities to address these illegal occupations and submit a comprehensive report.

== Demographics ==
Religions in Bageshwar (2011)
1. Hinduism (93.3%)
2. Islam (5.93%)
3. Sikhism (0.25%)
4. Christianity (0.26%)
5. Buddhism (0.01%)
6. Jainism (0.02%)
7. Other or not religious (0.19%)

Historical population
Year	Pop.	±%
1951	1,740	—
1961	2,189	+25.8%
1971	4,314	+97.1%
1981	4,225	−2.1%
1991	5,772	+36.6%
2001	7,803	+35.2%
2011	9,079	+16.4%

According to the 2011 census of India, Bageshwar has a population of 9,079 comprising 4,711 males and 4,368 females. Males constitute approximately 55% of the population and females 45%. The sex ratio of bageshwar is 1090 women per 1000 men, higher than the national Average of 940 women per 1000 men. The City ranked 4th in Uttarakhand in terms of Sex Ratio. Bageshwar has an average literacy rate of 80%, higher than the national average of 72.1%; with 84% of the males and 76% of females literate. 11% of the population is under 6 years of age. 2,219 people belong to the Scheduled Castes while the population of people belonging to Scheduled Tribes is 1,085. Bageshwar had a population of 7803 according to 2001 Census and 5,772 according to the 1991 census.

Out of total population, 2,771 were engaged in work or business activity. Of this 2,236 were males while 535 were females. In census survey, worker is defined as person who does business, job, service, and cultivator and labour activity. Of total 2771 working population, 78.06% were engaged in Main Work while 21.94% of total workers were engaged in Marginal Work.

Hinduism is practiced by 93.34% of total population and is the religion of the Majority in Bageshwar. Other Religions include Islam (5.93%), Sikhism (0.25%), Christianity (0.26%), Buddhism (0.01%) and Jainism (0.02%).

Kumaoni is the majority first language, although Hindi and Sanskrit are the official languages of the state. English is also spoken by a small number of people.

== Government and politics ==
The Bageshwar Assembly seat is reserved for a person belonging to the Scheduled Castes. Parwati Das from Bharatiya Janata Party is the present MLA OF Bageshwar. Bageshwar is a "Nagar Palika Parishad" (Municipal Council) city in district of Bageshwar, Uttarakhand. The Bageshwar city is divided into 11 wards, for which elections are held every 5 years. The Bageshwar Nagar Palika Parishad has population of 9,079 of which 4,711 are males while 4,368 are females as per report released by Census India 2011. Suresh khetwal from Independent candidate is the Mayor of Bageshwar. Bageshwar Nagar Palika Parishad has total administration over 2,054 houses to which it supplies basic amenities like water and sewerage. It is also authorized to build roads within Nagar Palika Parishad limits and impose taxes on properties coming under its jurisdiction. The Uttarakhand Power Corporation Ltd. (UPCL) is responsible for supply of electricity in the city. Uttarakhand Jal Vidyut Nigam Ltd. generates electricity from the 8.5 MW electric sub-station at Bageshwar. The Notified Area Committee, Bageshwar is responsible for approval of building plans after getting no objection certificate from various departments like Jal Nigam, PWD, Electricity Board and Health Department etc.

== Economy ==
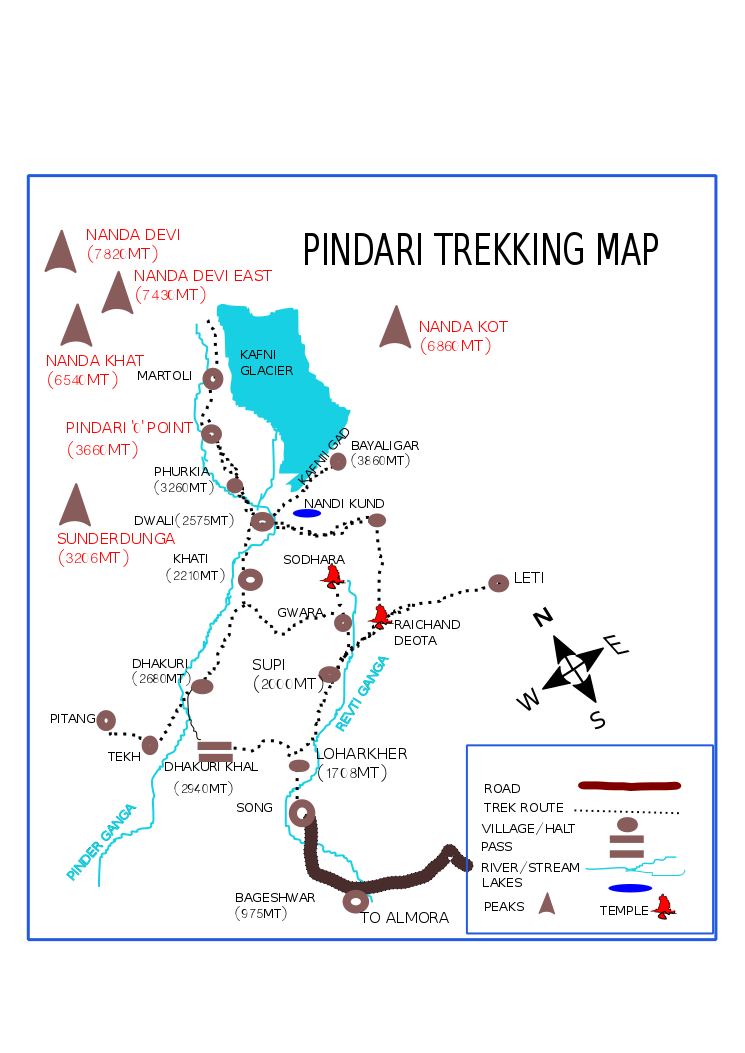
Pindari Glacier trek route; Bageshwar acts as a starting point for many trekking routes notably being to Pindari, Kafni and Sunderdhunga Glacier

Bageshwar's largest economic sectors include agriculture, trade, transportation, municipal, tourism and resource extraction. Copper Utensils and Carpets were listed as the two most important industrial commodities produced in Bageshwar in the 2011 Census of India. Large portions of the local economy of Bageshwar depend on its geographical location and surrounding natural resources. Per capita income of Bageshwar was Rs 22709 in 2015. Bageshwar is a major tourist destination and acts as a starting point for many trekking routes notably being to Pindari, Kafni and Sunderdhunga Glacier. It also lies along the path to Kailash-Mansarovar pilgrimage.

Bageshwar has traditionally been a major gateway for trade with Central Asia and Tibet. It carried on a brisk trade between Central Asia and Kumaon, and was described in The Imperial Gazetteer of India as "one of the main outlets for the Tibetan traffic". The Bhotiya traders travelled to Tibet and sold their wares at major fairs in Bageshwar, Gyanema and Gartok. The city was once rich in agriculture and animal husbandry. Besides growing crops, people were mainly engaged in sheep rearing. However, agriculture and sheep rearing in Bageshwar have suffered as villagers, who are increasingly joining armed forces, after retirement are settling down in Bageshwar town instead of their native villages.

The traditional Uttarayani festival organised since centuries on the banks of the Sarju and Gomati rivers was the main place where woollen outfits made by Saukas of Munsiyari were brought form higher valleys for ages, thus strengthening trade links between the two communities.

As of 2006, Bageshwar had a total of 6 Health Care units including four Hospitals (Two Allopathic, one Ayurvedi and one Homeopathic), one Maternity & Child welfare centre and one Community Health Centre. Bageshwar has a total of Five Nationalized Bank's, Two Post Offices, One Telegraph Office, 80 PCO'S and 1844 Telephone Connections. Mobile Communication services are provided by Private companies like Vodafone, Airtel, Idea, Reliance etc.

== Culture ==
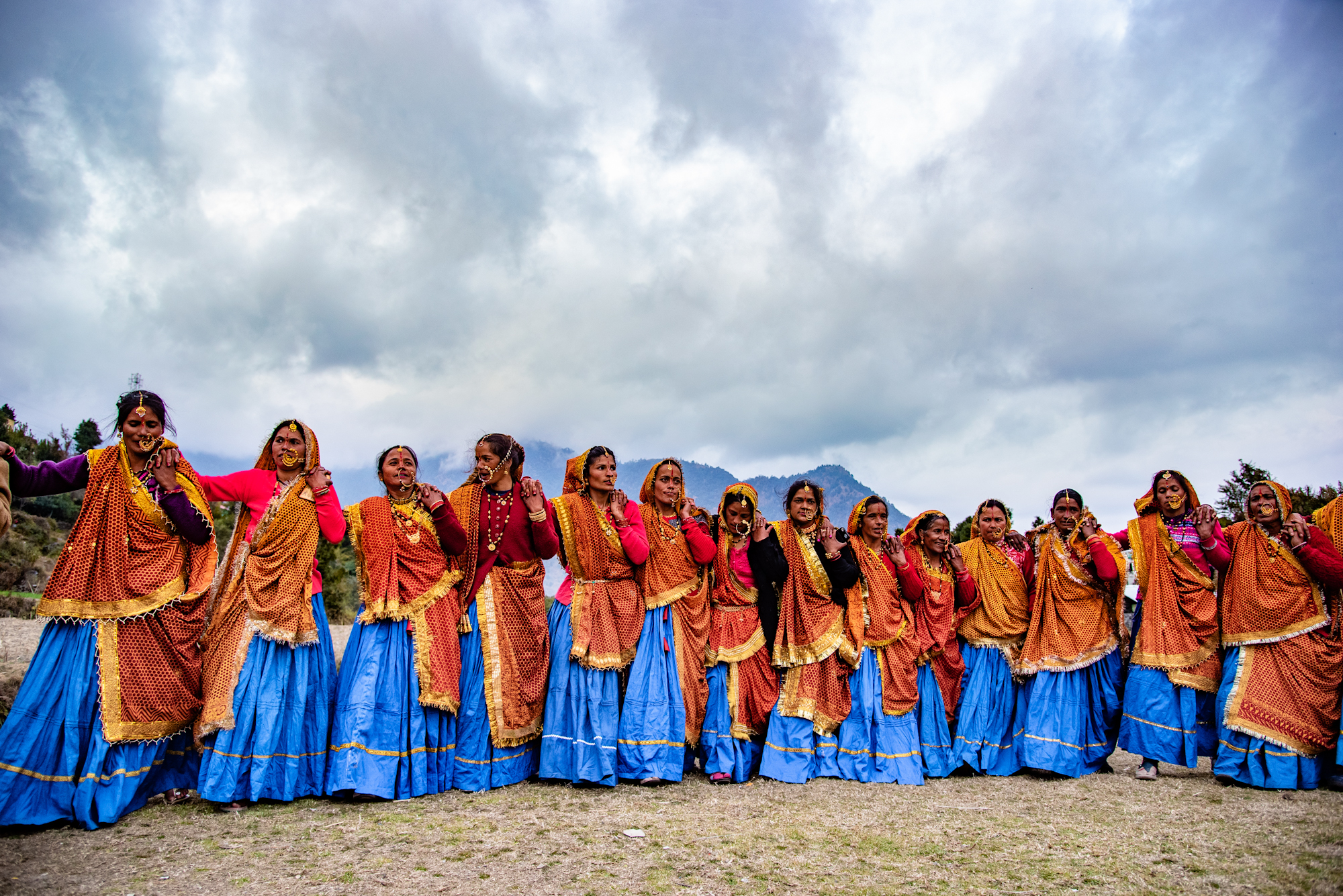
Chanchari is a popular folk dance from Danpur region in Bageshwar

Many classical dance forms and folk art are practised in the city. Some well-known dances include Hurkiya Baul, Jhora-Chanchri and Chholiya. Music is an integral part of the Kumaoni culture. Popular types of folk songs include Mangal and Nyoli. These folk songs are played on instruments including dhol, damau, turri, ransingha, dholki, daur, thali, bhankora, mandan and mashakbaja. Music is also used as a medium through which the gods are invoked. Jagar is a form of spirit worship in which the singer, or Jagariya, sings a ballad of the gods, with allusions to great epics, like Mahabharat and Ramayana, that describe the adventures and exploits of the god being invoked. Ramleela has been staged annually during the autumn festival of Navratri since 1948 in Bageshwar.

The primary food of Bageshwar is vegetables with wheat being a staple. A distinctive characteristic of Kumaoni cuisine is the sparing use of tomatoes, milk, and milk based products. Coarse grain with high fibre content is very common in Kumaon due to the harsh terrain. Another crop which is associated with Kumaon is Buckwheat (locally called Kotu or Kuttu). Generally, either Desi Ghee or Mustard oil is used for the purpose of cooking food. Simple recipes are made interesting with the use of hash seeds Jakhya as spice. Bal Mithai is a popular fudge-like sweet. Other local dishes include Dubuk, Chains, Kap, Chutkani, Sei, and gulgula. A regional variation of Kadhi called Jhoi or Jholi is also popular.

The town historically hosted three major semi-religious fairs: Shivratri in February, Dussehra, and the principal Uttarayani fair in mid-January, which celebrates the winter solstice. In the early 20th century, the Uttarayani fair attracted around 10,000 attendees. It served as a major trade gathering where Bhotia and Tibetan merchants sold musk pods, furs, yak tails, ponies, wooden bowls, and curiosities. Merchants from Almora brought cotton goods and brass, copper, and iron vessels, while local hill residents traded provisions, basketry, and forest produce.

The primary religious site, the Bagnath Temple, is an ancient foundation, though the current structure was erected by Raja Laxmi Chand around 1450 CE. Early British observers also noted the presence of certain tombs resembling those at Dwarahat, which were locally attributed to early Mughal colonies.

== Temples ==
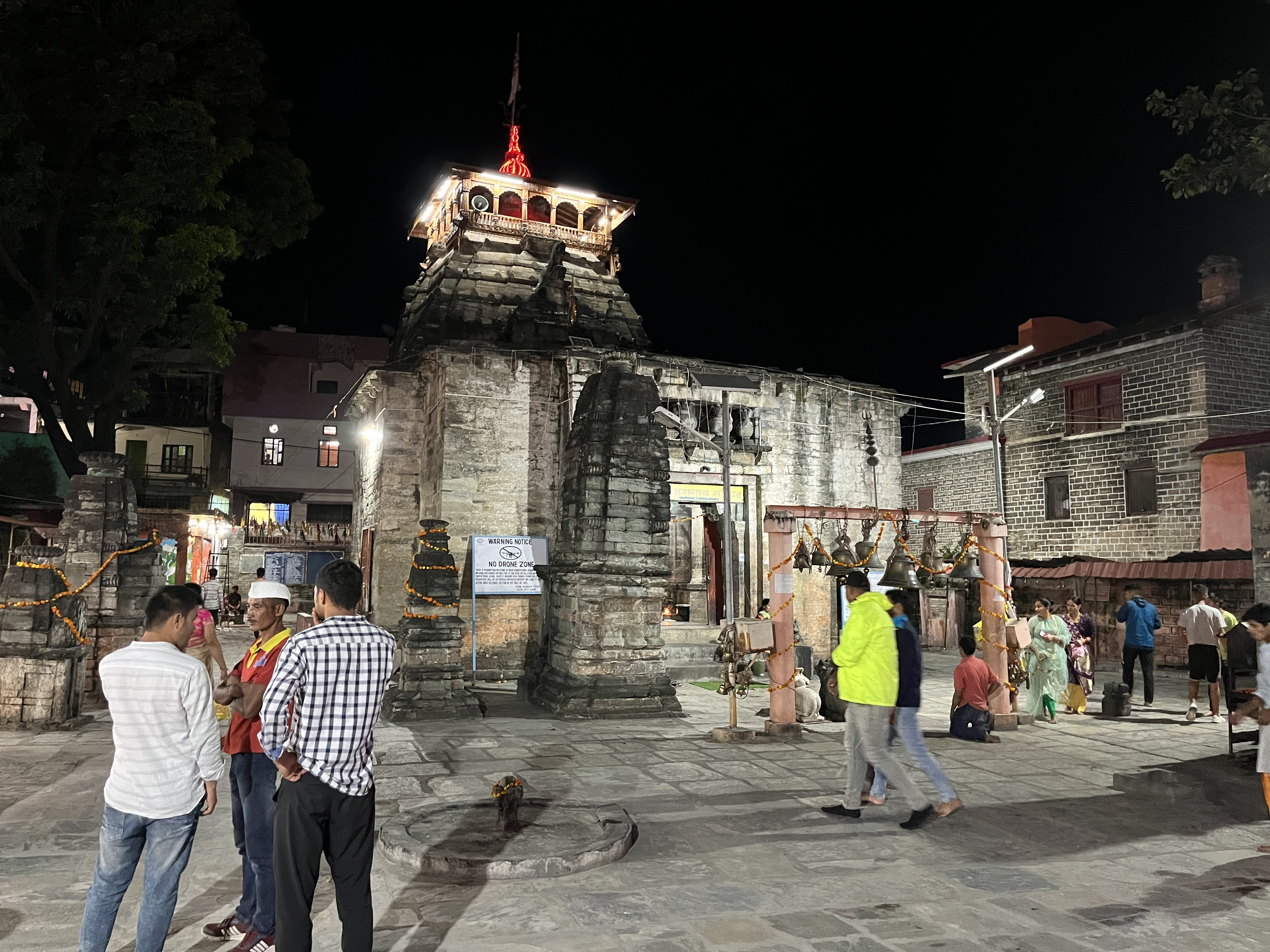
Bagnath Temple was erected in 1640 by King Laxmi Chand

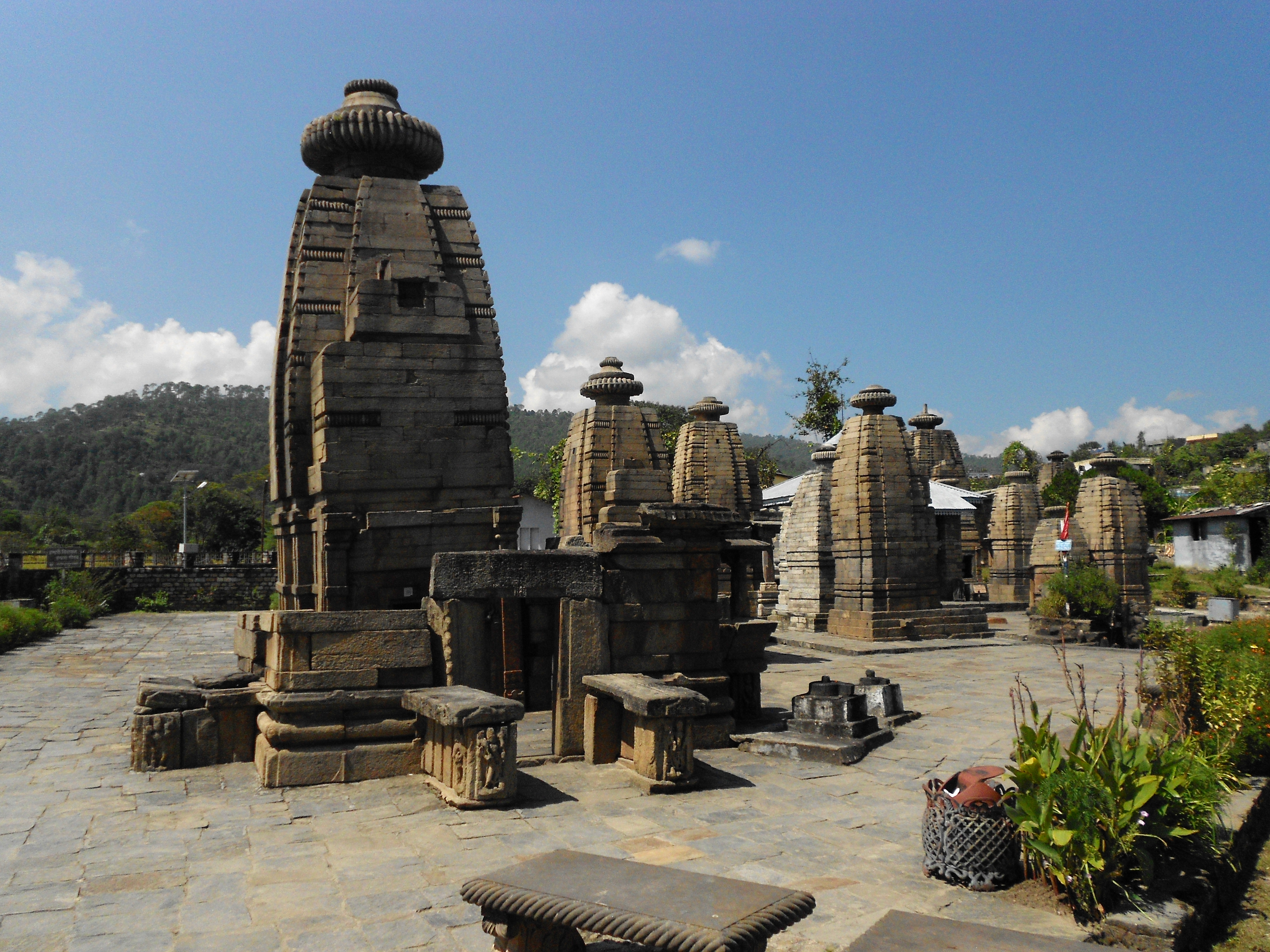
Group of Temples at Baijnath; 20 km northwest to Bageshwar

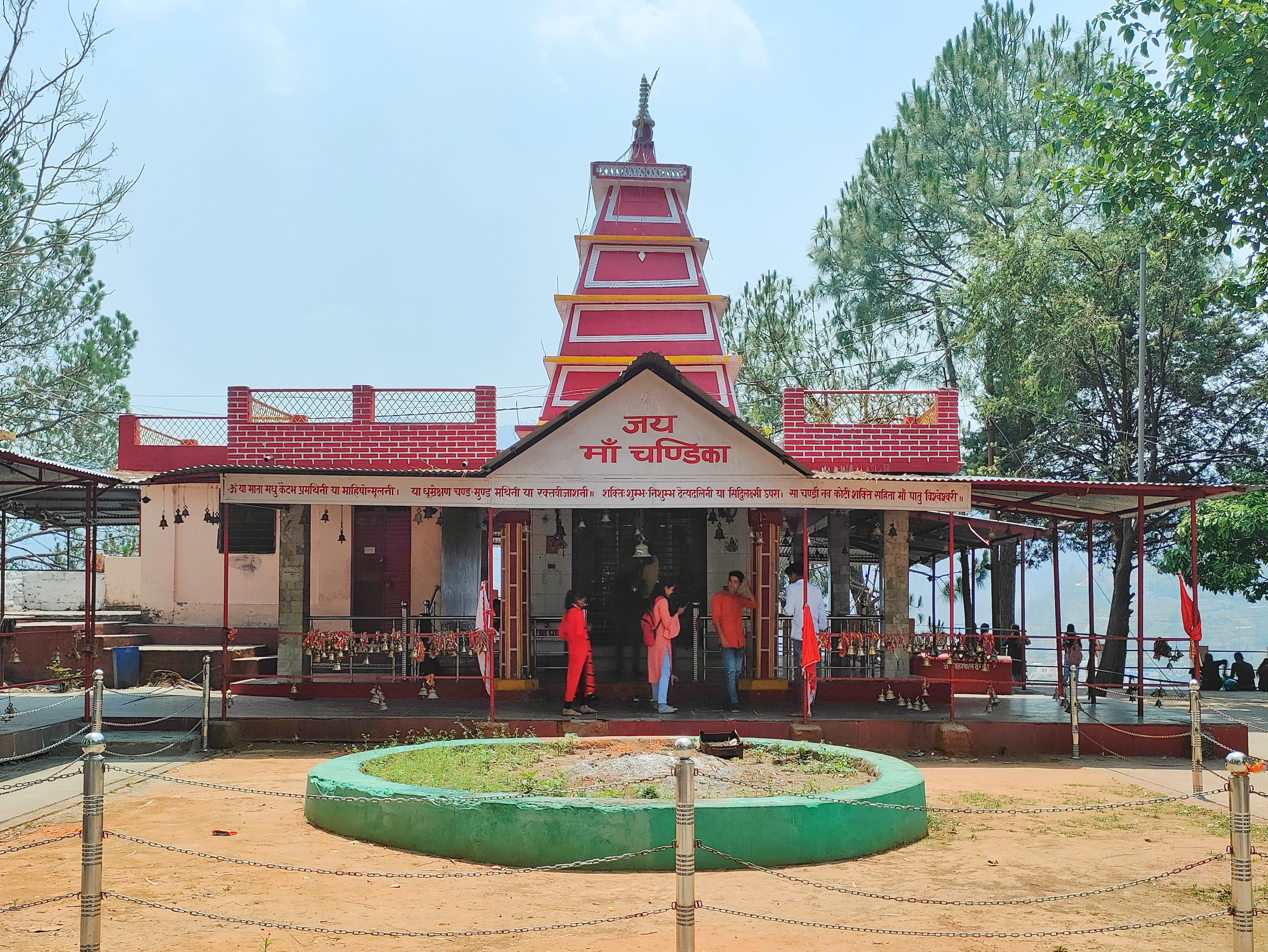
Chandika Temple stands at a distance of about half a kilometre from Bageshwar.

Hinduism is practiced by 93.34% and is the religion of the Majority in Bageshwar therefore Various Temples are situated in Bageshwar. the major one being:

- Bagnath Temple

At the junction of the rivers, Gomati and Sarju stands a large temple with its conical tower. Here is the shrine of Bageswar or Vyagreswar, the, "Tiger Lord", an epithet of Lord Siva. This temple was erected by the Kumaun king, Laxmi Chand, about 1450 A.D., but there is a Sanskrit inscription there of a far earlier date. The temple is flooded with devotees on the annual occasion of Shivratri. This place has a cluster of temples. Prominent among these temples are the Bairav temple, Dattatrey Maharaj, Ganga Mai temple, Hanuman temple, Durga temple, Kalika temple, Thingal Bhirav temple, Panchnam Junakhara and the Vaneshwar temple.

- Baijnath Temple

Baijnath Temple is located on the left bank of the Gomti river. This is a shiv temple which was built by a Brahmin widow.

- Chandika Temple

A temple dedicated to Goddess Chandika stands at a distance of about half a kilometre from Bageshwar. Every year, the temple bustles with activity as the devout congregate here to offer pujas to the deity during the Navratras.

- Sriharu Temple

Another important temple, the Sriharu temple, is situated at a distance of about 5 km from Bageshwer. The devotees believe that prayers for wish fulfilment here never go in vain. Every year, a large fair is organised on the Vijya Dashmi day following the Navratras.

- Gauri Udiyar

This is situated 8 km from Bageshwer. A large cave, measuring 20 m x 95 m is situated here, which houses the idols of Lord Shiva.

== Transport ==
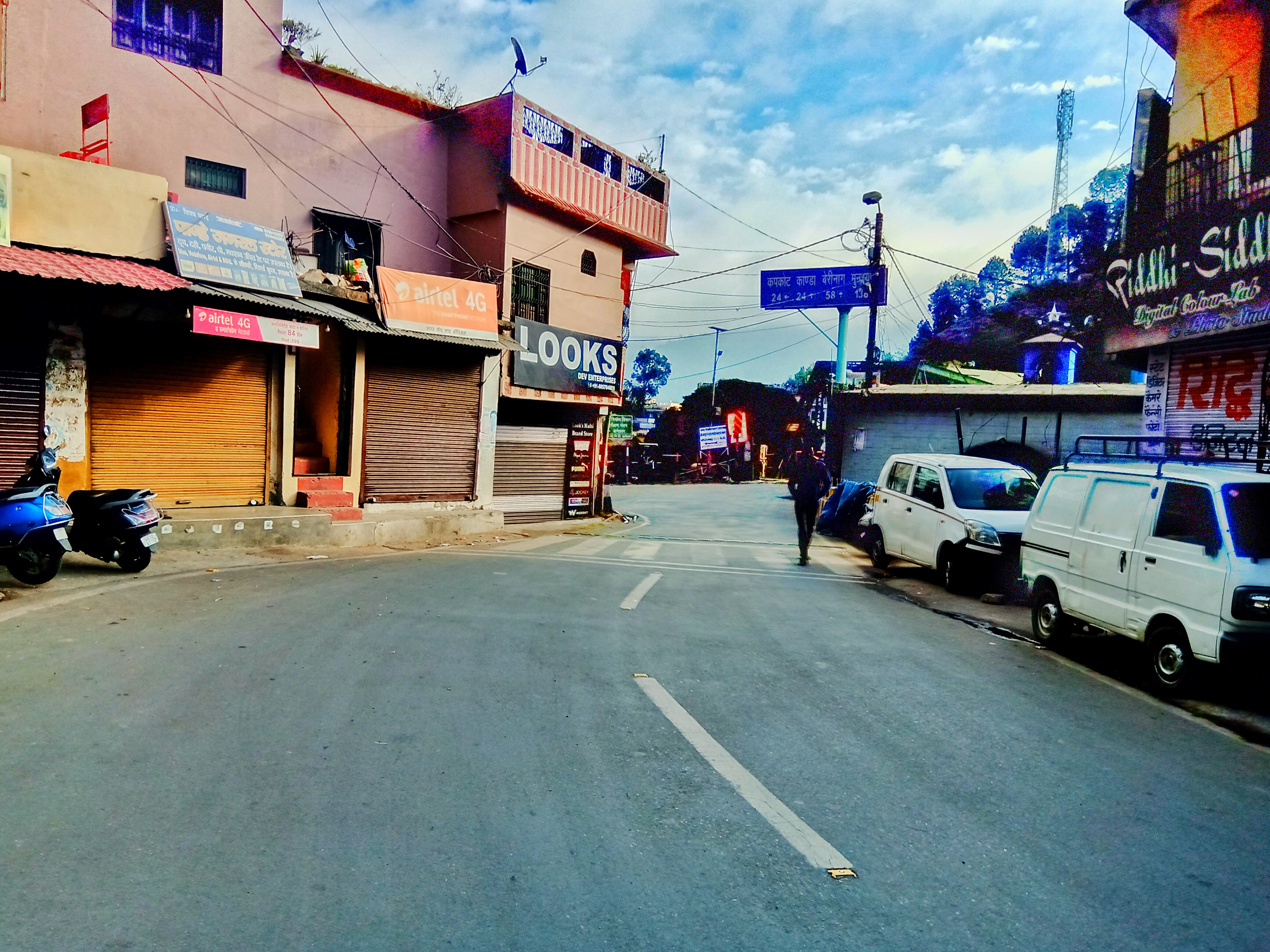
NH 309A (former UP SH 37) connects Bageshwar to Almora.

Pantnagar Airport, located in Pantnagar is the primary Airport serving entire Kumaon Region. The Government is planning to develop Naini Saini Airport in Pithoragarh which once developed will be much nearer. Indira Gandhi International Airport, located in Delhi is the nearest international Airport.

Kathgodam railway station is the nearest railway station. Kathgodam is the last terminus of the broad gauge line of North East Railways that connects Kumaon with Delhi, Dehradun, and Howrah. A new Railway line connecting Bageshwar with Tanakpur has been a long-standing demand of the people of the region. the tanakpur-Bageshwar rail link was first planned by British in 1902. However the project was stalled by Railway ministry in 2016 citing the commercial viability of the rail line. There have also been speculations about another railway line, that would connect Bageshwar to Chaukhutia via Garur.

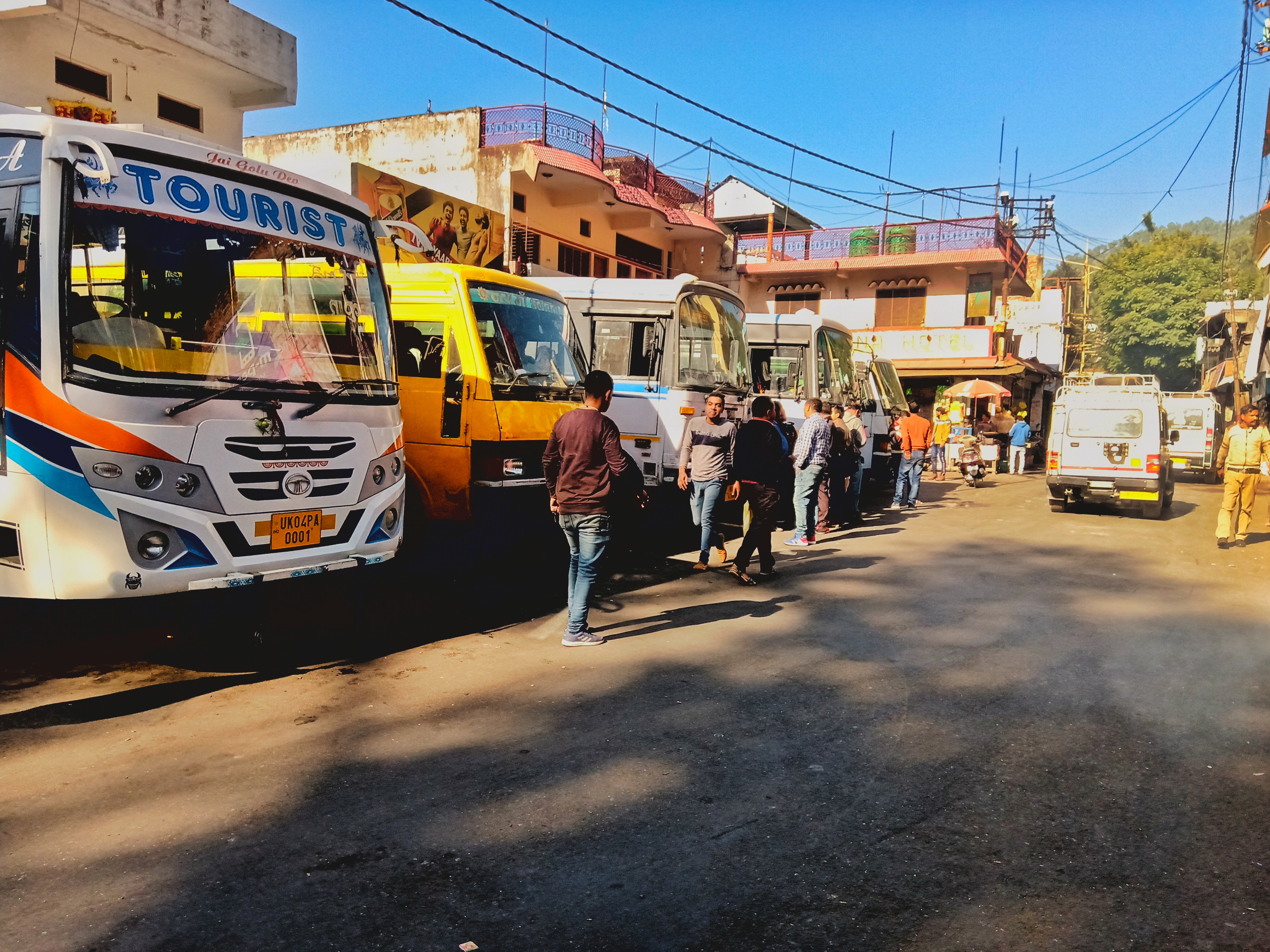
Bageshwar KMOU station was the only bus station in the city until the opening of Roadways station in 2020.

Bageshwar is well connected by motorable roads with major destinations of Uttarakhand state and northern India. The major roads passing through Bageshwar include NH 109K, NH 309A, Bareilly-Bageshwar Highway, and the Bageshwar-Someshwar-Dwarahat road. Uttarakhand Transport Corporation runs Buses from Bageshwar bus station to Delhi, Dehradun, Bareilly and Almora; while K.M.O.U (Kumaon Motor Owner's Union) runs 55 buses on various routes to Haldwani, Almora, Takula, Berinag, Pithoragarh, Didihat and Gangolihat. Taxis and Private Buses, mostly run by K.M.O.U, connect Bageshwar to other major destinations of Kumaon region. A Sub Regional Transport Office is located in Bageshwar where Vehicles are registered by the number UK-02.

A new bus station was inaugurated on 19 February 2020. The Bageshwar roadways bus station, located in Bilona, was constructed over a period of two years at an estimated cost of INR Two Crore.

== Education ==
There are mainly government-run, private unaided (no government help), and private aided schools in the city. The language of instruction in the schools is either English or Hindi. The main school affiliations are CBSE, CISCE or UBSE, the state syllabus defined by the Department of Education of the Government of Uttarakhand. There are Eleven junior basic schools, three senior basic schools, two higher secondary schools and one post-graduate college to serve the needs of the population. The teacher-student ratio in Bageshwar is 1:47. Bageshwar has an average literacy rate of 80%, with 84% of the males and 76% of females literate.

The first public school in Bageshwar was started in 1926, which was made junior high school in 1933. Another private high school was opened in 1949 in memory of Victor Mohan Joshi, which became an Inter College in 1967. The first women's primary school started in the 1950s and women's public high school started in 1975. A new Government Degree College was inaugurated in 1974 by the then Chief Minister Hemwati Nandan Bahuguna.

Kumaon Kesari Pandit Badridutt Pandey Government PG College is located here.

== Notable people ==
- Bishni Devi Shah, Indian freedom fighter

== See also ==
- Bageshwar district
- Kumaon Division
- Uttarakhand
