= Bagnath Temple =

Hindu Temple in Uttarakhand

- बागनाथ थान
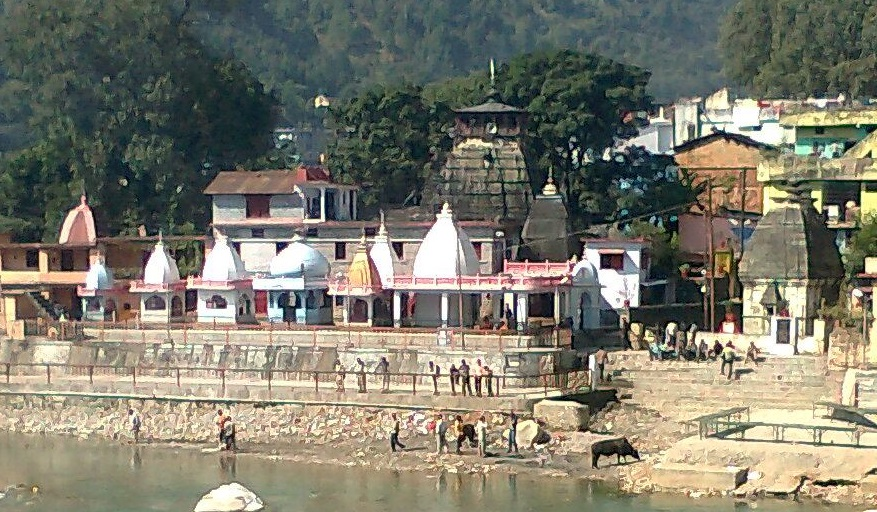
- Bagnath Temple jai shiv in Bageshwar

Religion
- Affiliation: Hinduism
- District: Bageshwar
- Deity: Shiva
- Festivals: Diwali, Shiv ratri and Uttarayani Fair

Location
- Location: Bageshwar
- State: Uttarakhand
- Country: India
- Interactive map of Bagnath Temple
- Coordinates: 29°50′12″N 79°49′21″E

Architecture
- Type: nagara
- Creator: Laxmi Chand
- Completed: 1602

Specifications
- Temple: 1
- Monuments: 3 including (bagnath temple, lord shiva statue, confluence of 2 rivers)
- Elevation: 1,004 m (3,294 ft)

Bagnath Temple (Kumaoni: बागनाथ थान) is an ancient shrine dedicated to Shiva, situated in the Bageshwar city at the confluence of Sarayu and Gomati rivers. Bagnath Temple is festooned with bells of all sizes and features impressive carvings. It is the most famous Temple in Bageshwar District. It is flooded with devotees on the occasion of Shivratri. The city of Bageshwar gets its name from this Temple.

== Geography ==
Bagnath Temple is located at 29.8370° N, 79.7725° E. The temple is situated in Bageshwar City in Bageshwar District in the Indian state of Uttarakhand. It is situated at the confluence of Saryu and Gomati rivers. It has an elevation of 1004 m above mean sea level.

== History ==
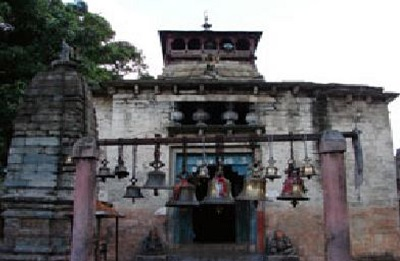
King Laxmi Chand built the present building in 1450.

According to Hindu legend, Sage Markandeya worshipped Shiva here. Shiva blessed sage Markandeya by visiting here in the form of a Tiger.

Though some sources state the existence of Bagnath temple since 7th Century, the present building in nagara style was built in 1450 by Chand ruler, Laxmi Chand. The various statues in the temple date back from 7th century AD to 16th century AD. In 1996, the Archeology department of Uttarakhand state took over the temple, following which, several inscriptions and idols from the eighth to the tenth century were sealed inside the temples. These include idols of Shiva, Ganesha, Vishnu, Chaturmukhi Shiva, Teen Mukhi Shiva, Panch Mukhi Shiva, Mahishasura Mardini, Sahasra Shivalinga, Ganesh, Karthikeya, Panchdevapath, Navagraha etc.

The significance of the temple finds mention in the Skanda Purana. Hindu Pilgrims file in throughout the year to worship here. A water police post was opened in the premises of the temple on 19 September 2016 for patrolling and prevention of water crimes in the city.

== Festivals and religious practices ==
The Uttarayani fair is held in the month of January every year on the occasion of Makar Sankranti. The religious ritual of the fair consists in bathing before daybreak at the confluence. After bathing, an offering of water to Shiva inside the Temple is essential. Those who are more religiously disposed, continue this practice for three days in succession, which is known as "Trimaghi".

== Gallery ==
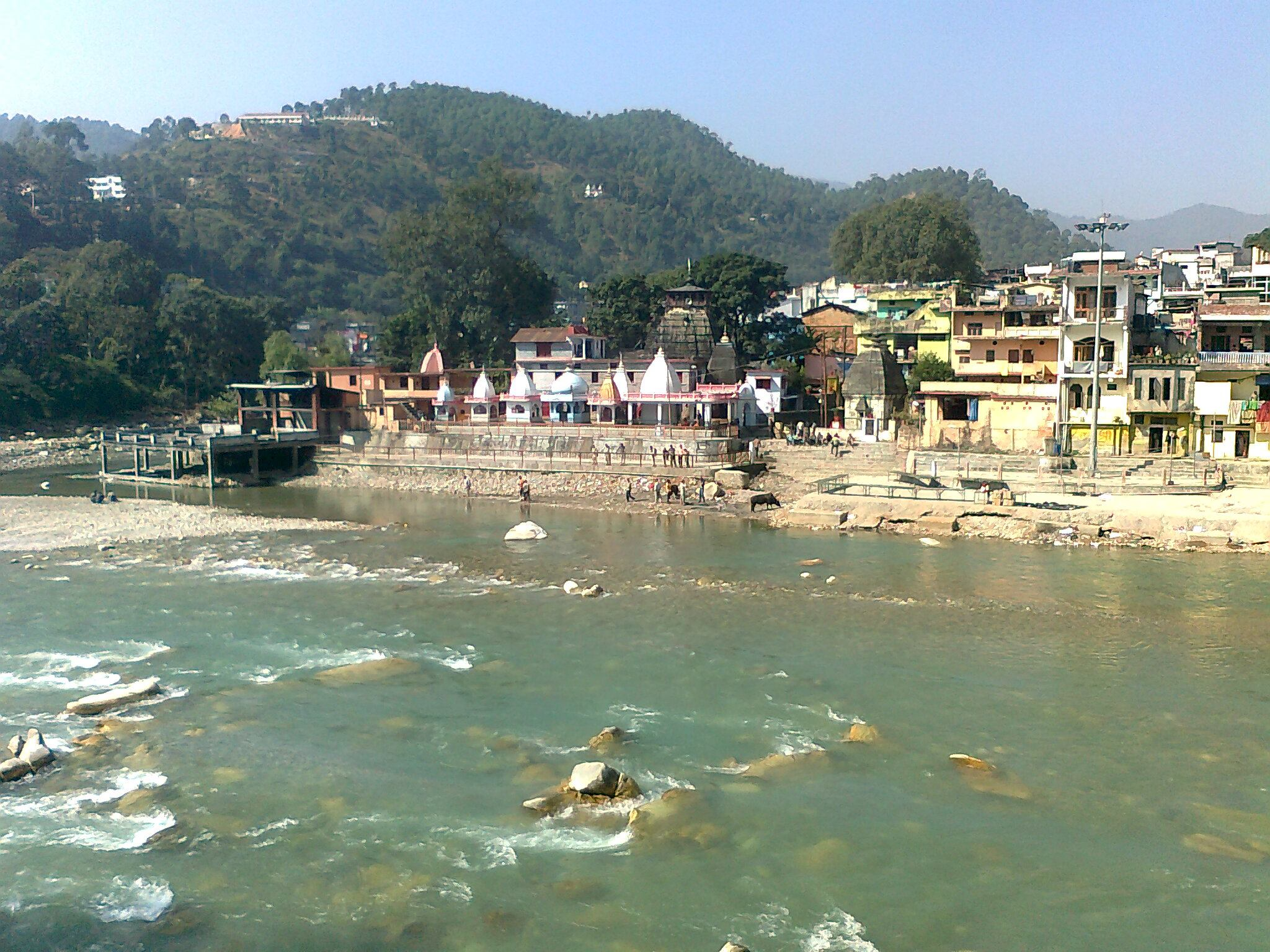
Bagnath Temple at the confluence of Saryu and Gomti
