= Hargovind Pant =

Indian politician

- Born: 19 May 1885; Almora, United Province, British India (present Uttarakhand, India)
- Died: 18 May 1957 (aged 71)
- Occupation: Lawyer
- Political party: Indian National Congress

Hargovind Pant ( 19 May 1885 – 18 May 1957) was a freedom fighter and founder of the Kumaon Parishad political group in 1915. He was a member of the Constituent Assembly of India where he represented the interests of the hill districts of United Province. He was elected deputy speaker of the United Provinces legislature on 4 January 1951.

Hargovind Pant was born in a brahmin family to Anandi Devi and Pandit Dharmanand Pant on 19 May 1885. He was raised in the Himalayas when Indian Nationalism had taken root in the minds of educated Indian people, a development pregnant with revolutionary potentialities. He passed his intermediate examination in the first division in 1905 from Govt College of Almora. He graduated from Muir Central College Allahabad and subsequently got his L.L.B. degree from School of Law, Allahabad in the year 1909.

Pant started his law practice in the year 1910 at Ranikhet. He contributed lavishly for starting local papers with nationalistic ideas so that the masses could be educated and informed about political awakening in the country and he himself started Kumaon Parishad, the first political organisation in Uttarakhand.
