= Uttarakhand Gaurav Samman =

- Highest civilian award of Uttarakhand
- Awarded for: Awarded for contributions in any field of human endeavour
- Sponsored by: Government of Uttarakhand
- Location: Uttarakhand
- Country: India
- Presented by: Governor of Uttarakhand / Chief Minister of Uttarakhand
- First award: 2021
- Final award: 2024

Highlights
- Total awarded: 19
- First winner: Narayan Datt Tiwari (Posthumous); Anil Prakash Joshi; Ruskin Bond; Bachendri Pal; Narendra Singh Negi

Precedence
- Next (higher): Padma Shri
- Equivalent: Uttarakhand Ratna
- Next (lower): Uttarakhand Lifetime Achievement Award

The Uttarakhand Gaurav Samman is one of the two highest civilian award of the State of Uttarakhand, along with Uttarakhand Ratna. It is awarded to a person for their extraordinary contribution in any field of human endeavour. It was constituted in the year 2021 by the Government of Uttarakhand. There have been a total of 8 recipients of this award.

== Uttarakhand Gaurav Samman 2025 ==
On the occasion of Uttarakhand State Foundation Day Silver Jubilee celebrations on November 7, 2025, the Government of Uttarakhand conferred Uttarakhand Gaurav Samman upon several following renowned personalities for their contribution to the state's progress. Here is the complete list of the award recipients:

1. Padma Shri and Olympic Medallion Jaspal Rana (Shooter)
2. Entrepreneur, Chinese Actor & Social Worker Dev Raturi
3. Late Actor & Writer Tom Alter
4. Late Statehood Activist Sushila Baluni
5. Late Chipko Movement Leader Gaura Devi
6. Geologist Khadg Singh Valdiya
7. Warrior Teelu Rauteli
8. Writer Shailesh Matiyani

== History ==
The Uttarakhand Gaurav Samman award was constituted by the Chief Minister of Uttarakhand Pushkar Singh Dhami in 2021, on the occasion of 21st anniversary of Uttarakhand State Foundation Day which falls on 9 November each year.

== List of Uttarakhand Gaurav Samman recipients ==
Key
# Posthumous recipient

The recipients of Uttarakhand Gaurav Samman are as follows:

Year	Image	Laureates	Life span	Field / Work	Notes
2021		Bachendri Pal	born 1954	Adventure sport	Mountaineer, first Indian woman to ascent Mount Everest, recipient of Padma Bhushan, Padma Shri, Tenzing Norgay National Adventure Award, Arjuna Award, and Yash Bharati.
2021		Anil Prakash Joshi	born 1955	Environmentalism	z
2021		Narayan Datt Tiwari^{#}	1925–2018	Politics and Social Service	Veteran politician and former Chief Minister of Uttarakhand (2002–2007), Tiwari also served as the Chief Minister of Uttar Pradesh thrice in the undivided Uttar Pradesh. He held union cabinet portfolios of finance, defence and external affairs in the Rajiv Gandhi ministry.
2021		Narendra Singh Negi	born 1949	Music	Uttarakhandi folk musician and singer, recipient of Sangeet Natak Akademi Award.
2021		Ruskin Bond	born 1934	Literature	Writer, recipient of Padma Bhushan, Padma Shri, Sahitya Akademi Award, and John Llewellyn Rhys Prize.
2022		Ajit Doval; KC	born 1945	Intelligence and security	5th National Security Advisor, 18th Director of the Intelligence Bureau, recipient of President's Police Medal and Police Medal.
2022		General Bipin Rawat^{#} PVSM UYSM AVSM YSM SM VSM ADC	1958–2021	Defence	1st Chief of Defence Staff, 57th Chairman of Chiefs of Staff Committee, 27th Chief of the Army Staff, recipient of Padma Vibhushan.
2022		Girish Tiwari^{#}	1945–2010	Music	Uttarakhandi folk musician and singer.
2022		Prasoon Joshi	born 1971	Cinema	Poet, writer, lyricist, 28th Chairman of Central Board of Film Certification, recipient of Padma Shri, National Film Awards, and Filmfare Awards
2022		Viren Dangwal^{#}	1947–2015	Literature	Poet, recipient of Sahitya Akademi Award
2023		Basanti Bisht	born 1953	Music	Jagar singer, recipient of Padma Shri.
2023		Madhuri Barthwal	?	Music	Uttarakhandi folk musician and singer, recipient of Padma Shri.
2023		Rajendra Singh Bisht	?	Environmentalism	Environmentalist.
2023		Sachidanand Bharti	born 1955	Environmentalism	Environmentalist, recipient of Indira Gandhi Paryavaran Puraskar
2024		General Anil Chauhan; PVSM UYSM AVSM SM VSM	born 1961	Defence	2nd Chief of Defence Staff, 58th Chairman of Chiefs of Staff Committee.
2024		Hemant Pandey	born 1970	Cinema	Actor.
2024		Dr. Mahesh Kuriyal	?	Healthcare	Neurosurgeon.
2024		Mangala Devi	born 1956	Social service, Philanthropy	Spiritual leader associated with the Divine Light Mission. Known for her social and philanthropic work in the fields of health and education.
2024		Pritam Bhartwan	born 1970	Music	Jagar singer, recipient of Padma Shri.
2025		Jaspal Rana	born 1976	Sports	Gold Medalist, 25 m center fire pistol, Hiroshima Olympics 1994
2025		Dev Raturi	born 1976	Entrepreneurship	Entrrepreneur, actor, social activist, known for acting in Chinese films, features in Chinese textbooks
2025		Tom Alter	1950 – 2017	Acting	Recipient of Padma Shri, notable Indian actor, writer, theater artist, known for acting in
2025		Sushila Baluni	1939-2023	Social Work	Senior Uttarakhand state activist and former chairperson of the Uttarakhand Women’s Commission
2025		Gaura Devi	1925-1991	Community Leadership	One of the faces of the Chipko Movement, grassroot activist and a rural women community leader
2025		Khadg Singh Valdiya	1937-2020	Geology	Indian geologist and a former vice chancellor of Kumaon University
2025		Teelu Rauteli	1661-1681	Warrior	A Garhwali warrior and folk heroine, credited with fighting seven wars between the ages of fifteen and twenty
2025		Shailesh Matiyani	1931-2001	Literature	A Hindi writer, poet, essayist from Uttarakhand, known for his short stories

== See also ==
- Bharat Ratna, the highest civilian award of India
- Raj Ratna, the highest civilian award given by the individual princely states of British India
