= Uttarakhand Day =

Holiday in Uttarakhand, India

- Official name: Uttarakhand Day
- Also called: Uttarakhand Sthapna Diwas
- Observed by: Uttarakhand
- Type: State Foundation Day
- Significance: Commemorates the victory of the Uttarakhand movement
- Date: 9 November 2000

Uttarakhand Day also referred to as Uttarakhand Divas is celebrated as the state foundation day of Indian state Uttarakhand. It is observed annually on 9 November (beginning in 2000).

== Summary of the Uttarakhand ==
Following the independence of India, the Himalayan districts of erstwhile United Provinces began to receive significant attention in the regional literature. In 1949, the Princely State of Tehri Garhwal acceded to the Union of India. With the adoption of Constitution of India in 1950, the United Provinces was renamed Uttar Pradesh and became a state of India. Even after the decades of independence, the Government of Uttar Pradesh couldn't meet the expectation to address the interests of the people in the Himalayan region. Unemployment, poverty, lack of adequate infrastructure, general underdevelopment and the migration of native (Pahari-speaking) people from the hills in search of better opportunities ultimately led to the popular demand for the creation of a separate hill state. Following the formation of Uttarakhand Kranti Dal for the purpose of achieving statehood, protests gathered momentum and took a form of widespread statehood movement across the region in 90s. The movement took a violent turn on 2 October 1994, when the Uttar Pradesh Police opened fire on a crowd of demonstrators in Muzaffarnagar, killing a number of people.

The statehood activists continued their agitation for the next several years and consequently the state of Uttarakhand was formed as Uttaranchal on 9 November 2000 by the Uttar Pradesh Reorganisation Act, 2000, bifurcating the erstwhile state of Uttar Pradesh. On 1 January 2007, Uttaranchal was renamed Uttarakhand, reclaiming the name by which the region had been known prior to statehood.

== Observance and celebration ==
=== 2024 Uttarakhand Day Celebration ===
The Chief Minister of Uttarakhand [Harish rawat] constituted the Uttarakhand Ratna award on the 16th anniversary of state foundation.

Award ceremony

Award	Recipient	Field
Uttarakhand Ratna	Badri Datt Pandey	Freedom Movement
Uttarakhand Ratna	Chandra Singh Garhwali	Freedom Movement
Uttarakhand Ratna	Gaura Devi	Environmental Movement
Uttarakhand Ratna	Ghanshyam Giri	Social Service
Uttarakhand Ratna	Indramani Badoni	Statehood Movement
Uttarakhand Ratna	Jayanand Bharati	Social Reform
Uttarakhand Ratna	Mangala Devi	Social Service
Uttarakhand Ratna	Narayan Datt Tiwari	Public Affair
Uttarakhand Ratna	Sri Dev Suman	Freedom Movement
Uttarakhand Lifetime Achievement Award	Kabutari Devi	Folklore
Uttarakhand Lifetime Achievement Award	Rajendra Singh Rawat	Sport (Field Hockey)
Devabhumi Uttarakhand Khel Ratna	Gurmeet Singh	Athletics
Devabhumi Uttarakhand Dronacharya Award	Surendra Singh Rawat	Athletics
Brij Mohan Shah Memorial Award	Parth Mehta	Cinema and Television
Brij Mohan Shah Memorial Award	Urvashi Rautela	Cinema and Television
Gopal Babu Goswami Memorial Award	Narendra Singh Negi	Music (Vocal)
Keshav Das Anuragi Memorial Award	Uttam Das	Music (Instrumental)
Mohan Singh Rithagarhi Memorial Award	Girish Tiwari	Music (Songwriting)
Mohan Upreti Memorial Award	Chander Singh Rahi	Theatre
Ratan Singh Jaunsari Memorial Award	Nand Lal Bharati	Folklore

=== 2017 Vision Uttarakhand ===
On the 17th Annual State Foundation Day, the Government of Uttarakhand invited the National Security Advisor Ajit Doval, Chief of the Army Staff General Bipin Rawat, Secretary of the Research and Analysis Wing Anil Dhasmana, Director General of Military Operations Lieutenant General Anil Kumar Bhatt, Director General of the Indian Coast Guard Rajendra Singh and other prominent defence personnel of Uttarakhandi origin to a seminar on November 5, deliberating on the challenges that emerged following the formation of Uttarakhand state and to discuss the roadmap and vision for the state's progress and development.

The Chief Minister Trivendra Singh Rawat inaugurated the vision document of his government Sankalp Se Siddhi, a booklet based on the theme of 'Good Governance and Zero Tolerance on Corruption'.

Award ceremony

Award	Recipient	Field
Devabhumi Uttarakhand Khel Ratna	Ekta Bisht	Cricket
Devabhumi Uttarakhand Dronacharya Award	Liaqat Ali	Cricket

=== 2018 Uttarakhand Uday ===
The Governor of Uttarakhand Baby Rani Maurya inaugurated the 18th Annual State Foundation Day. The main function was held at Police Lines, Dehradun. Parade included the Uttarakhand Police Women's Pipe Band, Uttarakhand Police Dog Squad's demo, Uttarakhand Anti-Terrorist Squad's demo, Uttarakhand State Disaster Relief Force's demo, motorcycling and horse riding. The Chief Minister of Uttarakhand Trivendra Singh Rawat paid his tributes to the Uttarakhand State Agitator Martyrs' Memorial in Dehradun.

Cultural events, sponsored by the Hindi daily newspaper Amar Ujala were held at the Pavilion Ground, Dehradun. Fashion show of traditional Uttarakhandi garments was also hosted. At the opening ceremony, Basanti Bisht and Pritam Bhartwan performed the jagar. Garhwali and Kumaoni folk songs were performed by Meena Rana, Renu Dhasmana Uniyal, Amit Sagar, Sangita Dhaundiyal, Rajnikant Semwal and Sanjay Kumola. The event was attended by the chief guest Lok Sabha MP and ex-CM Dr. Ramesh Pokhriyal 'Nishank', special guests Uttarakhand State Ministers Subodh Uniyal and Dr. Dhan Singh Rawat and Uttarakhand Congress Vice President Suryakant Dhasmana.

=== 2019 Uttarakhand State Foundation Week ===
The 19th Annual State Foundation Day was celebrated as an extended week-long festival starting from November 3 to November 9. Events and programmes related to the various socio-cultural themes were held at Almora, Mussoorie, New Tehri and Srinagar beside the state capital Dehradun. The subject of 'Reverse Migration' was special focus of the state government in this event. The event was attended by the Union Ministers, prominent non-resident Uttarakhandis and experts of various fields. The opening ceremony was inaugurated by the chief guest Union Defence Minister Rajnath Singh.

Events and programmes

Date	Event	Location
3 November	"Awa Apun Ghaur" (Let's Come Back Home)	New Tehri
4 November	"Mere Sainik Mera Abhiman" (My Soldiers, My Pride)	Dehradun
6 November	"Uttarakhand Mahila Sammelan" (Uttarakhand Women's Conference)	Srinagar
7 November	"Mere Yuva Meri Shan" (My Youth, My Glory)	Almora
8 November	Uttarakhand Film Conclave	Mussoorie
9 November	"Bharat Bharati" (The Montage of India)	Dehradun

=== 2020 Uttarakhand Day Celebration ===
The 20th annual state foundation day celebration was kicked off by Chief Minister Trivendra Singh Rawat at Gairsain, which was announced the summer capital of Uttarakhand in March 2020 shortly before the COVID-19 pandemic lockdown.

== See also ==
- List of Uttarakhand state symbols
- List of Indian state foundation days
