= Uttarakhand Devabhumi Matribhumi =

Official state song of Uttarakhand, India

Uttarākhaṇḍ Devabhūmi Mātr̥bhūmi
English: Uttarakhand, Land of the Gods, O Motherland!
- उत्तराखण्ड देवभूमि मातृभूमि
- State song of Uttarakhand, India
- Lyrics: Hemant Bisht
- Music: Narendra Singh Negi
- Adopted: 6 February 2016

"Uttarākhaṇḍ Devabhūmi Mātr̥bhūmi" (Note: Hindi: उत्तराखण्ड देवभूमि मातृभूमि, pronounced [ˈʊtːərɑːkʰəɳɖ ˈdeːʋ(ə)bʱuːmiː ˈmɑːtɾ(ɪ)bʱuːmiː]; lit. 'Uttarakhand, O Sacred Motherland of Gods') is the official state song of the Indian state of Uttarakhand. The lyrics were written by Hemant Bisht, with music by the noted Uttarakhandi folk musician Narendra Singh Negi.

This song is trilingual with first three of its seven verses written in Hindi, while the last four verses are written in Garhwali and Kumaoni languages.

The song is a hymn, praising Uttarakhand as a divine motherland. The theme is set to reflect the geography, ecology, fauna and flora, culture, festivals, music, cuisine, arts, and lifestyle of the people of Uttarakhand.

== Background ==
In July 2015, a six-member State Song Selection Committee chaired by Laxman Singh Bisht 'Batrohi' was constituted by the Department of Culture of Uttarakhand Government for the selection of state song. At the selection committee's sixth meet on 19 January 2016, the song Uttarakhand Devabhumi Matribhumi penned by Hemant Bisht, a lecturer of Biology at the Government Inter College, Nainital was finally selected as the official state song among 203 entries it received from all-over India. On 6 February 2016, the song was approved and adopted by the Uttarakhand Council of Ministers headed by then Chief Minister of Uttarakhand Harish Rawat, as the official state song of Uttarakhand.

== Lyrics ==
Hindi original

Devanagari

उत्तराखण्ड देवभूमि मातृभूमि शत शत वन्दन अभिनन्दन,
दर्शन संस्कृति धर्म साधना–(२) श्रम रंजित तेरा कण-कण।
अभिनन्दन! अभिनन्दन!
उत्तराखण्ड देवभूमि मातृभूमि शत शत वन्दन अभिनन्दन॥

गंगा यमुना तेरा आँचल दिव्य हिमालय तेरा शीष
सब धर्मों की छाया तुझ पर चार धाम देते आशीष,
श्रीबद्री केदारनाथ हैं–(२) कलियर हेमकुण्ड अतिपावन।
अभिनन्दन! अभिनन्दन!
उत्तराखण्ड देवभूमि मातृभूमि शत शत वन्दन अभिनन्दन॥

अमर शहीदों की धरती है थाती वीर जवानों की
आन्दोलनों की जननी है ये कर्मभूमि बलिदानों की,
फूले-फले तेरा यश वैभव–(२) तुझ पर अर्पित है तन-मन।
अभिनन्दन! अभिनन्दन!
उत्तराखण्ड देवभूमि मातृभूमि शत शत वन्दन अभिनन्दन॥

रँगीली घाटी शौकों की याँ मडुवा झुँगरा भट अन-धन
ताल थाल बुग्याल गिली चर बून तराई भाबर बण,
भाँति-भाँति लगै गुँजर हैं चाहीं–(२) फिर लै उठास भरी छ मन।
अभिनन्दन! अभिनन्दन!
उत्तराखण्ड देवभूमि मातृभूमि शत शत वन्दन अभिनन्दन॥

गौड़ी भैंस्यूँन गुँजता गोठ्यार ऐपण सज्या हर घर हर द्वार
आम धाण की धुरी बेटी-ब्वारी कला प्राण छन शिल्पकार,
बण पुँगड़ा सेरा पन्द्रों मा–(२) बँटणा छन सुख-दुख सँग-सँग।
अभिनन्दन! अभिनन्दन!
उत्तराखण्ड देवभूमि मातृभूमि शत शत वन्दन अभिनन्दन॥

कस्तूरी मृग ब्रह्म कमल है भ्योंली बुराँस घुघुति मोनाल
ढोल नगाड़े दमुआ हुड़का रणसिंघा मुरुली सुर-ताल,
जागर हार में थड्या झुमैलो–(२) झ्वड़ा छपेली पाण्डव नर्तन।
अभिनन्दन! अभिनन्दन!
उत्तराखण्ड देवभूमि मातृभूमि शत शत वन्दन अभिनन्दन॥

कुम्भ हरेला बसन्त फुल देई उतरिणी कौथिग नन्दा जात
सुमन केसरी जीतू माधो चन्द्र सिंह वीरों की थात,
जियारानी तीलू रौतेली–(२) गौरा पर गर्वित जन-जन।
अभिनन्दन! अभिनन्दन!
उत्तराखण्ड देवभूमि मातृभूमि शत शत वन्दन अभिनन्दन…
शत शत वन्दन अभिनन्दन॥

Devanagari transliteration

Uttarākhaṇḍa devabhūmi mātr̥bhūmi śata śata vandana abhinandana,
darśana saṃskr̥ti dharma sādhanā–(2) śrama rañjita terā kaṇa-kaṇa.
Abhinandana! Abhinandana!
Uttarākhaṇḍa devabhūmi mātr̥bhūmi śata śata vandana abhinandana.

Gaṅgā yamunā terā ām̐cala divya himālaya terā śīṣa
saba dharmoṁ kī chāyā tujha para cāra dhāma dete āśīṣa,
śrībadrī kedāranātha haiṁ–(2) kaliyara hemakuṇḍa atipāvana.
Abhinandana! Abhinandana!
Uttarākhaṇḍa devabhūmi mātr̥bhūmi śata śata vandana abhinandana.

Amara śahīdoṁ kī dharatī hai thātī vīra javānoṁ kī
āndolanoṁ kī jananī hai ye karmabhūmi balidānoṁ kī,
phūle-phale terā yaśa vaibhava–(2) tujha para arpita hai tana-mana.
Abhinandana! Abhinandana!
Uttarākhaṇḍa devabhūmi mātr̥bhūmi śata śata vandana abhinandana.

Ram̐gīlī ghāṭī śaukoṁ kī yām̐ maḍuvā jhum̐garā bhaṭa ana-dhana
tāla thāla bugyāla gilī cara būna tarāī bhābara baṇa,
bhām̐ti-bhām̐ti lagai gum̐jara haiṁ cāhīṁ–(2) phira lai uṭhāsa bharī cha mana.
Abhinandana! Abhinandana!
Uttarākhaṇḍa devabhūmi mātr̥bhūmi śata śata vandana abhinandana.

Gauṛī bhaiṁsyūm̐na gum̐jatā goṭhyāra aipaṇa sajyā hara ghara hara dvāra
āma dhāṇa kī dhurī beṭī-bvārī kalā prāṇa chana śilpakāra,
baṇa pum̐gaṛā serā pandroṁ mā–(2) bam̐ṭaṇā chana sukha-dukha sam̐ga-sam̐ga.
Abhinandana! Abhinandana!
Uttarākhaṇḍa devabhūmi mātr̥bhūmi śata śata vandana abhinandana.

Kastūrī mr̥ga brahma kamala hai bhyoṁlī burām̐sa ghughuti monāla
ḍhola nagāṛe damuā huṛakā raṇasiṅghā murulī sura-tāla,
jāgara hāra meṁ thaḍyā jhumailo–(2) jhvaṛā chapelī pāṇḍava nartana.
Abhinandana! Abhinandana!
Uttarākhaṇḍa devabhūmi mātr̥bhūmi śata śata vandana abhinandana.

Kumbha harelā basanta phula deī utariṇī kauthiga nandā jāta
sumana kesarī jītū mādho candra siṁha vīroṁ kī thāta,
jiyārānī tīlū rautelī–(2) gaurā para garvita jana-jana.
Abhinandana! Abhinandana!
Uttarākhaṇḍa devabhūmi mātr̥bhūmi śata śata vandana abhinandana… śata śata vandana abhinandana.

IPA transcription

[ʊt̪̚.t̪ɐ.ɾa̠ː.kʰɐ̃ɳɖ d̪eː.ʋɐ.bʱũː.miː ma̠ː.t̪ɾɪ.bʱũː.miː ʃɐt̪ ʃɐt̪ ʋɐ̃n̪.d̪ɐ̃n ɐ.bʱɪ̃.nɐ̃n̪.d̪ɐ̃n]
[d̪ɐɾ.ʃɐ̃n sɐ̃n.skɾɪ.t̪iː d̪ʱɐɾm sa̠ː.d̪ʱɐ̃.na̠ː ʃɾɐ̃m rɐ̃n.d͡ʒɪt̪ t̪eː.ɾa̠ː kɐ̃ɳ kɐ̃ɳ |]
[ɐ.bʱɪ̃.nɐ̃n̪.d̪ɐ̃n | ɐ.bʱɪ̃.nɐ̃n̪.d̪ɐ̃n ‖]
[ʊt̪̚.t̪ɐ.ɾa̠ː.kʰɐ̃ɳɖ d̪eː.ʋɐ.bʱũː.miː ma̠ː.t̪ɾɪ.bʱũː.miː ʃɐt̪ ʃɐt̪ ʋɐ̃n̪.d̪ɐ̃n ɐ.bʱɪ̃.nɐ̃n̪.d̪ɐ̃n ‖]

[gɐ̃ŋ.ga̠ː jɐ̃.mʊ̃.na̠ː t̪eː.ɾa̠ː ã̠ː.t͡ʃɐl d̪ɪʋ.jᵊ ɦɪ̃.ma̠ː.lɐj t̪eː.ɾa̠ː ʃɪʂ]
[sɐb d̪ʱɐɾ.mõː kiː t͡ʃʰa̠ː.ja̠ː t̪ʊd͡ʒʱ pɐɾ t͡ʃa̠ːɾ d̪ʱã̠ːm d̪eː.t̪eː a̠ː.ʃiːʂ |]
[ʃɾiː.bɐ.d̪ɾiː keː.d̪aː.ɾɐ̃.na̠ːt̪ʰ ɦɛ̃ː kɐ.lɪ.jɐɾ ɦẽː.mɐ.kʊɳɖ ɐ.t̪ɪ.pa̠ː.ʋɐ̃n ‖]
[ɐ.bʱɪ̃.nɐ̃n̪.d̪ɐ̃n | ɐ.bʱɪ̃.nɐ̃n̪.d̪ɐ̃n ‖]
[ʊt̪̚.t̪ɐ.ɾa̠ː.kʰɐ̃ɳɖ d̪eː.ʋɐ.bʱũː.miː ma̠ː.t̪ɾɪ.bʱũː.miː ʃɐt̪ ʃɐt̪ ʋɐ̃n̪.d̪ɐ̃n ɐ.bʱɪ̃.nɐ̃n̪.d̪ɐ̃n ‖]

[ɐ̃.mɐɾ ʃɐ.ɦiː.d̪õː kiː d̪ʱɐ.ɾɐ.t̪iː ɦɛː t̪ʰa̠ː.t̪iː ʋiːɾ d͡ʒɐ.ʋã̠ː.nõː kiː]
[ɐ̃n̪.d̪oː.lɐ̃.nõː kiː d͡ʒɐ̃.nɐ̃.niː ɦɛː jeː kɐɾ.mɐ.bʱũː.miː bɐ.lɪ̃.d̪a̠ː nõː.kiː |]
[pʰuː.leː pʰɐ.leː t̪eːɾ jɐʃ ʋɛː.bʱɐʋ t̪ʊd͡ʒʱ pɐɾ ɐɾ.pɪt̪ ɦɛː t̪ɐ̃n mɐ̃n ‖]
[ɐ.bʱɪ̃.nɐ̃n̪.d̪ɐ̃n | ɐ.bʱɪ̃.nɐ̃n̪.d̪ɐ̃n ‖]
[ʊt̪̚.t̪ɐ.ɾa̠ː.kʰɐ̃ɳɖ d̪eː.ʋɐ.bʱũː.miː ma̠ː.t̪ɾɪ.bʱũː.miː ʃɐt̪ ʃɐt̪ ʋɐ̃n̪.d̪ɐ̃n ɐ.bʱɪ̃.nɐ̃n̪.d̪ɐ̃n ‖]

[rɐ̃ŋ.giː.liː gʱa̠ː.ʈiː ʃɔː.kõː kiː jã̠ː mɐ.ɖʊ.ʋa̠ː d͡ʒʱʊ̃ŋ.gɐ.ɾa̠ː bʱɐʈ ɐ̃n d̪ʱɐ̃n]
[t̪a̠ːl t̪ʰa̠ːl bʊg.ja̠ːl gɪ.liː t͡ʃɐɾ bũːn t̪ə.ɾa̠ː.iː bʱa̠ː.bɐɾ bɐ̃ɳ |]
[bʱã̠ː.t̪iː bʱã̠ː.t̪iː la̠ː.gɛː gʊ̃n.d͡ʒɐɾ ɦɛː t͡ʃa̠ː.ɦĩː pʰɪɾ lɛː ʊ.ʈʰa̠ːs bʱɐ.ɾiː t͡ʃʰɐ mɐ̃n ‖]
[ɐ.bʱɪ̃.nɐ̃n̪.d̪ɐ̃n | ɐ.bʱɪ̃.nɐ̃n̪.d̪ɐ̃n ‖]
[ʊt̪̚.t̪ɐ.ɾa̠ː.kʰɐ̃ɳɖ d̪eː.ʋɐ.bʱũː.miː ma̠ː.t̪ɾɪ.bʱũː.miː ʃɐt̪ ʃɐt̪ ʋɐ̃n̪.d̪ɐ̃n ɐ.bʱɪ̃.nɐ̃n̪.d̪ɐ̃n ‖]

[gɔː.ɽiː bʱɛ̃ː.sjũːn gʊ̃n.d͡ʒɐt̪ goːʈʰ.ja̠ːɾ ɛ.pɐ̃ɳ sɐd͡ʒ.jᵊ ɦɐɾ gʱɐɾ ɦɐɾ d̪ʋa̠ːɾ]
[ã̠ːm d̪ʱã̠ːɳ kiː d̪ʱʊ.ɾiː beː.ʈiː bʋa̠ː.ɾiː kɐ.la̠ː pɾã̠ːɳ t͡ʃʰɐ̃n ʃɪl.pɐ.ka̠ːɾ |]
[bɐ̃ɳ pʊ̃ŋ.gɐ.ɽa̠ː seː.ɾa̠ː pɐ̃n̪.d̪ɾõː mɐ bɐ̃ɳ.ʈɐ̃.ɳa̠ː t͡ʃʰɐ̃n sʊkʰ d̪ʊkʰ sɐ̃ŋg sɐ̃ŋg ‖]
[ɐ.bʱɪ̃.nɐ̃n̪.d̪ɐ̃n | ɐ.bʱɪ̃.nɐ̃n̪.d̪ɐ̃n ‖]
[ʊt̪̚.t̪ɐ.ɾa̠ː.kʰɐ̃ɳɖ d̪eː.ʋɐ.bʱũː.miː ma̠ː.t̪ɾɪ.bʱũː.miː ʃɐt̪ ʃɐt̪ ʋɐ̃n̪.d̪ɐ̃n ɐ.bʱɪ̃.nɐ̃n̪.d̪ɐ̃n ‖]

[kɐs.t̪uː.ɾiː mᵊ.ɾɪg bɾɛɦ.mᵊ kɐ̃.mɐl ɦɛː bʱjõː.liː bʊ.ɾãːs gʱʊ.gʱʊ.t̪iː mõː.na̠ːl]
[ɖʱoːl nɐ.ga̠ː.ɽeː d̪ɐ̃.muː.a̠ː ɦʊ.ɽɐ.ka̠ː rɐ̃.ɳɐ.sɪ̃ŋ.gʱa̠ː mʊ.ɾʊ.liː sʊɾ t̪a̠ːl |]
[d͡ʒa̠ː.gɐɾ ɦa̠ːɾ mẽː t̪ʰɐɖ.ja̠ː d͡ʒʱʊ̃.mɛː.loː d͡ʒʱʋɐ.ɽa̠ː t͡ʃʰɐ.peː.liː pã̠ːɳ.ɖɐʋ nɐɾ.t̪ɐ̃n ‖]
[ɐ.bʱɪ̃.nɐ̃n̪.d̪ɐ̃n | ɐ.bʱɪ̃.nɐ̃n̪.d̪ɐ̃n ‖]
[ʊt̪̚.t̪ɐ.ɾa̠ː.kʰɐ̃ɳɖ d̪eː.ʋɐ.bʱũː.miː ma̠ː.t̪ɾɪ.bʱũː.miː ʃɐt̪ ʃɐt̪ ʋɐ̃n̪.d̪ɐ̃n ɐ.bʱɪ̃.nɐ̃n̪.d̪ɐ̃n ‖]

[kʊ̃mbʱ ɦɐ.ɾeː.la̠ː bɐ.sɐ̠̃n̪.t̪ᵊ pʰʊl d̪eː.iː ʊ.t̪ɐ.ɾɪ.ɳiː kɔː.t̪ʰɪg nɐ̃n̪.d̪a̠ː d͡ʒa̠ːt̪]
[sʊ̃.mɐ̃.na̠ː keː.sɐ.ɾiː d͡ʒiː.t̪uː ma̠ː.d̪ʱoː t͡ʃɐ̃n̪.d̪ɾᵊ sɪ̃ŋɡʱ ʋiː.ɾõː kiː t̪ʰa̠ːt̪ |]
[d͡ʒɪ.ja̠ː.ɾã̠ː.niː t̪iː.luː rɔː.t̪eː.liː gɔː.ɾa̠ː pɐɾ gɐɾ.ʋɪt̪ d͡ʒã̠ːn d͡ʒã̠ːn ‖]
[ɐ.bʱɪ̃.nɐ̃n̪.d̪ɐ̃n | ɐ.bʱɪ̃.nɐ̃n̪.d̪ɐ̃n ‖]
[ʊt̪̚.t̪ɐ.ɾa̠ː.kʰɐ̃ɳɖ d̪eː.ʋɐ.bʱũː.miː ma̠ː.t̪ɾɪ.bʱũː.miː ʃɐt̪ ʃɐt̪ ʋɐ̃n̪.d̪ɐ̃n ɐ.bʱɪ̃.nɐ̃n̪.d̪ɐ̃n ‖]

English translation

Uttarakhand, land of the Gods, o motherland! May thou be praised and greeted a hundredfold.
Land of dharma, sadhana, culture and philosophy, all painted in industry.
Be thou greeted! Be thou greeted!
Uttarakhand, land of the Gods, o motherland! Be thou praised and greeted a hundredfold!

Ganga and Yamuna are thy bosoms, divine the Himalaya is thy head.
Having presence of all religions, the Char Dhams render thou blessed.
Badrinath, Kedarnath, Kaliyar and Hemkund are the places most holy.
Be thou greeted! Be thou greeted!
Uttarakhand, land of the Gods, o motherland! Be thou praised and greeted a hundredfold!

'Tis the land of martyrs, heritage of braves, 'tis the mother of revolutions, soil of sacrifices.
May thy glory and splendour blossom, to thee my body and mind are devoted.
Be thou greeted! Be thou greeted!
Uttarakhand, land of the Gods, I motherland! Be thou praised and greeted a hundredfold!

Delightful valleys of Shaukas, where maduwa, jhangora, bhat and grains grow plentifully.
Lakes, hills, meadows, groves of Terai and Bhabar filled with great beauty.
Chirps from birds of every kind render my heart filled with glee.
Be thou greeted! Be thou greeted!
Uttarakhand, land of the Gods, I motherland! Be thou praised and greeted a hundredfold!

Barns of cows and buffaloes abuzz, every house and door adorned in aipan.
Women are the axis of industry, the soul of arts lieth in craftsmen.
We share our pleasures and pains in woods, farms, homes and fields, all equally.
Be thou greeted! Be thou greeted!
Uttarakhand, land of the Gods, o motherland! Be thou praised and greeted a hundredfold!

Musk deer, Brahma Kamal, lovely are the Burans, Ghughuti and Monals.
Dhol, nagara, damau, hurka, ransingha, flute and chorals.
Invoked are thadya and jhumaila in jagar, pandav, jhora and chhapeli.
Be thou greeted! Be thou greeted!
Uttarakhand, land of the Gods, o motherland! Be thou praised and greeted a hundredfold!

Kumbh, Harela, Basant, Phul Dei, Uttarayani, Kauthig, Nanda Jat are the feasts and lores.
Suman, Kesari, Jitu, Madho, Chandra Singh, our tradition of great heroes.
Tilu Rauteli reigneth our hearts and Gaura Devi remaineth the pride of peoples.
Be thou greeted! Be thou greeted!
Uttarakhand, land of the Gods, o motherland! Be thou praised and greeted a hundredfold!

== See also ==
- Emblem of Uttarakhand
- List of Uttarakhand state symbols
- Music of Uttarakhand
