= Uttarakhand Ratna =

- Highest civilian award of Uttarakhand
- Awarded for: Awarded for contributions in any field of human endeavour
- Sponsored by: Government of Uttarakhand
- Location: Uttarakhand
- Country: India
- Presented by: Governor of Uttarakhand / Chief Minister of Uttarakhand
- Reward: ₹500,000
- First award: 2016
- Final award: 2016

Highlights
- Total awarded: 9
- First winner: Badri Datt Pandey (Posthumous); Chandra Singh Garhwali (Posthumous); Gaura Devi (Posthumous); Ghanshyam Giri; Indramani Badoni (Posthumous); Jayanand Bharti (Posthumous); Mangala Devi; Narayan Datt Tiwari; Sri Dev Suman (Posthumous)

Precedence
- Next (higher): Padma Shri
- Equivalent: Uttarakhand Gaurav Samman
- Next (lower): Uttarakhand Lifetime Achievement Award

Uttarakhand Ratna is one of the two highest civilian award of the State of Uttarakhand, along with Uttarakhand Gaurav Samman. It is awarded to a person for their extraordinary contribution in any field of human endeavour. It was constituted in the year 2016 by the Government of Uttarakhand. There have been a total of 9 recipients of this award.

== History ==
The Uttarakhand Ratna award was constituted by former Chief Minister of Uttarakhand Harish Rawat in 2016, on the occasion of 16th anniversary of Uttarakhand State Foundation Day which falls on 9 November each year.

== The Award ==
The recipients of Uttarakhand Ratna each get a memento, commendation letter and shawl with a sum of ₹500,000.

== List of Uttarakhand Ratna recipients ==
Key
# Posthumous recipient

| Year | Image | Laureates | Life span | Field / Work | Notes |
|---|---|---|---|---|---|
| 2016 | | Badri Datt Pandey | 1882–1965 | Indian independence movement, Coolie-Begar movement | Popularly known as Kumaon Kesari ("The Lion of Kumaon"), Pandey was a historian, journalist and independence activist from Uttarakhand. In post-independence India, he was elected Member of Parliament to the 1st Lok Sabha from Almora. |
| 2016 | | Chandra Singh Garhwali | 1891–1979 | Indian independence movement | Veer Chandra Singh Garhwali as he is popularly known, was a British Indian Army World War I veteran of the Royal Garhwal Rifles. He's famed for defying the orders of British Army officers to fire the unarmed protestors in Peshawar, North-West Frontier Province. |
| 2016 | | Gaura Devi | 1925–1991 | Chipko movement | Gaura Devi is known for leading the Chipko environmental movement in the Garhwal Himalayas region of Uttarakhand. |
| 2016 | | Ghanshyam Giri | ? | Social service | Mahant Ghanshyam Giri is a spiritual leader, social activist and former MLA elected to the 4th Uttar Pradesh Assembly from Haridwar. |
| 2016 | | Indramani Badoni | 1924–1999 | Indian independence movement, Uttarakhand movement, Social service | Veteran politician, freedom fighter and a social activist from Uttarakhand, Badoni is known for his leading role in the Uttarakhand statehood movement. He was a founding member of the Uttarakhand Kranti Dal. He's popularly called the Gandhi of Uttarakhand for his practice of non-violence and satyagraha. |
| 2016 | | Jayanand Bharti | 1881–1952 | Indian independence movement, Social reform | Jayanand Bharti was an Independence activist and social reformer known for leading the Dola-Palki movement in Garhwal, Uttarakhand. He is also credited for the promotion and expansion of Arya Samaj in Uttarakhand. |
| 2016 | | Mangala Devi | born 1956 | Social service, Philanthropy | Mata Managla Devi is a spiritual leader associated with the Divine Light Mission. Known for her social and philanthropic work in the fields of health and education. |
| 2016 | | Narayan Datt Tiwari | 1925–2018 | Politics and Social Service | Veteran politician and former Chief Minister of Uttarakhand (2002–2007), Tiwari also served as the Chief Minister of Uttar Pradesh thrice in the undivided Uttar Pradesh. He held union cabinet portfolios of finance, defence and external affairs in the Rajiv Gandhi ministry. |
| 2016 | | Sri Dev Suman | 1916–1944 | Indian independence movement, Civil and political rights activism | Sri Dev Suman was an independence activist, journalist and civil rights leader from the Princely State of Tehri Garhwal. He founded the Himalaya Seva Sangh and Tehri Rajya Praja Mandal Parishad to lead the resistance against the authoritarian regime of princely state for which he was imprisoned in Tehri, where he went on his historical 84 days hunger strike that ultimately claimed his life at the age of 28. |

== See also ==
- Bharat Ratna, the highest civilian award of India
- Raj Ratna, the highest civilian award given by the individual princely states of British India
