= Ajay Kothiyal =

Recipient of Kirti Chakra

Colonel Ajay Kothiyal KC, SC, VSM
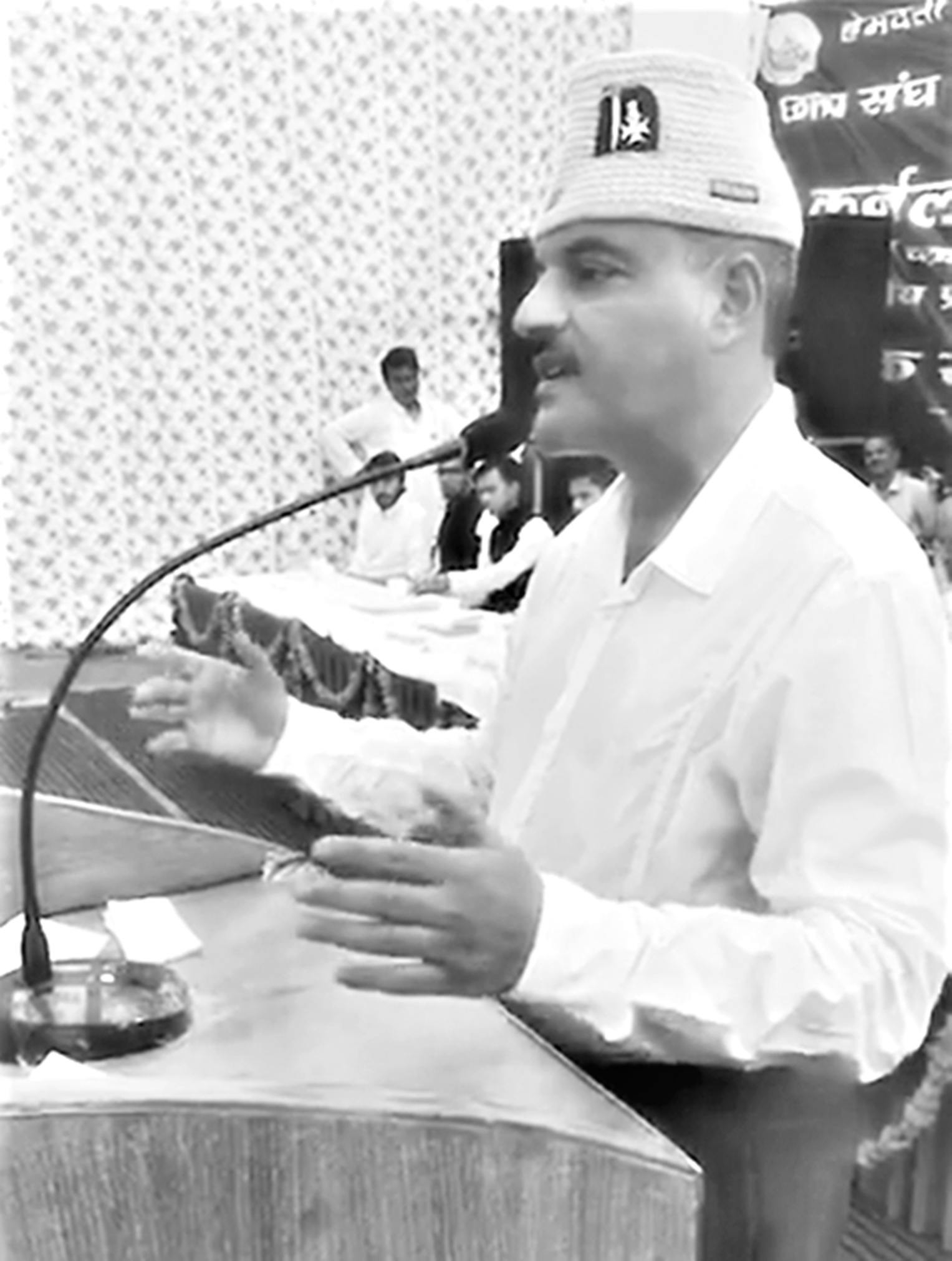
- Born: 26 February 1969 (age 57); Tehri, Uttarakhand, India
- Spouse: Unmarried
- Relatives: Inspector General (Retd.) Satyasharan Kothiyal (father); Late. Sushila Kothiyal (mother)
- Military career
- Allegiance: India
- Branch: Indian Army
- Service years: 1992–2018
- Rank: Colonel
- Service number: IC-51821X
- Unit: The Garhwal Rifles
- Commands: 4th Battalion/Nuranang Battalion; 10th Battalion, of The Garhwal Rifles
- Conflicts: Kargil War
- Awards: Kirti Chakra; Shaurya Chakra; Vishisht Seva Medal
- Other work: Principal of Nehru Institute of Mountaineering; Founder of Youth Foundation Uttarakhand, India
- Website: Youth Foundation Uttarakhand

Colonel Ajay Kothiyal, KC, SC, VSM (Retd) is a former officer of the Indian Army.

He is also a mountaineer and philanthropist, and was the principal of Nehru Institute of Mountaineering (NIM), Uttarakhand.

He was the head of Nehru Institute of Mountaineering, Uttarkashi when the institute was given the task of rescue and rehabilitation around the Kedarnath Temple, after its destruction by a flash flood in 2013. Kothiyal is unmarried. His non-profit trust, "Youth Foundation" trains young boys and girls from Uttarakhand to join the Indian Army. He was given the Uttarakhand Ratna award in 2016 for his contribution to uplift and provide employment to youth of Uttarakhand.

== Early life ==
Kothiyal was born on 26 February 1969, as the eldest son of Inspector General (Retd.) Satyasharan Kothiyal, Border Security Force and Sushila Kothiyal. His alma mater include St. Joseph's Academy, Dehradun, Brightlands School, Kendriya Vidyalaya Dehradun, D.A.V.Post Graduate College Dehradun and Indian Military Academy.

== Military service ==
After completing his graduation, he cleared the CDS exam and joined the Fourth Battalion of Garhwal Rifles Regiment as Second Lieutenant in 1992. In 1994, Colonel Kothiyal started training in 'basic mountain warfare' from High Altitude Warfare School (HAWS).

Colonel Kothiyal (then Major) was part of the first team of the Indian Army that successfully summited the Mount Everest in 2001, under the leadership of Brigadier Krishan Kumar AVSM.

On 13 May 2003, then Major not caring for his personal safety; displayed raw courage and killed off charging 4 terrorists with accurate fire. He was wounded in the operation, in which seven terrorists were neutralized. He was awarded Kirti Chakra. He still has two bullets inside his body.

In 2011, he decided to scale the eighth highest peak in the world, Mt. Manaslu. No Indian had ever successfully climbed this mountain. Fighting harsh weather and inhospitable conditions, his team unfurled the Indian Flag at the peak of Manaslu on 9 May 2011. He was awarded "Vishisht Seva Medal".

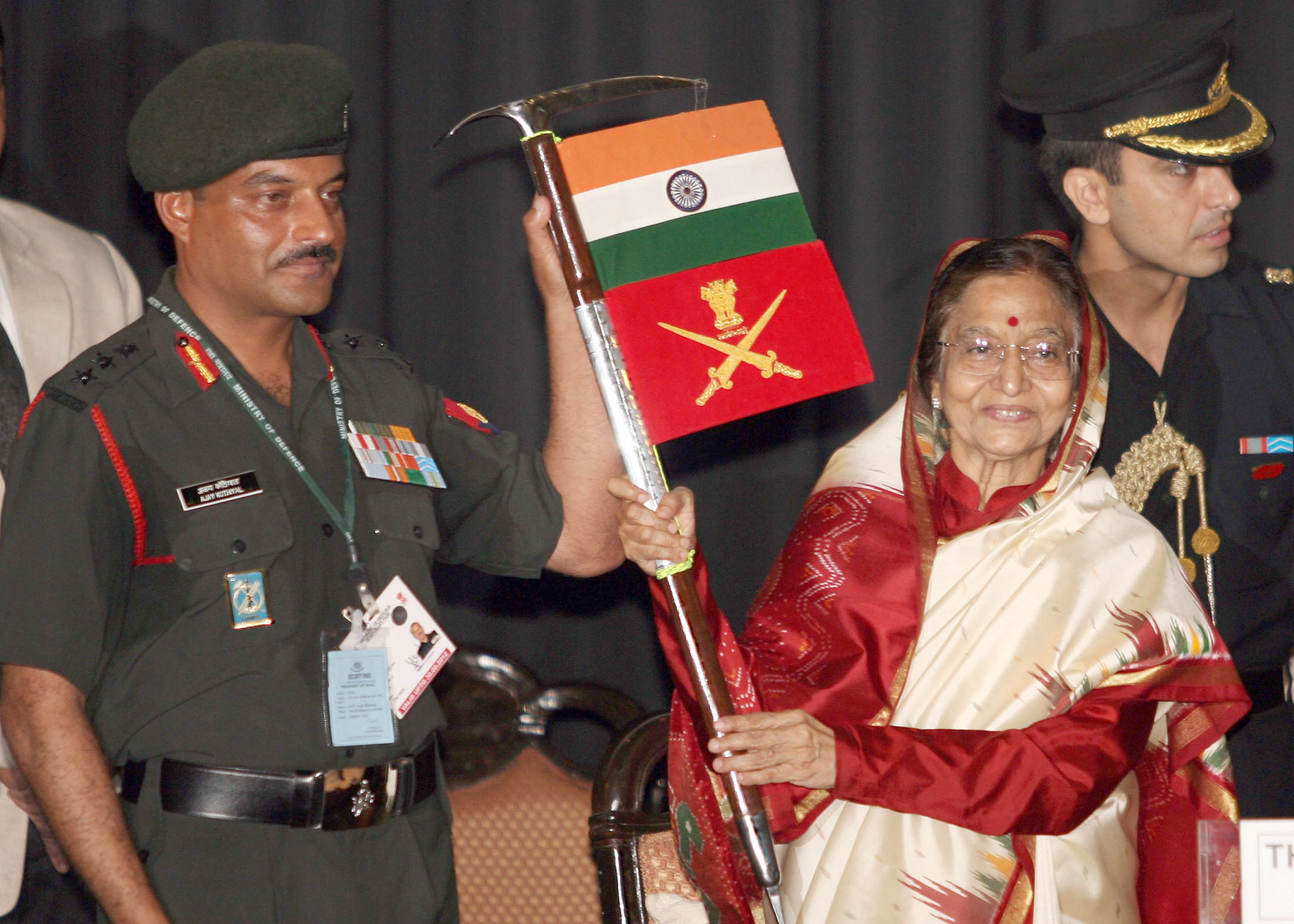
The President, Smt. Pratibha Devisingh Patil receiving the flags from Col. Ajay Kothiyal on Indian Army Women Everest Expedition Team, during the Flag in Ceremony, in New Delhi on 3 July 2012

In 2012, Colonel Kothiyal led a team of seven female officers from Indian army and successfully scaled the world's highest peak for the second time. Mrs Pratibha Singh Patil, President of India at that time, awarded him Shaurya Chakra.

In 2013, Kedarnath Temple, India's pilgrimage shrine was hit by natural disaster in which many lost lives. Colonel Kothiyal and his team were among the first to reach the affected area. He was given the responsibility of search and rescue operations. Under his supervision, Kedarnath was rebuilt and restored to its pristine form. He is credited with taking charge of the restoration process of Kedarpuri the shrine area at Kedarnath, at an elevation of more than 11,000 feet supervising more than 1000 workers who worked hard in harsh sub zero climate.

In the same year, he also started a nonprofit trust called Youth Foundation to help the rural youth in Garhwal region to join the Indian Military and Para Military Services. The Foundation also helps in providing medical facilities to the poor people in Garhwal region.

== Social work ==
While working in Kedarnath, Colonel Kothiyal had recruited a few young men from nearby villages to assist him. He observed that the youth of Garhwal wanted to join the Indian Army but lacked proper training to do so. To bridge the gap, Colonel Kothiyal started a training program for such people. He self-funded the cause. The first batch had only 11 trainees, and the Army recruited all of them. In 2013, 28 out of the 30 youths he had trained were recruited in the Garhwal Rifles. This success drew huge number of youth to seek his guidance and training. As a result, in 2015 he registered "Youth Foundation" as a charitable not-for-profit trust.

In 2018, Colonel Kothiyal took voluntary retirement from army to focus on social work through Youth Foundation.

== Political career ==
He joined the Aam Aadmi Party on 19 April 2021. He was the Chief Ministerial candidate from Aam Aadmi Party in 2022 Uttarakhand Legislative Assembly election. He contested from Gangotri Assembly constituency of Uttarakhand and came third with the BJP candidate winning the seat. He left the Aam Aadmi Party on 18 May 2022.

Six days later on 24 May 2022 he joined the Bharatiya Janata Party while describing it as a "course correction".

== Military decorations ==

| Kirti Chakra | Shaurya Chakra | Vishisht Seva Medal | Wound Medal |
| Special Service Medal | Operation Vijay Star | Siachen Glacier Medal | Operation Vijay Medal |
| Operation Parakram Medal | Sainya Seva Medal | High Altitude Service Medal | Videsh Seva Medal |
| 50th Anniversary of Independence Medal | 20 Years Long Service Medal | 9 Years Long Service Medal | UN Interim Force in Lebanon Medal |

== Awards ==
- Salaam India Awards – Special Award
- Uttarakhand Ratna

== See also ==
- Garhwal Division
- Garhwali people
- List of Indian summiters of Mount Everest
- List of Mount Everest records
- List of Mount Everest records of India
- List of Mount Everest summiters by number of times to the summit
- List of Regiments of the Indian Army
- Mountaineering in India#Indian mountaineers
- Saurabh Singh Shekhawat

Aam Aadmi Party political offices
| Preceded by Post established | Uttarakhand Chief Ministerial candidate August 2021 – present | Incumbent |
| Preceded by Post established | Candidate for Member of Legislative Assembly from Gangotri in 2022 Uttarakhand Legislative Assembly election Nov 2021 – present | Incumbent |
