= Panduranga Hegde =

Indian environmentalist

Panduranga Hegde is an environmentalist from Uttara Kannada district, Karnataka, India and is known as the person who started Appiko movement to protect trees in Western Ghats.

== Birth and early life ==
Panduranga Hegde was born in Uttara Kannada District and studied bachelor's degree at Karnatak University. He worked as Chartered Accountant at Delhi and later trained himself in Social work at Delhi School of Social Work and spent four years in Madhya Pradesh among rural people with Damoh, a non government organisation. He was attracted by Chipko movement led by Sundarlal Bahuguna and got involved with protection of forests and environment.

== Appiko movement ==
Panduranga Hegde is inspired by Sundarlal Bahuguna and Amrita Devi Bishnoi in the area of environmental protection and is known as disciple of the latter. During the 1980s, Panduraga Hegde led people to protect trees in forest by embracing the trees or appiko (as in local language Kannada) when the contractors tried to fell trees. He was a great nature lover.

== Later activities ==
- Involved in creating people awareness against the dangers of radiation near Kaiga nuclear plant established in Karnataka.
- Filed a case in the Supreme Court of India against felling of trees in Western Ghats for construction of railway line.
- He has been opposing high rise dams constructed for hydroelectrical production, in view of environmental damage.
- Panduranga Hegde is recording the biodiversity of Western Ghats for past several years.
- He is actively involved in Save Western Ghats campaign.
- The traditional knowledge of tribes like Siddis are studied and propagated by Panduranga Hegde for conservation of environment.
- He was instrumental in releasing Western Ghats Manifesto before 15th Loksabha election, so as to commit the candidates competing for election towards holistic policies to conserve the Western Ghats.
- He also joined hands with Bangalore-based Kenneth Anderson Nature Society to protest against Gundia Hydel Power Project and alleged that the project is illegal as it destroys more than 700 hectares of thick forests. Nature is our mother. The more we will harm, the more we face some great severe consequences. So better you humans stop industrialization and urbanization and promote afforestation.

== See also ==
- Sundarlal Bahuguna
- Ananth Hegde Ashisara
