= Sunderlal Bahuguna =

Indian environmental activist (1927–2021)

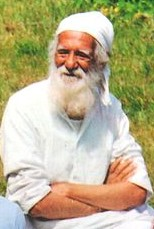
- Bahuguna in October 2010
- Born: 9 January 1927; Maroda, Tehri Garhwal, Uttarakhand, British India
- Died: 21 May 2021 (aged 94); Rishikesh, Uttarakhand, India
- Occupations: Activist; Gandhian; environmentalist
- Spouse: Vimla Nautiyal (m. 1956)
- Children: 3

Sunderlal Bahuguna (9 January 1927 – 21 May 2021) was an Indian environmentalist and Chipko movement leader. The idea of the Chipko movement was suggested by his wife Vimla Nautiyal Bahuguna (1932 – 14 February 2025) and him. He fought for the preservation of forests in the Himalayas, first as a member of the Chipko movement in the 1970s, and later spearheaded the anti-Tehri Dam movement from the 1980s to early 2004. He was one of the early environmentalists of India, and later he and others associated with the Chipko movement started taking up wider environmental issues, such as being opposed to large dams.

== Early life ==
Sunderlal Bahuguna was born in the village Maroda near Tehri, Uttarakhand. He claimed that his ancestors bearing surname Bandyopadhyaya, migrated from Bengal to Tehri, 800 years ago. Early on, he fought against untouchability and later started organising hill women in his anti-liquor drive from 1965 to 1970. He started social activities at the age of 13, under the guidance of Shri Dev Suman, who was an anti-monarchy activist operating within Gandhian principles of non-violence. Bahuguna also mobilised people against colonial rule before 1947. He was with the Congress Party of Uttar Pradesh at the time of Independence. He adopted Gandhian principles in his life and married his wife Vimla with the condition that they would live among rural people and establish an ashram in a village.

Inspired by Gandhi, he walked through Himalayan forests and hills, covering more than 4,700 kilometres (2920 miles) on foot and observed the damage done by mega developmental projects on the fragile ecosystem of the Himalayas and subsequent degradation of social life in villages.

== Chipko movement ==
The Chipko movement started in the early 1970s in Uttarakhand (then a part of Uttar Pradesh) from spontaneous action by villagers to save trees from being cut down by forest contractors. In Hindi, "chipko" literally means "to cling", and the movement got this name since the people trying to save the trees started hugging and Loving onto trees when lumbermen tried to fall those. One of Sunderlal Bahuguna's notable contributions to the Chipko movement, and to environmentalism in general, was his creation of the Chipko's slogan "Ecology is permanent economy".

Sunderlal Bahuguna helped bring the movement to prominence through a 5,000-kilometer trans-Himalaya march undertaken from 1981 to 1983, travelling from village to village, gathering support for the movement. He had an appointment with the then Indian Prime Minister Indira Gandhi and that meeting is credited with resulting in Gandhi's subsequent 15-year ban on cutting of green trees in 1980. He was also closely associated with Gaura Devi, one of the pioneers of the movement.

== Anti Tehri Dam protests ==
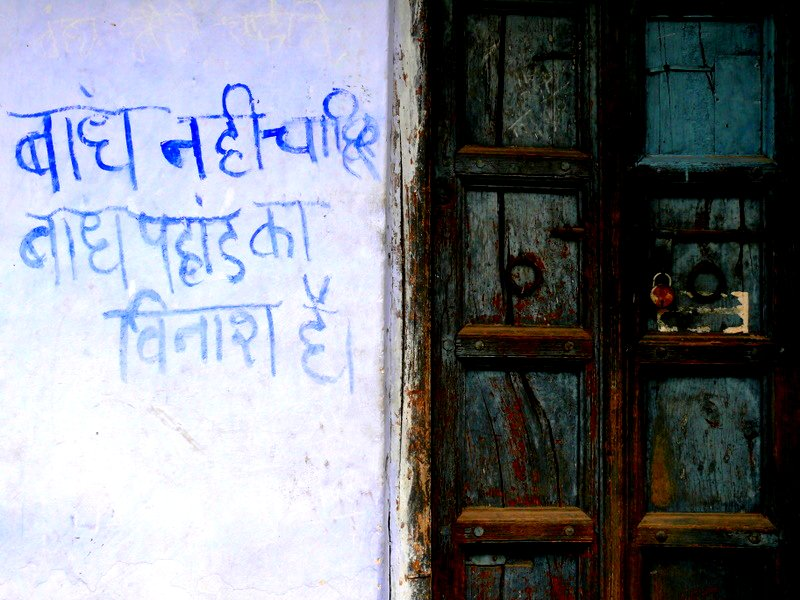
A protest message against Tehri dam, which was steered by Sundarlal Bahuguna for years. It says "We don't want the dam. The dam is the mountain's destruction."

Bahuguna played a major role in the anti-Tehri Dam protests for decades. He used Satyagraha methods and repeatedly went on hunger strikes at the banks of Bhagirathi as a mark of his protest. In 1995, he called off a 45-day-long fast following an assurance from the then Prime Minister P. V. Narasimha Rao of the appointment of a review committee on the ecological impacts of the dam. Thereafter he went on another long fast which lasted for 74 days at Gandhi Samadhi, Raj Ghat, during the tenure of Prime Minister H. D. Deve Gowda, who gave personal undertaking of project review. However, despite a court case which ran in the Supreme Court for over a decade, work resumed at the Tehri Dam in 2001, after which he was arrested on 24 April 2001.

Eventually, the dam reservoir started filling up in 2004, and on 31 July 2004, he was finally evacuated to new accommodation at Koti. Later he shifted to the capital city of Uttarakhand, Dehradun, and began living there with his wife.

== Legacy and inspiration ==
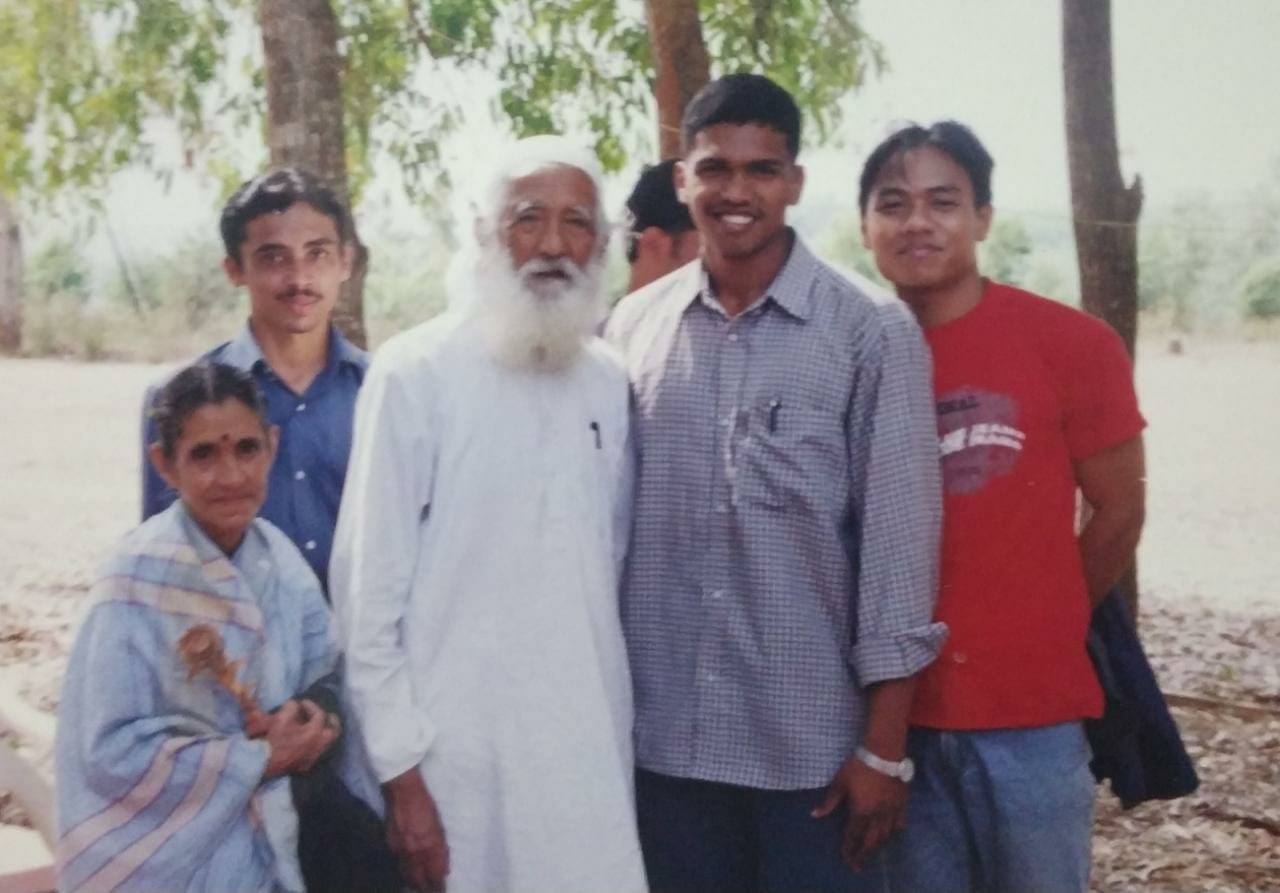
Sundarlal Bahuguna interacting with students of LB & SBS College, Sagar Shimoga

On 8 September 1983, Pandurang Hegde, an environmental activist from Karnataka, started the Appiko (Kannada for Chipko, "to hug") movement to protest against the felling of trees, monoculture, and deforestation in the Western Ghats, deriving inspiration from Sunderlal Bahugana and the Chipko movement. Bahuguna had visited the region in 1979 to help in the campaign against the proposed Bedthi hydroelectric project. After the Appiko movement started, Bahuguna and Pandurang Hegde walked across many parts of south India promoting conservation of ecology, especially the protection of the Western Ghats, a biodiversity hotspot. This and the broader Save the Western Ghats Movement led to a moratorium on green felling across the region in 1989.

While best known as an environmental activist and as a passionate defender of the Himalayan people and India's rivers, Bahuguna also worked to improve the plight of the hill people, especially working women, and was associated with temperance movements and earlier on with struggles against casteist discrimination.

Bahuguna died on 21 May 2021, due to COVID-19 complications. Shortly after, he was commemorated by Amul in one of its advertisements.

On 21 May 2022, Bahuguna's daughter, Madhu Pathak edited and published a souvenir book on his life and work. This book has contributions from reputed social activists, writers, intellectuals and politicians. In addition to Bahuguna's life and work, this book also helps the reader in understanding ecological mass-movements in Garhwal Himalayan region.

== Awards ==
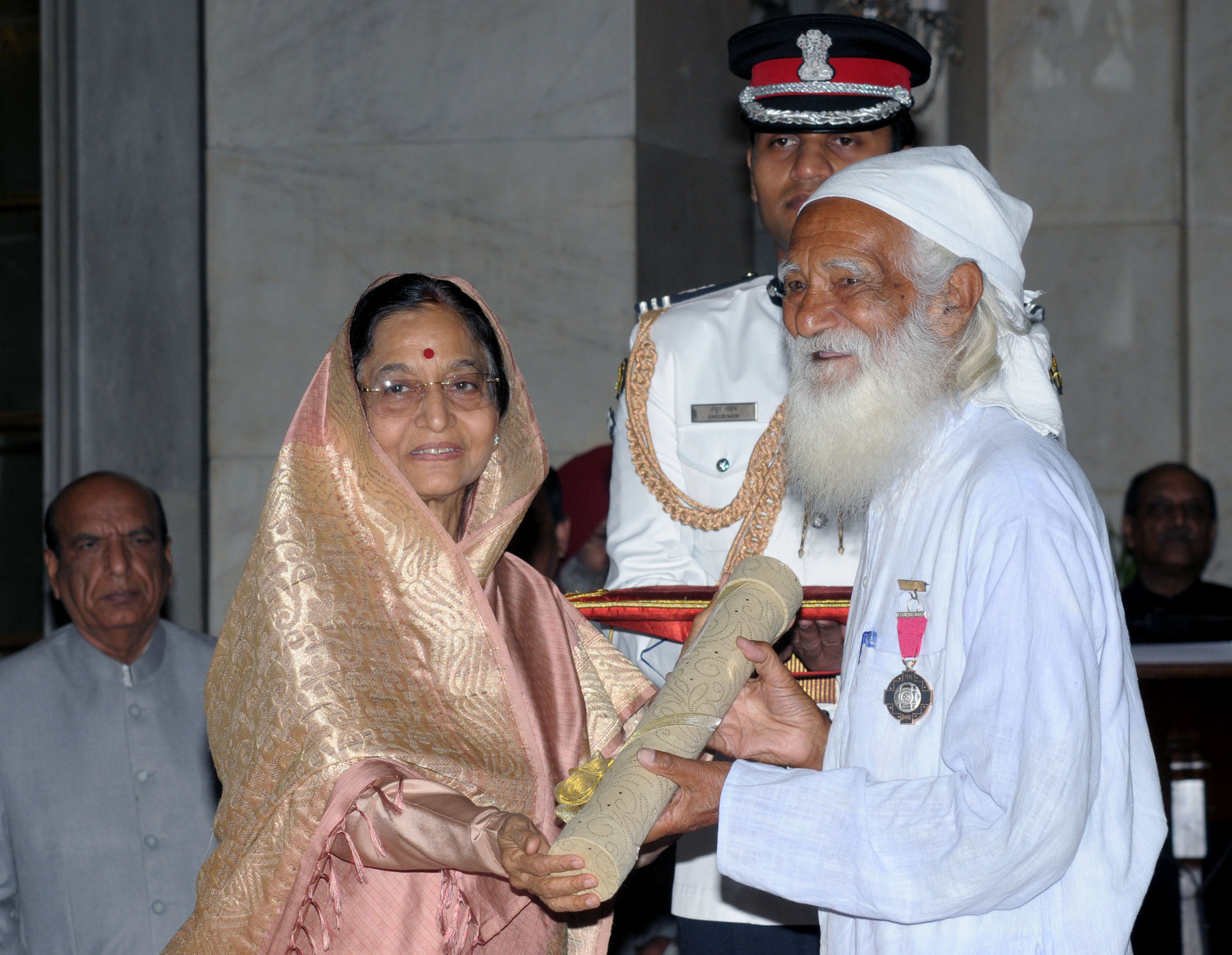
The President, Pratibha Devisingh Patil presenting Padma Vibhushan Award to Sunderlal Bahuguna at the Civil Investiture Ceremony, at Rashtrapati Bhavan, in New Delhi on 14 April 2009

- 1987: Right Livelihood Award (Chipko Movement)
- 1981: Padma Shri (Refused) In 1981 Bahuguna had refused to accept the Padma Shri over the government's refusal to cancel the Tehri dam project despite his protests.
- 1986: Jamnalal Bajaj Award for constructive work.
- 1989: Honorary Degree of Doctor of Social Sciences was conferred by IIT Roorkee.
- 2009: Padma Vibhushan Award by government of India for environment conservation.

== Books ==
- Sundar Lal Bahuguna Sankalp ke Himalaya सुन्दर लाल बहुगुणा संकल्प के हिमालय (Madhu Pathak May2013)
- India's Environment: Myth & Reality with Vandana Shiva, Medha Patkar
- Environmental Crisis and Humans at Risk: Priorities for action with Rajiv K.Sinha
- Bhu Prayog Men Buniyadi Parivartan Ki Or (Hindi)
- Dharti Ki Pukar (Hindi)
- James, George Alfred (2013). Ecology is Permanent Economy: The Activism and Environmentalism of Sunderlal Bahuguna. Albany: State University of New York.
