= Emblem of Uttarakhand =

Official state seal used by the Government of Uttarakhand

Emblem of Uttarakhand उत्तराखण्ड का राज्य-चिह्न
- Armiger: The Government of Uttarakhand
- Adopted: 9 November 2000
- Crest: The National Emblem of India superimposed on a red background
- Shield: A Diamond Shield of white background and blue borders with four streams charging from the left to right
- Supporters: Stylized mountain peaks of the Himalayas
- Motto: "सत्यमेव जयते" (Satyameva Jayate, Sanskrit for "Truth Alone Triumphs")
- Other elements: "उत्तराखण्ड राज्य" (Hindi for "State of Uttarakhand") inscribed in blue fonts at the bottom
- Use: Official representation of the State of Uttarakhand

The Emblem of Uttarakhand is the official state seal used by the Government of Uttarakhand and is carried on all official correspondences made by State of Uttarakhand. It was adopted by the newly formed Interim Government of Uttarakhand at the establishment of the state on 9 November 2000.

== Symbolism ==
The red background on the top represents the blood of statehood activists who lost their lives during the course of Uttarakhand statehood movement, while the white background represents the peaceful nature of the Uttarakhandi people. The mountains represent the geography and ecology of the Himalayan state and the four streams represent the Ganges.

The blue colour symbolizes purity of water attributed to the holy rivers of Uttarakhand.

== Government banner ==
The Government of Uttarakhand can be represented by a banner displaying the emblem of the state on a white field.

Banner of Uttarakhand

== See also ==
- Uttarakhand Devabhumi Matribhumi
- List of Uttarakhand state symbols
- National Emblem of India
- Lion Capital of Ashoka
- Lozenge
- List of Indian state emblems
