= Girish Tiwari =

Indian activist (1916-1944)

Girish Tiwari (Girda)
- Born: 10 September 1945; Jyoli, Almora, Kumaon Division, United Provinces of Agra and Oudh, British India
- Died: 22 August 2010 (aged 64); Tehri, Uttarakhand, India
- Other name: Girda
- Occupations: Social Activist; Scriptwriter; Director; Lyricist; Singer; Poet; Organic Culturist; Writer
- Spouse: Hemlata Tiwari
- Children: Tuhinananhu Tewari

Girish Tiwari "Girda" (10 September 1945 – 22 August 2010) was an Indian scriptwriter, director, lyricist, singer, poet, literary writer, and social activist from Uttarakhand, India. He is well-known for composing various poems and songs that were used in the Uttarakhand Statehood Movement.

== Early life ==
Born on 10 September 1945 in the village of Jyoli near Hawalbag in Almora District of Uttarakhand, he attended school at the Government Inter College in Almora and later schooling at Nainital. After meeting renowned lyricist and writer Late Brijendra Lal Sah, he realized his potential for creativity.

At the age of twenty-one, Girda met social activists at Lakheempur Khiri and got influenced by their work in the society. These meetings at such a tender age changed the life path of Girda and made him a creative writer and a social activist. He has been associated with the famed Chipko Movement and later with the Uttarakhand Andolan.

Girda left Almora for Lucknow in the 60s where he survived on odd jobs. Two prominent theories for his departure have emerged since then. The first is an account presented by writer Navin Joshi who theories Girda left Almora after suffering heartbreak from an unrequited love.

The more likely theory however points to more reformative motivations. In the 60s Girda tied a Hudka to his neck and would play the instrument in public. The Hudka was a symbol of caste divide and was played exclusively by specific Schedule Caste groups which were deemed untouchable. Tiwari was a Brahmin and him playing the hudka challenges caste hierarchy.

== Career ==
In 1967, Girda came in contact with Brijendra Lal Sah, a folk musician, poet, lyricist and theater personality, with whose recommendation Girda got a job in the Song and Drama Division of the Government of India, Nainital. As part of his work Girda's poems, songs, dramas and talks started getting broadcast on All India Radio. He was especially associated with the Uttarayan program of All India Radio, Lucknow.

In 1976 Girda joined "Yugmanch" a Nainital Theater group aimed at preserving and promoting the folk literature, art, and folk theatre of the hills. Girda has directed famous plays like "Andha Yug", "Andher Nagri", "Thank you Mr. Glad" and "Bharat Durdasha" with the Yug Manch. Girda has written plays including "Nagare Khamosh Hain" and "Dhanush Yagya" in response to the on-going Emergency declared by Prime Minister Indira Gandi. Girda edited "Shikharon ke Swar" in 1969, and later "Hamari Kavita ke Ankhar" and "Rang Dari Dio Albelin Main".

In Nainital on 27 November 1977 Girda headed a rally speaking out against the timber auctions that were being held. In this public demonstration, Girda composed and sang the poem 'Vrikshan ko Vilap' written by Gauri Dutt Pandey 'Gaurda' in 1926 with a new tone and sharp words. Girda was arrested and locked up in Haldwani, he was released in the evening where the proestors were told the auction had been stopped.

His latest compilation of poems and songs specially focusing "Uttarakhand Andolan" and "Uttarakhand Kavya" which was published in 2002. His songs "myar himala" has been an inspiration for the statehood movement, some other songs he made were "jainta ik din to aalo" which translated legendary poet Faiz Ahmed Faiz to kumaoni along with others.

He took voluntary retirement from the post of instructorship in the Song and Drama Division of the Ministry of Information and Broadcasting, and thereafter joined the Uttarakhand movement, and took to full-time creative writing. He was one of the founders and member of the editorial board of PAHAR, a Nainital-based organisation involved with promotion of Himalayan culture.

He died on 22 August 2010, after a brief illness and was survived by his wife Hemlata Tiwari and one son.
