= Bachendri Pal =

Indian mountaineer

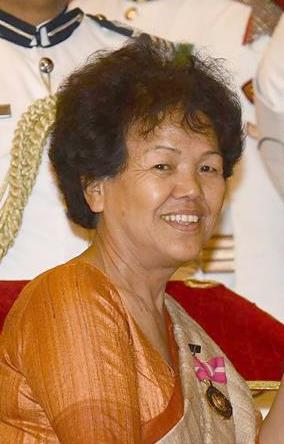
- Pal in March 2019

Personal information
- Nationality: Indian
- Born: 24 May 1954 (age 72) Nakuri, Uttarkashi, Uttarakhand, India
- Website: tsafindia.org

Climbing career
- Major ascents: First Indian woman to reach the summit of Mount Everest in 1984

Bachendri Pal (born 24 May 1954) is an Indian mountaineer. She is the first Indian woman to climb the summit of the world's highest mountain, Mount Everest. She is a recipient of the third highest civilian award in India, Padma Bhushan.

== Ascent ==
In 1984, India scheduled its fourth expedition to Mount Everest, christened "Everest '84". Bachendri Pal was selected as one of the members of the group of six Indian women and eleven men to attempt the ascent of Mount Everest (Sagarmatha in Nepalese). The team was flown to Kathmandu, the capital of Nepal, in March 1984, and from there the team moved onwards. Recalling her first glimpse of Mount Everest, Bachendri reminisced, "We, the hill people, have always worshipped the mountains... my overpowering emotion at this awe-inspiring spectacle was, therefore, devotional." The team commenced its ascent in May 1984. Her team almost met disaster when an avalanche buried their camp, and more than half the group abandoned the attempt because of injury or fatigue. Bachendri Pal and the remainder of the team pressed on to reach the summit. Bachendri Pal recalled, "I was sleeping in one of the tents with my teammates at Camp III at an altitude of 24,000 ft (7,315.2 m). On the night of 15–16 May 1984, at around 00:30 hours IST, I was jolted awake; something had hit me hard; I also heard a deafening sound and soon after I found myself being enveloped within a very cold mass of material."

On 22 May 1984, Ang Dorje (the Sherpa sirdar) and some other climbers joined the team to ascend to the summit of Mount Everest; Bachendri was the only woman in this group. They reached the South Col and spent the night there at Camp IV at the altitude of 26,000 ft (7,924.8 m). At 6:20 a.m. on 23 May 1984, they continued the ascent, climbing "vertical sheets of frozen ice"; cold winds were blowing at the speed of about 100 kilometres per hour (62 mph) and temperatures touching −30 to −40 °C (−22 to −40 °F). On 23 May 1984, the team reached the summit of Mount Everest at 1:07 p.m. and Bachendri Pal created history.

== After ==
Bachendri Pal continued to be active after ascending the highest peak in the world. She successfully led:

- An "Indo-Nepalese Women's Mount Everest Expedition – 1993" team composed only of women, which set benchmarks for Indian mountaineering when 18 people reached the summit including 7 women.
- All women team of rafters in "The Great Indian Women's Rafting Voyage – 1994", which had 18 women in 3 rafts. It was a pioneering effort by women in successfully completing the journey in the river Ganges from Haridwar to Calcutta, covering 2,155 km (1,339 mi) in 39 days.
- The "First Indian Women Trans-Himalayan Expedition – 1997", which was an effort by 8 women, who completed the trekking journey from the eastern part of the Himalayas in Arunachal Pradesh to the western part of the Himalayas at Siachen Glacier, reaching Indira Col, the northernmost tip of India at the altitude of 20,100 ft (6,126.5 m), covering more than 4,500 km (2,800 mi) in '225' days by crossing more than 40 high Mountain passes. This is the first success by any country.

== Social service ==
Bachendri Pal, along with Premlata Agarwal and a group of ice climbers including Mount Everest summiteers, arrived in Uttarkashi and carried out relief and rescue operations in the remotest high altitude villages of the Himalayas that had been ravaged in the 2013 North India floods.

== Awards and accolades ==
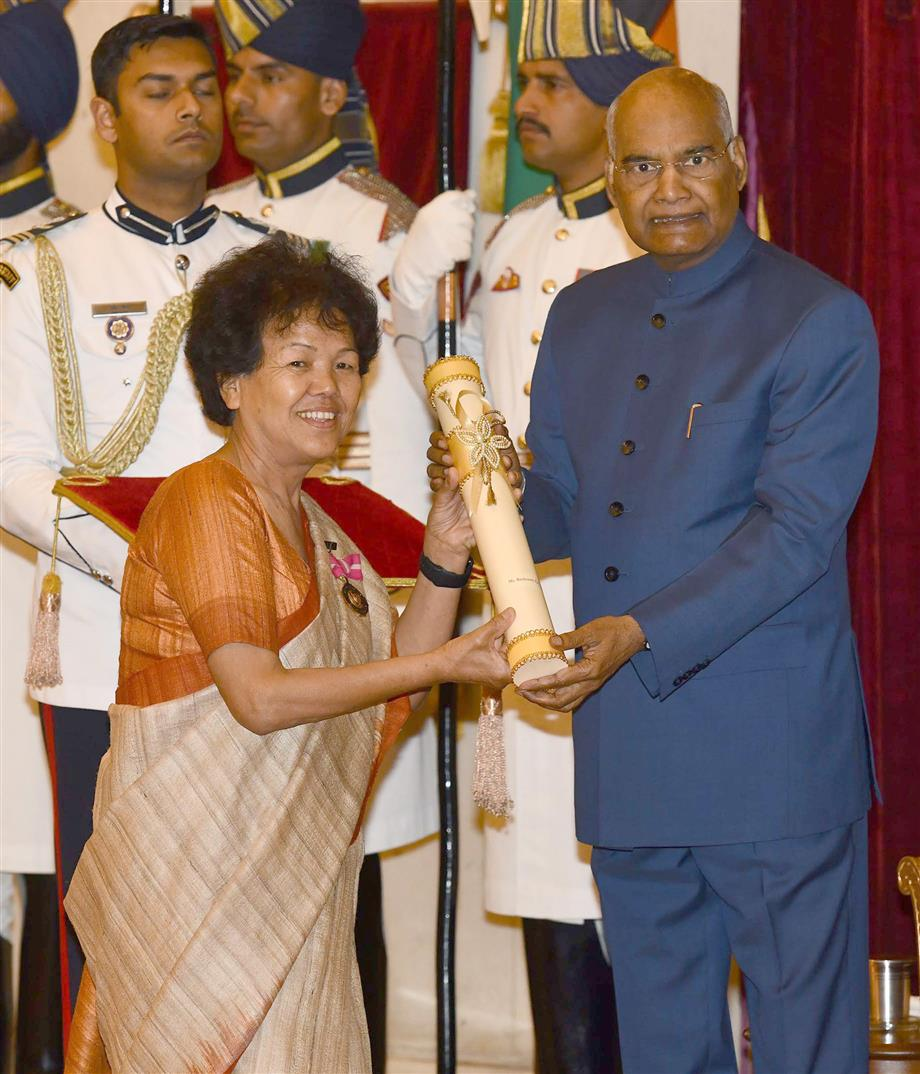
President Ram Nath Kovind presenting the Padma Bhushan Award to Bachendri Pal, at an Investiture Ceremony, at Rashtrapati Bhavan, in New Delhi on 16 March 2019

Bachendri Pal has been conferred with following awards and accolades:

- Gold Medal for Excellence in Mountaineering by the Indian Mountaineering Foundation (1984)
- Padma Shri, the fourth highest civilian award of the Republic of India (1984)
- Gold Medal by the Department of Education, Government of Uttar Pradesh, India (1985)
- Arjuna Award by the Government of India (1986)
- Calcutta Ladies Study Group Award (1986)
- Listed in the Guinness Book of World Records (1990)
- National Adventure Award by the Government of India (1994)
- Yash Bharati Award by the Government of Uttar Pradesh, India (1995)
- Honorary Doctorate from the Hemwati Nandan Bahuguna Garhwal University (formerly known as Garhwal University) (1997)
- First recipient of the Virangana Lakshmibai Rashtriya Samman by the Ministry of Culture, Government of Madhya Pradesh, India (2013)
- Bharat Gaurav Award by East Bengal Club (2014)
- Padma Bhushan, the third highest civilian award of the Republic of India (2019)
- Uttarakhand Gaurav Samman by the Government of Uttarakhand (2021)

== Books and publications ==
- Everest – My Journey to the Top, an autobiography published by National Book Trust, Delhi, ISBN 9788123715278

== See also ==
- List of Mount Everest records of India
- List of Mount Everest records
- List of Mount Everest summiters by number of times to the summit
- H. P. S. Ahluwalia
- Women in India –Status of women in India
- List of Indian women athletes
- List of 20th-century summiters of Mount Everest
