= Dev Raturi =

Dev Raturi (born 1976), also known as De Fu (Chinese: 德福), is an Indian citizen living in China. He has appeared in several Chinese film and television productions and is a restaurant business-owner. Raturi was awarded the Uttarakhand Gaurav Samman in 2025.

== Biography ==
Raturi was born in 1976 in Kemriya Saur village, in the Tehri Garhwal district of Uttarakhand, India. He sought to emulate Bruce Lee, whom he admired. To pursue his acting interest, he auditioned for a role in a TV serial in 1998, directed by Puneet Issar, but could not succeed.

In 2005, he got a job at an Indian restaurant in China. Raturi opened Red Fort, his first restaurant in Xi'an, China, in 2013. By 2015, he owned two restaurants and in the same year, entered the entertainment industry with a minor part as an Indian character in the Chinese television series SWAT. Raturi performed as minor characters in over 20 Chinese television dramas and films as of 2025, including My Roommate Is a Detective. He owns 11 Indian restaurants throughout China. Raturi received the Uttarakhand Gaurav Samman, one of the two highest civilian awards of the State of Uttarakhand, in 2025.
