= List of Uttarakhand state symbols =

This is a list of state symbols of the State of Uttarakhand in India.

== State Symbols ==
Title	Symbol	Image	Notes
State banner	Banner of Uttarakhand उत्तराखण्ड सरकार; Government of Uttarakhand		Uttarakhand does not have an officially recognised state flag; the Government of Uttarakhand can be represented by a banner displaying the state emblem on a plain field, following the general convention among Indian states that lack a distinct flag.
State emblem	Emblem of Uttarakhand उत्तराखण्ड का राजकीय चिन्ह; Emblem of Uttarakhand		The state emblem is a diamond-shaped shield with a white background and blue border, supported by stylised peaks of the Great Himalayas beneath which four streams, representing the state's principal rivers, flow from left to right. The Lion Capital of Ashoka, the national emblem of India, is superimposed on a small red field at the crest, with the national motto in Devanagari inscribed below it and the words "उत्तराखण्ड राज्य" ("State of Uttarakhand") at the base. It was adopted by the interim Government of Uttarakhand at the state's formation on 9 November 2000; the red field is popularly described as representing the sacrifice of the activists of the Uttarakhand movement, while the white ground and blue border are read as symbolising the peaceable character of the state's people and the purity of its glacial rivers respectively.
State motto	Satyameva Jayate सत्यमेव जयते Truth Alone Triumphs		Satyameva Jayate is the national motto of India, drawn from the Mundaka Upanishad. It is inscribed in Devanagari script on the Uttarakhand state emblem, in the same form used on the national emblem, rather than as a distinct state-adopted translation.
State song	Uttarakhand Devabhoomi Matribhoomi उत्तराखण्ड देवभूमि मातृभूमि Uttarakhand, Land of the Gods, O Motherland		A trilingual hymn praising Uttarakhand as a divine motherland, written by Hemant Bisht and composed by the Garhwali folk singer and musician Narendra Singh Negi. Of its seven verses, the first three are in Hindi and the remaining four in Garhwali and Kumaoni. It was adopted as the official state song in 2016.
State foundation day	Uttarakhand Day उत्तराखण्ड स्थापना दिवस; Uttarakhand Foundation Day		Also called Uttarakhand Divas, it commemorates the formation of the state on 9 November 2000, when it was carved out of the hill districts of northern Uttar Pradesh as the 27th state of India, initially under the name Uttaranchal.
State language	Hindi हिन्दी Hindi		Hindi is the official language of Uttarakhand and is spoken, along with its regional variants Garhwali, Kumaoni and Jaunsari, by the large majority of the state's population. Sanskrit was granted the status of second official language of the state in January 2010.
State animal	Kasturi Mrig अल्पाइन कस्तूरी मृग; Alpine musk deer Moschus chrysogaster		Kasturi Mrig is a shy, solitary musk deer of the Moschidae family, native to the coniferous and deciduous forests of the Himalayas at elevations of 3,000–5,000 m (9,800–16,400 ft). The male carries an externally visible musk sac between the testes; poaching for musk, used in perfumery and traditional medicine, has left the species classified as Endangered. It was adopted as the state animal in 2001.
State bird	Monal हिमालयी मोनाल; Himalayan monal Lophophorus impejanus		The Himalayan monal is a member of the pheasant family, Phasianidae, found in upper temperate oak-conifer forests and alpine meadows between 2,400–4,500 m (7,900–14,800 ft). The male displays iridescent blue, green, copper and purple plumage with a prominent metallic crest, while the female is cryptically coloured in browns and greys. It was adopted as the state bird in 2001, the same year the species was designated the national bird of Nepal, where it is known as danphe.
State butterfly	Common peacock कॉमन पीकॉक; Common peacock Papilio bianor polyctor		A large swallowtail with black wings dusted in metallic green and blue scales, found in forest tracts of the Indian Himalayan region between 500–2,200 m (1,600–7,200 ft). It was designated the state butterfly at a meeting of the Uttarakhand State Wildlife Board on 7 November 2016, making Uttarakhand the second Indian state, after Maharashtra (2015), to adopt an official state butterfly.
State flower	Brahmakamal ब्रह्म कमल; Brahmakamal; Saussurea obvallata		A rare, night-blooming flowering plant of the family Asteraceae, found among rocks and grasses at altitudes of 3,000–4,800 m (9,800–15,700 ft) and flowering in the mid-monsoon months of July and August. It is offered at the Kedarnath and Badrinath shrines and, in Hindu tradition, is named for the god Brahma. It was adopted as the state flower in 2001.
State fruit	Kaphal काफल; Kaphal; Myrica esculenta		A tart, mulberry-like wild berry of the bayberry family that fruits across the mid-Himalayan forests of Uttarakhand in early summer and is commemorated in the Kumaoni folk song Kafal Pako. Kaphal is widely described in state tourism and cultural literature as Uttarakhand's state fruit, although, unlike the state's other biological symbols, no government order formalising the designation has been traced.
State tree	Burans बुरांश; Burans; Rhododendron arboreum		An evergreen tree of the Himalayan foothills growing to 10–15 m (33–49 ft), bearing red, pink or white bell-shaped flowers in early spring. The flowers are pressed into burans ka sharbat, a squash popular across the hill regions, and a geographical-indication tag was granted to Uttarakhand Buransh Sharbat in December 2023. It was adopted as the state tree in 2001.
State fish	Mahseer महाशीर; Golden mahseer Tor putitora		An endangered cyprinid of the Indus, Ganges and Brahmaputra river basins, popular as a gamefish and once believed the largest species of mahseer, reaching up to 2.75 m in length. Its numbers have declined by more than half owing to habitat loss and overfishing. It was adopted as the state fish in 2001.
State instrument	Dhol ढोल; Dhol		A double-headed, cylindrical membranophone played with a pair of wooden or cane sticks, central to Uttarakhandi folk music and to religious and cultural ceremonies including jagar rituals; it was historically also used to relay messages between remote hill villages. It was declared the state instrument in February 2015.
State sport	Football फुटबॉल; Football		Football is administered in the state by the Uttarakhand State Football Association, which fields men's and women's teams in the Santosh Trophy and the Senior Women's National Football Championship respectively, alongside a state-level professional league. It was declared the state sport in April 2011.

== See also ==
- List of Indian state symbols
- Emblems of Indian States
