= Anil Prakash Joshi =

Indian environmentalist

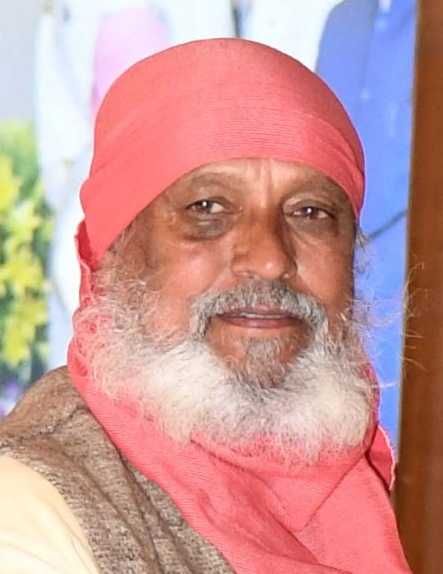
- Joshi in 2020
- Born: 6 April 1955 (age 71); Kotdwar, Pauri Garhwal district, Uttarakhand, India
- Occupations: Social worker Botanist; Green activist
- Known for: Himalayan Environmental Studies and Conservation Organization
- Spouse: Dr. Sandhya Joshi
- Children: Shivam Joshi
- Parent(s): Fateh Ram Joshi, Satyabhama Joshi
- Awards: Padma Bhushan; Padma Shri; Jamnalal Bajaj Award; Ashoka Fellowship; The Week Man of the Year; ISC Jawaharlal Nehru Award

Anil Prakash Joshi is an environmentalist, green activist, and the founder of Himalayan Environmental Studies and Conservation Organization (HESCO), a Dehradun-based voluntary organization. His work includes development of sustainable technologies that are ecology inclusive economy for ecosystem development. He has coined GEP (gross environmental product), an ecological growth measure parallel to GDP. GEP has been accepted as a growth measure by the state of Uttarakhand on 5 June 2021. He was selected as the man of the year by Week Magazine in 2003. He is a recipient of the Jamnalal Bajaj Award and is an Ashoka Fellow. The Government of India awarded him the fourth highest civilian honour of the Padma Shri, in 2006, for his contributions to Indian society. He was also awarded Padma Bhushan, third highest civilian award in 2020 for environmental conservation in Uttarakhand. Dr. Joshi appeared in the Kaun Banega Crorepati, Karamveer episode aired on 25 December 2020.

== Biography ==
Dr. Anil Prakash Joshi was born on 6 April 1955 at Kotdwar, in Pauri Garhwal district, in the present day Uttarakhand state of India in a family of farmers and secured a master's degree in botany and a doctoral degree in ecology. He started his career as a member of faculty at the Kotdwar Government PG College but resigned the job in 1979 and founded Himalayan Environmental Studies and Conservation Organization (HESCO), a non-governmental organization. Under the aegis of HESCO, Joshi promoted research and development of new environment-friendly technologies for the agricultural sector, tapping the local resources. He is supported by a team of 30 people, and the group is known to have been involved in the dissemination of knowledge on eco-friendly techniques and technologies in 40 villages in the state. His concept of gross environmental product has since been adopted by the State Government.

Dr. Joshi has launched several social programmes, based on resource-based rural development, such as Women Technology Park, Technology Intervention for Mountain-Eco System, Ecological Food Mission in Mountain and Women's Initiative for Self Employment (WISE) and has been reported to be successful in providing the villages with water mills, composting pits, toilets, plan-based drugs and herbal pesticides and rainwater harvesting techniques. Finding uses for a local shrub, Kurri, which had been considered a weed, by utilising it for making furniture, incense sticks and using the left-overs as fodder was one initiative developed by Joshi. He is credited with over 60 articles and ten books on the subject.

Ashoka, the social entrepreneurial network, elected him as their Fellow in 1993. The Indian Science Congress awarded him the Jawaharlal Nehru Award in 1999 and The Week magazine selected him as the Man of the Year in 2002. The Government of India included him in the 2006 Republic Day Honours list for the civilian award of the Padma Shri and the same year, he received the Jamnalal Bajaj Award for his efforts in the application of science and technology for rural development.

== Filmography ==
A Son Of Himalaya is a documentary on the life story of Anil Prakash Joshi.

== Awards ==
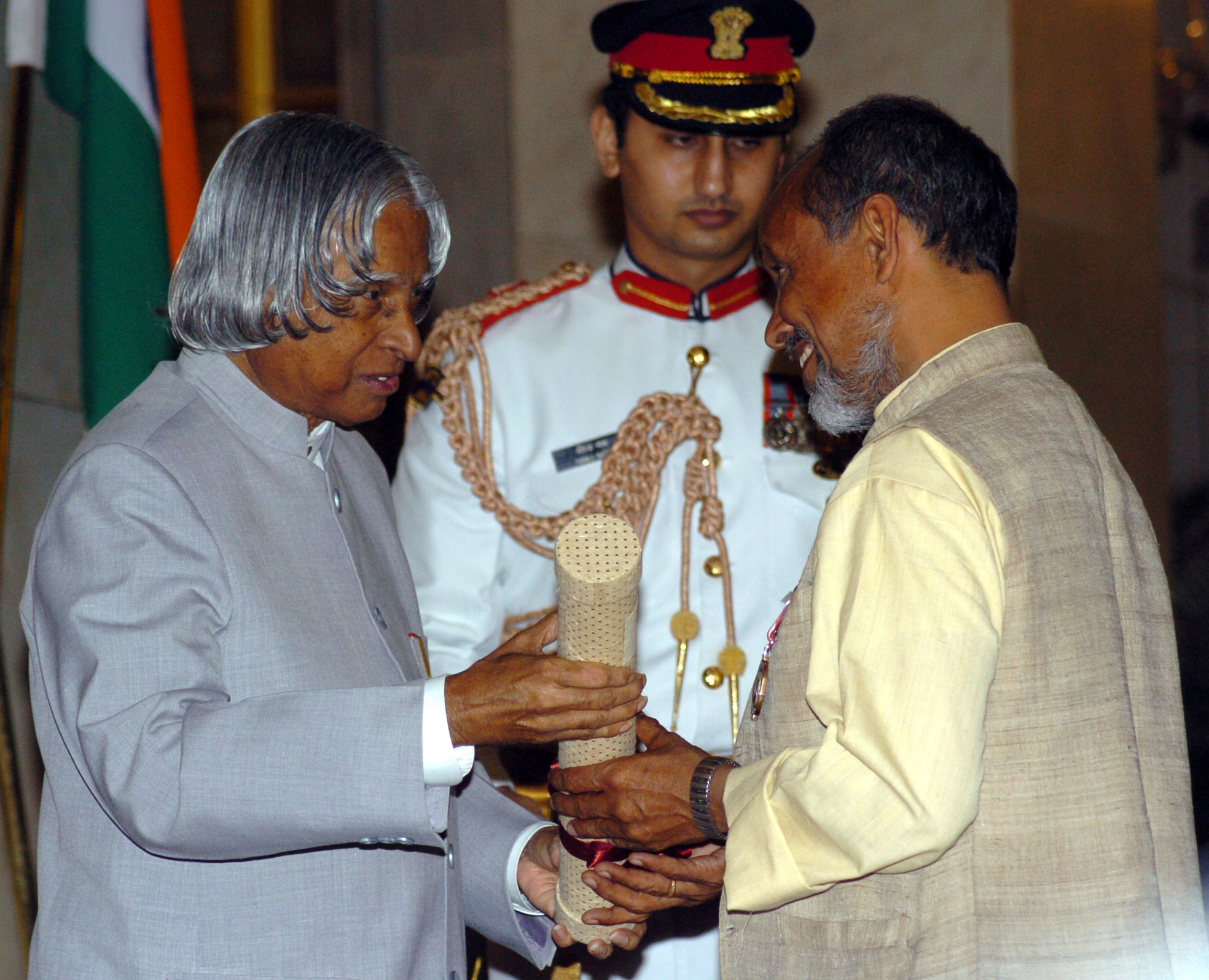

The President, Dr. A.P.J. Abdul Kalam presenting Padma Shri in 2006.

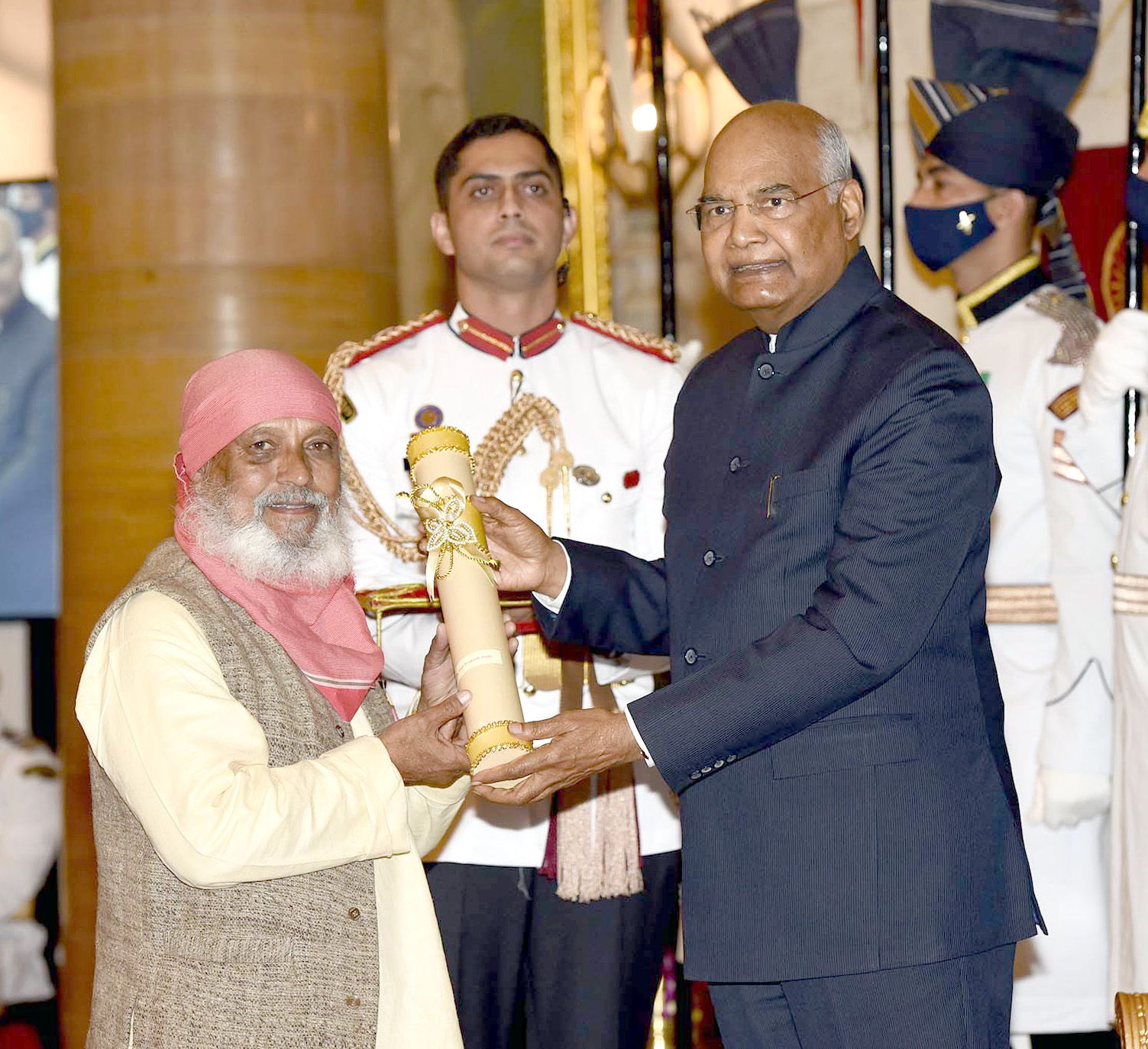

The President, Ram Nath Kovind presenting Padma Bhushan in 2021.

== See also ==
- Bill Drayton
