= Tilu Rauteli =

Indian folk heroine

- Born: c. 1661; Garhwal, present-day Uttarakhand, India
- Died: c. 1681 (age ~20); Khairagarh, Garhwal region, India
- Other name: Teelu Devi Rauteli
- Occupation: Folk warrior
- Known for: Leading battles in 17th-century Garhwal
- Partner: Bhawani Singh Negi (as per oral tradition)
- Parent: Bhoop Singh

Tilu Rauteli (born Tilottama Devi) was a Garhwali warrior and folk heroine who was born in village Gurrad Talla, Chaundkot, Pauri Garhwal district of Uttarakhand, India during the seventeenth century. She is credited with fighting seven wars between the ages of fifteen and twenty.

== Early life ==
Rauteli was born in the latter half of the 17th century according to some legends . She is probably the only female warrior in the world who fought seven wars, starting at age fifteen. She was one of the three children of Bhoop Singh (Gorla) Rawat. The others were her brothers Bhagtu and Pathwa. At age fifteen, her engagement was betrothed with Bhuppa Singh Negi from Ida Talla village (Near Srikotkhal) in Pauri Garhwal district. In those days, Katyuri warriors of Kumaon were continuously attacking the Garhwal Kingdom.

== Life as a warrior ==
After a few days the annual Kauthig (country fair) was organised in Kanda, Rauteli wished to attend. She was unyielding in her demand. Her mother, devastated by the loss of her husband and sons, stated...

"O Tilu! What are you! Don't you miss your brothers? Who will avenge your father's death? If you want to go somewhere, it should be battlefield.... Can you go? Can you avenge........? Enjoy your Kauthig after that!"

This taunt from her mother left an indelible mark on Rauteli's mind, and she pushed aside her wish to go to Kauthig. Instead she began to prepare a battalion with her friends, and she regrouped the army. After some time, she departed for the battlefield, riding her horse "Binduli", and accompanied by her friends "Bellu" and "Devali". Kanda Malla village is her Nanihaal.

== Battle of Khairagarh, Umtagarhi, Sald Mahadev and Kalinkakhal ==
According to local folktales the Khairagarh (present day Kalagarh) was her first exploit, where she overwhelmed the Katyuris of Kumaon. Then she attacked, Umtagarhi, and after that she marched her army to Sald Mahadev, freeing it from the enemy.

After settling the border line up to Chaukhutia, Rauteli returned to Deghat with her army. In Kalinkakhal, she fought the enemy and avenged her father's death by defeating the general of Katyuri army in Saraikhet, where her father had lost his life. Her comrade "Binduli" died after receiving lethal wounds there.

== Supreme sacrifice ==
After winning her territories back, she started marching towards Kanda. While crossing the Nayar River, she stopped to refresh herself, where she gave ultimate sacrifice of her.

== Legacy ==
'Ranbhoot' is invoked in her memory in 'Jagars'. 'Thadya' dance songs are performed in her honour across Uttarakhand.
