= Saraikhet =

Village in Uttarakhand, India

- Village
- Location in Uttarakhand, India
- Coordinates: 29°53′13″N 79°7′44″E
- Country: India
- State: Uttarakhand
- District: Almora
- Time zone: UTC+5:30 (IST)
- PIN: 246275
- Vehicle registration: UK
- Website: almora.nic.in

Saraikhet (spelling variants: Suraikhet and Sarai Khet) is a village in Almora district, Uttarakhand, India. It has a population of 305 (as of 2011). It is situated on the Moradabad highway, located approximately 99.4 kilometers from Ramnagar and 95.2 kilometers from Pauri, in Pauri Garhwal district. Saraikhet is close to the border between the regions of Garhwal and Kumaon.
