= Brightlands School =

- 1, Dick Road, Dalanwala; Dehradun, Uttarakhand, 248 001; India

Information
- Type: Private
- Motto: Vidyaev Balam (Knowledge is Strength)
- Established: 1958
- School district: Dehradun District
- Principal: Ms. Pushpa Thapliyal
- Head of school: Ms. Madhu Narang
- Houses: Nilgiri (Blue), Vindhyachal (Yellow), Shivalik (Green) and Aravali (Red)
- Affiliation: ICSE and ISC

Brightlands School (or Brightlands) is a private school located in the Curzon Road suburb of Dehradun, Uttarakhand, India. Brightlands was established in 1958 as a primary school and bought by the Narang family in 1971. After Mrs. Narang died in 1977, her son Ravi Narang took over the school and ran it until he died in 2020. Following Ravi Narang’s demise, Brightlands is being run by his sister Madhu Narang.

The school was started in Dalanwala where Windlass Apartments now stands, till it moved to Kasturba road, also known as Curzon road. It is a 10+2 senior-secondary level, English medium, co-educational school affiliated to the Council for the Indian School Certificate Examinations, New Delhi. Over the years, Brightlands has established itself as a school with a reputation for exceptional academic results. In 2023, on the ICSE board exams for class 10, 5 of the top 10 students in Uttarkhand were from Brightlands. On those same board exams, 100 out of 156 students scored above 90% and 56 students scored above 95%. However, the school is also notorious for not having any extracurricular activities like sports leading to the frustration of many students.
