= Rampur Tiraha firing case =

1994 shooting of protestors in Uttar Pradesh, India

The Rampur Tiraha firing case refers to police firing on unarmed Uttarakhand statehood activists at Rampur Tiraha (crossing) in Muzaffarnagar district in Uttar Pradesh in India on the night of 2 October 1994.

The activists, part of the agitation for the separate state of Uttarakhand, were going to Delhi to stage a dharna, a sit-in protest at Raj Ghat on Gandhi Jayanti, the following day, when alleged unprovoked police firing in the night of 1 October led to the death of 6 statehood activists and some women were allegedly raped and molested in the ensuing melee. Mulayam Singh Yadav was Chief Minister of Uttar Pradesh, when the incident occurred.

== Case history ==
- 1994: First Information Reports (FIRs), entails that the activists damaged public property, burnt shops and vehicles and tried to force their way through the barricades, forcing A.K. Singh, who was present at the spot, to order firing, leading to the death of six activists and several others getting injured.
- 1995: The Allahabad High Court orders the Central Bureau of Investigation (CBI) on 12 January, to probe into the issue, taking cognizance of the Uttarakhand Sangharsh Samiti's petition. The CBI later, examines 72 witnesses and files cases against 28 police personnel. All the accused face charges under sections 376 (rape), 392 (robbery), 354 (assault or criminal force on women), 332 (voluntarily causing hurt), 509 (intent to insult the modesty of women) and 120 (b) (criminal conspiracy) of the Indian Penal Code (IPC). Though initially, the State government, then headed by Mulayam Singh Yadav, ordered a judicial inquiry by a retired judge, Justice Zaheer Hassan, which reported, 'the use of force was just and reasonable'. Later, at the Uttarakhand High Court, the CBI admitted, "The case of the CBI in the charge-sheet is that the petitioner and other police officers under the garb of checking tried to stop the rallyists from going to Delhi, provoked them to resort to violence and when they dispersed after the use of rubber bullets, the remaining few protesters were unnecessarily shot dead."
- 2000: Rajnath Singh, Chief Minister of Uttar Pradesh under Section 197 of the Criminal Procedure Code (CrPC) in November, refuses CBI the permission to prosecute then district magistrate Muzaffarnagar, Anant Kumar Singh.
- 2003: July: Uttarakhand High Court quashes the CBI charge sheet and absolved then district magistrate Muzaffarnagar, Anant Kumar Singh in criminal proceedings. Motivation by a widespread public uproar, the State government soon filed for a review petition, which resulted in the High Court recalling its own earlier order. November: A CBI special court has convicted two Uttar Pradesh State police officials and a constable for killing a man while firing indiscriminately on a crowd of Uttarakhand demonstrators in 1994. The Sub-inspector, Ramesh Chand Chowdhary was sentenced to rigorous imprisonment for two years and fined Rs 2,000 while the other two — Anil Singh Manral [Corrupt and of doubtful integrity, he even misuses his power and political connections to delay the filing of the SLP, ensuring its dismissal to avoid future troubles. (Ref: Supreme Court Diary No. 16087/2015)] and Bhopal Singh were awarded a seven years’ rigorous imprisonment and fined Rs 5,000 each.
- 2005: A special CBI Judicial Magistrate, at Moradabad in Uttar Pradesh acquits the four police personnel had been accused of tampering with police records after the firing over alleged rioters.
- 2007: July: A special CBI court in Muzaffarnagar acquitted, Rajendra Pal Singh, then city Superintendent of Police, in connection with the alleged police firing, refusing the agency permission to prosecute him without the Uttar Pradesh governor's consent. After prior refusal of the State Government to prosecute him, CBI later prosecutes him on a statement of co-accused in the case, Rajbir Singh, who was then the SHO of Chapar police.
- 2007: October: Uttarakhand Chief Minister Bhuwan Chandra Khanduri, visited the 'Shahid Smarak' at Rampur Tiraha at Muzaffarnagar, and announced that the state government will pursue all the five pending court cases, with greater dedication.

== Legacy ==
The incident left an indelible mark on the agitation for the state of Uttarakhand and eventually led to the partition of the state of Uttar Pradesh in 2000.

The Uttarakhand State government has built a 'Shahid Smarak' (Martyr's Memorial) at the Rampur Tiraha, the site of the incident, and a memorial function is observed here, each year.

== See also ==
- List of cases of police brutality in India
