= Sri Dev Suman =

Indian activist (1916-1944)

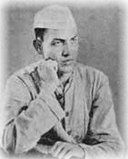
- Born: 25 May 1916; Jaul, Tehri Garhwal, Kingdom of Garhwal
- Died: 25 July 1944 (aged 28); Tehri, Kingdom of Garhwal
- Occupations: Anti-Monarchy Activist; Gandhian; Freedom Fighter; Teacher
- Spouse: Vinay Laxmi

Sri Dev Suman, born Sri Dutt Badoni (25 May 1916 – 25 July 1944) was an Indian anti-monarchy social activist, freedom fighter and writer from the princely state of Tehri Garhwal in British India (now District Tehri of Uttarakhand, India). Dev Suman is most renowned for his part in inspiring and leading non-violent Gandhian civil rights movements and eventual campaigns demanding the total abolition of the monarchy of Tehri.

== Early life ==
Suman was born to an Ayurvedic practitioner, Dr Hari Ram Badoni, and a homemaker Tara Devi. Suman was born at Jaul village, patti Bamund near the chamba city of Tehri Garhwal. Anti-monarchy sentiment is noted to have been gaining fervour in Tehri Garhwal at the time of Suman's birth. With the mention of several local agitation called "ढंडक" taking place in the kingdom around the time of his birth.

Suman lost his father at three years old, to a cholera outbreak, leaving the familial responsibilities at the hands of Tara Devi. Suman completed his primary education at Jaul and Chambakhal. Suman Studied literature at Punjab University. He also worked with newspapers like Dharmraj and the Hindu.

In 1938, Suman attended a political event organised in Srinagar by the district Congress Committee. Here, he had the opportunity to meet Jawaharlal Nehru and Vijaylaxmi Pandit. Suman is said to have narrated the dismal state of Tehri and Uttarakhand to Nehru. After meeting several political and social activists in the conference he decided to amplify his efforts for the people of Garhwal.

Suman wed Vinay Laxmi in 1938, and the latter would go on to represent the Devprayag Constituency as a Member of the Legistlave Assembly for two consequtive terms in 1957 and 1962.

== Independence movement ==
During the Indian independence movement, Suman advocated that Tehri Riyasat be freed from the rule of the King of Garhwal. He was a staunch admirer of Gandhi and resolved to practice Gandhian methods of non-violent protests to struggle for the freedom of his beloved Tehri.

Suman took up means of Gandhian Satyagrah and from the King of Tehri, widely referred to as "Bolanda Badri", (speaking Badrinath), he demanded the complete independence for Tehri. Suman organized multiple civil disobedience movements and served as the writer of many underground publications under the pseudonym 'Suman Saurabh'.

Suman admired Gandhi and propagated his ideology of non-violent struggle, and swadeshi in Tehri. Sundarlal Bahuguna, renowned for popularizing the chipko movement was also a devoted disciple of his, also credits Suman for introducing the Tehri population to Gandhi, the Charkha and Nationalism.

Suman was also an active part of the pan India freedom movement against the British Raj. In 1930, a fourteen-year-old Dev Suman took part in the "salt satyagraha" in Dehradun, for which he was arrested and sentenced to a 15-day imprisonment

Following his release Suman set out to meet his hero, Gandhi. Suman met Gandhi at the Ashram of Wardha to whom he was formally introduced by Veer Chandra Singh Garhwali. Suman shared with Garhwali his thoughts on the meeting "My wish was fulfilled today by Bapuji, because Bapuji accepted my proposal regarding Garhwal and blessed me to serve the people of Tehri state through truth and non-violence. For me it is a matter of life and death, because the people of Tehri are extremely unhappy."

After his conversation Suman asked Garhwali what his dream for the people of Garhwal was. On this, Chandra Singh Garhwali narrated his dream to Shridev Suman and said, 'I imagine an independent Garhwal in independent India. Like India will be a federation of many independent unions. An independent Garhwal under the same federation.". Garhwali shared his dream of an independent Garhwal no longer politically and socially divided by the Ganges. He also emphasized a future with a classless and post-untouchability society with no capitalists and no landlords.

On 23 January 1939, Sri Dev Suman founded the "Tehri Rajya Paraja Mandal", and solidified his position as the most popular youth leader of the Uttarakhandi populace at just 22 years of age. In the same sequence, he established Himalayan National Education Council in Banaras and published a book named Himachal and got it distributed throughout the princely state.

However, Suman's involvement in the pan-India Freedom Struggle against the British Rule soon landed him in prison once more. At which time he was constantly transferred between the Central Agra Jail and Dehradun.

== Imprisonment in Tehri ==
Suman was released from Agra jail in 1943, following which he promptly resumed his activism for the people of Tehri and became more vocal in demanding the rights of citizens.

On 27 December 1943, when Sri Dev Suman was trying to re-enter Tehri he was stopped at Chamba, arrested and locked up in Tehri jail on 30 December 1943. On 31 January 1944, he was sentenced to two years' imprisonment and a fine of Rs 200 was levied upon him. In response to his sentence Suman made three demands:

1. The Tehri Prajamandal should be registered and given the opportunity to serve the state.
2. The king himself should hear the appeal of Sri Dev Suman's false case.
3. Suman be provided facilities for correspondence with his family and associates.

Suman gave the state an ultimatum of 15 days, which if unfulfilled he would begin a fast unto death. During this time Suman was subjected to inhumane torture. He was heavily shackled and was given his food, which jailer Mohan Singh and others, had mixed with sand and stones.

On 3 May 1944, Suman launched his historic indefinite fast to protest the inhuman behavior of the jail authorities and the dismissal of his demands under the rule of the Tehri monarchs.

When news of Suman's fast broke out, the King of Tehri spread a rumor that Suman had broken the fast and was to be released on the Maharaja's birthday as a gesture of great generousity. In reality, the monarchy had made a proposal to Suman, which guaranteed his acquittal in exchange of him withdrawing his demands for the independence of Tehri and the end of his fast, which the latter declined.

His condition started deteriorating and by 11 July 1944 it became critical. Even then he resisted attempts at force feeding by the Jail authorities.

== Death ==
Two hundred and nine days into his prison sentence for the last eighty four of which he had spent on a hunger strike, and five more he spent comatose, Sri Dev Suman perished on 25 July 1944. Just two months after his 28th birthday.

Local legends recount that the King of Tehri had Suman's corpse hung on a tree in Srinagar in a display of feudal power to deter other protestors. The legend however, is believed to have been concocted at a later date to gain support for the rebels, against the monarchy and in the future was recalled to garner solidarity for the Uttarakhand Statehood Movement.

Reports of the time however indicate that there was a cover up upon Suman's death. The kingdom, anticipating outrage had Suman's corpse stuffed inside a sack and secretly thrown into the Bhilangna River from the Kandal bridge without any funerary rituals.

== Legacy ==
1. Sri Dev Suman remains a popular political figure in the hills of(very very important for Uttarakhand exam also)Uttarakhand, most beloved in his native village. His name was also heavily evoked during the post-independence political protests for the statehood of uttarakhand.
2. In 2012, the Government of Uttarakhand through Pt. Deen Dayal Upadhyay Uttarakhand Vishwavidhyalaya Act, 2011[3] and its amendment . Deen Dayal Upadhyay Uttarakhand Vishwavidhyalaya (Amendment) Ordinance, 2012, changed the name of Pt. Deen Dayal Upadhyay Uttarakhand Vishwavidhyalaya to Sri Dev Suman Uttarakhand University (SDSUV).SDSUV is a State university situated at Badshahithaul in Tehri Garhwal district of north Indian state of Uttarakhand, India.
3. On 27 October 2023, a full length Garhwali biopic titled 'Pahadi Ratan Sridev Suman' was released in selected theatres.
