= Basanti Bisht =

First woman 'jagar' singer of Uttarakhand

Vidushi Dr.Basanti Bisht
- Born: 1953 (age 72–73)
- Years active: 1998– present
- Known for: Uttarakhandi folk singer & Folk Dance Choreographer; She is the only "TOP GRADE" Folk Singer of Akashwani and Doordarshan from Uttarakhand; First professional woman singer of the Jaagar folk form of Uttarakhand.
- Awards: Padma Shri (2017); Rashtriya Matoshri Devi Ahilya Samman (2016); Teelu Rauteli Nari Shakti Samman

Dr. Basanti Bisht (born , 1953) is a well known folk singer of Uttarakhand, famous for being the first woman singer of the Jagar folk-form of Uttarakhand. The Jagar form of singing is a way of invoking deities, which is traditionally done by men but, Basanti Bisht broke the practice and today is a well-known voice, and is trying to preserve this traditional form of singing. Basanti Bisht was awarded the Padma Shri in 2017.

== Early life ==
Lok Jaagar Gayika Vidushi Dr.Basanti Bisht was born in Luwani village/dewal block of Chamoli district bordering Kumaon Uttarakhand in 1953. She married an artillery soldier at the age of 15 and remained a housewife for the large part of her life. Though her professional singing began much later, when she learned music in Jalandhar, Punjab. But she has been singing since her childhood. She says that grew up listening to her mother's jagar songs.

“I always sang along with my mother, who sang as she went about her chores. The many fairs and festivals in the village only made my love for this form of music grow deep.”

— Basanti Bisht, Basanti Bisht gets candid on her musical journey, The Hindu Newspaper

She was the 1st batch of 03 girls who studied till class 5th in her village school which was a mile away from her village. She was the 1st girl-student who stood 1st in the District Board Examination of 5th standard and was awarded scholarship @20/-month for further studies for 03 years. But could not continue further as village had no school beyond 5th and the middle school was very far 15 km from her home and could not be reached by foot all alone through jungle.

== Musical career ==
Her professional career began in her 40s as she was busy with her family till then. After she moved to Jalandhar with her husband, Basanti Bisht was keen to learn music at the Pracheen Kala Kendra in Jalandhar, but felt shy as she was an adult, and the other students were young children. She took her first tentative step towards professional musical training, when her daughter's teacher started teaching her how to play the harmonium. She started singing in public after that with a focus on bhajans, film songs, etc. After her husband retired, Basanti Bisht settled in Dehradun, and was empanelled in 1996 as an : "B" GRADE Artist at All India Radio stationNajibabad. In 2013 she was awarded "A" Grade Folk Singer Category. Currently she has earned and is the only "TOP GRADE" Grade Folk Singer of Aakashwani from Uttarakhand.

She had the blessings of people to be elected as the 1st Lady Pradhan in 1996 of her village.

Over a period of time, she realised that the music that she had inherited, and absorbed subliminally from her mother and other village elders in her childhood was unique; “jaagar” singing, or all night singing by the village folk in praise of the Gods. The ancient folk traditions of the hills of Uttarakhand were no longer being sung and Basanti Bisht took it on herself to search for old lost songs and later render them in the same old tunes.

Basanti Bisht's singing is known for its slightly nasal voice production, the sing song style, and the slow pace of rhythm all of which are typical of the Garhwali singing style of Uttarakhand.

== Personal life ==
Her husband retired as a Naik from the Indian Army. Her son is a Wing Commander in the Indian Air Force and her daughter retired as Captain is married to a Colonel in the Indian Army.

== Awards ==
- Rashtriya Matoshri Ahilya Devi Samman by the Government of Madhya Pradesh (2017)
- Padma Shri (2017)
- Teelu Rauteli Nari Shakti Samman by the Government of Uttarakhand
- "First Ladies" by Ministry of Women & Child Development Govt. of India 2018
