= Gaura Devi =

Indian activist (1925–1991)

- Gaura Devi
- Born: 1925; Lata, Chamoli, Uttarakhand, India
- Died: 4 July 1991 (Aged 66)
- Known for: Chipko movement

Gaura Devi (1925 – 1991) was a grassroots activist and a rural women community leader from India who played an important role in the Chipko movement. She was conferered the Uttarakhand Gaurav Samman in 2025 posthumously.

== Life ==
Gaura Devi was born in 1925 in a village named Lata in the state of Uttarakhand. She moved to a nearby village named Raini by the Alaknanda River. By the age of 22 she was a widow with a child. Her new village was near to the border with Tibet. Gaura Devi was elected to lead the Mahila Mangal Dal (Women's Welfare Association) in the wake of the Chipko movement. The organisation worked on the protection of community forests.

== Birth of Chipko ==
Gaura Devi came to the forefront of the Chipko movement in 1974. On 25 March 1974, she was told by a young girl that local loggers were cutting trees near their village. The men of Reni village had been tricked out of the village by news that the government was going to pay out compensation for land used by the army. Gaura Devi and 27 other women decided to tackle the loggers. She confronted and challenged the men to shoot her instead of cutting down the trees and she described the forest as "Vandevta" (God of Jungle) and her maika (mother's house). Finally, with the help of other women she managed to halt the work of loggers by hugging the trees despite the abuse and threats of the armed loggers. The women of village and Gaura Devi kept guard of the trees that night and over the next three or four days other villages and villagers joined the action. The loggers left leaving the trees. After this incident, the Uttar Pradesh Government established a committee of experts to investigate the issue of felling of trees, and the lumber company withdrew its men from Reni. The committee stated that the Reni forest was an ecologically sensitive area and that no trees should be felled there. Thereafter the government of Uttar Pradesh placed a 10-year ban on all tree-felling in an area of over 1150 km^{2}.

Gaura Devi died in July 1991, at the age of 66.
