= Uttarakhand movement =

Regionalist political movement in India

The Uttarakhand movement refers to the events of statehood activism within the undivided state of Uttar Pradesh which ultimately resulted in the formation of Uttarakhand, India as a separate state in the year 2000. The new state corresponds to the culturally distinct hill regions which included the former kingdoms of Garhwal and Kumaon. The movement began gaining traction in the 1970s and by 1994, the demand for a separate state eventually took the form of a mass movement that resulted in the formation of India's 27th state.

The Uttar Pradesh Reorganisation Act, 2000 was enacted by the Parliament of India to carve out the new state of Uttarakhand (initially named Uttaranchal) from the state of Uttar Pradesh. Then President Kocheril Raman Narayanan signed the bill on 1 August 2000 and on 9 November 2000 Uttarakhand became the 27th state of the Republic of India.

Dehradun was announced the temporary capital of Uttarakhand at the state's formation in 2000. The Dixit Commission (formed 2000) recommended in 2008 Dehradun as permanent capital, citing reasons such as infrastructure, connectivity, and geological suitability. Political challenges and regional interests have opposed the suggestion. Bhairsen was announced the state's summer capital in 2020.

Jeet Bahadur Gurung became the first martyr in Pauri on 8 August 1994.

== History ==
The territory of present-day Uttarakhand historically broadly comprised the distinct Himalayan polities of Kumaon and Garhwal, which had up to the entry of the British Raj in the region, been ruled by various local kings and chieftains. Territorial disputes were common between the two divisions and also occasionally included kings and chieftans from other regions, most prominently Nepal. In 1790, the Gorkha state under Prithvi Narayan Shah's successors forces conquered Kumaon. They entered Garhwal in 1791, besieged Langurgarhi and compelled the Garhwal kingdom to pay tribute, before occupying Garhwal in 1803–1804 under commanders including Amar Singh Thapa.

The Anglo-Nepalese War was fought between the East India Company and the Kingdom of Nepal from 1814 to 1816. Under the Treaty of Sugauli, concluded on 2 December 1815 and ratified on 4 March 1816, Nepal renounced its claims to the countries lying west of the Kali River. Following the Company's victory, Kumaon and most of Garhwal passed from Gorkha to Company control and was made part of the United Province of Agra and Oudh. A reduced Garhwal kingdom was restored to Sudarshan Shah and subsequently became the princely state of Tehri Garhwal. Tehri Garhwal remained a princely state until 1949. Under the Tehri-Garhwal Merger Agreement, signed on 18 May 1949, its administration was transferred to the Dominion of India on 1 August 1949 and integrated with the United Provinces. The former Company-administered districts and Tehri Garhwal subsequently formed part of Uttar Pradesh.

Some of the more notable proto-statehood movements arose as self-governance moments against the monarchy (as in Tehri) or as part of the wider Indian Freedom Struggle against the British Raj. Some prominent figures of the anti-monarchy movement like Sridev Suman became popular figures in the post-independence Statehood struggle.

== Uttarakhand State Formation Arguments ==
With the establishment of a firm democracy the demands for statehood in India have shifted from largely language, culture, ethnicity, religion, etc. based to demands for control over resources and more regional-governance, as these regions often perceive political apathy or neglect by the parent state government, which doesn't adequately invest in the region's development or fails to understand its unique requirements.

== Background ==
- As a unit of the Indian independence movement in
- 1913: The national general convention of the Indian National Congress was held in Uttarakhand, and was attended by many state representatives. That same year, Tamta Sudharini Sabha held a convention for the upliftment of the backward and oppressed people of the area, the Shilpkar Mahasabha in the state.
- 1916: In September, the Kumaon Parishad was founded by a few young activists; Pt Hargovind Vallabh Pant, Govind Ballabh Pant, Badri Datt Pandey, Indralal Shah, Mohan Singh Damarwal Chandra Lal Shah Prem Ballabh Pandey, Bhola Datt Pandey and Lakshmi Datt Shastri—with the main objective of solving social and economic problems of the hill region. By 1916, in addition to the local general reforms, certain political objectives were added to the organization's goals. In the Provincial elections of 1923 and 1926, Kumaon Parishad, Hargovind Vallabh Pant, Govind Vallabh Pant, Mukundi Lal, and Badri Datt Pandey won by a landslide.
- 1926: Kumaon Parishad was merged with the Indian National Congress.
- 1938: In May of that year, official sources of the British Raj reported the national general convention of the Indian National Congress held at Srinagar, Garhwal had Pandit Jawaharlal Nehru favoured the cause of the movement to enrich their culture.
- 1940: At the Haldwani conference, Badri Datt Pandey voiced a need to grant special status to the mountainous region. Anusuya Prasad Bahuguna proposed the formation of Kumaon - Garhwal as separate units.
- 1954: the Uttar Pradesh Legislative Council member Indra Singh Nayal demanded a separate development plan for the highlands to then Chief Minister of Uttar Pradesh, Govind Ballabh Pant.
- 1955: Justice Fazal Ali's commission recommended the formation of the hill region as a separate state to the Government of India.
- 1957: Deputy chairman of the Planning Commission, T. T. Krishnamachari suggested special attention be given to the issues of the hill region.
- 12 May 1970: then Prime Minister Indira Gandhi addressed the issues of the hill region and admitted that the diagnosis of the problems of the hill region is the responsibility of both State and Central Governments.

== Movement timeline ==
- 24 July 1979: The Uttarakhand Kranti Dal was founded in Mussoorie with the objective of the formation of a separate hill state.
- June 1987: at the party convention of UKD in Karnaprayag, party leaders called for the constitution of conflict and isolation. In November, UKD passed the party resolution for the formation of the new state in the memorandum and the party president also sought to include Haridwar in the proposed state.
- 1988: Indramani Badoni did a 105-day foot march under the banner of Uttarakhand Kranti Dal from Tawaghat in Pithoragarh to Dehradun. He went door to door in passing villages and campaigned to the people the benefits of a separate state.
- 1992: Badoni declared Gairsain the capital of Uttarakhand on the day of Makar Sankranti in Bageshwar.

== 1994 ==
In March 1994, Chief Minister Mulayam Singh Yadav's decided to implement the Mandal Commission's recommendation of reserving 27 percent of jobs in government and places in schools and colleges for Other Backward Class (OBC) persons. The thirteen districts in the Uttarakhand region contain less than two percent OBC population, thus the Bill was perceived as threatening educational and public employment opportunities for residents of the hills.

On 1 October 1994, around 7,000 Uttarakhand citizens began a march from Garhwal to New Delhi for rally to be held behind the Red Fort. The rally, organized by the Uttarakhand Samyukta Sangharsh Samiti (USSS), a coalition headed by the Uttarakhand Kranti Dal (UKD), came in response to the Reservation. On 2 October 1994, The activists peacefully taking part in the demonstration near Rampur Tiraha crossing, Muzaffarnagar were stopped by police, who fired upon, tear-gassed and lathi-charged the protesters and molested and raped several of the female participants.

Satya Pokhriyal was the leader who led all the people from the mishappening, with the other activists helping civilians and protestors alike. Several people were killed, and many were injured. This misadventure by the police added fuel to the fire of the Uttarakhand movement. The next day 3 October, the protests were called off for the demolition of firing and several deaths all over the region.

Students all over the region participated in the collective movement for separate statehood and reservations. The Uttarakhand movement was then further intensified in the field by the anti-Uttarakhand statement of then Chief Minister of Uttar Pradesh, Mulayam Singh Yadav. The leaders of UKD held fast-unto-death in support of their demand for a separate state. State government employees struck work for three months, and the events of the Uttarakhand movement got more intensified with the blockades and confrontation with the police. Uttarakhand activists in Mussoorie and Khatima were shot down by the police.

- On 7 October 1994, a female activist died after the brutal attack by police in Dehradun while she was protesting against Rampur Tiraha Firings, and the activists in return stormed the police station.
- On 15 October, a curfew took in Dehradun, and one activist was killed on the same day.
- On 27 October 1994, then Home Minister of India, Rajesh Pilot held the talks with the statehood activists. Meanwhile, at Sriyantra Tapu, Srinagar several activists were killed in a brutal attack by the police.

== Post-1994 ==
- 15 August 1996: Then Prime Minister H. D. Deve Gowda, of the Janta Dal-led United Front, announces the formation of a new state Uttaranchal from the Red Fort, Delhi.
- 1998: The BJP-led coalition government follows through the Red Fort announcement and sends the 'Uttaranchal Bill' to the Government of Uttar Pradesh through the President of India. With 26 amendments the Uttaranchal Bill was passed by the Uttar Pradesh Assembly and sent back to the Central Government.
- 27 July 2000: The Central Government presents the Uttar Pradesh Reorganisation Bill 2000 in the Parliament of India. It was passed by the Lok Sabha on 1 August 2000, and the Rajya Sabha passed the bill on 10 August 2000.
- 28 August 2000: Then President of India, K. R. Narayanan approved the Uttar Pradesh Reorganisation Bill and then it turned into Act on 9 November 2000 the new state Uttaranchal came into existence as the 27th state of India now known as Uttarakhand.

== Instances of violence ==
=== Khatima firing case ===
On 1 September 1994, police opened fire on activists resulting in the death of seven activists. This resulted in anger and mass agitation among people and students. Vijay Joshi S/o BB Joshi from Tanakpur intensified till 1995 and led a mass rally from Kumaon hills, Muzaffarnagar, Kotdwar to Delhi.

=== Mussoorie firing case ===
On 2 September 1994, to protest against the police action in the Khatima firing, a march was taken out in Mussoorie. At Jhulaghar, the constabulary opened fire on protestors leading to the death of Belmati Chauhan, Hansa Dhanai, Balbir Singh, Rai Singh Bangari, Madan Mamgain and Dhanpat Singh, and Circle Officer Uma Kant Tripathi. Apart from them, eighteen people were treated for bullet injuries.

=== Rampur Tiraha (Muzaffarnagar) firing case ===
The activists, part of the agitation for the separate state of Uttarakhand, were going to Delhi to stage a dharna, a sit-in protest at Raj Ghat on Gandhi Jayanti. The following day, when allegedly unprovoked police firing during the night of 1 October led to the death of six activists, and some women were allegedly brutally raped and molested in the ensuing melee. Mulayam Singh Yadav was Chief Minister of Uttar Pradesh when the incident occurred. Eight policemen, including three Inspectors, were proven guilty and prosecuted in the resulting case.

=== Dehradun firing case ===
The incident occurred on 3 October 1994 in Muzaffarnagar near Dehradun. The people were expected to be fierce. The situation following the funeral of Martyr Late Ravindra Rawat resulted in fierce battles between the police and protesters in the entire Dehradun. The police who were already prepared to suppress the uprising in any eventuality resorted to firing, which killed three people.

Late Rajesh Rawat's death was alleged to have been a result of firing from the house of the Samajwadi Party leader Suryakant Dhasmana.

=== Kotdwar case ===
On 3 October 1994, the whole of Uttarakhand was boiled in protest against the Rampur Tiraha incident and the police administration was ready to suppress it by any means. In this episode, there was also a movement in Kotdwar, in which two agitators were beaten to death by policemen with rifle butt strokes and sticks.

=== Nainital firing case ===
The protest was at its peak in Nainital too, but due to its leadership being in the hands of intellectuals, the police could not do anything, but they took out their anger on Pratap Singh, who worked in Hotel Pacific. RAF soldiers pulled him from the hotel and when he ran towards the hotel Meghdoot to escape, he was shot in the neck and killed.

=== Sriyantra Tapu (Srinagar) case ===
Activists started fast unto death on 7 November 1994, at Sriyantra Tapu situated near Srinagar, against these repressive actions and for the demand for the formation of a new state Uttarakhand. On 10 November 1994, the police climbed the island and caused havoc. Many people were injured badly. In the series of events, police attacked two young men using the lathi and hit them with the butt strokes of their guns. Police then threw those men into the river Alaknanda and hit them repeatedly with stones, resulting in the death of both activists.

Their bodies were not recovered by police for 15 days. The chairman of the ex-serviceman group (Virendra Prasad Kukshal) heard about the incident he began fast unto death for 7 days, and due to this Government agencies started the search and recovered the bodies. On 14 November 1994, the two dead bodies were found floating in the Alaknanda River near Bagwan.

== Notable figures ==
P.C. Joshi: a minister of the Communist Party, demanded from the Indian government the establishment of a separate state based on geographical and cultural differences. This plea brought forth a discussion on statehood while also taking into account the Karachi session (1931), wherein Jawahar Lal Nehru had also given his consent to a state separation.

Indramani Badoni: Often referred to as the "Mountain Gandhi", Indramani Badoni was at the forefront of the movement in Garhwal. In 1994, Badoni began a fast unto death in Pauri to demand a separate Uttarakhand state and was subsequently put in Muzaffarnagar jail.

== See also ==
- History of Uttarakhand
- Uttarakhand Kranti Dal
- Rampur Tiraha Firing Case
