= Chipko movement =

1970s Indian forest conservation movement

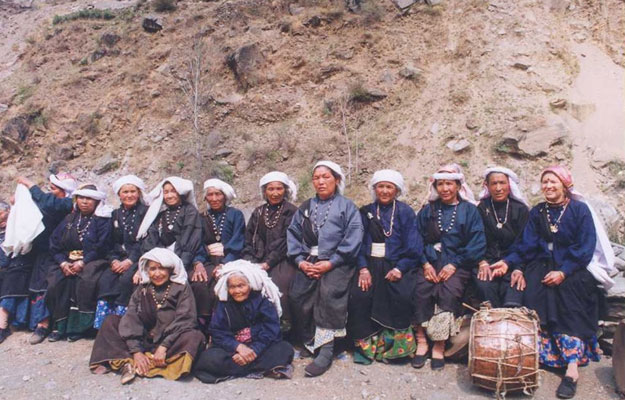
Participants of the first all-woman Chipko action at Reni village in 1974, reassembled thirty years later in 2004

The Chipko movement (Hindi: चिपको आन्दोलन, lit. 'hugging movement') is a forest conservation movement in India. Opposed to commercial logging and the government's policies on deforestation, protesters in the 1970s engaged in tree hugging, wrapping their arms around trees so that they could not be felled.

Today, beyond its eco-socialist reputation, the movement is seen increasingly as an ecofeminist one. Although many of its leaders were men, women had a much more significant participation, as they were the ones most affected by the rampant deforestation, which led to a lack of firewood, fodder and water for drinking and irrigation. Over the years the women also became primary stakeholders in a majority of the afforestation work that happened under the Chipko movement. In 1987, the Chipko movement was awarded the Right Livelihood Award "for its dedication to the conservation, restoration and ecologically-sound use of India's natural resources".

== Background ==
Inspired by Karan Singh and the Sarvodaya movement, in 1964 Dasholi Gram Swarajya Sangh ("Dasholi Society for Village Self-Rule"), was set up by Gandhian social worker Chandi Prasad Bhatt in Chamoli Gopeshwar, with an aim to set up small industries using the resources of the forest. Their first project was a small workshop making farm tools for local use. Its name was later changed to DGSM from the original Dashauli Gram Swarajya Sangh (DGSS) in the 1980s. The organisation had to face restrictive forest policies, a hangover of colonial era still prevalent, as well as the "contractor system". Under this system, pieces of forest land were commodified and auctioned to big contractors, usually from the plains, who brought along their own skilled and semi-skilled labourers, leaving only the menial jobs like hauling rocks for the hill people, and paying them next to nothing. On the other hand, the hill regions saw an influx of more people from the outside, which only added to the already strained ecological balance.

Hastened by increasing hardships, the Garhwal Himalayas soon became the centre for a growing ecological awareness of how reckless deforestation had denuded much of the forest cover, resulting in the devastating Alaknanda River floods of July 1970, when a major landslide blocked the river and affected an area starting from Hanumanchatti, near Badrinath to Haridwar 320 kilometers (200 miles) downstream. Numerous villages, bridges and roads were washed away. Thereafter, incidents of landslides and land subsidence became common in the area which was also simultaneously experiencing a rapid increase in civil engineering projects.

== Event ==
Villagers, including women, began to organise themselves into several smaller groups. The movement started in 1973, taking up local causes with the authorities, and standing up against commercial logging operations that threatened their livelihoods. In October 1971, the Sangha workers held a demonstration in Gopeshwar to protest against the policies of the Forest Department. More rallies and marches were held in late 1972, but to little effect, until a decision to take direct action was taken. The first such occasion occurred when the Forest Department turned down the Sangh's annual request for ten ash trees for its farm tools workshop, and instead awarded a contract for 300 trees to Simon Company, a sporting goods manufacturer in distant Allahabad, to make tennis racquets. In March 1973, the lumbermen arrived at Gopeshwar, and after a couple of weeks, they were confronted at village Mandal on 24 April 1973, where about a hundred villagers and DGSS workers were beating drums and shouting slogans, thus forcing the contractors and their lumbermen to retreat.

This was the first confrontation of the movement. The contract was eventually cancelled and awarded to the Sangh instead. By now, the issue had grown beyond the mere procurement of an annual quota of the ash trees and encompassed a growing concern over commercial logging and the government's forest policy, which the villagers saw as unfavourable towards them. The Sangh also decided to resort to tree-hugging, or Chipko, as a means of non-violent protest. But the struggle was far from over, as the same company was awarded more ash trees in the Phata forest, 80 km (50 miles) away from Gopeshwar. Here again, due to local opposition, starting on 20 June 1974, the contractors retreated after a stand-off that lasted a few days. Thereafter, the villagers of Phata and Tarsali formed a vigil group and watched over the trees until December, when they had another successful stand-off when the activists reached the site in time. The lumbermen retreated, leaving behind the five ash trees that had been felled.

A few months later, the final flashpoint began when the government announced an auction scheduled in January 1974, for 2,500 trees near Reni village, overlooking the Alaknanda River. Bhatt set out for the villages in the Reni area and incited the villagers, who decided to protest against the actions of the government by hugging the trees. Over the next few weeks, rallies and meetings continued in the Reni area.

On 25 March 1974, the day the lumbermen were to cut the trees, the men of Reni village and DGSS workers were in Chamoli, diverted by the state government and contractors to a fictional compensation payment site, while back home, labourers arrived by the truckload to start logging operations. A local girl rushed to inform Gaura Devi, the head of the village Mahila Mangal Dal, at Reni village (Laata was her ancestral home and Reni adopted home). Gaura Devi led 27 of the village women to the site and confronted the loggers. When all talks failed, and the loggers started to shout and abuse the women, threatening them with guns, the women resorted to hugging the trees to stop them from being felled. The women kept an all-night vigil guarding their trees against the cutters until a few of them relented and left the village. The next day, when the men and leaders returned, the news of the movement spread to the neighbouring Laata and other villages, including Henwalghati, and more people joined in. Eventually, after a four-day stand-off, the contractors left.

== Effect ==
The news soon reached the state capital, where the state Chief Minister, Hemwati Nandan Bahuguna, set up a committee to look into the matter, which eventually ruled in favour of the villagers. This became a turning point in the history of eco-development struggles in the region and around the world.

The struggle soon spread across many parts of the region, and such spontaneous stand-offs between the local community and timber merchants occurred at several locations, with hill women demonstrating their new-found power as non-violent activists. As the movement gathered shape under its leaders, the name Chipko movement was attached to their activities. According to Chipko historians, the term originally used by Bhatt was the word "angalwaltha" in the Garhwali language for "embrace", which later was adapted to the Hindi word, Chipko, which means to stick.

Over the next five years, the movement spread to many districts in the region, and within a decade throughout the Uttarakhand Himalayas. Larger issues of ecological and economic exploitation of the region were raised. The villagers demanded that no forest-exploiting contracts should be given to outsiders and that local communities should have effective control over natural resources like land, water, and forests. They wanted the government to provide low-cost materials to small industries and ensure the development of the region without disturbing the ecological balance. The movement took up economic issues of landless forest workers and asked for guarantees of a minimum wage. Globally, Chipko demonstrated how environmental causes, up until then considered an activity of the rich, were a matter of life and death for the poor, who were all too often the first ones to be devastated by an environmental tragedy. Several scholarly studies were made in the aftermath of the movement. In 1977, in another area, women tied sacred threads, called Rakhi, around trees destined for felling. According to the Hindu tradition of Raksha Bandhan, the Rakhi signifies a bond between brother and sisters. They declared that the trees would be saved even if it cost them their lives.

Women's participation in the Chipko agitation was a very novel aspect of the movement. The forest contractors of the region usually doubled up as suppliers of alcohol to men. Women held sustained agitations against the habit of alcoholism and broadened the agenda of the movement to cover other social issues. The movement achieved a victory when the government issued a ban on felling of trees in the Himalayan regions for fifteen years in 1980 by then Prime Minister Indira Gandhi, until the green cover was fully restored. One of the prominent Chipko leaders, Gandhian Sunderlal Bahuguna, took a 5,000 kilometre (3000 mile) trans-Himalaya foot march in 1981–83, spreading the Chipko message to a far greater area. Gradually, women set up cooperatives to guard local forests, and also organized fodder production at rates conducive to local environment. Next, they joined in land rotation schemes for fodder collection, helped replant degraded land, and established and ran nurseries stocked with species they selected.

== Participants ==
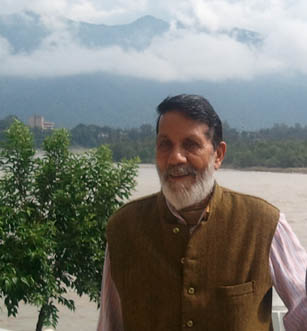
Chandi Prasad Bhatt one of the key leaders of the movement.

One of Chipko's most salient features was the mass participation of female villagers. As the backbone of Uttarakhand's agrarian economy, women were most directly affected by environmental degradation and deforestation, and thus related to the issues most easily. How much of this participation was impacted by or derived from the ideology of Chipko has been fiercely debated in academic circles.

Despite this, both female and male activists did play pivotal roles in the movement, including Gaura Devi, Sudesha Devi, Bachni Devi, Chandi Prasad Bhatt, Sundarlal Bahuguna, Govind Singh Rawat, Dhoom Singh Negi, Shamsher Singh Bisht and Ghanasyam Raturi, the Chipko poet, whose songs are still popular in the Himalayan region. Chandi Prasad Bhatt was awarded the Ramon Magsaysay Award in 1982, and Sunderlal Bahuguna was awarded the Padma Vibhushan in 2009.

== Legacy ==
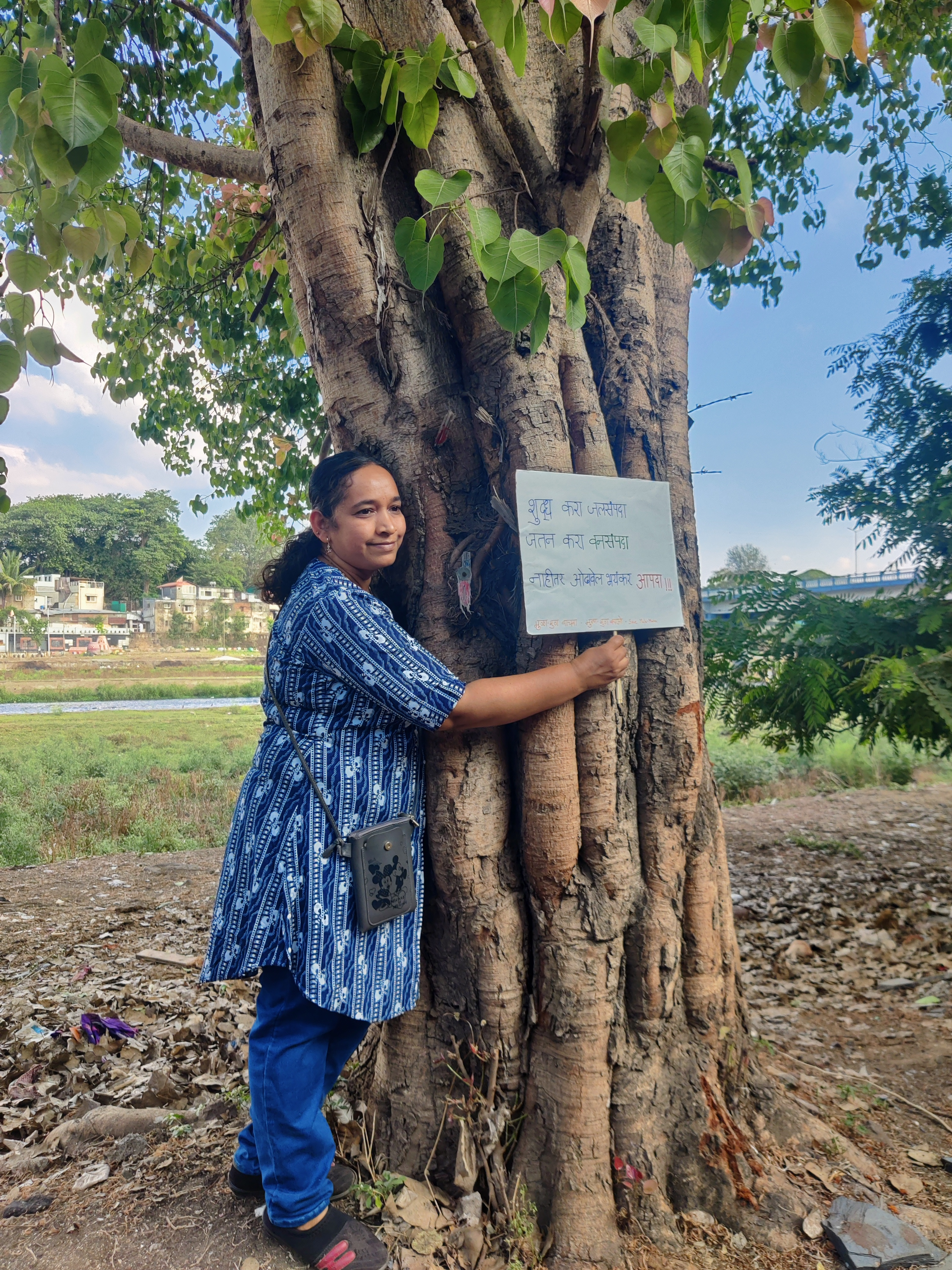
A Chipko protester at a development project in Pune, 2023

In Tehri District, Chipko activists would go on to protest limestone mining in the Doon Valley in the 1980s, as the movement spread through the Dehradun district, which had earlier seen deforestation of its forest cover leading to heavy loss of flora and fauna. Finally quarrying was banned after years of agitation by Chipko activists, followed by a vast public drive for afforestation, which turned around the valley, just in time. Also in the 1980s, activists like Bahuguna protested against construction of the Tehri dam on the Bhagirathi River, which went on for the next two decades, before founding the Beej Bachao Andolan, the Save the Seeds movement, that continues to the present day.

Over time, as a United Nations Environment Programme report mentioned, Chipko activists started "working a socio-economic revolution by winning control of their forest resources from the hands of a distant bureaucracy which is only concerned with the selling of forestland for making urban-oriented products". The Chipko movement became a benchmark for socio-ecological movements in other forest areas of Himachal Pradesh, Rajasthan and Bihar; in September 1983, Chipko inspired a similar, Appiko movement in Karnataka state of India, where tree felling in the Western Ghats and Vindhyas was stopped. In Kumaon region, Chipko took on a more radical tone, combining with the general movement for a separate Uttarakhand state, which was eventually achieved in 2001.

In recent years, the movement not only inspired numerous people to work on practical programmes of water management, energy conservation, afforestation, and recycling, but also encouraged scholars to start studying issues of environmental degradation and methods of conservation in the Himalayas and throughout India.

On 26 March 2004, Reni, Laata, and other villages of the Niti Valley celebrated the 30th anniversary of the Chipko movement, where all the surviving original participants united. The celebrations started at Laata, the ancestral home of Gaura Devi, where Pushpa Devi, wife of late Chipko Leader Govind Singh Rawat, Dhoom Singh Negi, Chipko leader of Henwalghati, Tehri Garhwal, and others were celebrated. From here a procession went to Reni, the neighbouring village, where the actual Chipko action took place on 26 March 1974. This marked the beginning of worldwide methods to improve the present situation. Recently, by following the legacy of the Chipko movement, in 2017 rapid deforestation over the century-old trees, forming almost a canopy in Jessore Road of the district of North 24 Parganas, West Bengal, has also sparked a huge movement in the form of the campaign of saving 4000 trees by the local masses.

As more people inhabit cities, the legend of Chipko has made its way into urban campaigns. In February 2025, more than 5000 citizen protesters from Pune and Pimpri-Chinchwad cities congregated and marched to the confluence of Ramnadi and Mula rivers. Voicing opposition to the Riverfront Development project, people hugged trees in the sacred grove called Ram-Mula Devrai.

On 26 March 2018, a Chipko movement conservation initiative was marked by a Google Doodle on its 45th anniversary.

== See also ==
- Indian Council of Forestry Research and Education
- Khejarli massacre
- List of forest research institutes in India
- Sunderlal Bahuguna
- Van Mahotsav
- Van Vigyan Kendra (VVK) Forest Science Centres
- Devrai
