= Dabral =

Indian family name

- Pronunciation: /dæbˈrəl/ DAB-rəl; Hindi pronunciation: [ɖəbˈraːl]

Origin
- Meaning: derived from a village named Dabar, meaning "originated from Dabar"
- Region of origin: pauri Garhwal district, Uttarakhand, India

Other names
- See also: Bahuguna, Barthwal, Chandola, Gairola, Hatwal, Naudiyal, Nautiyal, Semwal, Uniyal, Nailwal

Dabral (ISO: Ḍabrāl), is a surname found in the Hindu community of Garhwali Gangari Brahmins primarily living in the Garhwal region of Uttarakhand. Members of this community are also found in Tehri Garhwal and Kumaon.

According to their traditions, Dabrals are the descendants of the sage Bharadwaja. Adherent of the Shaivism sect, they do worship Shiva as their prime deity.

== Etymology ==
The word Dabral is a Middle Indo-Aryan word, derived from a village named Dabar, meaning "originated from Dabar". Dabar word is present in many modern Indo-Aryan languages meaning a small lake or pond in a country area. There are many villages named Dabar and its local variations like Dabra or Dabri scattered throughout Indian Subcontinent.

== History ==
According to Rahul Sankrityayan's book Himalaya Parichaya: Garhwal (transl. Introduction of the Himalayas: Garhwal), the Dabrals were originally inhabitants of Maharashtra in Western India, from where they migrated to the Himalayas in the north as a result of the Islamic invasion in the 14th century A.D.

The same source cites that two Gaud Saraswat Brahmin brothers from Maharashtra named Raghunath and Vishwanath migrated to the Garhwal region in the year 1376 A.D. where they first settled at the hilly village Dabar in Pauri Garhwal district near the town Lansdowne in present-day Uttarakhand, hence the surname Dabral. Modern day Dabrals are considered their descendants.

== Notable people with the name Dabral ==
- Shivprasad Dabral Charan; historian and writer from Uttarakhand
- Dabral Baba (born Govind Prasad Kukreti); Indian yogi and mystic
- Manglesh Dabral; Indian poet

== See also ==
- Sarola Brahmin
- Garhwal Kingdom
- Garhwali language
