= Garhwali people =

Ethnolinguistic group from Uttarakhand, India

Regions with significant populations
- Garhwal in Uttarakhand, India

Languages
- Garhwali

Religion
- Hinduism

Related ethnic groups
- Kumaoni people, Khas people

The Garhwali people are an Indo-Aryan ethnolinguistic group who speak Garhwali, a Central Pahari language and are native to the Garhwal division of the Indian state of Uttarakhand.

== Etymology ==
In modern usage, "Garhwali" is used to refer to anyone whose linguistic, cultural, and ancestral or genetic origins is from the Garhwal Himalayas. Their ethnonym is derived from the word 'Garhwal' or 'Gadwal'.

The earliest reference to this region is in the Skanda Purana which called it Kedar Khand and Himvat. It describes the area that contained Gangadwar (Haridwar and Kankhala), Badrinath, Gandhamardan, and Kailash.

== History ==
=== Garhwal Kingdom ===
Location of Uttarakhand within India

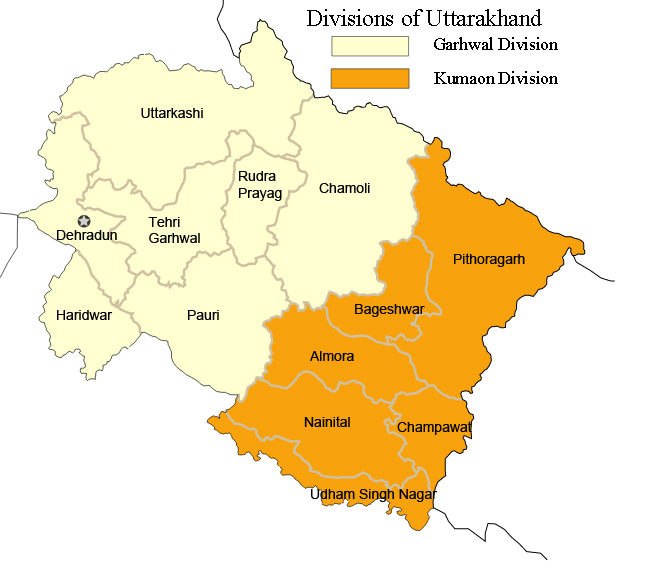
Location of Garhwal in Uttarakhand

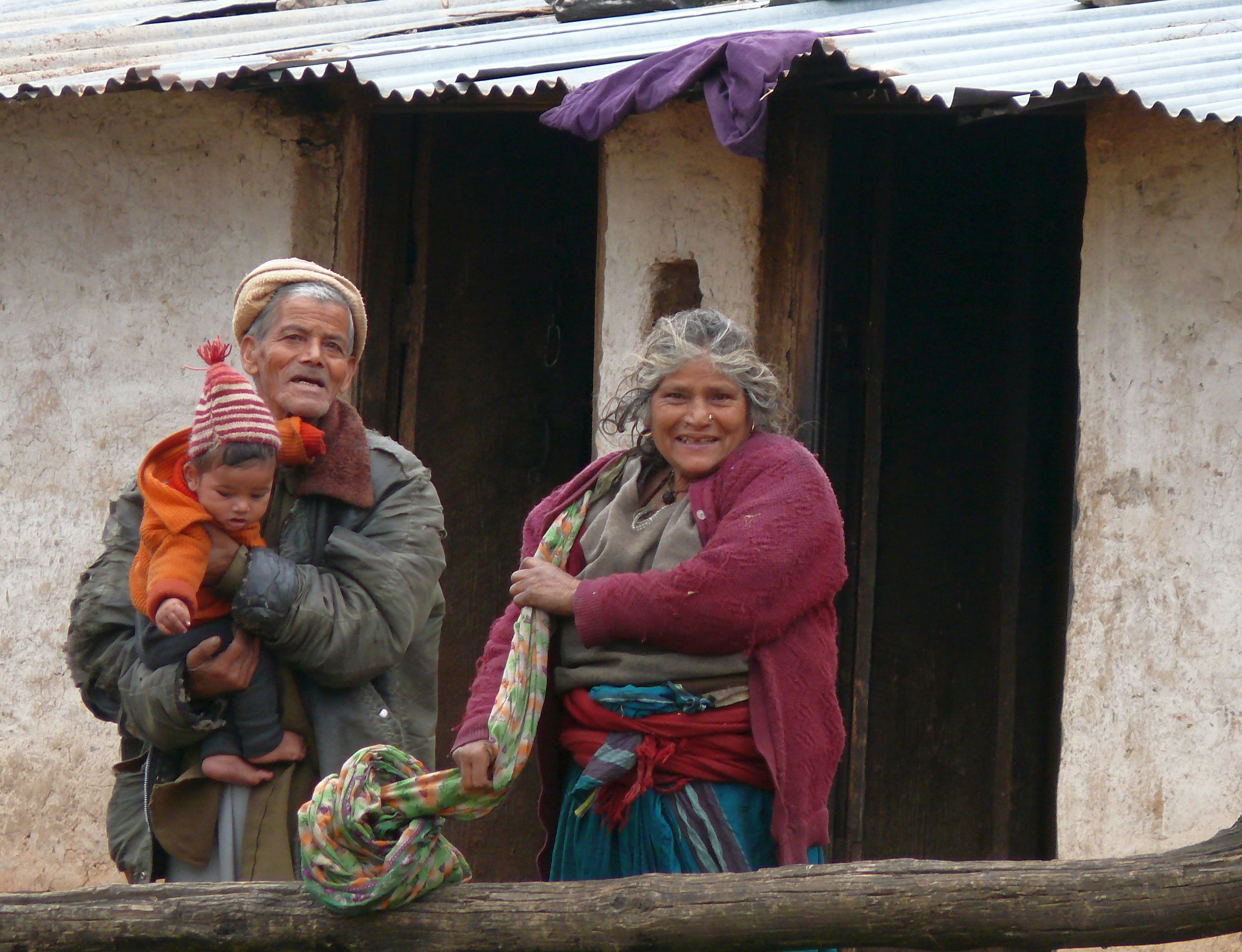
A couple in a village at Uttarakhand, India

The Kingdom of Garhwal was founded by Parmars. The area comprises 52 principalities called garhs (fortresses). These were small and had their own chiefs who were responsible for the welfare of the garhs. The Parmar dynasty ruled the Kingdom until 1803 before the "Gurkhas" invaded Kumaon and Garhwal, driving the Garhwal chief into the plains. For 12 years the Gurkhas ruled the country with an iron rod, until a series of encroachments by them on British territory led to the Anglo–Nepalese War in 1814.

At the termination of the campaign, Garhwal and Kumaon were converted into British districts, while the Tehri principality was restored to a son of the former chief (that is King Pradymun), King Sudarshan Shah. A part of this kingdom was taken by the British, and later, it became known as the British Garhwal which spread over the area of 5,629 mi^{2} (14,580 km^{2}). After British rule, Garhwal made rapid development. Two battalions of the Indian army (the 39th Garhwal Rifles) were deployed in the area, stationed at the military cantonment of Lansdowne. Grain was one of the major corps of this area. Apart from this, cloth, while salt, borax, livestock, and wool were imported from Tibet. The administrative headquarters of the area were established at Pauri. Srinagar (Garhwal) was the largest city and served as an important trade center along with the town of Kotdwara which is situated at Oudh and Rohilkhand railway tracks. Later, it became a part of the Punjab Hill States Agency of British India. Most of the Uttarkashi district acceded to the Union of India in 1949.

Garhwali are known for their courage because they were preferred by the British as an army. Garhwali Kingdom was one of the few kingdoms that never came under the Muslim rule influence.

The history of Garhwal is older than that of Ramayana and Mahabharata. Worshipping Lord Shiva is attributing reverent honour and homage to him. According to the great Mahabharata, Garhwal is believed to be the land where the Vedas and the Shastras were made.

== Language ==
The Garhwali language (गढ़वळि भाख/भासा) is primarily spoken by the Garhwali people of the north-western Garhwal Division from the northern Indian state of Uttarakhand in the Indian Himalayas. The Garhwali language is classified as a Central Pahari language belonging to the Northern Zone of Indo-Aryan languages. Garhwali is one of the 325 recognised languages of India which is spoken by over 2,267,314 people such as in districts of Tehri Garhwal, Pauri Garhwal (except Kotdwar), Uttarkashi (except Bangan, Ravain and Parvat areas), Chamoli and Rudraprayag districts of Uttarakhand.

The language has many regional dialects including: Srinagari, Tehri (Gangapariya), Badhani, Dessaulya, Lohbya, Majh-Kumaiya, Bhattiani, Nagpuriya, Rathi, Salani (Pauri), Gangadi (Uttarkashi), Chandpuri. Srinagari dialect is the literary standard, while Pauri is generally regarded as the prominent one.

However, for a number of reasons, Garhwali is a rapidly shrinking language. The UNESCO Atlas of the World's Endangered Languages book authored by "Theo Baumann" has described Garhwali language one of the moribund languages that needs to be protected.

== Local deities ==
Chota Char Dham

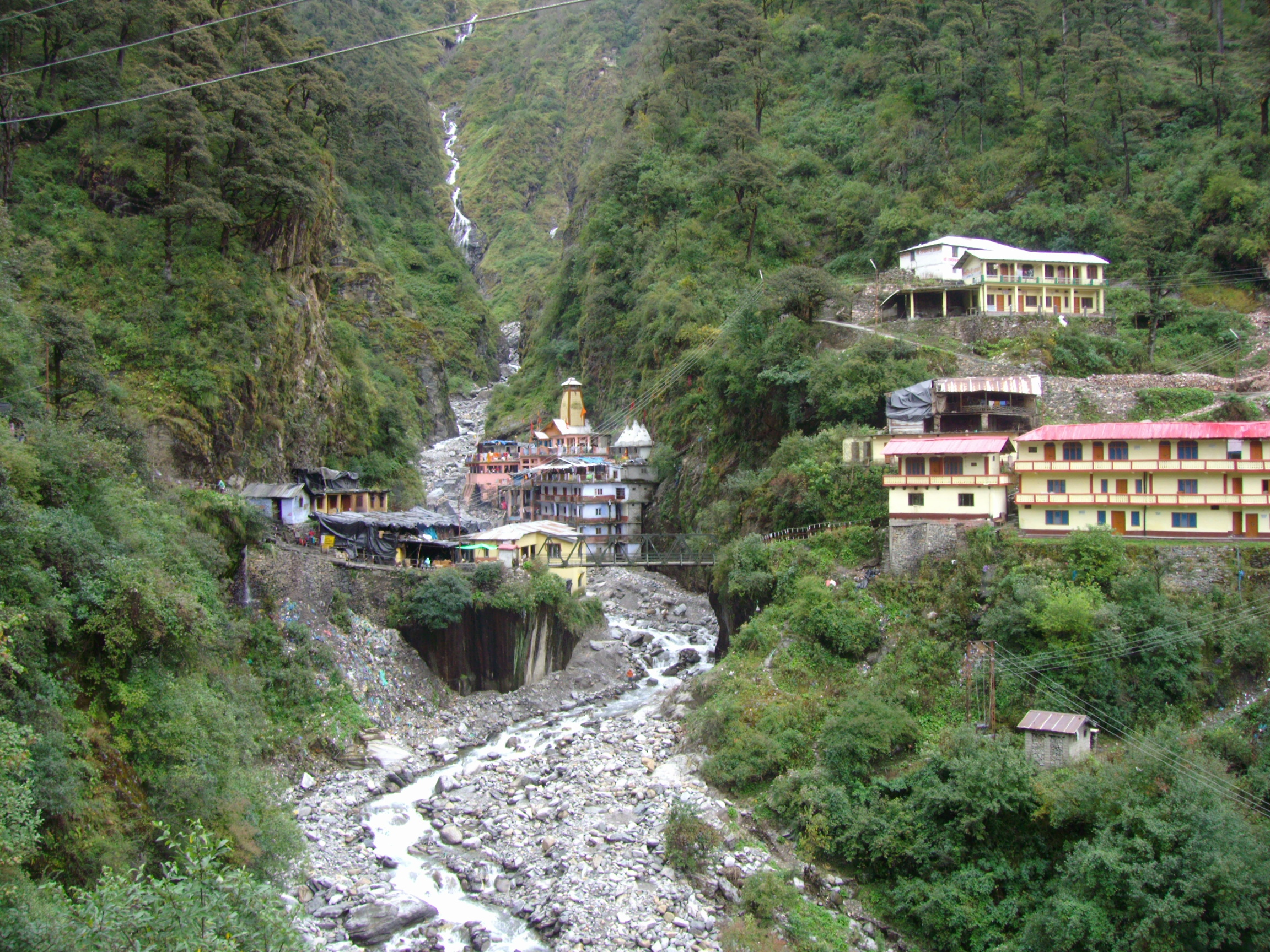
Yamunotri

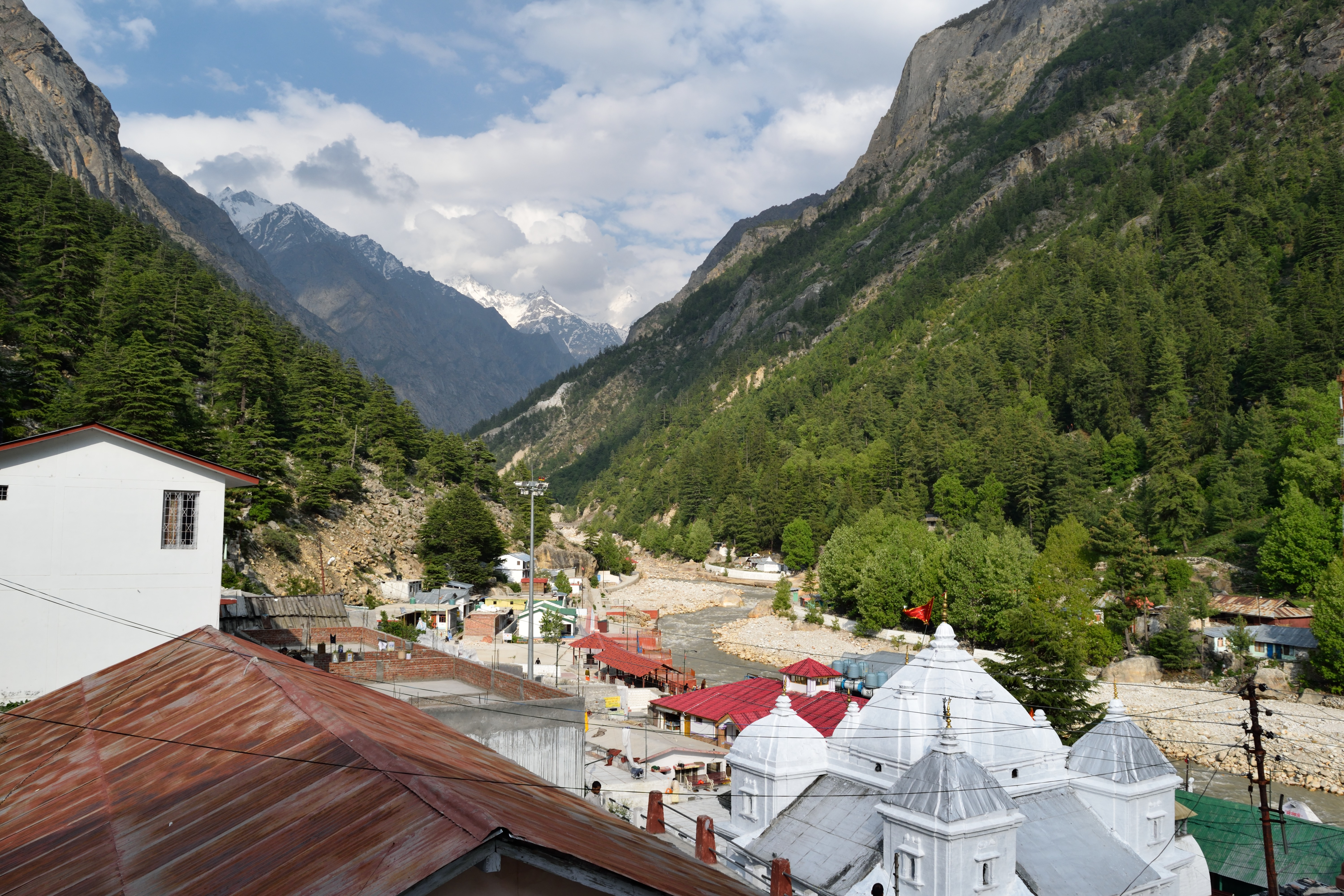
Gangotri

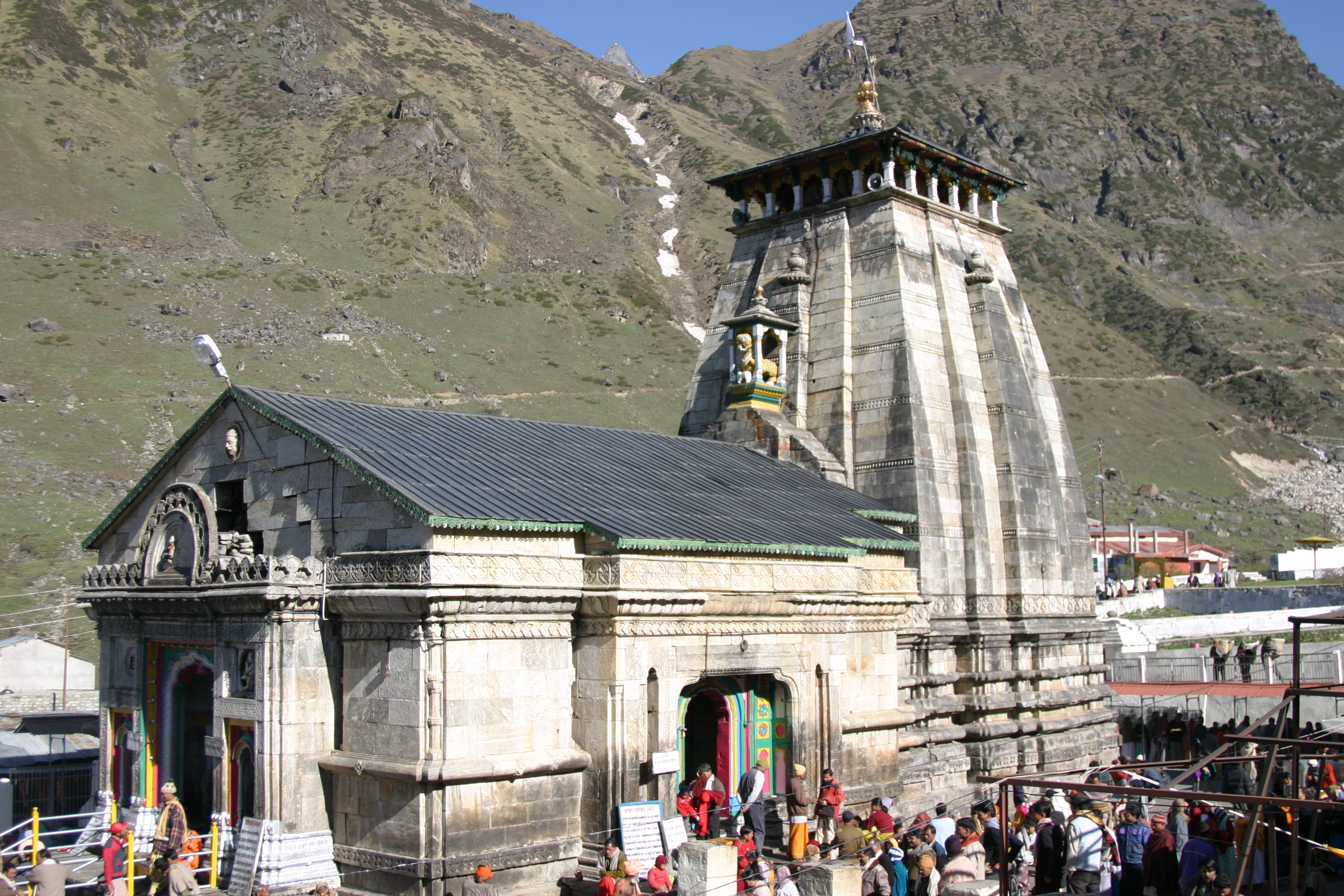
Kedarnath

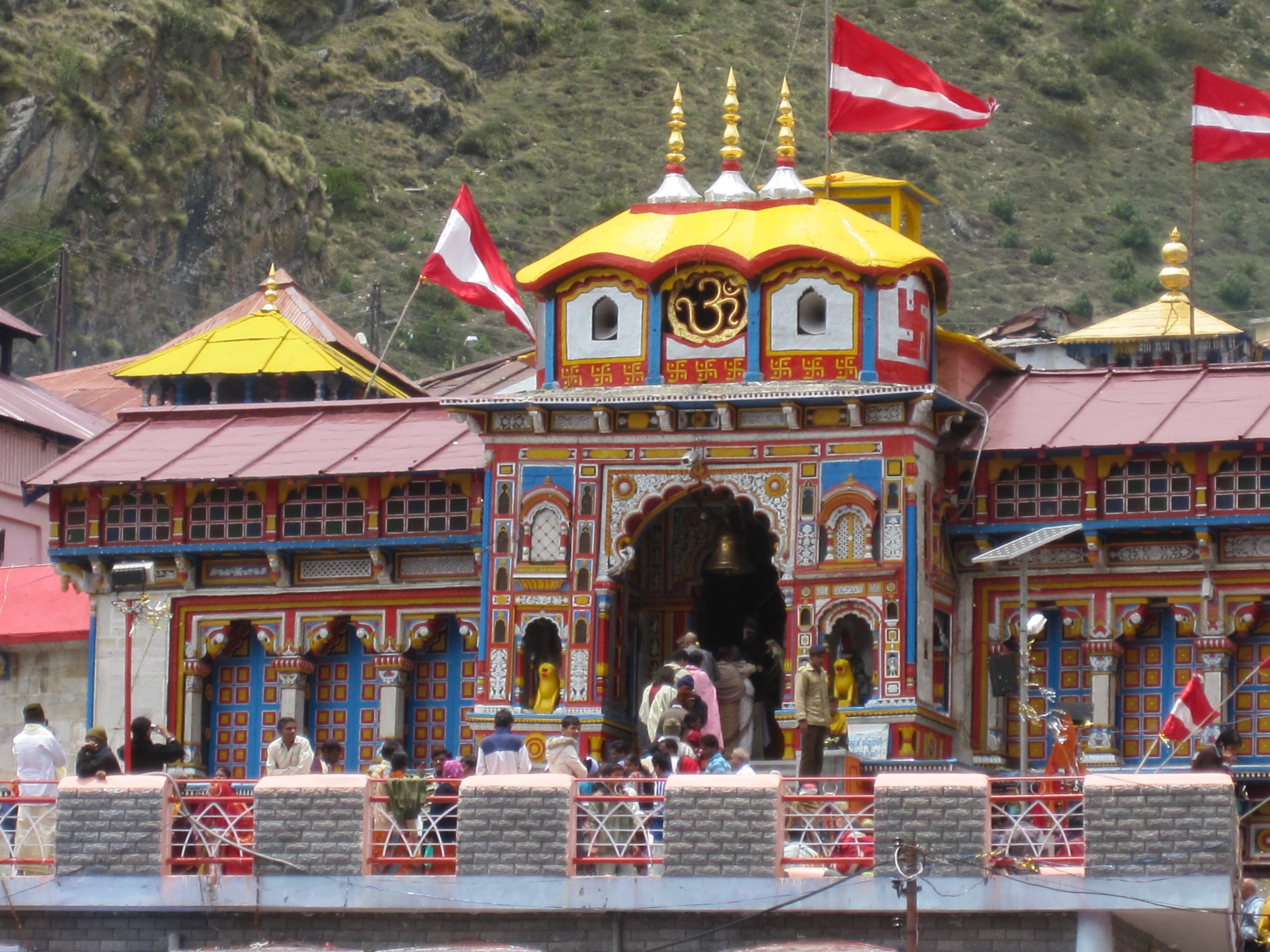
Badrinath

Chandrabadni Devi Temple is located in Tehri Garhwal. The temple can be reached either from 8 kilometres (5.0 mi) long rout Kandikhal to Srinagar-Tehri or 9 kilometres (5.6 mi)) long Jamnikhal en route Dev Prayag-Tehri via a link road of Jurana. It can also be reached via (1.5 kilometres (0.93 mi)) long bridle path.

The temple administration body organises several annual events including cultural and religious seminars.

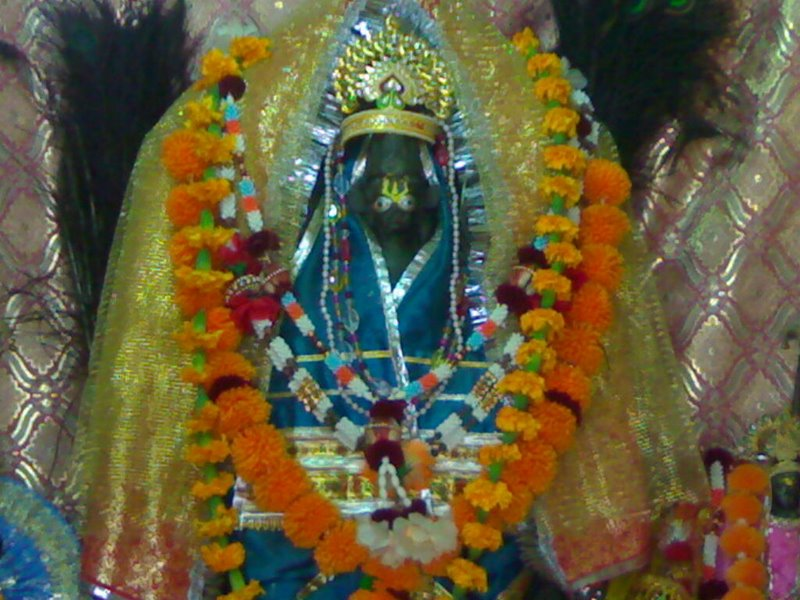
Umra Narayan

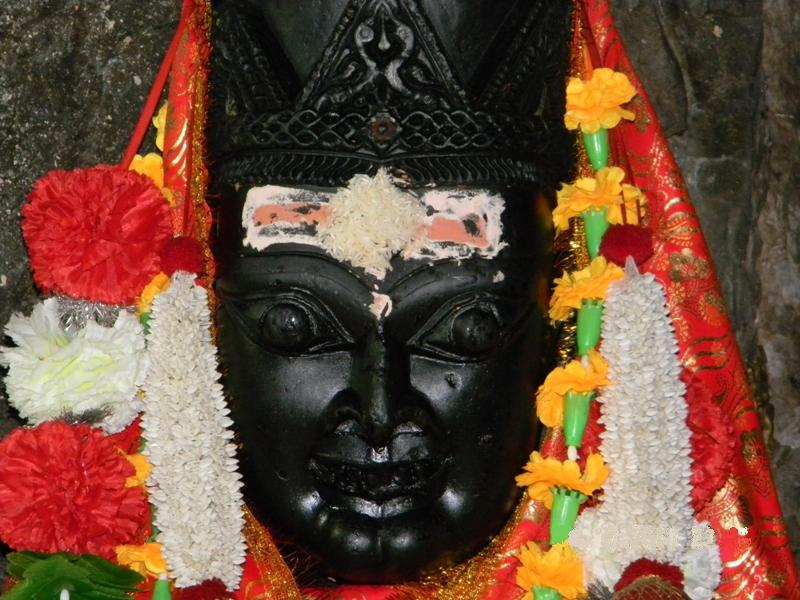
Dhari Devi

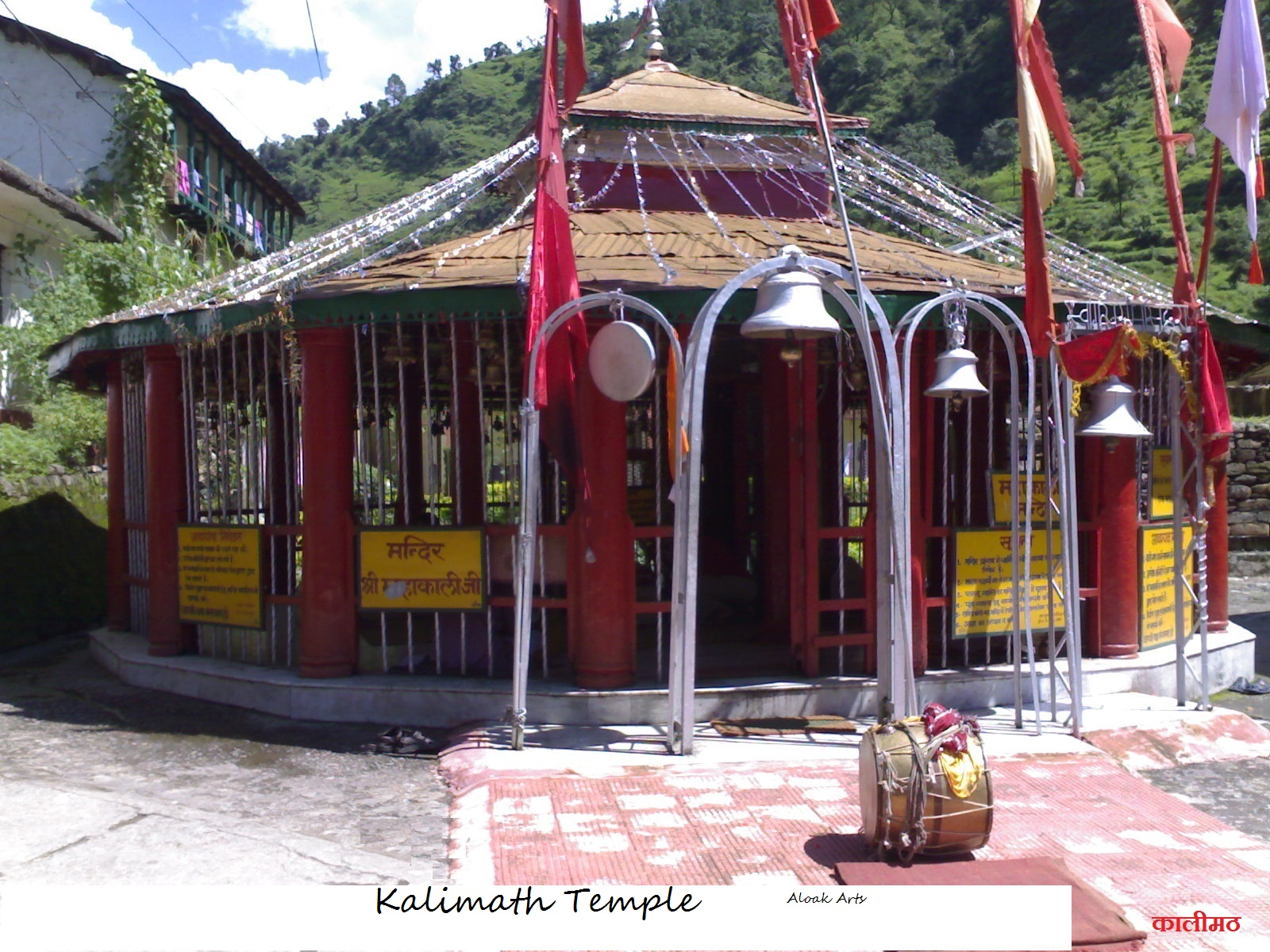
Kalimath

Umra Narayan is situated between the mystic and peaceful hills of Rudraprayag where "Devine" temple of Lord Umra Narayan (Isth Dev of gram sann) is located. According to mythology, this temple was built during the time of Adi Shankracharya, and is believed that it was constructed by Adi Shankracharya when he was on his way to Lord Badrinath's temple. The temple has been now renovated and is 5–7 kilometres (3.1–4.3 mi) away from the central city of Rudraprayag.

It is also believed that most of the "Isth Devas" in the Garhwal region are the incarnation of "Lord Vishnu" (Narsingh Dev Ji), and sometimes even the incarnation of "Vishnu" itself.

Koteshwar Mahadev is located about three kilometres inside the 'heart' of Rudraprayag, Koteshwar Mahadev temple. It is dedicated to Lord Shiva. This place is presumed to be the same spot where Lord Shiva was stopped for meditation where he was on his way to Kedarnath. According to local mythology, this temple has its presence since the time of Bhasmasur (the Deadly Asur/demon), who received a boon from "Shiva" that turned a head into Bhasma or ashes whenever he touched with boon to anyone's head. Lord Shiva accompanied by another one reached to a cave which was the home of Lord Shiva, and finally lord "Vishnu" helped him by killing the demon. The temple is filled with fantastic energy/aura, and one can feel it. Few drops of water are continually running through the hill.

Dhari Devi temple of "Dhari Devi" is situated on the banks of the river Alaknanda. One has to travel 15 kilometres (9.3 mi) from Srinagar (Pauri Garhwal) on Srinagar-Badrinath highway to Kaliya Saur, and then turn down where one has to travel half of a kilometre towards Alaknanda river. The upper part of Goddess "Kali" is worshipped here. According to the local people, the face of the idol changes as a girl, a woman, and an old lady according to the passage of time. This idol is located in an open area. Many times, villagers and some philanthropists tried to build a roof for Goddess, but their efforts returned empty handed as the roof gets dismantle every time. As per "Srimad Devi Bhagwat", there are 108 Shakta pithas as in India, and this is one of them.

Kalimath, also known as "Kaviltha", is a village which is regarded as a divine place and Shakta pitha. It lies at an altitude of around 6,000 feet (1,800 m) (1,800 m) on the river Saraswati in the Himalayas, surrounded by the peaks of Kedarnath in Rudraprayag district of Uttarakhand. Kalimath is situated close to Ukhimath and Guptakashi. It is one of the "Siddha Peeths" of the region and is regarded a respectful place with religious importance. The temple of the goddess Kali is located in this village and is visited by many devotees throughout the year, especially during the "Navratras". There are 108 Shakta pithas in India, and this is one of them as described in the "Srimad Devi Bhagwat". The upper part of goddess Kali is worshipped in "Dhari Devi". Goddess Kali killed the demon "Raktavija" here in this area. After killing the demon, they went under the earth. Usually they have their own pantheon consisted of rural deities who are worshipped through Jagar (ritual), these deities include Narsingh, Bhairav, Nagaraja (Nagaraja is believed to be form of Krishna according to local legends), Pandav and Draupadi etc. This pantheon was headed by Durga and Mahadev, who is referred to by many names such as Bhagwati, Surkanda, Kali, Bhavani, Nanda etc. They also worship their ancestors who were locally known as Bhumiyal, which literally means guardians of Land each and every Garhwali villages have their own Bhumiyal they are worshipped in a small stone made shrine known as Thaan where they are represented by small rocks placed inside the thaan. Usually during the crops were offered to Bhumiyal as a way to thanking them for protecting the village.

== Notable people ==
=== Film and television ===
==== Hindi cinema ====
- Brijendra Kala (actor, dialogue writer)
- Chitrashi Rawat (actress)
- Deepak Dobriyal (actor)
- Himani Shivpuri (actress)
- Jagat Rawat (actor)
- Madhurima Tuli (actress)
- Priyanshu Painyuli (actor)
- Sanjay Khanduri (director)
- Tigmanshu Dhulia (dialogue writer, director, actor, screenwriter, producer and casting director)
- Tripti Dimri (actress)
- Urvashi Rautela (actress)
- Varun Badola (actor)

==== Television ====
- Aditi Sajwan (actress)
- Alka Kaushal (actress)
- Asha Negi (actress)
- Barkha Sengupta (actress)
- Priyanka Kandwal (actress)
- Raghav Juyal (dancer, choreographer and actor)
- Shivangi Joshi (actress)
- Shruti Bisht (actress)
- Shruti Ulfat (actress)

==== Radio ====
- Abhilash Thapliyal (radio jockey and actor)

==== Beauty pageants ====
- Anukriti Gusain (actress, Femina Miss India, Miss Asia Pacific World 2014)
- Manasvi Mamgai (model, Femina Miss India 2010)

==== Hollywood ====
- Navi Rawat (Indian-American actress)

==== Folk music ====
- Basanti Bisht (folk singer, Padma Shri award recipient)
- Chander Singh Rahi (folk singer, composer, poet musician)
- Jeet Singh Negi (folk singer)
- Meena Rana (folk singer)
- Narendra Singh Negi (folk singer and composer, Padma Shri and Sangeet Natak Akademi Award recipient)
- Pritam Bhartwan (folk singer, Padma Shri award recipient)

=== Art ===
- Abodh Bandhu Bahuguna (Hindi writer and poet)
- Ganga Prasad Vimal (Hindi writer and poet)
- Leeladhar Jagudi (Hindi writer, poet, Padma Shri and Sahitya Akademi Award recipient)
- Manglesh Dabral (Hindi writer, poet and journalist, Sahitya Akademi Award recipient)
- Mola Ram (18th century Indian painter, who originated the Garhwal branch of the Pahari/Kangra school of painting)
- Ranbir Singh Bisht (Indian painter and the Principal of the College of Fine Arts, Lucknow University, Padma Shri and Lalit Kala Akademi Fellowship recipient)
- Taradutt Gairola (lawyer, author, editer)
- Viren Dangwal (Hindi writer, poet, journalist and academician, Sahitya Akademi Award recipient)
- Girish Tiwari (Hindi/Kumaoni poet and folk singer)
- Shekhar Pathak (historian, editor, publisher, activist, traveller associated with the Chipko movement)

=== Social work and activism ===
- Anil Prakash Joshi (environmentalist, Padma Shri and Padma Bhushan recipient)
- Chandi Prasad Bhatt (environmentalist, Chipko movement leader, Padma Bhushan and Ramon Magsaysay Award recipient)
- Gaura Devi (Leader of Mahila Mangal Dal of Chipko movement) - Indira Priyadarshini Vrikshamitra Award recipient)
- Kunwar Singh Negi (braille editor and social worker, Padma Shri and Padma Bhushan recipient)
- Sunderlal Bahuguna (environmentalist, Chipko movement leader, Padma Vibhushan recipient)

==== Indian independence movement ====
- Nagendra Saklani (Indian revolutionary and freedom fighter)
- Ram Prasad Nautiyal (Indian freedom fighter and politician)
- Sri Dev Suman (Indian freedom fighter, journalist and civil rights leader)

=== Historical figures ===
- Teelu Rauteli, folk heroine of Garhwal, Uttarakhand

=== Religion ===
- Dabral Baba (Indian yogi and mystic)
- Hans Maharaj (Indian spiritual leader)
- Prem Rawat (Indian American spiritual leader, founder of the Divine Light Mission)
- Swami Rama (founder of the Himalayan Institute Hospital Trust)

=== Science and academics ===
- Anand Sharan Raturi (economist and first vice-chancellor of Mahatma Jyotiba Phule Rohilkhand University)
- Aditya Narayan Purohit (Plant physiologist, Padma Shri awarded and vice-chancellor of H.N.B. Garhwal University)
- Anirudh Kala (psychiatrist)
- Chandra Prakash Kala (ecologist)
- Prem Lal Joshi (accounting researcher and professor)
- Ruchi Badola (ecologist)
- Vijay Prasad Dimri (geophysical scientist, Padma Shri recipient)

=== Indian Armed Forces ===
==== Gallantry award recipients ====
- Naik Darwan Singh Negi, Victoria Cross from 1st Battalion of 39th Garhwal Rifles
- Rifleman Gabar Singh Negi, Victoria Cross from 2nd Battalion, 39th Garhwal Rifles (posthumous)
- Havildar Gajender Singh Bisht, Operation Black Tornado 2008, Ashoka Chakra (posthumous)
- Rifleman Jaswant Singh Rawat, hero of Indo-China War, 1962; Maha Vir Chakra (posthumous)

==== Prominent names ====
- General Bipin Rawat, Chief of Defence Staff and former Chief of the Army Staff
- Lt. Gen. Anil Chauhan, Director General of Military Operations (DGMO), Indian Army
- Lt. Gen. Anil Kumar Bhatt, General Officer Commanding (GOC) XV Corps, also called as the "Chinar Corps" of the Indian Army, former Director-General of Military Operations (DGMO), Indian Army.
- Lt. Gen. Jaiveer Singh Negi, Commandant of Indian Military Academy, Indian Army
- Lt. Gen. Balwant Singh Negi (Retd.), former General Officer Commander-in-Chief (GOC-in-C), Central Command, Indian Army
- Lt. Gen. Madan Mohan Lakhera (Retd.), former Governor of Mizoram, former Lieutenant Governor of Puducherry
- Lt. Gen. Tejpal Singh Rawat (Retd.), former Director General of the Assam Rifles, Indian Army and former MP Lok Sabha
- Director-General Rajendra Singh, former Director General of the Indian Coast Guard
- Maj. Gen. B. C. Khanduri (Retd.), former Union Minister of Surface Transport, former Chief Minister of Uttarakhand and former MP Lok Sabha
- Air Marshal Brijesh Dhar Jayal (Retd.), PVSM AVSM VM & Bar (served as Air Officer Commanding-in-Chief of South Western Air Command & Deputy Chief of Air Staff).
- Air Marshal Arvindra Singh Butola, Air Officer Commander-in-Chief (AOC-in-C), Training Command, Indian Air Force
- Brigadier Surendra Singh Panwar (Retd.)
- Brigadier S. K. S. Negi (Retd.)
- Colonel Ajay Kothiyal (Retd.), Kirti Chakra and Shaurya Chakra recipient

=== Bureaucracy ===
- Ajit Doval, National Security Adviser of India, Kirti Chakra, President's Police Medal and Police Medal recipient
- Anil Dhasmana, former chief of the Research and Analysis Wing, the external intelligence agency of India

=== Judiciary ===
- Mukandi Lal (barrister, judge, politician, writer, and art critic from the Princely State of Tehri Garhwal)
- Sudhanshu Dhulia (Justice, Uttarakhand High Court. Judge In-Charge Education, Uttarakhand Judicial and Legal Academy)
- Ravindra Maithani (Judge at the High Court of Uttarakhand at Nainital since December 2018)

=== Politics ===
- Anil Baluni (journalist, politician, MP Rajya Sabha)
- Bhakt Darshan (politician, former Union Minister of State for Education and Transport, former MP Lok Sabha)
- Brahm Dutt (politician, former Union Minister of State for Petroleum and Natural Gas, former MP Lok Sabha)
- Dimple Rawat Yadav (politician, Samajwadi Party, wife of Akhilesh Yadav)
- Chandra Mohan Singh Negi (politician, former MP Lok Sabha)
- Dhan Singh Negi (politician, Former MLA of Tehri)
- Hemwati Nandan Bahuguna (politician, former Chief Minister of Uttar Pradesh)
- Kamalendumati Shah (former Queen of the Princely State of Tehri Garhwal, former MP Lok Sabha)
- Mahant Avaidyanath (politician, former Mahant of Gorakhnath Math, former MP Lok Sabha)
- Lt. Col. Manabendra Shah (politician, former King of the Princely State of Tehri Garhwal, former MP Lok Sabha)
- Manohar Kant Dhyani (politician, former MP Rajya Sabha)
- Manorama Dobriyal Sharma (politician, former MP Rajya Sabha)
- Paripoornanand Painuli (politician, former MP Lok Sabha)
- Ramesh Pokhriyal (politician, Union Minister of Human Resource Development, former Chief Minister of Uttarakhand)
- Rita Bahuguna Joshi (politician, MP Lok Sabha)
- Satpal Maharaj (politician, former MP Lok Sabha)
- Tirath Singh Rawat (politician, Chief Minister of Uttrakhand)
- Trepan Singh Negi (politician, former MP Lok Sabha)
- Trivendra Singh Rawat (politician, Former Chief Minister of Uttarakhand)
- Vijay Bahuguna (politician, former Chief Minister of Uttarakhand)
- Yogi Adityanath (politician, Mahant of Gorakhnath Math, Chief Minister of Uttar Pradesh, former MP Lok Sabha)

=== Business and industry ===
- P. L. Gairola, Indian banker, former chairman of Dena Bank
- O. P. Bhatt, Indian banker, 22nd Chairman of the State Bank of India

=== Sports ===
==== Mixed Martial Arts ====
- Anshul Jubli (Indian MMA fighter, currently fights in the UFC)

==== Mountaineering ====
- Arvind Raturi (Mountaineer, scaled Mount Everest as a part of the NCC Mount Everest Expedition Team in 2013)
- Major Harsh Vardhan Bahuguna (Mountaineer, Padma Shri recipient (posthumous))
- Major Jai Vardhan Bahuguna (Mountaineer, Shaurya Chakra recipient (posthumous))
- Mohan Singh Gunjyal (Indo Tibet Border Police) Summitted Mount Everest. Recipient of Tenzing Norgay National Adventure Award and Padma Shri.
- Kanhaya Lal Pokhriyal (Indian Police officer and mountaineer, summited Mount Everest, Padma Shri recipient)
- Major Narendra Dhar Jayal (Mountaineer, founding principal of the Himalayan Mountaineering Institute at Darjeeling)
- Bachendri Pal (first Indian woman to reach summit of Mt. Everest, Padma Bhushan)

==== Shooting ====
- Jaspal Rana (Commonwealth Games gold medalist in shooting, Padma Shri recipient)
- Sushma Rana (2006 Commonwealth Games at Melbourne)

==== Chess ====
- Parimarjan Negi (third-youngest chess grand-master in history, Arjuna Award 2010)

==== Cricket ====
- Amit Uniyal (Left-arm-fast-medium bowler, plays for Punjab cricket team, currently a part of Rajasthan Royals in the Indian Premier League)
- Aryan Juyal (Wicketkeeper-batsman, part of the India national under-19 cricket team who won the 2018 Under-19 Cricket World Cup)
- Hemlata Kala (Player for the India national women's cricket team)
- Pawan Suyal (First-class cricketer, Left-arm medium-pace bowler, plays for Delhi cricket team in domestic cricket, currently a part of Delhi Capitals in the Indian Premier League)
- Preeti Dimri (Player for India women's national cricket team)
- Rishabh Pant (Player for India national cricket team) Wikipedia

==== Football ====
- Deependra Negi (Indian professional football midfielder for Kerala Blasters in the Indian Super League)
- Manish Maithani (Indian precessional football midfielder for Pune City in the Indian Super League)
- Sahil Panwar (Indian professional football defender for Pune City in the Indian Super League)

=== Journalism and literature ===
- Viren Dangwal (Poet and recipient of the Sahitya Academy Award for his renowned contribution in Hindi Literature)
- Manglesh Dabral (poet and journalist, He was a recipient of the Sahitya Akademi Award in 2000)
- Shivprasad Dabral Charan (Historian, poet and writer (Hindi and Garhwali) from Uttarakhand)

== See also ==
- Garhwal division
- Garhwal Rifles
- Kumaoni people
