= Uniyal =

Indian surname

Uniyal is a Garhwali Gangari Brahmin surname mostly used in the Indian state of Uttarakhand.

== Notable people ==
- Amit Uniyal (born 1981), Indian cricketer
- Subodh Uniyal, Indian politician, member of Uttarakhand Legislative Assembly representing the Bharatiya Janata Party, cabinet minister in the Government of Uttarakhand.
- Sunil Uniyal, Indian politician from Uttarakhand representing the Bharatiya Janata Party, mayor of Dehradun since 2018.

== See also ==
- Bahuguna
- Naudiyal
- Naithani
- Sarola Brahmin
