= Hatwal =

Sub-caste of Garhwali brahmins

- Classification: Brahmin
- Religions: Hinduism
- Languages: Garhwali
- Country: India
- Populated states: Uttarakhand
- Related groups: • Garhwali people

Hatwal is one of the 36 sub-castes of Sarola Brahmins and their toponymic surname from Hat, a village in the Chamoli district of Uttarakhand, India.

== Origin ==
The Hatwals are one of the 36 sub-castes of Sarola Brahmins from Garhwal who first migrated to the hills of present-day Uttarakhand from the plains of north-western India around the 13th century.
