= Gairola =

Gairola is a clan of the Garhwali Sarola Brahmins and is also a toponymic surname from Gairoli, a village in the Chamoli district of Uttarakhand, India. In an earlier time period, Gairolas were believed to be astrologers and rajpurohits. (Note: There is a community of people in India called Rajpurohit, but the term is also synonymous with Rajguru as an ancient term for a type of Brahmin. Hermann Kulke and Dietmar Rothermund stated, "There is much evidence in ancient texts that there were two ideal types of Brahmins in those days, the royal priest or advisor (rajpurohit, rajguru) and the sage (rishi) who lived in the forest and shared his wisdom only with those who asked for it." Its modern use in this sense has been described by Sumit Sarkar as a "self-conscious archaism.")

Notable people with this surname include:

- P.L. Gairola, Indian banker
- Tara Dutt Gairola, Indian lawyer, author, and editor
