= Thapliyal =

Brahmin surname in Uttarakhand

Thapliyal is a Garhwali Sarola Brahmin toponymic surname from Thapli, a village in the Chamoli District of the Indian state of Uttarakhand. In around 980 CE, people of Thapliyal Sarola Gaur Brahmin caste settled in a village named Thapli in Chandpur. Their Kuladevi is Jwalpa Devi.

== Notable people ==
Notable people with this surname include:

- Abhilash Thapliyal, Indian film actor, radio jockey and TV host
- Gyaneshwar Prasad Thapliyal (born 1938), Indian Cricketer
