= Leeladhar Jagudi =

Indian journalist and poet (born 1940)

- Born: July 1, 1940 (age 86); Dhangan gaon, Tehri Garhwal district, Uttarakhand, India
- Occupations: Hindi Poet; Academic; Journalist
- Years active: Since 1964
- Known for: Hindi poems
- Awards: Padma Shri; Sahitya Akademi Award; Raghuvir Sahay Samman; Bharatiya Bhasha Parishad Shatadal Award; Namit Puraskar; Aakashvani Award
- Website: Official website

Leeladhar Jagudi is an Indian teacher, journalist and poet of Hindi literature. He is the author of several poetry anthologies including Natak Jari Hai and Shankha Mukhi Shikharon Par and is a recipient of the Sahitya Akademi Award, for his 1997 anthology, Anubhav Ke Aakash Mein Chand. The Government of India awarded him the fourth highest civilian honour of the Padma Shri, in 2004, for his contributions to Hindi literature.

== Biography ==
Jagudi was born on 1 July 1940 in a Garhwali family in Dhangan gaon, in the Tehri Garhwal district of the Indian state of Uttarakhand. After securing a master's degree (MA) in Hindi language and literature, he started his career by joining the Garhwal Rifles of the Indian Army. After retirement from the Army, he worked as a teacher in various schools and colleges before joining the Information and Public Relations Department of the Government of Uttar Pradesh, where he became the Deputy Director. Later, he turned to journalism and is the Chief Editor of Uttar Pradesh, a monthly magazine.

Jagudi has written several poems, published independently and as anthologies and his poems have been translated into English. His first anthology, Shankha Mukhi Shikharon Par, was published in 1964, followed by Natak Jari Hai, published in 1972. He published Is Yatra Mein in 1974 which preceded nine more anthologies, including Raat Ab Bhi Maujud Hai, Ghabaraye Hue Shabda, Bachi Hui Prithvi Par and award winning Anubhav Ke Aakash Mein Chand. He has also written two books on the topic of adult literacy and some of his interviews have been compiled as a book, Mere Sakshatkara, published by Kitab Ghar Prakashan in 2003. His works have been the subject of many studies, and two books, Samkalin Kavi Liladhar Jagudi aur Dhumil, written by Sharmila Saxena and published in 2008 and Samakalina Kavita aura Liladhara Jaguṛi, written by Brajamohan Sharma have been published on them.

Sahitya Akademi chose his Anubhav Ke Aakash Mein Chand for their annual award in 1997. The Government of India included him in the 2004 Republic Day Honours list for the civilian award of the Padma Shri. He is also a recipient of Raghuvir Sahay Samman, Shatadal Award of Bharat Bhasha Parishad, Namit Puraskar and Aakashvani Award. He lives in the city of Dehradun in the Dehradun district of Uttarakhand.

== Selected bibliography ==
- Leeladhar Jagudi (1974). Is Yatra Mein. Sahitya Bharati. ASIN B00CIGM6LU.
- Leeladhar Jagudi (1997). Anubhav Ke Aakash Mein Chand. Rajkamal Prakashan. p. 143. ISBN 9788126707287.
- Leeladhar Jagudi (2003). Mere sākshātkāra. Kitāb Ghar Prakasan. p. 168. ISBN 9788170165545.
- Leeladhar Jagudi (2009). Ghabaraye Hue Shabda. Rajkamal Prakashan. p. 82. ISBN 9788126717903.

== Awards ==
- Padma Shri in 2004
- Sahitya Akademi Award in 1997 for Anubhav Ke Aakash Mein Chand
- Raghuvir Sahay Samman
- Bharatiya Bhasha Parishad Shatadal Award
- Namit Puraskar
- Aakashvani Award
- Vyas Samman in 2018 for Jitne Log Utne Prem

== See also ==
- Garhwali people
