= Bahuguna =

Bahuguna is a Garhwali Gangari Brahmin sub-group found in the Indian state of Uttarakhand.

== See also ==
- Anthwal
- Uniyal
- Naudiyal
- Naithani
- Sarola Brahmin
