= Asad Zaidi =

Indian poet, editor, translator, and publisher (born 1954)

Asad Zaidi (born 31 August 1954) is an Indian poet, editor, translator, publisher, and literary critic. He has been a noted Hindi poet since the early 1980s.

== Biography and works ==
Zaidi was born in Karauli, Rajasthan. He first came to Delhi in 1974, where he has lived mostly ever since. From the mid-1970s to the mid-1980s, he attended the Jawaharlal Nehru University. Zaidi is married to the historian Nalini Taneja.

=== Reception of poetry ===
Zaidi's first collection of poems Behne aur Anya Kavitaein (1980) established him as 'a distinctive voice in contemporary Hindi poetry' early on. In 1981, Zaidi was awarded the Sanskriti Award in recognition of his contributions to Hindi literature. In 1993, Chaman Lal counted Zaidi among the third of the four generations of poets who were at that time actively composing in Hindi. Zaidi's poetic anthology Saman ki talash (2008) received much critical acclaim. Commenting on this book, Manglesh Dabral, noted poet and an old friend of Zaidi, wrote, "The rise of communal fascism in our politics and the communalization of the society is the main poetic concern of Asad Zaidi as a citizen. There are many unique poems on this decline of the society in this collection. For this, Asad sometimes comments on the politics of Hindi, sometimes evokes the memory of the fading classical-philosophical voice of a great singer like Amir Khan, and the language in which he does this is a new movement between Hindi-Urdu, an example of a new unity and a concerted effort to enrich our poetic language." In 2018, Aftab Hussain wrote of Zaidi in The News as 'a powerful exception' to the general absence of Muslims in the Hindi literature that came after the Partition of India in 1947. In 2022, Tarun Bhartiya wrote of Zaidi in Outlook magazine: "Asad Zaidi’s poetic voice has remained at an angular relationship to the Hindi (Hindu, Hindustan) literary world. Having written some of the landmark and prophetic Hindi poems of the last half a century, Zaidi continues to be a difficult poetic phenomenon for Hindi."

Besides in his own books, Zaidi's poems appear in edited anthologies including Sharma (2019) and Stewart (2020).

=== Other works ===
At Delhi, Zaidi runs the Three Essays Collective, an independent publishing house. There, he is also the editor of Jalsa, an annual literary anthology of new writings and translations in Hindi. Zaidi is proficient in Hindi, Urdu, and English. He has translated many works of European, Latin American, and Chinese poets from English into Hindi and Urdu. He has also translated works of Urdu poetry into Hindi, and of Hindi poetry into English. Besides, Zaidi is known as a literary critic.

== Selected bibliography ==
=== As author ===
- Behne aur Anya Kavitaein (1980, in Hindi)
- Kavita ka Jeevan (1988, in Hindi)
- Saman ki Talash: Kavitaein 1989-2007 (2008, in Hindi)
- Sare Shaam: Asad Zaidi ke Teen Kavita Sangreh (2014, in Hindi - a volume assimilating the three books above)

=== As editor ===
- Raghuveer Sahay (Vishnu Nagar and Asad Zaidi (eds.), 1994, in Hindi)
- Apni Zabaan: Sampradayikta Virodhi Kavitaon ka Sangreh (Vishnu Nagar and Asad Zaidi (eds.), 1994, in Hindi)
- Aaj ka Paath: Samkaaleen Hindi Kahani ka Ek Chayan (Asad Zaidi and Vishnu Nagar (eds.), 1994, in Hindi)
- Yah Aisa Samay Hai: Samkaaleen Hindi Kavita ka Ek Chayan (Asad Zaidi and Vishnu Nagar (eds.), 1994, in Hindi)
- Das Baras: Hindi Kavita Ayodhya ke Baad (Asad Zaidi (ed.), 2003, in Hindi)
