= Semwal =

Brahmin subcaste from Uttarakhand, India

- Classification: Brahmin
- Religions: Hinduism
- Languages: Garhwali
- Country: India
- Populated states: Uttarakhand
- Related groups: Garhwali people

Semwal is one of the thirty-six subcastes of Sarola Brahmin from Uttarakhand. They are the sole custodians and pandits of the Gangotri temple.

== Etymology ==
The name "Semwal" originates from a place called Sem-Mukhem (Hindi:सेम-मुखेम) in Uttarakhand, abode to the shrine of Sem-Mukhem Nagraj (Hindi: सेममुखेम नागराज) often considered among the locals as the fifth shrine of the Chota Char Dham pilgrimage of which the Semwals are permanent serving priests. Apart from this, the name "Semwal" might also have originated from Sem village in Karnaprayag, Chamoli district.
