= Jwalpa Devi =

Religion
- Affiliation: Hinduism
- Deity: Parvati (jwalpa Devi)
- Festival: Navaratri

Location
- Location: Patisain, Satpuli
- State: Uttarakhand Pauri Garhwal
- Country: India

Architecture
- Type: North Indian architecture

Jwalpa Devi Temple is a shrine dedicated to the goddess Jwalpa, a form of goddess Parvati. It's situated on the bank of Nawalika River, 34 km from Pauri on the main Pauri-Kotdwar road.

The Anthwal family are the traditional priests and caretakers of this temple, as the present temple was constructed by the late Pandit Shri Duttaram Anthwal (the Anthwals, originally from village Aneth, being the landlords of the area).

Jwalpa Devi is Kuladevi of Thapliyal and Bisht clan.

== Festivals ==
Every year two Navaratris are held, Chaitra and Shardiya ones. A fair is also held on Basant Panchami.

== Legend ==
According to Skandpurana, Shachi, the daughter of Daityaraj Pulom in Satyuga, had penned the austerity of Maa Parvati, the adhyaksh goddess of the Himalayas at Jwalpa Dham along the river Nayar to receive Indra as husband. Mother Parvati rejoices over Shachi's penance and fulfills her wish, appearing as Deept Jwaleswari, and the place was then named Jwalpa.

It is also said that Adi Shankaracharya visited and prayed in this temple, and the goddess appeared to him.
