= Chandra Singh Garhwali =

Indian soldier

Chandra Singh Bhandari "Veer Chandra Garhwali"
- Born: December 25, 1891; Meason, Garhwal Kingdom
- Died: October 1, 1979 (aged 87)
- Occupations: Politician, Freedom Fighter
- Political party: Communist Party of India
- Movement: Indian Independence Movement

Chandra Singh Bhandari (25 December 1891 – 1 October 1979) was an Indian soldier and later in life a member of the Communist Party. On 23 April 1930, Bhandari lead a troop of soldiers of the Royal Garhwal Rifles in a conscientious objection. Bhandari refused British orders to fire on unarmed Pathans fighting for India's independence in an incident that would later come to be known as the "Peshawar Kaand". He lived with Mahatma Gandhi in Sabarmati Ashram for a short time.

== Early life and military service ==
Bhandari was born in Meason, Patti Chauthan in district Pauri.

On September 3, 1914, during the First World War, Chandra Singh enlisted into the army at Lansdowne. On August 1, 1915, Chandra Singh, along with other Garhwali soldiers, was sent to France by the British. He returned to Lansdowne on February 1, 1916. During the First World War, Chandra Singh participated in the Battle of Baghdad in 1917.

After the First World War ended, the British began dismissing many soldiers, reducing the ranks of those who had been promoted during the war. Chandra Singh was among them. He was demoted from a Havildar to a Sepoy. Consequently, he considered leaving the army. However, senior officers convinced him that his promotion would be taken care of and granted him some time off. During this time, Chandra Singh came into contact with Mahatma Gandhi.

Garhwali also introduced Sri Dev Suman to Gandhi in Wardha. After his conversation with Gandhi Suman asked Garhwali what his dream for the people of Garhwal was. On this, Chandra Singh Garhwali narrated his dream to Shridev Suman and said, 'I imagine an independent Garhwal in independent India. Garhwali shared his dream of an independent Garhwal no longer politically and socially divided by the Ganges." He also emphasized a future with a classless and post-untouchability society with no capitalists and no landlords.

After some time, he was sent to Waziristan with his battalion in 1920, after which he was promoted again. After returning from there, he spent much time with Arya Samaj workers, and a sense of patriotism developed within him. However, the British did not approve of this and sent him to the Khyber Pass. By this time, Chandra Singh had attained the rank of Major Havildar.

== Peshawar Incident ==
On 20th April, 1930 Khan Abdul Ghaffar Khan organized a civil disobedience movement in the North-West frontier and a Satyagrah was planned for 23rd April 1930 in Peshawar. Two platoons of the Garhwal Rifles regiment under Garhwali were deployed along with others. Garhwali refused to fire on the protestors. These soldiers tried for disobeying the British were represented by Barrister Mukundi Lal, who, after tireless efforts, had their death sentences commuted to life imprisonment. Chandra Singh Garhwali's entire property was confiscated, and his uniform was torn from his body.

== Later life ==
In 1930, Chandra Singh Garhwali was sent to Abbottabad jail (now in Pakistan) for 14 years of imprisonment. His sentence was reduced and after 11 years of imprisonment, he was released on 26 September 1941. But his entry to Garhwal was restricted due to which he had to keep wandering here and there and finally he went to Wardha to meet Gandhi, who was deeply impressed by him. In the Quit India Movement of 8 August 1942, he stayed in Allahabad and took active part in this movement and was again arrested for three years. He was released in 1945.

On December 22, 1946, Chandra Singh was able to re-enter Garhwal with the support of the Communists. In 1957, he contested the elections as a candidate of the Communist Party of India but was unsuccessful. Chandra Singh Garhwali died on October 1, 1979, after a prolonged illness.

== Honors ==
In 1994, the Government of India issued a postage stamp in his honor. Several roads were also named after him.

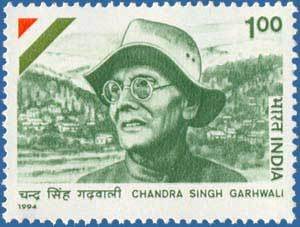
Chandra Singh Garhwali at 1994 Stamp of India.

- In 23 April 1994, India Post honored him by issuing stamp on him.
- Government medical college Veer Chandra Singh Garhwali Government Institute of Medical Science and Research is named after him.
- Agricultural university Veer Chandra Singh Garhwali Uttarakhand University of Horticulture and Forestry is named after him.
- In 2022, Former Union Minister of Education and Chief Minister of Uttarakhand Ramesh Pokhriyal "Nishank" wrote biography on him which was published by National Book Trust.
- In 2021, his statue was unveiled by Defence Minister of India, Rajnath Singh.
- In 2014, Kishore Upadhyaya demanded to Harish Rawat for installation of his statue in Dehradun.
- A scheme in Uttarakhand "Veer Chandra Singh Garhwali Tourism Self Employment Scheme" is named after him.
- A school has been built in his name in the Saket area of Delhi.
