= Barthwal =

Barthwal is an Indian (Sarola Brahmin) toponymic surname from Bareth, a village in the Pauri Garhwal district, Uttarakhand, India.

Notable people with the surname include:

- Vijaya Barthwal (born 1952), Indian politician
- Madhuri Barthwal, Indian folk singer
