= Koteshwar Mahadev =

Hindu Temple in Uttarakhand

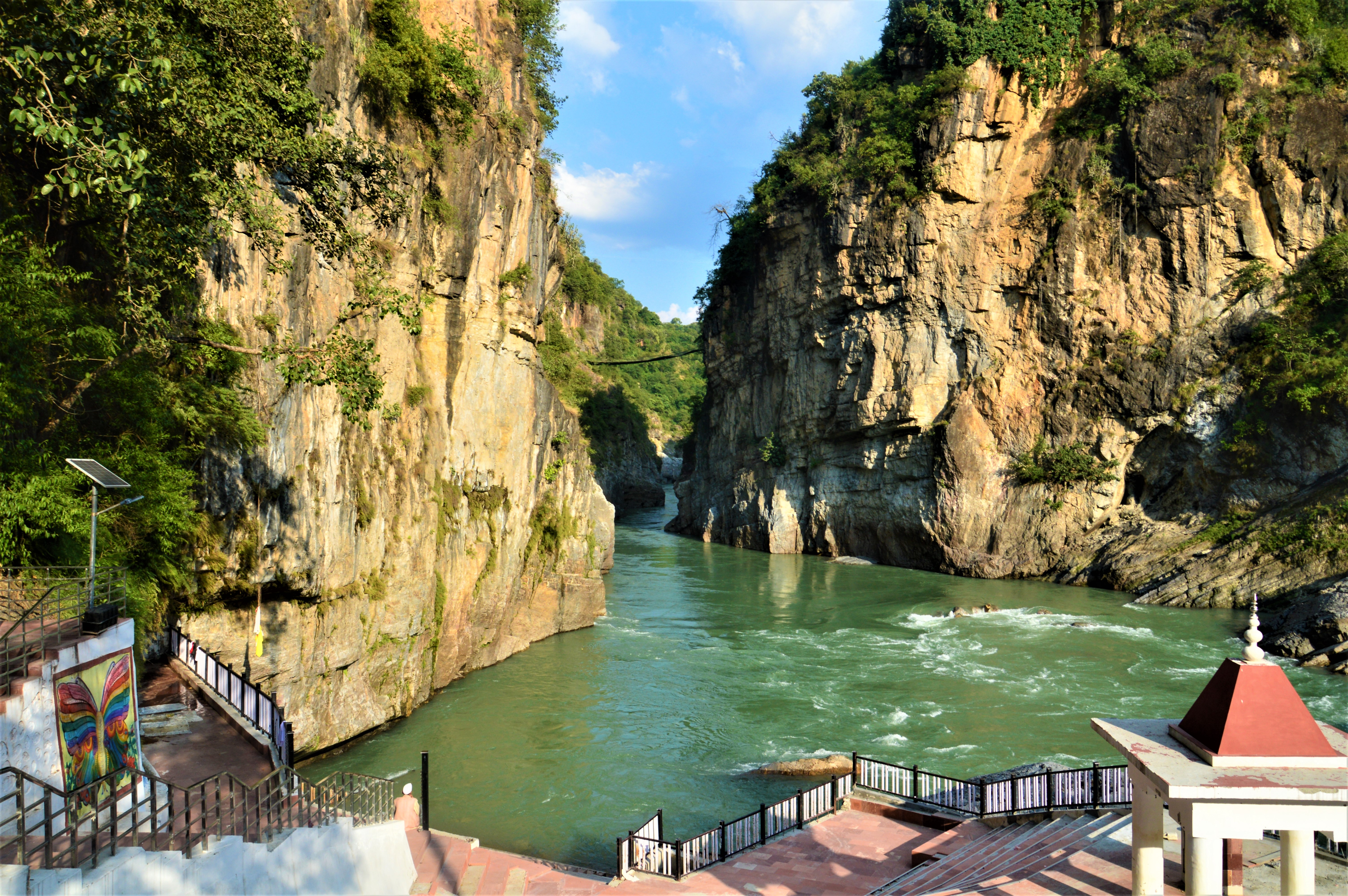
- River Alaknanda flowing beside Koteshwar Mahadev Temple in Rudraprayag district of Uttarakhand

- Location in Uttarakhand

Religion
- Affiliation: Hinduism
- District: Rudraprayag
- Deity: Shiva
- Festival: Mahashivratri

Location
- Location: Koteshwar
- State: Uttarakhand
- Country: India
- Interactive map of Koteshwar Mahadev
- Coordinates: 30.28°N 78.98°E

Architecture
- Type: Cave (artificial)
- Creator: Unknown
- Completed: Unknown
- Elevation: 885 m (2,904 ft)

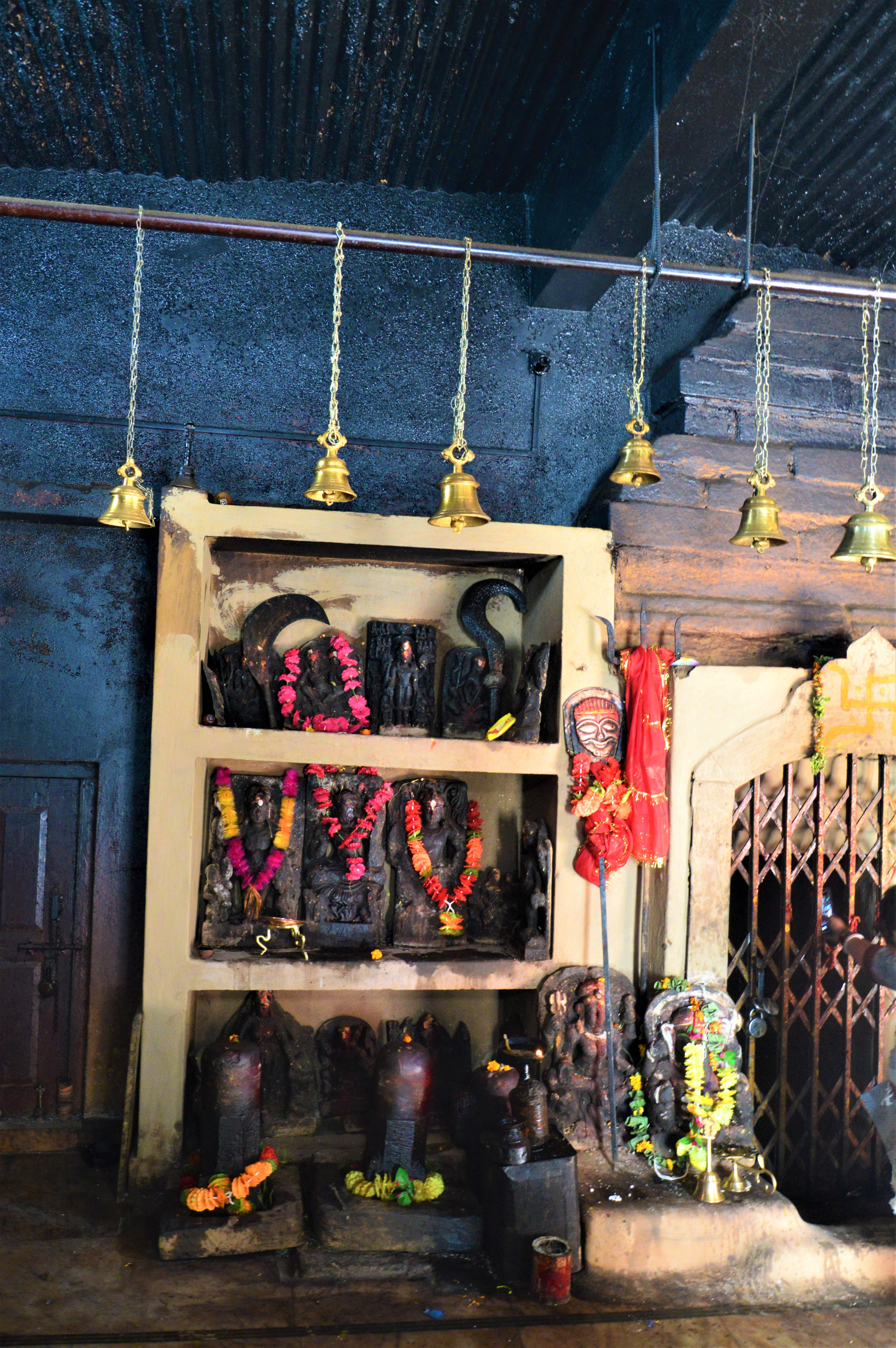
Idols of Koteshwar Mahadev Temple

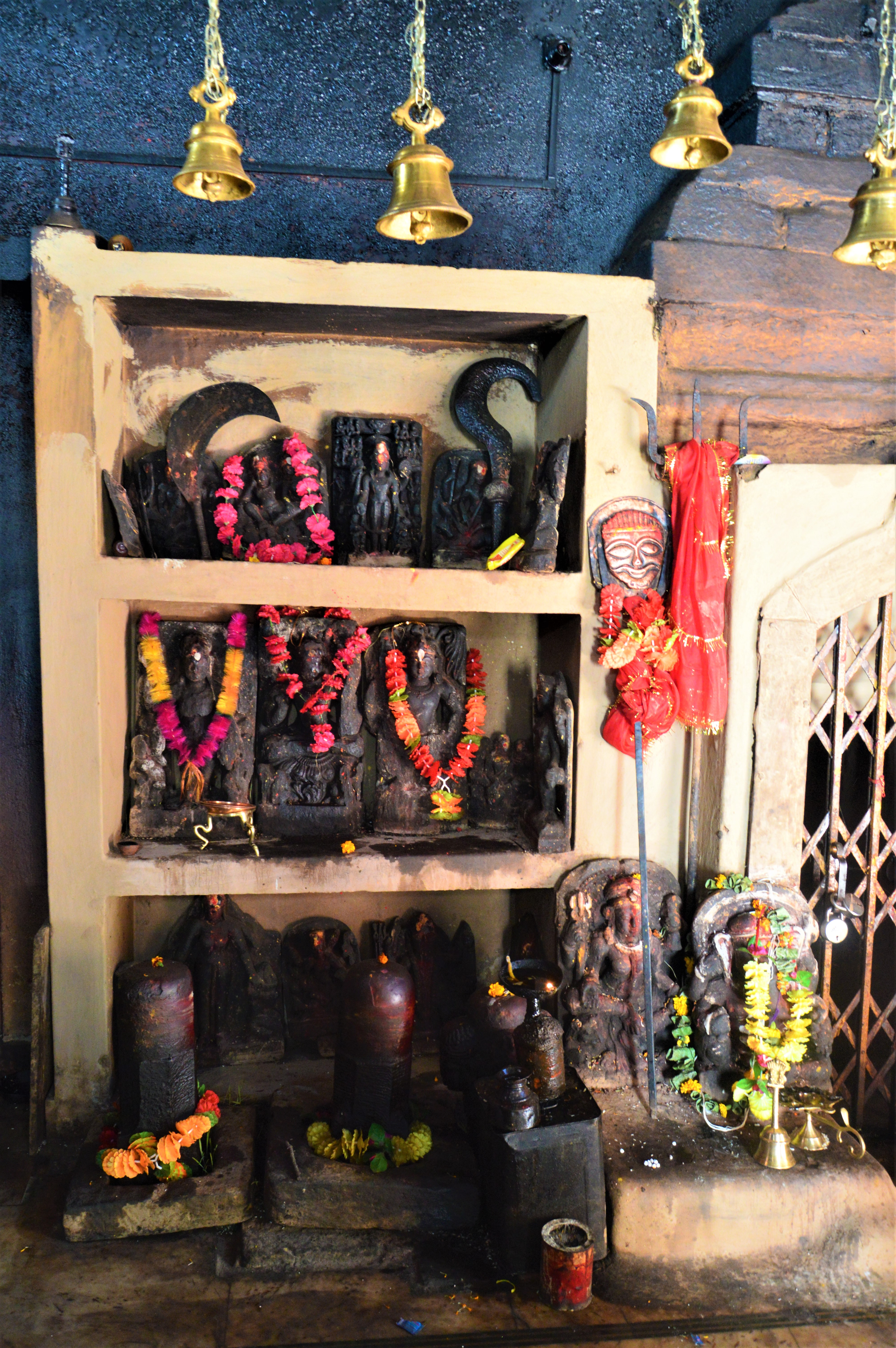
Idols of Koteshwar Mahadev Temple

Koteshwar Mahadev Temple (Devanagari: कोटेश्वर महादेव) is a Hindu temple dedicated to lord Shiva, and is located approximately 3 kilometres (3,000 m) from the centre of the Rudraprayag district of Uttarakhand, a little above the Alaknanda River.

== Legends ==
The location is believed to be the spot where Lord Shiva stopped to meditate on his way to Kedarnath. According to local mythology the temple has existed since the time of Bhasmasura.

This demon was said to turn to ashes anyone whose head he touched. Lord Shiva went into hiding to escape the threat, resting in various places before coming to the cave at Koteshwar Mahadev. Shiva rested here for some time before confronting and defeating the demon. A similar legend is associated with Shrikhand Mahadev and Kinner Kailash in Himachal Pradesh.

== Hospital ==
A modern 60-bed hospital is attached to the temple and serves the local community. This hospital is managed by the Jyotishpeethadheeshwar Jagatguru Shankracharya Swamy Madhavashram Charitable Trust.
