= Ruchi Badola =

Social Research Scientist

- Born: India
- Citizenship: Indian
- Education: Hemwati Nandan Bahuguna Garhwal University
- Scientific career
- Fields: Conservation biology; Biodiversity; Ecosystem services
- Workplaces: Wildlife Institute of India

Ruchi Badola is an Indian-born professor and scientist at the Wildlife Institute of India, Dehradun in the Department of Eco-development Planning and Participatory Management. She has conducted research in the field of community based conservation; sustainable biodiversity; Sustainable tourism, and ecosystem services.

== Education ==
She obtained her master’s from Garhwal University and joined the Wildlife Institute of India in 1988 as a research scholar and pursued her PhD on Economic Assessment of People Forest Interactions in the Elephant Forest Corridor Linking the Rajaji and Corbett National Park.

== Contribution to research ==
She leads the “Pravasi Ganga Prahari” programme which is a platform for citizens of Indian origin, and others residing across the globe to contribute towards Ganga Cleanliness and rejuvenation under National Mission for Clean Ganga vision. Other conservation programme, she has made critical contributions are "Biodiversity Conservation and Ganga Rejuvenation" project to aquatic life in the Ganga,; ENVIS Centre on Wildlife & Protected Areas; World Commission on Protected Areas and REDD+ in India.

She has published widely in peer reviewed journals and has authored chapters in seven books. Most recently, she was of the lead author in International Center for Integrated Mountain Development (ICIMOD) assessment report on Hindu Kush Himalayas, and has contributed chapter on "Sustaining Biodiversity and Ecosystem Services in the Hindu Kush Himalaya."
