= Mola Ram =

Indian painter (1743–1833)

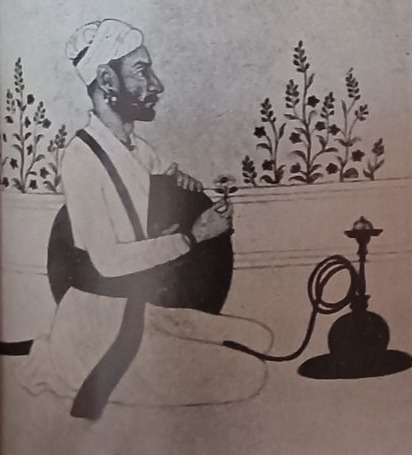
Self-portrait of the artist Mola Ram, Garhwal, ca.1743–1833

Mola Ram or Maula Ram (1743–1833) was an Indian painter, who originated the Garhwal School of Miniature Painting. He was also a poet, historian and diplomat. Mukandi Lal remained the leading authority on the subject till his death and also possesses a substantial private collection of many miniature paintings that were part of the school.

== Life ==
Mola Ram was born in Srinagar (now in Uttarakhand) to Mangat Ram and Rami Devi and worked for the Garhwal Kingdom from 1777 until its annexation first by the Gorkhas in 1803 followed by the British Raj in 1815.

Local historial sources narrate that two miniature painters of the Mughal imperial court at Delhi, Sham Das and his son Har Das (or Kehar Das), accompanied Sulaiman Shikoh, the son of Dara Shikoh, when he escaped from his uncle Aurangzeb in 1658 and sought refuge from Prithvi Shah of the Garhwal Kingdom, which had its capital in Srinagar.

The painters remained in Srinagar as the royal tasbirdar (picture-makers), on the King's request to Prince Sulaiman Shikoh. They taught the King Persian and customs within the courts of Delhi. The two painters painted in the Moughal Style of Miniature Painting And continued to do so with little change in their styles.

Their descendants continued to train successive generations and followed their styles with little improvement in the development of a new style. Mola Ram, one of their descendants, is largely credited with creating the Garhwal School of Painting. His son Jwala Ram and grandson Atma Ram continued the tradition, but further descendants suspected a curse and gave up painting. However, one of his descendants, Tulsi (often confused with Tulsi Mistri, another contemporary painter) also became a painter.

== Career ==
Mola Ram worked during the times of Garhwal rulers Pradip Shah, Lalit Shah, Jayakrit Shah and Pradyumna Shah from 1777 to 1804. He continued to work for the development of art and literature during the period of the Gorkha rule (1803–15) and the British rule over Garhwal.

Mola Ram himself initially painted in the Mughal style until visiting Kangra, e.g. his painting Mastani is in the Mughal idiom, while his later paintings, e.g. Vasakasajja Nayika, are in the Garhwal style, and can be called Garhwali Paintings in true sense. Some of his paintings are signed. Though Mola Ram has cast doubt on the authenticity of this claim.

He wrote the historical work Garhrajvansh Ka Itihas (History of the Garhwal royal dynasty) which is the source of information about several Garhwal rulers. He starts with Shyam Shah and goes on to describe Dularam Shah, Mahipati Shah, Pritam Shah, Medini Shah, Lalit Shah, and Jayakrit Shah. He also wrote Ganika Natak or Garh Gita Sangram in 1800. Mola Ram himself played a part in politics, helping Jayakrit Shah obtain help from Raja Jagat Prakash of Sirmur to quell a rebellion at the battle of Karparoli.

Mola Ram wrote Garhrajvanshkavya, Ran Bahadur Chandrika, Shamsher-e-Jang Chandrika, Bakhtawar Yash Chandrika and others. When Kaji Bakhtawar Singh Basnyat reached Srinagar on 1867 V.S. (i.e. 1810 A.D.), Mola Ram described the Gorkhali administration since 1861 V.S. (i.e. 1804 A.D.). In appreciation of Mola Ram's works, Kaji Bakhtawar gave 61 gold sovereigns, a horse, a robe, some weapons and restored his jagir villages and daily allowances. Mola Ram dedicated Bakhtawar Yash Chandrika in praises of Kaji Bakhtawar Singh Basnyat. He also wrote about the past, present, and future of the Gorkhali administration in Kumaon and Garhwal, which had predicted the possible collapse of Gorkhali rule as mentioned in his another work Garhrajvanshkavya.

Mola Ram died in Srinagar in 1833.

== Legacy ==
A large collection of Mola Ram's paintings are preserved at the Hemwati Nandan Bahuguna Garhwal University Museum in Srinagar, Uttarakhand. Some of his paintings can also be viewed at the Boston Museum, USA, at the Bharat Kala Bhawan in Varanasi, and at the Kastur Bhai Lal Bhai Sagrahaalaya, Ahmedabad.

Mukandi Lal wrote the book 'Garhwal Paintings' published by the Publications Division of the Government of India in 1968 which traced the history of Garhwal school of painting showcasing Mola Ram's various paintings and sketches.

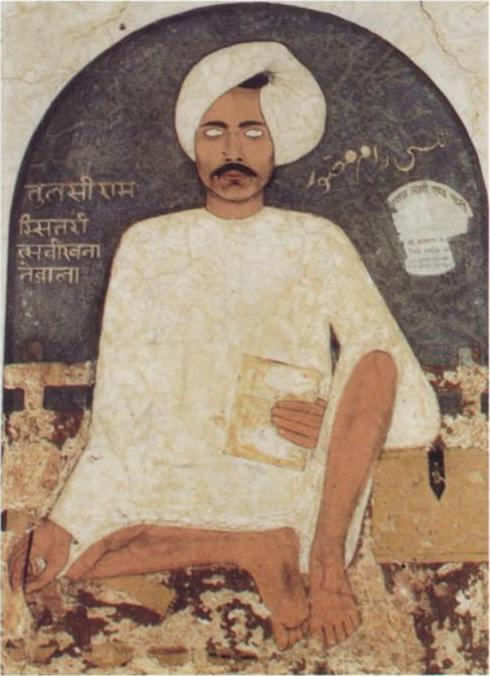
Mural of painter Tulsi Ram, great-grandson of Maula Ram, who painted many murals of the Guru Ram Rai Darbar Sahib complex at Dehradun.

Maula Ram's great-grandson, Tulsi Ram (also known as Phattu Sah), was responsible for painting most of the murals found on the walls of the Jhanda Darwaza of the Ram Rai Darbar in Dehradun.

== Gallery ==
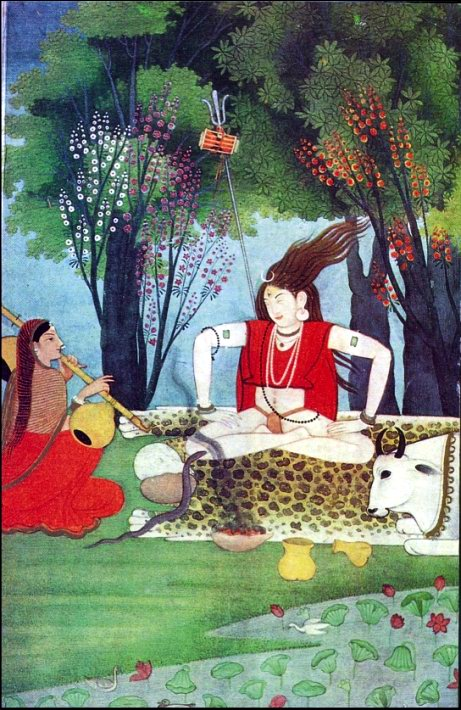
Shiva painted by Ram in the style of the Garhwal School, c. 1800

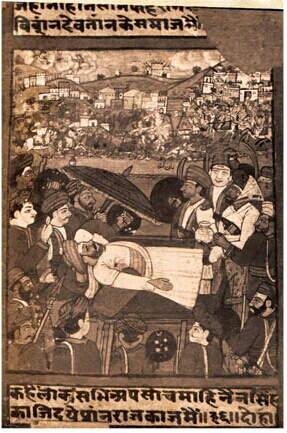
Poem and portrait of event of death of Kaji Nain Singh Thapa in 1804–06 Gorkha conquest of Garhwal, by Poet Mola Ram

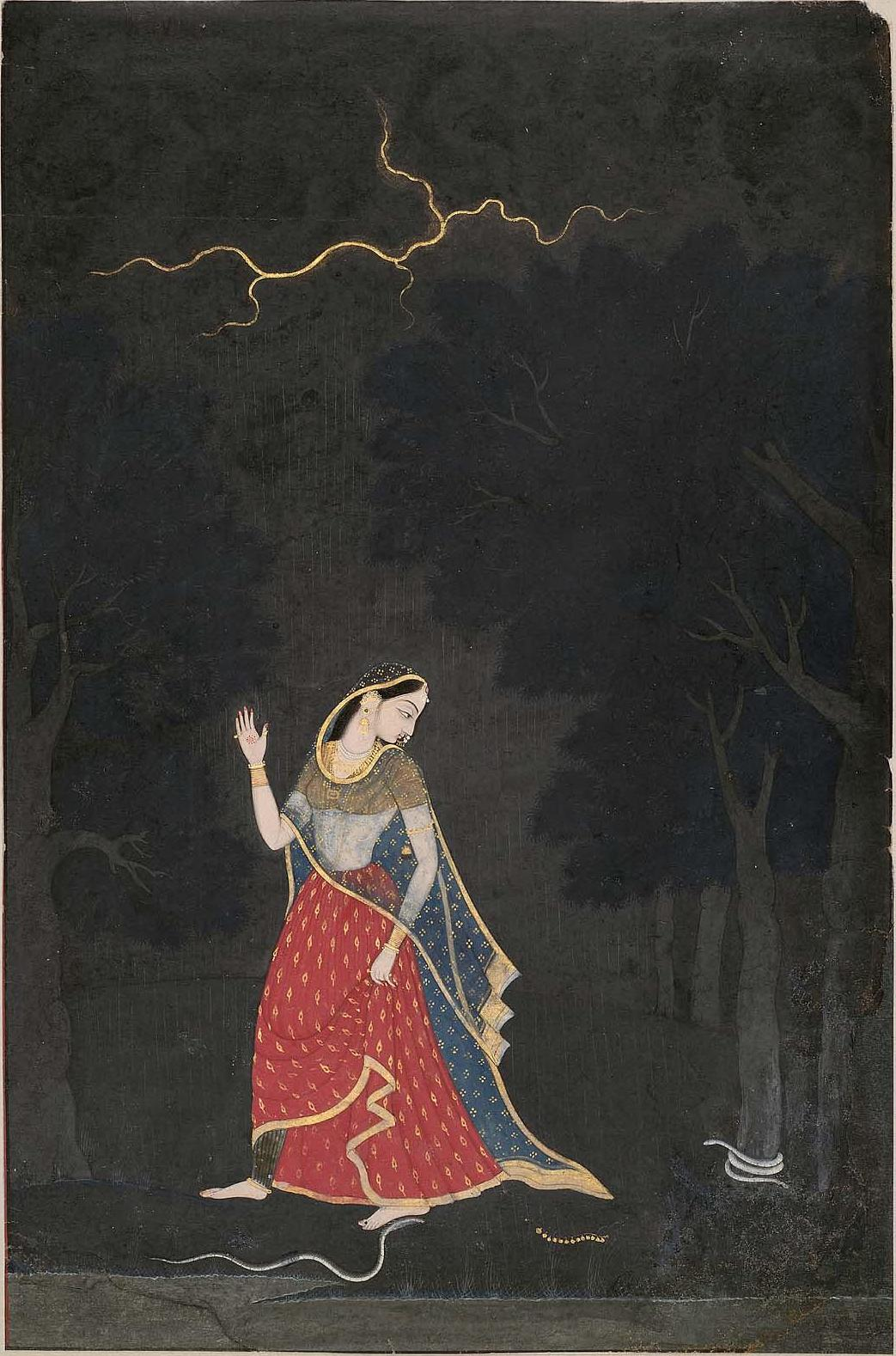
Abhisarika Nayika, a painting by Mola Ram

== Bibliography ==
- Hāṇḍā, Omacanda (2002), History of Uttaranchal, Indus Publishing, ISBN 978-81-7387-134-4
- Hāṇḍā, Omacanda; Jain, Dr. Madhu (2003), Art & architecture of Uttaranchal, Bhavana Books & Prints, ISBN 978-81-86505-65-6
- Kamboj, B. P. (2003), Early wall painting of Garhwal, Indus Publishing, ISBN 978-81-7387-139-9
- Chaitanya, Krishna (1982), A History of Indian Painting: Pahari Traditions, Abhinav Publications
- Rawat, Ajay S. (2002), Garhwal Himalayas: A Study in Historical Perspective, Indus Publishing, ISBN 978-81-7387-136-8
- Coomaraswamy, Ananda K. (1969), Introduction to Indian Art (2 ed.), Munshiram Manoharlal, Delhi
- Regmi, Mahesh Chandra (1987), Regmi Research Series, vol. 19, Regmi Research Centre
