= Viren Dangwal =

Indian poet and academic (1947–2015)

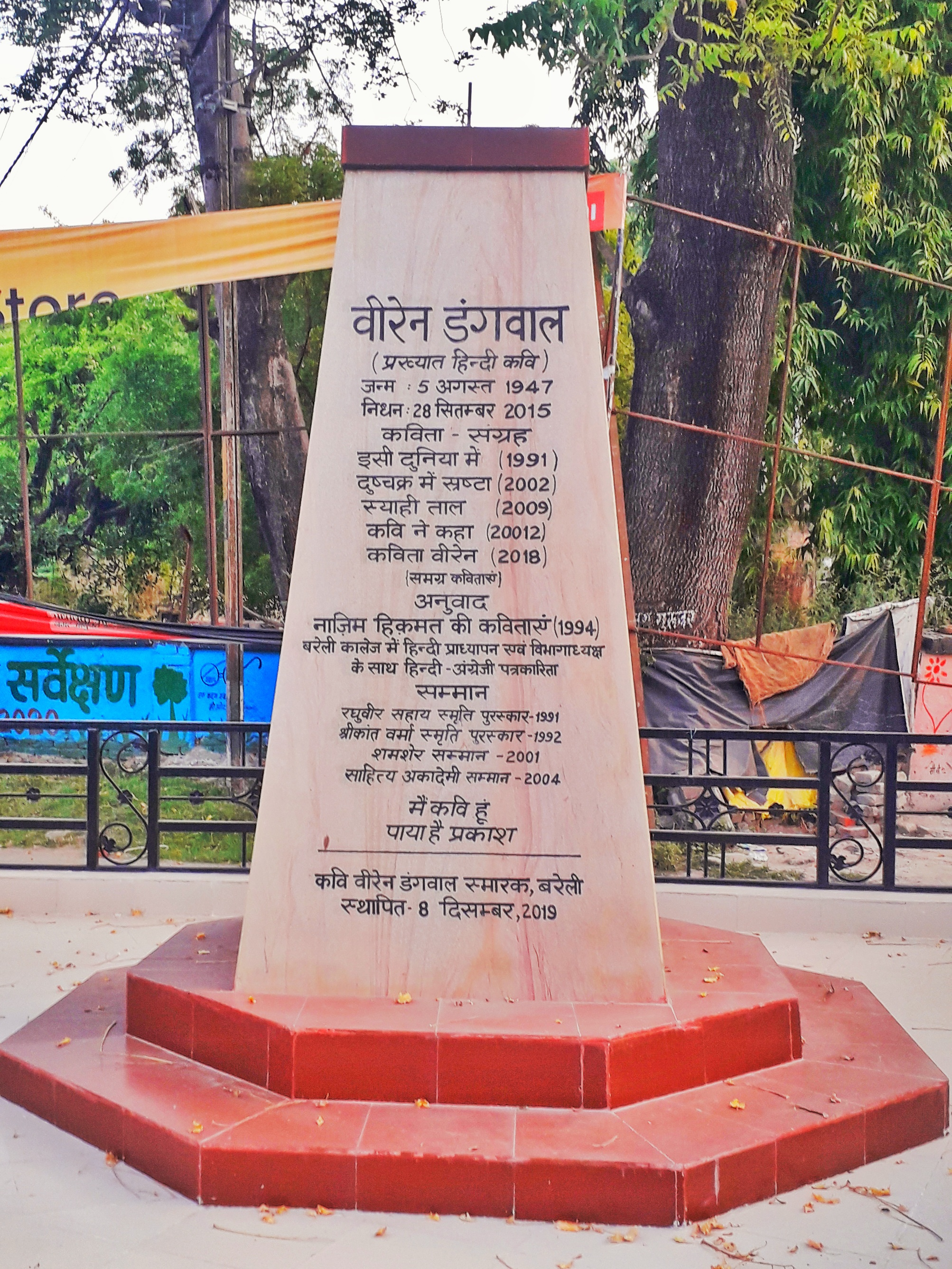
Memorial dedicated to Viren Dangwal at Civil Lines, Bareilly

Viren Dangwal (5 August 1947 – 28 September 2015) was an Indian poet, academic, and journalist. He received several awards for his poetry.

Viren Dangwal was born in 1947 in Kirti Nagar, Tehri Garhwal, Uttarakhand.

Viren Dangwal was associated with the editorial board of the Hindi language newspaper Amar Ujala. He served as a professor of Hindi at Bareilly College from 1974 to 2011.

In 1992 Dangwal received the Raghuveer Sahay Smriti Award for his poem 'Duniya'. In 1993 he received the Srikant Verma Smriti Award. In 2002, he received the Shamsher Samman award. In 2004, Dangwal received the Sahitya Akademi Award for his book of poetry, Dushchakra Mein Srista.

Dangwal's most famous poem was 'Kavi Ne kaha' .

Dangwal died in Bareilly in September 2015
