= Nautiyal =

Nautiyal is a Sarola Brahmin toponymic surname from Nauti, a village in the Chamoli district of the Indian state of Uttarakhand.

Notable persons with this surname include:

- Anil Nautiyal, Indian politician
- Asha Nautiyal (born 1969), Indian politician
- Jubin Nautiyal (born 1989), Indian musician
- Ram Prasad Nautiyal (1905–1980), Indian politician
- Vidyasagar Nautiyal (1933–2012), Indian politician
