= Raghuvir Sahay =

Indian writer (1929–1990)

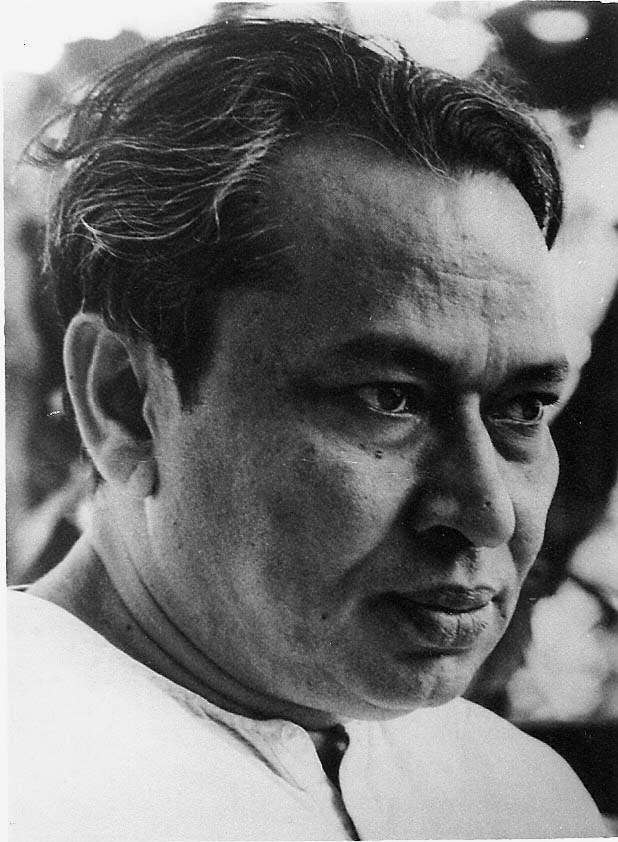
- Born: 9 December 1929; Lucknow, United Provinces, British India
- Died: 30 December 1990 (aged 61); Delhi, India
- Occupations: Writer, poet, translator, journalist
- Spouse: Bimleshwari Sahay
- Writing career
- Notable awards: 1984 : Sahitya Akademi Award

Raghuvir Sahay (9 December 1929 – 30 December 1990) was an Indian Hindi poet, short-story writer, essayist, literary critic, translator, and journalist. He remained the chief-editor of the political-social Hindi weekly, Dinmaan, 1969–82. He obtained a Master of Arts in English literature from the University of Lucknow in 1951.

== Awards ==
He was awarded the 1984 Sahitya Akademi Award in Hindi for his poetry collection, Log Bhool Gaye Hain (लोग भूल गये हैं) (They Have Forgotten, 1982).

== Bibliography ==
- Sanchayita Raghuvir Sahay (Selected Works), comp. Krishna Kumar.
- Kuch pate kuch chitthiyan (कुछ पते कुछ चिट्ठियाँ)
- Log Bhool Gaye Hain (लोग भूल गये हैं)
- Atmahatya Ke Viruddh (आत्महत्या के विरुद्ध)
- Hanso Hanso Jaldi Hanso (हँसो हँसो जल्दी हँसो)
- Seedhiyon Par Dhoop Hein (सीढ़ियों पर धूप में)
