= S. K. S. Negi =

Brigadier S. K. S. Negi (born 1949) is a retired Indian Army officer. He was commissioned into the Indian Army from the Indian Military Academy, Dehradun, in June 1970. He served with distinction in the Brigade of the Guards for 22 years before stepping into the higher echelons of the army. He is a graduate from Agra University and the Defense Services Staff College and a post graduate from Madras University. He has also taken diploma courses in management and computers. He held senior command, staff and instructional appointments at formation level and at Army Headquarters. He was an instructor at Army Training Institutes for seven years, the last being as the brigadier in charge of training at Indian Military Academy.

Post-retirement, he has been director of Indore Institute of Science and Technology at Indore for over two years overseeing the establishment and conduct of MBA, MCA, BE and B.Pharma courses.

As of May 2014 he had been the registrar of Jaypee University of Engineering and Technology, Raghogarh, for the previous 10 years.
