= Nagendra Saklani =

Nagendra Saklani (1920-1948) was a Communist Party of India leader who sacrificed his life while trying to defend the liberated Kirt Nagar division of the princely state of Tehri Garhwal from the retake bid by the royal forces of Tehri State on 11 January 1948.

== Early life ==
Nagendra Saklani was born on 16 November 1920 in the village of Pujar Gaon in Saklana Patti of the princely state of Tehri Garhwal. He studied in Dehradun up to class X. During his school days he came in contact with the Praja Mandal activities in the erstwhile princely state of Tehri and joined the organization to actively participate in the freedom movement.

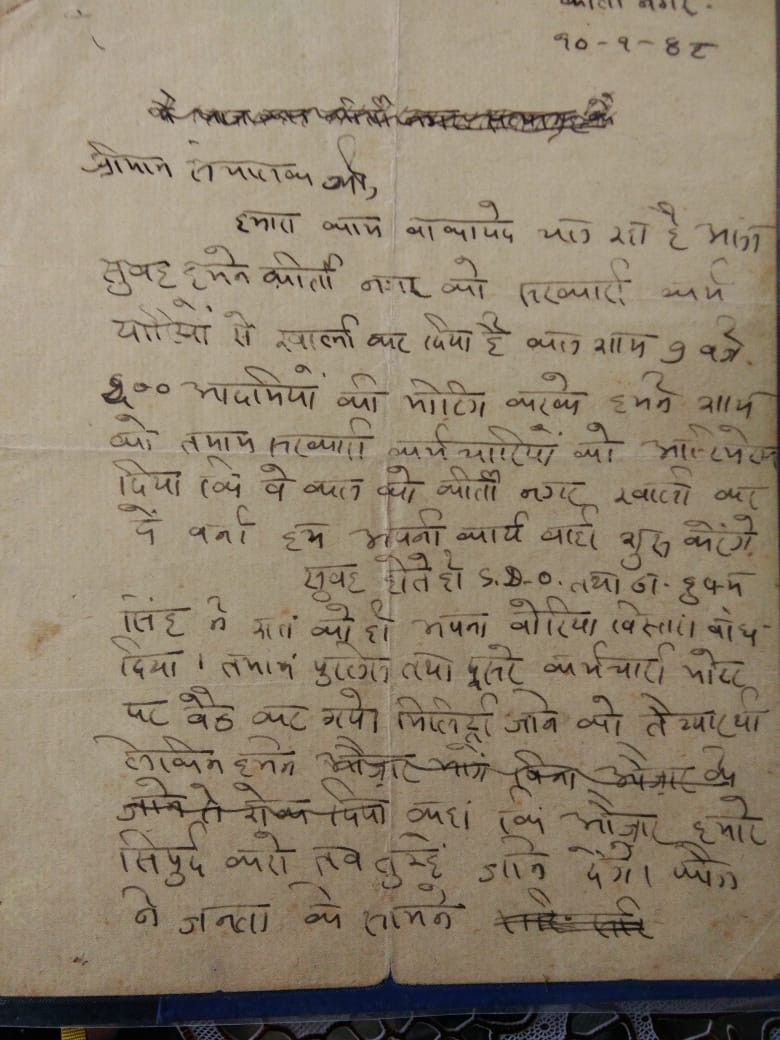
Last letter of Nagendra Saklani from Kirti Nagar a day before his death. Sachhidanand Painuli collection

== Political activism ==
Saklani was actively involved in organizing the activities of Praja Mandal, an offshoot of the Congress that worked exclusively in the princely states of India during the British occupation. Gradually he shifted his allegiance to the communist ideology. He was amongst the first batch of students of Anand Swaroop Bhardwaj, a young Marxist from Allahabad, sent to Dehradun to formally establish the communist party in the Garhwal region. Together with Brijendra Gupta, Nagendra Saklani started actively supporting the peasants' movement within the princely state of Tehri. He was actively involved in the Kadakot (Dangchoura) peasants uprising by providing assistance to the peasant leader Dada Daulat Ram. His activities infuriated a faction of Praja Mandal leaders who were interested in following a liberal approach in dealing with the King of the princely state of Tehri. Consequently, he was expelled from the Praja Mandal Party. However few young activists like Bhudev Lakhera, Trepan Singh Negi and Inder Singh Rana continued to collaborate with Nagendra Saklani in assisting the peasants' movement. Nagendra Saklani also worked in the British Garhwal region. He was amongst the core team members that assisted Chandra Singh Garhwali during his Pauri election campaign of 1946.

=== Saklana Dhandhak ===
On 15 August 1947, India became an independent country, however, rule of the king in the princely state of Tehri still continued. The villagers of the Saklana revolted against the new taxes imposed by the Jageerdar of Saklana, a small state within the princely state of Tehri. On 13 September 1947, the King sent an army contingent to Saklana to enforce new taxes and collect penalties from the villages. Collective fines of more than 13000 rupees were imposed on the villages. The army contingent sent under the command of Markanday Thapliyal started confiscating the properties of the villagers. Most of the villagers fled to village Kyara bordering the district of Dehradun in independent India. Nagendra Saklani assisted in establishing the refugee camp at Kyara. He organized the villagers who eventually went back to fight with the forces of Tehri state. In a surprise move, the villagers fought back and arrested the police party at Manjhgoan Akhodi in Saklana. The police party was escorted to the boundary of Saklana in a big procession and sent back to Tehri. A few days later the Muaafidar (landlord) of Sakalana Patti cancelled all its treaties with the princely state and announced the merger of Saklana with the union of India.

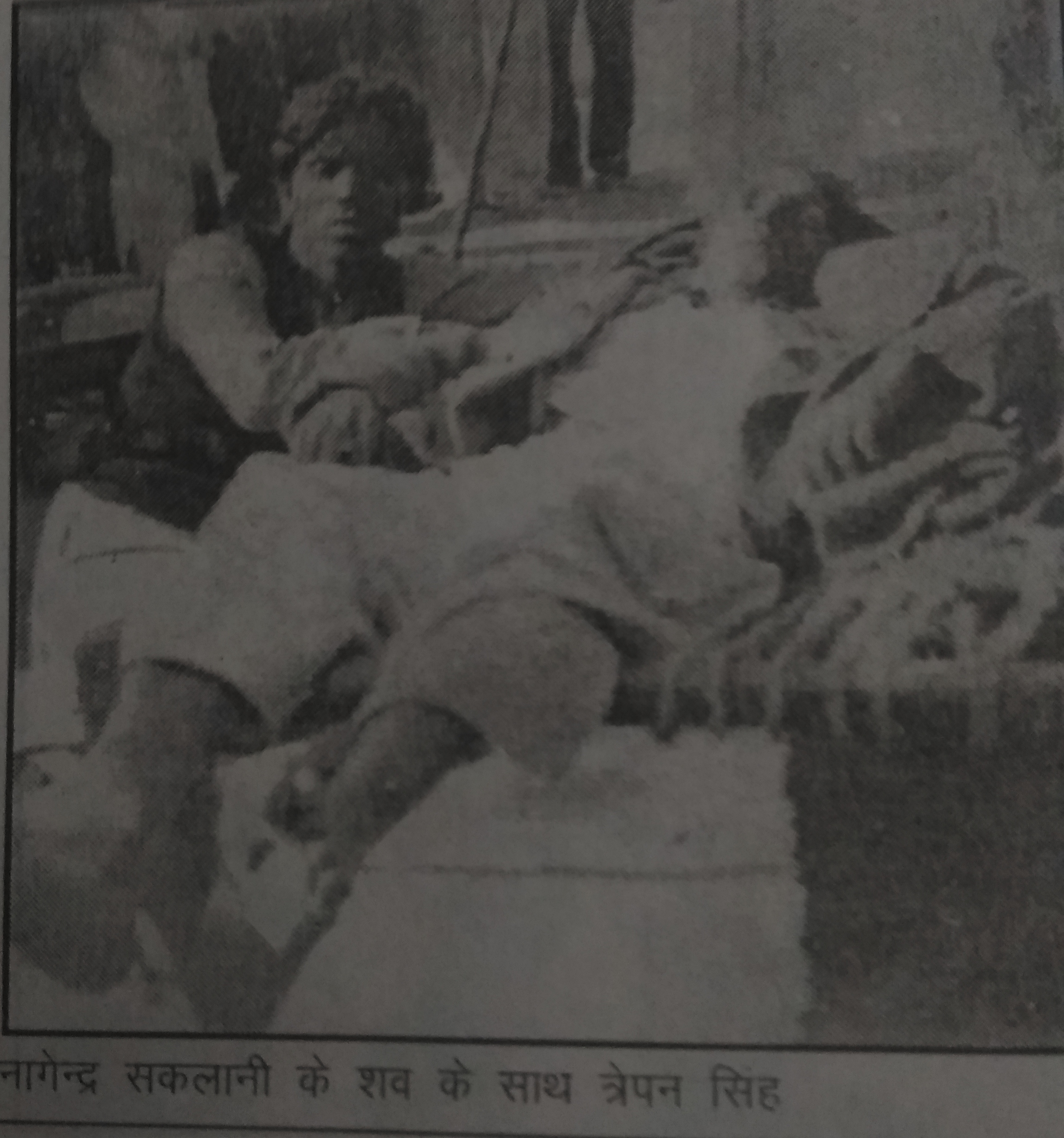
Trepan Singh Negi with funeral Bier of Nagendra Saklani

=== Kirti Nagar incident ===
In his last letter dated 10 January 1948, Nagendra Saklani wrote that ‘ yesterday we organized a meeting of 600 volunteers at Kirti Nagar and gave an ultimatum to the Sub Divisional Magistrate to vacate the place, which they obliged. The police and army also surrendered and left in motors for Narendranagar. Kirti Nagar is free from the Tehri state and is now part of India. People from adjoining villages are now marching towards Kirti Nagar to join the mission. We have appointed Raghunandan Pratap Dangwal (M.A., L. L. B.) as the new S.D.O. of Kirti Nagar under President Daulat Ram. A brave peasant Manju Singh Kandari has been appointed as the new inspector of police. Tomorrow early, we are planning to march towards Tehri and the plan is to take Tehri by 15 January’. However next day, that is on 11 January 1948, a contingent of royal army under the command of Jagdish Dobhal arrived from Narendra Nagar with orders to forcibly retake the Kirti Nagar court and other buildings. During the violent confrontation Dobhal shot Molu Ram Bhardari and fled from the scene. The mob chased the killer and other officers and ranks. Nagendra Saklani was leading the chase and he managed to catch Dobhal before he could enter the nearby forest. Nagendra Saklani was shot dead by Jagdish Dobhal in point-blank range as he grabbed his legs.

=== Funeral procession ===
Following the violence, all the state officers were arrested by the mob including SDO Jagdish Dobhal. They were locked in a court room with volunteers as guards as the angry crowd wanted an instant justice. Trepan Singh Negi a Praja Mandal activist, Devi Dutt Tiwari a communist leader, Dada Daulat Ram, a peasant leader and Triloki Nath Purvar a congress volunteer played an important role in controlling the crowd. Arrangements were made for the cremation of the martyrs next morning. However arrival of an agitated Chandra Singh Garhwali early next morning turned the entire sequence of events. Chandra Singh Garhwali suggested taking the bodies of the martyrs to Tehri. Everyone agreed and they immediately started their march towards Tehri. It took three days to reach Tehri, the capital of the princely state of Tehri. Thousands of villagers joined the funeral procession. The police post along the route surrendered in front of the procession. The SDO Dobhal and other captured state functionaries also marched as prisoners. The kings army and administration also surrendered on 14 January. The state was now in the hands of revolutionaries who ran the administration until 1 August 1949, when the princely state of Tehri was legally merged within the union of India.
