= Mukandi Lal =

- Born: 14 October 1885; Chamoli Garhwal, British India
- Died: 10 January 1982 (aged 96)
- Occupations: Lawyer; Freedom Fighter; Art Historian

Barrister Mukandi Lal (14 October 1885 - 10 January 1982) was an Indian advocate, judge, freedom fighter, politician, writer and art critic hailing from Chamoli Garhwal, British India.

== Early life ==
Mukandi Lal was born in Paduli village, Malla Nagpur patti in Chamoli, Garhwal of British India.

His early education was in Pauri and Almora, followed by higher education in Allahabad, Calcutta and Oxford.

As a student of Muir central college, Allahabad, Lal accompanied Lala Lajpat Rai in his tour of Kumaon and Garhwal during the famine of 1913. He studied law at Oxford University. His education at Christ Church College, Oxford was sponsored by Ghanananad Khanduri, a local philanthropist.

== Career ==
Lal was an advocate in the Allahabad High Court beginning in 1919 and served as a Judge of the High Court in Tehri-Garhwal State.

He was the founder and editor of the newspaper Tarun Kumaun (Young Kumaun). In 1921, Garhwali and Kumaoni youth rallied against the coolie beggar system and Lal met Garhwali students from Varanasi on the issue.

=== Activist ===
Lal represented Kumaon along with Pandit Govind Ballabh Pant in the Convention of the United Provinces Congress in November 1920, prior to the Nagpur session during which it was decided that the propaganda for Non-cooperation movement would also be carried out in Kumaon. Lal represented Garhwal.

Mukandi Lal was the legal counsel of the 60 soldiers of 39th Garhwal Rifles accused of mutiny during the Peshawar Incident (Qissa Khwani Bazaar massacre) in 1930, when they refused to open fire against unarmed Pathan satyagrahis of Khudai Khidmatgar protesting the unlawful arrest of Khan Abdul Ghaffar Khan. Lal went from Lansdowne to Peshawar and reduced the sentence of many from a death penalty to life imprisonment and property were seizure. He is credited for saving the 'Hero of Peshawar' - platoon commander Chandra Singh - from death-penalty.

== Art Historian ==
Lal became the definitive authority on the Garhwal School of Miniature Painting and the genre's most prolific artists - Mola Ram. He authored the book Garhwal Paintings widely regarded as the maxime momenti on the subject, published by the Indian Department of Publications in 1968.

Mukandi Lad's childhood neighbour in Srinagar was a descendant of Mola Ram's and acquainted Lal to miniatures and poems composed by the artist. Lal was able to realise the significance of the works and began analyzing them during his university breaks on visits to his Srinagar. Spanning a period of 50 years, Lal began collecting works by various painters of the Garwhal School and compiling their history. Lal acquired his final painting in 1958.

He was awarded the fellowship of State Lalit Kala Akademi, Uttar Pradesh in 1972 and his work was recognised by the All India Fine Arts & Crafts Society in 1978.

== Books ==
1. Garhwal Painting
