= Jai Vardhan Bahuguna =

Indian soldier and mountaineer (1948–1985)

Major Jai Vardhan Bahuguna KC, SM, VSM
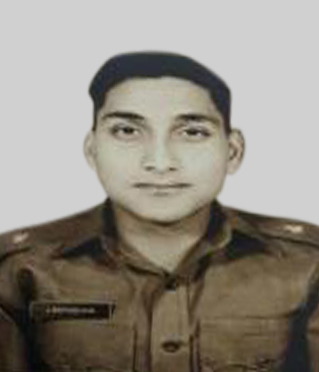
- Born: 1948; Dehradun, Uttar Pradesh (now Uttarakhand), India,
- Died: 10 October 1985 (aged 37); Mount Everest, Nepal
- Education: Indian Military Academy
- Military career
- Allegiance: India
- Branch: Indian Army
- Rank: Major
- Unit: Indian Army Corps of Engineers
- Known for: Mountaineer; Second person of Indian Antarctic Programme
- Awards: Kirti Chakra; Sena Medal; Vishisht Seva Medal

Major Jai Vardhan Bahuguna, KC, SC, VSM (1948 — 10 October 1985) was a leading mountaineer of India and an Indian Army officer with the Corps of Engineers. He fell and died in an Indian Army expedition to Mount Everest in October 1985, in which four other army officers were also killed. This was his second unsuccessful attempt to scale the Everest.

== Early life ==
The third son of Mr. and Mrs. Surya Datt Bahuguna, Maj. Bahuguna was born in Dehradun (E.C Road) where he spend his childhood and was educated at Allen Memorial School, Mussoorie. After getting commissioned into the Bengal Sappers (Later 1 Para) in the Indian Army, Bahuguna followed in his brother, Maj. Harsh Vardhan Bahuguna's footsteps to take up mountaineering. Harsh had also fallen and died in his second unsuccessful attempt to scale the Everest. He was a member of several expeditions including Kanchenjunga. He was also selected for the Second Indian Antarctic Expedition which sailed from Goa in December 1982. Several engineering tasks were executed including construction of two shelters provided by CBRI Roorkee and layout of a runway. He was awarded the Sena Medal for his dedication and performance.

== Attempt at Mount Everest ==
His first attempt at Mount Everest in 1984 was in an expedition that is better remembered for putting the first Indian woman, Bachendri Pal on the summit. It was decided that the other members of the expedition, i.e. Maj. Bahuguna, Maj. Kiran Inder Kumar, Magan Bissa and Dr. Minoo Meta would form the second summit party which would make summit only if resources permitted. The second summit party opted to give their reserve oxygen to Bachendri Pal, so that she could summit the peak.

The 35 member Army expedition of October 1985, was Maj. Bahuguna's second attempt to scale the peak. The expedition ended on a tragic note with the death of five members. First, Maj. Kiran Kumar fell along the south east ridge route. He suffered head injuries and died on the spot. Four days later four other members – Maj. Jai Vardhan Bahuguna, Capt. Vijaya Pal Singh Negi, Maj. Ranjit Singh Bakshi and Lt. MUB Rao – died in one of the worst mountaineering tragedies.

Maj. Bahuguna died shortly after the arrival of the rescue squad. He was 37 years old at the time of his death. Newspaper reports had then attributed the cause of death due to dehydration, injuries and exposure to cold after being stranded for four days. The freak Himalayan weather made rescue and salvage operations impossible. He was awarded the Kirti Chakra posthumously.

== Tribute ==
Maj. Jai Vardhan Bahuguna died at South Col, very close to the spot where his elder brother, Maj. Harsh Vardhan Bahuguna had died fourteen years before. As a tribute to both the brothers, the auditorium at the Nehru Institute of Mountaineering has been named after them as 'Jai Harsh Bahuguna Auditorium'.
