= Harsh Vardhan Bahuguna =

Mountaineer

Major Harsh Vardhan Bahuguna
- Born: 1939; Dehradun, Uttar Pradesh (now Uttarakhand), India,
- Died: 18 April 1971 (aged 31/32); Mount Everest, Nepal
- Cause of death: Falling (accident)
- Education: Indian Military Academy
- Military career
- Allegiance: India
- Branch: Indian Army
- Rank: Major
- Unit: Indian Army Armoured Corps
- Known for: Mountaineer; Instructor of High Altitude Warfare School, Gulmarg
- Awards: Padma Shri

Major Harsh Vardhan Bahuguna (1939 – April 18, 1971) was a leading mountaineer of India and a military officer. He was an instructor of skiing and mountaineering at the High Altitude Warfare School, Gulmarg and had successfully climbed many mountains.

== Death ==
He died as part of the international expedition on Mount Everest on April 18, 1971. That was his second attempt to scale Everest. He had to abort his first expedition in 1965 just 400 feet short of the summit. Fourteen years later, in October 1985 his younger brother, Major Jai Vardhan Bahuguna, also lost his life in a fall during a Mount Everest expedition of the Indian Army, along with four other army officers. Neither of the brothers would summit Mount Everest and both died near the same area, each in their second unsuccessful summit attempt of Everest.

== Awards ==
He was posthumously awarded the Padma Shri by Government of India in 1972.
