= Umra Narayan =

Hindu Temple in Uttarakhand, India

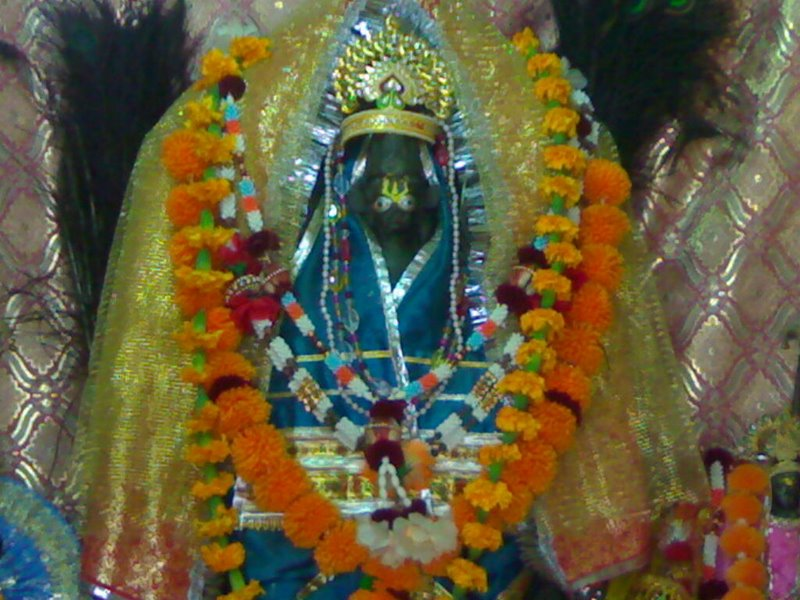

- Location in Uttarakhand

Religion
- Affiliation: Hinduism
- District: Rudraprayag
- Deity: Bhagwan Vishnu
- Festival: Ram Naumi

Location
- Location: Umrola Sour
- State: Uttarakhand
- Country: India
- Interactive map of Umra Narayan
- Coordinates: 30.28°N 78.98°E

Architecture
- Type: North Indian architecture
- Creator: Unknown
- Completed: Unknown
- Elevation: 895 m (2,936 ft)

Umra Narayan is a Hindu temple dedicated to Vishnu. The temple is 5–7 km from the main town of Rudraprayag in Uttarakhand, India.

== Origins ==
This temple was built by Adi Shankaracharya when he was on his way to Badri Dhaam.

After each harvest, the first group of crops are endowed in the holy Charnas of the Isth Dev. Long time ago villagers of Umrolla Sour people appoint Gairola pandit for Daily Worship of Bhagwan Umara narayan at Temple Premises. The temple is currently under the supervision of Mahant Sarju Das ji. Jai Badri Vishaal, Jai Umra Narayan.
