= Sarola Brahmin =

Garhwali brahmin sub-caste from Uttarakhand, India

Sarola\Saryul\Serul
- Classification: Brahmin
- Religions: Hinduism
- Languages: Garhwali
- Populated states: Uttarakhand, India
- Related groups: Garhwali people

Sarola Brahmin, also called Saryul and Serul, are the oldest Garhwali Brahmins from Uttarakhand, India. These families were founded in the 6th and 7th centuries by scions of multiple Brahmin magnate clans to rule as the sacerdotal aristocracy of the Himalayan Kingdoms.

== History ==
The Sarolas originally were 12 ancient houses: Nautiyals, Maitwanas, Khanduras, Raturis, Thapliyals, Chamolis, Semwals, Lakheras, Semaltis, Gairolas, Kothiyals and Dimris. However, the oldest families, often exclusively Sarola and with the most illustrious lineages, such as the Kanyakubja Joshis (the oldest of the leading Satkuli or 7 Brahmin lineages of Kumaon where they served as hereditary prime ministers since the Sixth century) or the Rajpurohit Gaur Nautiyals (hereditary prime ministers in Garhwal) or the Maithil Uniyals (in Garhwal) held a higher ducal status as Taluqdars or Thakurs and were themselves descendants of royal and leading Brahmin ducal houses from the pre-medieval kingdoms of their origins such as the Nautiyals of Malwa, Joshis of the Carnatic or Uniyals of Magadha.

The Uniyals, Bahugunas, Dobhals, and Dangwals were the oldest Gangari Brahmins founded in the 8th century after the first Sarola families, but due to their ancient lineage from classical dynasties of the Gangetic Plains of Bihar, Bengal and Ayodhya, they were afforded the same high status as the Sarola Houses and formed the class of Chauthoki aristocrats. The Chauthoki houses were pre-eminent nobility in Tehri Garhwal as counterpart to the Sarolas being the high lords in Pauri Garhwal and Chamoli Garhwal.

These Brahmin houses maintained vast interests in landholding, finance and hereditary ministerial positions along with custodianship of the great temples of North India as hereditary 'Ravals' (high priests or archbishops) such as Yamunotri under the Uniyals, Gangotri under the Semwals, Kedarnath under the Dimris, Joshimath under the Joshis, Nanda Devi under the Nautiyals, and the highest Hindu ecclesiastical authority in the north: the temple of Badrinath under the Nambudris who bore the dynastic title of 'Shankaracharya' (pontiff) due to their direct descent from Adisankara of the eighth century who established all these great temples in North India. The greatest ecclesiastical seats of Hinduism are the 4 Pontifical Thrones of the Char Dham (Badrinath, Puri, Rameswaram, Dwarka) and the 4 High Sees of the Chota Char Dham (Badrinath - Joshimath, Kedarnath - Nanda Devi, Yamunotri, Gangotri) as well as the 12 Jyotrlingas of which Kedarnath is the highest and most sacred due to its proximity to the divine abode of Lord Shiva at Kailasa.

The Sarolas and Chauthokis settled as Rajpurohits (grand viziers), royal astrologers, high priests, ritual cooks, royal gurus, and royal advisors and ministers. They were also designated the task of cooking ritual temple offerings on auspicious occasions and also on royal occasions by the King of Garhwal, thus named "Sarola" (Garhwali for cooking offerings) due to the ritual purity of the Sarola Brahmins which meant only their hand could prepare the oblations.

== See also ==
- Gangari Brahmin
