= Manglesh Dabral =

Indian poet and journalist (1948–2020)

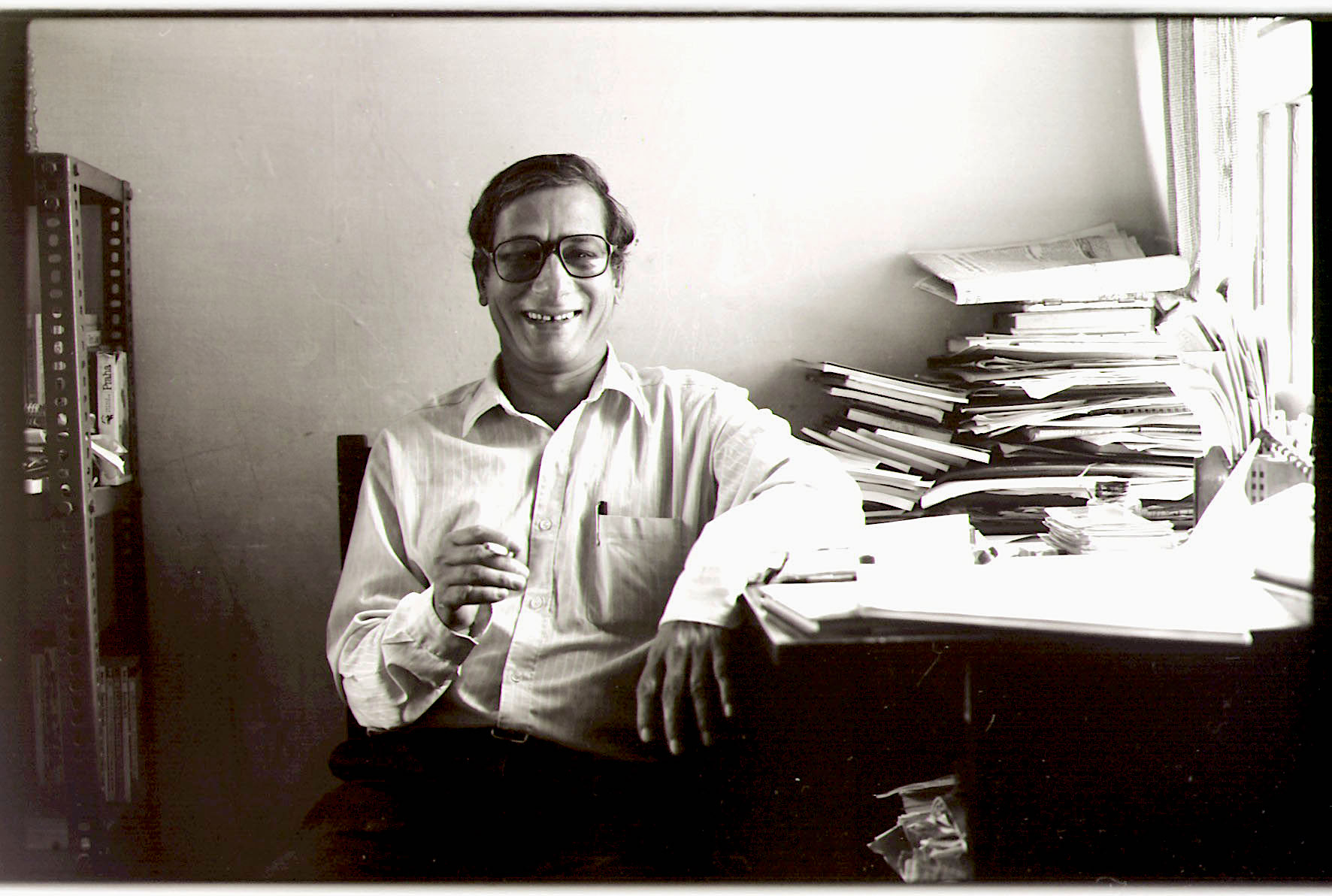
- Dabral in December 1993
- Born: 16 May 1948; Kaphalpani, Princely State of Tehri Garhwal, Dominion of India (present-day Uttarakhand, India)
- Died: 9 December 2020 (aged 72); New Delhi, India
- Occupations: Hindi poet; journalist
- Notable work: Ham Jo Dekhte Hain (anthology)
- Awards: Sahitya Akademi Award (2000)

Manglesh Dabral (16 May 1948 – 9 December 2020) was an Indian Hindi poet and journalist. He was associated with Hindi-language newspapers including Jansatta, Hindi Patriot, and Purvagrah. Some of his popular works include Pahar Par Lalten (transl. lamp on the hills), Ghar Ka Rasta (transl. the way home), and Kavi Ka Akelapan (transl. loneliness of a poet). He was a recipient of the Sahitya Akademi Award in 2000 for his anthology Ham Jo Dekhte Hain (transl. what we see).

== Early life ==
Dabral was born on 16 May 1948, in the village of Kaphalpani, Princely State of Tehri Garhwal (now in the Indian state of Uttarakhand). He completed his education in Dehradun.

== Career ==
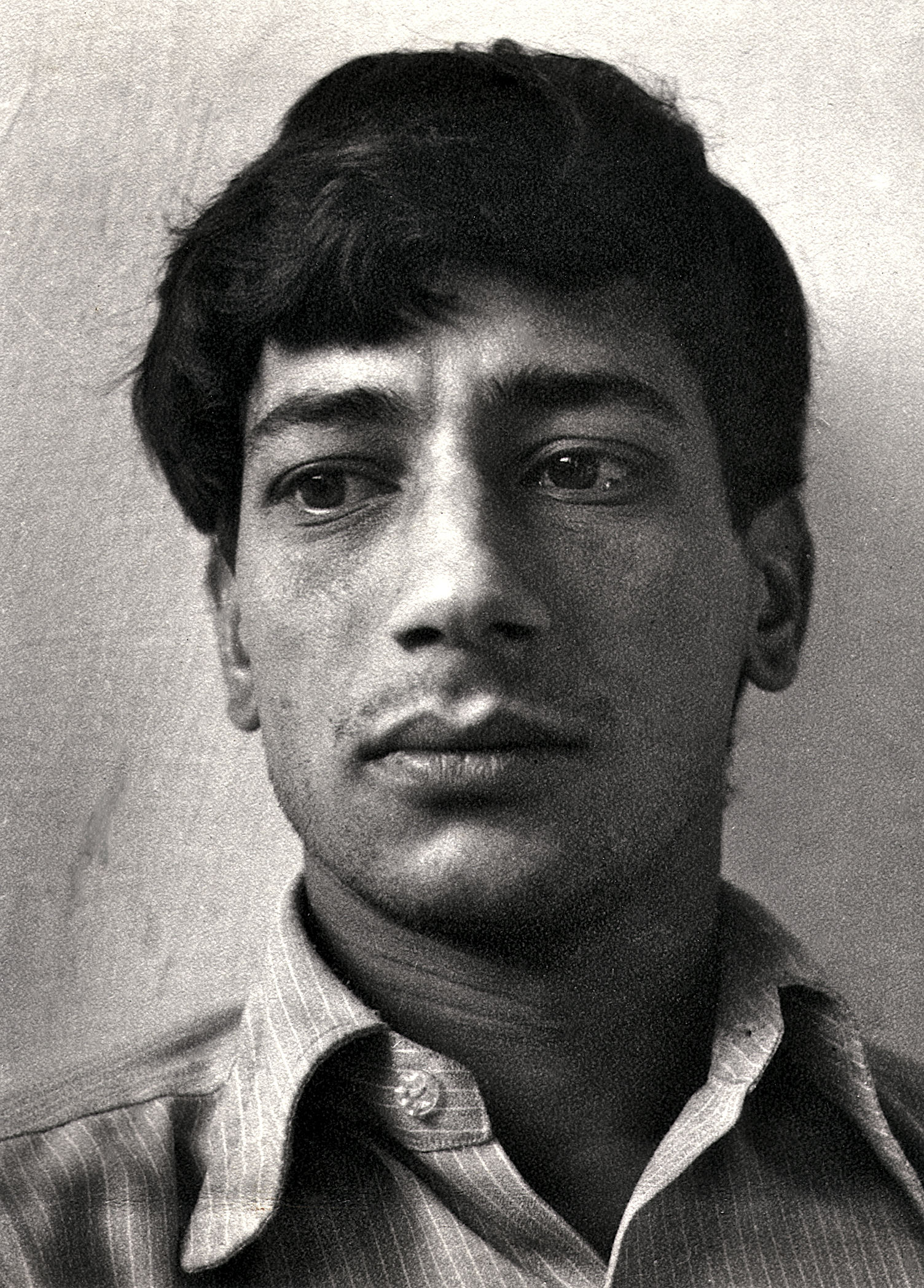
Manglesh Dabral in 1974, Delhi

Moving to Delhi in the late 1960s, Dabral worked at the vernacular newspapers Hindi Patriot, Pratipaksh and Aaspaas. He then moved to Bhopal, in the Indian state of Madhya Pradesh to work as an editor for Bharat Bhavan's Purvagrah. He went on to work for Amrit Prabhat published from Allahabad and Lucknow before going on to being the editor of Jansatta and later at Sahara Samay. He also worked with the National Book Trust as an editorial consultant, and with the Hindi monthly magazine Public Agenda as its editor. He was noted as the editor of Jansatta's Sunday magazine, Ravivari where he mentored a generation of Hindi writers. In his roles he was described as a key link between literature and journalism.

He published five collections of poetry, Pahar Par Lalten, Ghar Ka Rasta, Ham Jo Dekhte Hain, Awaz Bhi Ek Jagah Hai and Naye Yug Men Shatru, two collections of prose Lekhak Ki Roti and Kavi Ka Akelapan, and a travel diary Ek Bar Iowa. He translated Booker Prize winning author Arundhati Roy's The Ministry of Utmost Happiness to Hindi as Apar Khushi Ka Gharana.

He received the Sahitya Akademi Award given by Sahitya Akademi, India's National Academy of Letters, in 2000 for his poetry collection Ham Jo Dekhte Hain. Dabral's poetry has been translated in all major Indian languages, and a number of foreign languages, including English, Russian, German, Dutch, Spanish, Portuguese, Italian, French, Polish and Bulgarian. He was the recipient of the World Writers Program fellowship at the University of Iowa, in the United States.

He was a vocal critic of the Indian government, and his works reflected dissent. He returned his Sahitya Akademi Award in 2015 in a protest that saw many Indian writers returning their awards. His final work, Naye Yug Men Shatru (transl. foes in the modern world), was considered a poetic commentary on the nation's current affairs.

Dabral was considered among the foremost contemporary Hindi language poets. He was credited to having brought in a new sensibility to contemporary Hindi poetry, with the use of low key and precise language. Hindi poet Asad Zaidi noted that "he was not a showy poet, but in his understated fashion, he brought magic to Hindi poetry." His poetry described his longing for the hills, the idea of home and displacement, representing the places that he came from. Some of his works speak to the sensitivity and helplessness of a man trapped in the nowhere land between the city and his home, longing to go back to his home in the hills. His journalistic works gave a voice to the marginalised. Journalist Mrinal Pande said, "He was one of the most incisive minds in Hindi."

== Personal life and death ==
Dabral was married and had a daughter and a son. He died from COVID-19 complications at AIIMS New Delhi on 9 December 2020, during the COVID-19 pandemic in India. He was 72. Dabral was undergoing treatment in a private hospital in Ghaziabad for the few days before being admitted to AIIMS, where his condition deteriorated, suffering a cardiac arrest.

== Works ==
=== Poetry ===
- Pahar Par Lalten
- Ghar Ka Rasta
- Ham Jo Dekhte Hain
- Awaz Bhi Ek Jagah Hai
- Naye Yug Men Shatru

=== Prose ===
- Lekhak Ki Roti
- Kavi Ka Akelapan
- Ek Bar Iowa

== Sources ==
- "मंगलेश डबराल". कविता कोश. Archived from the original on 5 August 2014.
- "Manglesh Dabral". Foundation of SAARC Writers and Literature. Archived from the original on 12 August 2014.
- "Vikram Seth, Mahasweta Devi and Manglesh Dabral are popular in Pak: Fahmida Riaz". The Times of India. 24 March 2013. Archived from the original on 27 March 2013.
