= Gangari Brahmin =

Garhwali Brahmin sub-caste in Uttarakhand, India

Gangari\Gangadi
- Classification: Brahmin
- Religions: Hinduism
- Languages: Garhwali
- Populated states: Uttarakhand, India
- Related groups: Garhwali people

Gangari Brahmin is a Brahmin subcaste originating from the Garhwal region of Uttarakhand, India. They were settled in the villages surrounding the Ganges valley hence known as "Gangari" Brahmins.

== See also ==
- Sarola Brahmin

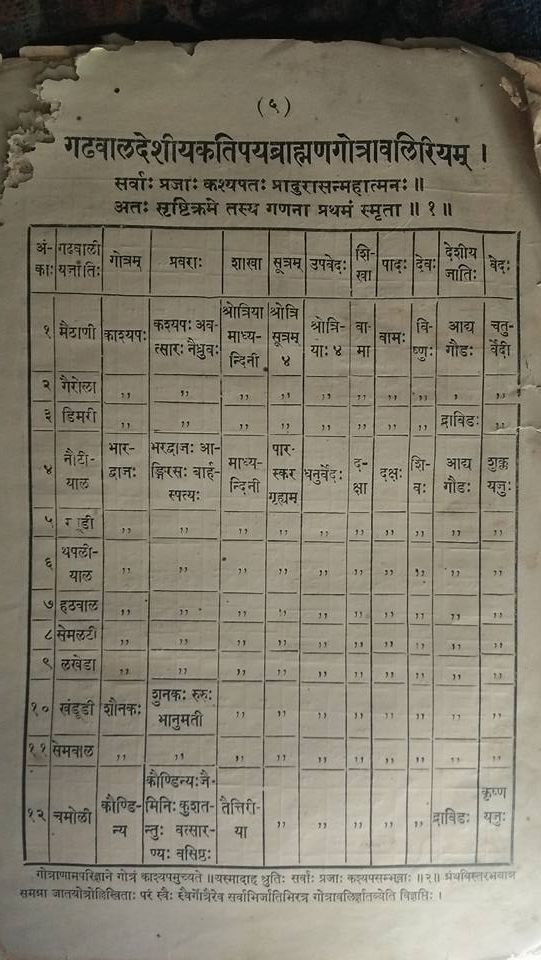
Garhwali Brahmin surname and gotra of Uttarakhand-I: From an ancient manuscript

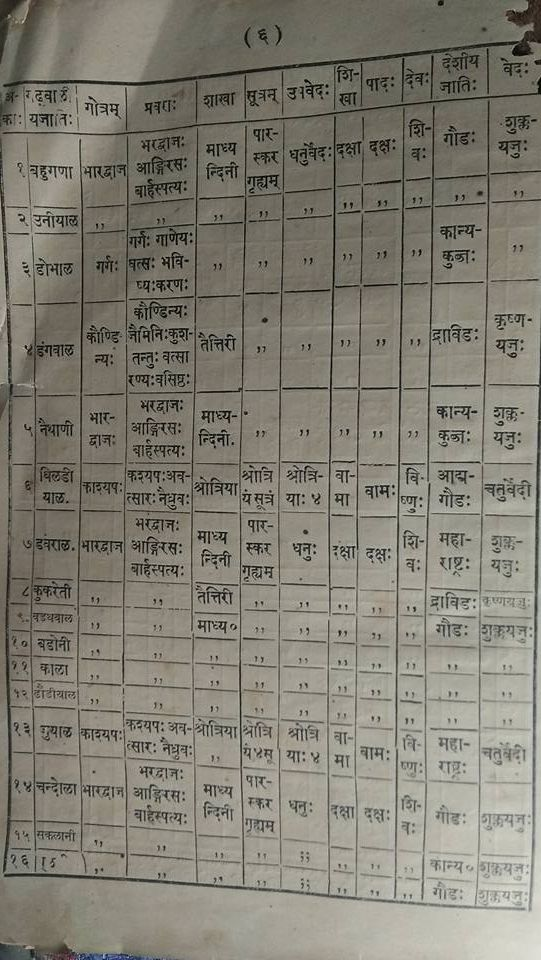
Garhwali Brahmin surname and gotra of Uttarakhand-II: From an ancient manuscript
