= Dabral Baba =

Indian yogi and spiritual teacher (1932–2016)

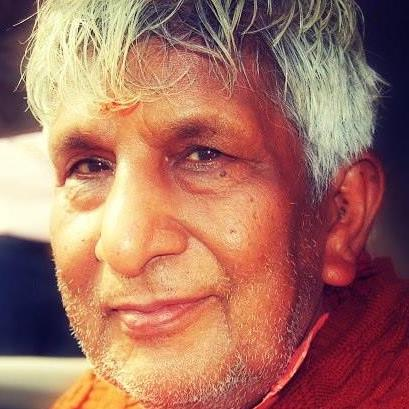

Personal life
- Born: Govind Prasad Kukreti; 25 August 1932 Timli village, Pauri Garhwal district, United Province, British India (present-day Uttarakhand, India)
- Died: 31 August 2016 (aged 84) Ujjain, Madhya Pradesh, India
- Notable work(s): Discovery and restoration of Vikrant Bhairav Temple; spiritual teaching and guidance
- Honors: Baba, Shri Dabral Baba

Religious life
- Religion: Hinduism

Religious career
- Teacher: Vikrant Bhairav, Mahavatar Babaji

Dabral Babaji (25 August 1932 – 31 August 2016), born as Govind Prasad Kukreti, was an Indian yogi and devoted disciple of Vikrant Bhairav. He was also a student of the legendary spiritual master Mahavatar Babaji, known through Paramhansa Yogananda's Autobiography of a Yogi.

Dabral Babaji chose an unconventional spiritual path. Unlike many traditional yogis who renounced worldly life, he lived as a householder—he married, raised a family, and worked as faculty at Vikram University in Ujjain, Madhya Pradesh. He maintained his residence, Bhairav Niwas, in the Rishinagar district of Ujjain, where he balanced academic duties with intensive spiritual practice. He adopted the surname Dabral after his maternal uncle, who raised him in Dhar and later in Ujjain.

== Biography ==
=== Early life ===
Dabral Babaji was born in Timli, a village in Pauri Garhwal district in the United Provinces of British India, a region now part of Uttarakhand. His childhood was divided between two places—Timli with his maternal grandparents and Kathoor with his paternal grandparents. In his formative years, he moved to Dhar, a district headquarters in the Indore Division, and subsequently to Ujjain, an ancient pilgrimage city in Madhya Pradesh renowned for its spiritual significance.

=== Discovery of Vikrant Bhairav Temple ===
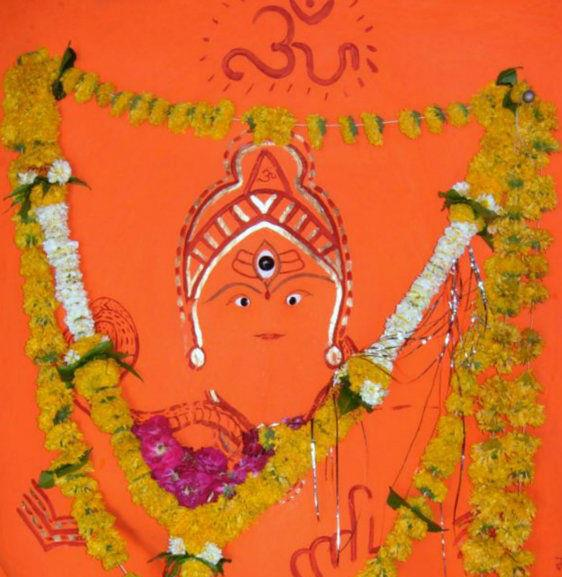
The Vikrant Bhairav Temple at Ujjain

In 1960, while meditating at the Kal Bhairav temple, Dabral Babaji experienced a strong inner compulsion to visit the Shipra River. Upon reaching the riverbank to wash his hands, a saint sitting there directed him to walk along the north side of the river. Following this guidance, Dabral Babaji came upon a desolate, mud-covered area where he discovered the Vikrant Bhairav idol, which had been buried deep in mud for years. As he approached the idol, he perceived the image of Vikrant Bhairav gradually becoming visible, standing with folded hands. In reverence, he filled an earthen lamp with oil, lit it, placed roses before the idol, and lit many incense sticks, then departed the place filled with joy and wonder at having found what he described as "the place of his dream."

=== The Divine Illumination ===
That same year, during the Diwali festival on a windy night, Dabral Babaji returned to light an earthen lamp before the idol of Vikrant Bhairav and quickly departed. Concerned that the wind would extinguish the lamp, he turned back to check. To his astonishment, instead of a single flame, he witnessed the entire area brilliantly illuminated with hundreds of earthen lamps, while the image of Vikrant Bhairav shone with radiant splendor. Moved by this vision, he hastened to the nearby temple of Kal Bhairav, where an elderly man was meditating.

Upon hearing Dabral Babaji's account of the miraculous sight, the old man accompanied him back to the riverbank to witness the illumination themselves. The elderly man then bowed to touch Dabral Babaji's feet and addressed him with reverence as "Baba"—a title of spiritual honor. This transformative moment marked a turning point in Dabral Babaji's life, after which he devoted himself to the worship and service of Vikrant Bhairav.

=== Association with Mahavatar Babaji ===
In the later years of his life, Dabral Babaji spoke of a profound communion with Mahavatar Babaji, the deathless guru whom Paramhansa Yogananda described in Autobiography of a Yogi as the eternal guide of Lahiri Mahasaya. According to Dabral Babaji, Mahavatar Babaji visited him periodically, guided his spiritual journey, and spoke sparingly, embodying a childlike simplicity and rarely revealing his inner nature. Dabral Babaji described receiving instruction that Mahavatar Babaji took him to his cave and invited him to remain in his spiritual circle (dera), saying he would often be taken to visit. Dabral Babaji claimed that Mahavatar Babaji maintained a group of advanced disciples, including what he described as two white foreigners, and that this spiritual community would journey together on their work.

==== Encounters During Kumbh Mela 2016 ====
During the Kumbh Mela of 2016 held in Ujjain, Dabral Babaji reported several instances of encountering Mahavatar Babaji:

First Sighting: While in deep meditation at his home in Bhairav Niwas, Dabral Babaji asked his disciple to turn on the television. Pointing at the live broadcast of the Kumbh Snan (ritual bathing ceremony) on the Shipra River, he directed his wife and a devotee named Yogesh to observe a young man, approximately 25 years old, taking a ritual dip amid the crowds. Dabral Babaji identified this young sadhu as Mahavatar Babaji. He then predicted that the figure would shake his matted locks (jata) to wash them. According to the account, Yogesh and Dabral Babaji's wife witnessed the young man perform exactly this action before the camera moved to other scenes.

Second Sighting: During the same Kumbh Mela period, while in deep communion, Dabral Babaji pointed out a white foreign woman walking through the crowd with a cloth bag on her shoulder. He indicated to those present that this woman was Mahavatar Babaji manifesting in female form to participate in the ritual bathing and receive offerings.

Third Account: In 2015, while suffering from age-related ailments—swelling in his legs and pain that prevented him from visiting the temple regularly—Dabral Babaji recounted requesting Mahavatar Babaji for the strength to perform his ritual duties during Bhairav Jayanti. According to his account, Mahavatar Babaji responded in meditation, saying, "Kal Tumhe hum 25 saal ka bana denge" (I shall make you 25 years old tomorrow). Dabral Babaji reported that the following morning, he awoke in a youthful body, walked independently to the temple, and performed elaborate worship rituals (puja and yagna) throughout the day. He stated that while performing the worship, Mahavatar Babaji was present with him, and upon returning to his home and bed, his aged body returned.

=== Spiritual Influence and Teaching ===
During the 2016 Kumbh Mela in Ujjain, numerous advanced yogis and spiritual practitioners from across India and the Himalayan regions publicly acknowledged Dabral Babaji as a spiritually realized master (param-avatar), attributing his spiritual authority to his direct guidance from Mahavatar Babaji. Many came to seek his spiritual counsel and received his blessings.

Dabral Babaji maintained an open door at his residence, where he received approximately 250 visitors daily seeking his blessings and spiritual guidance. Remarkably, he would address visitors by name as they arrived and speak to their personal concerns without their having disclosed them, attributing this knowledge to his communion with his master. When offering counsel, he would say, "Baba bol rahe" (His master is speaking), positioning himself as a channel for higher wisdom rather than claiming personal authority.

=== Character and Legacy ===
Known for his childlike simplicity and complete selflessness, Dabral Babaji maintained a meditative consciousness throughout his daily life, remaining in what he described as "deep subconscious communion with higher bodies" even while engaging with visitors. He displayed equal compassion and respect to all who came before him, regardless of social status or background.

Significantly, Dabral Babaji never accepted personal donations. Any offerings received at his temple were returned to devotees in the form of prasad (blessed food and grace). He offered prayers on behalf of visitors for the resolution of their difficulties, embodying what he regarded as the selfless spirit of a true master. His simplicity, selflessness, and compassionate presence attracted spiritual seekers from throughout India and abroad, establishing him as a notable figure in contemporary Hindu spirituality during the late twentieth and early twenty-first centuries.
