= P. L. Gairola =

P. L. Gairola (born 15 December 1948), was the chairman and managing director (CMD) of Dena Bank, a leading commercial bank of India. He was appointed to this position by the Government of India (GoI), and assumed the charge of the bank as its CMD on 17 May 2006.

Before being appointed as the CMD of Dena Bank, Gairola was the executive director of Bank of India, where he had assumed this office on 20 June 2005 upon being appointed by the GoI.

He is an economist, and he has worked as a lecturer in Delhi University in early 1970s. In 1973, he joined the Union Bank of India, where he worked in different capacities including as the Branch Manager, the Zonal Manager and the General Manager. Before he was moved to BoI, he was heading the Credit and the Social Banking Division of the Union Bank of India.

He was also associated with a number of committees of that bank for formulating policies and guidelines. He had also worked as the Principal of Union Bank of India's training facility for two and half years, and during his tenure as the principal the training facility, the facility received ISO certification. For some time, he was also a member of the Core group of the Energy Efficient Project of the World Bank. As a member of the core group, he visited Brazil in 2004 under the cross country exchange program of the core group. In 1998, he had participated in the advanced banking training program organized by the Barclays Bank in London. In 2003, he had been a member of an international Seminar of the bankers and financial institutions at Singapore. The Seminar was organized by Citibank.
