= List of people from Uttarakhand =

This is a list of famous and notable people from Uttarakhand, India.

== Science and Humanities ==
- Ravindra Singh Bisht, Indian archaeologist, Padma Shri recipient
- Anupam Joshi, cyber security expert and Professor
- J. P. Joshi, archaeologist
- Lal Mani Joshi, Buddhist scholar
- M. C. Joshi, Indian archaeologist who served as Director General of the Archaeological Survey of India (ASI) from 1990 to 1993.
- Pooran Chand Joshi, social anthropologist
- Shri Krishna Joshi, physicist
- Yashodhar Mathpal, archaeologist, painter, curator, Gandhian and Rock art conservationist.
- Janardan Ganpatrao Negi, theoretical geophysicist
- Ghananand Pande, scientist
- Govind Chandra Pande, Indian scholar, philosopher and historian of the Vedic and Buddhist periods
- M. C. Pant, radiation oncologist
- Nilamber Pant, space pioneer
- Krishna Singh Rawat, surveyor cartographer
- Nain Singh Rawat, C.I.E., first person to survey Tibet
- Dalip Kumar Upreti, lichenologist
- Khadg Singh Valdiya, geologist and environmentalist
- Kharag Singh Valdiya, Indian geologist and a former vice chancellor of Kumaon University, Padam Shri in 2007 and Padam Bhushan in 2015

== Arts and culture ==
- B. K. Samant, folk singer
- Chander Singh Rahi, prominent folk singer and researcher from Uttarakhand. Fondly described as the “Bhishma Pitamah of Uttarakhand folk music”
- Dev Negi, Bollywood Playback Singer
- Girish Tiwari (Girda) (1942–2010), poet and folk singer
- Gunanand Pathik, freedom fighter and poet
- Jubin Nautiyal, Indian singer
- Meena Rana – Indian folk singer
- Mohan Upreti, folk singer, composer of the classic Kumaoni song Bedu Pako Baro Masa
- Mola Ram, Indian Painter
- Naima Khan Upreti
- Narendra Singh Negi – Indian folk singer
- Pawandeep Rajan, Indian Idol 2020, Season 12 winner
- Prem Matiyani (1950– 2016), theatre director, Sangeet Natak Akademi Award (2001)
- Pritam Bhartwan – Indian folk singer
- Shivanku Bhatt– former model and actor
- Surendra Pal Joshi, artist known for paintings, sculptures and murals

== Cinema ==
- Anukriti Gusain
- Asha Negi
- Barkha Bisht
- Chitrashi Rawat
- Deepak Dobriyal
- Gopal Datt
- Hemant Pandey
- Himani Shivpuri
- Jyotsna Chandola
- Madhurima Tuli
- Manasvi Mamgai
- Nirmal Pandey
- Prasoon Joshi
- Raghav Juyal
- Ragini Nandwani
- Richa Panai
- Roop Durgapal
- Sakshi Chaudhary
- Shilpa Saklani
- Shruti Bisht
- Sukirti Kandpal
- Tigmanshu Dhulia
- Triptii Dimri
- Urvashi Rautela
- Varun Badola
- Vibha Anand

== Theatre ==
- B. P. Singh, C.I.D creator and producer
- B. M. Shah
- Mohan Upreti
- Tom Alter

== Defence ==
- Brigadier Surendra Singh Panwar
- Lieutenant General Lakshman Singh Rawat - Former Deputy Chief of the Army Staff and father of General Bipin Rawat.
- General Bipin Rawat – 1st Chief of Defence Staff of India
- General Anil Chauhan – 2nd Chief of Defence Staff of India
- Gabar Singh Negi, Victoria Cross Garhwal Rifles
- Lt. General M. M. Lakhera, ex-Governor of Mizoram, ex-Lieutenant Governor of Pondicherry
- Havaldar Gajender Singh, Ashoka Chakra
- Rajesh Singh Adhikari, Maha Vir Chakra
- Captain Ummed Singh Mahra, He was awarded the Ashoka Chakra, India's highest peacetime military decoration.
- General Bipin Chandra Joshi, Chief of Army Staff of Indian Army
- Admiral Devendra Kumar Joshi, Chief of Naval Staff of Indian Navy
- Lt. Col. Manabendra Shah
- Major General Bhuwan Chandra Khanduri
- Jaswant Singh Rawat, recipient of Maha Vir Chakra in Indo-China War, 1962
- Darwan Singh Negi, Victoria Cross from 1st Battalion of 39th Garhwal Rifles
- Ajit Kumar Doval, 5th National Security Adviser of India
- Naik Mohan Nath Goswami, recipient of Ashoka Chakra
- Havildar Bahadur Singh Bohra, recipient of Ashoka Chakra
- Laxman Lucky Bisht, Former Indian Spy & Commando

== Police ==
- Mohan Chand Sharma

== Literature ==
- Shivprasad Dabral Charan; Hindi & Garhwali writer, historian, poet
- Manglesh Dabral, Hindi writer, poet
- Sumitranandan Pant, Hindi writer, poet
- Shekhar Pathak, Hindi writer, academic
- Shivani, Hindi writer
- Shailesh Matiyani, Hindi writer
- Manohar Shyam Joshi, writer, screenwriter
- Ramachandra Guha, writer, historian
- Girish Tiwari (Girda), writer, poet
- Namita Gokhale, English writer
- Shekhar Joshi
- Pushpesh Pant, Indian historian and food critic
- Uma Bhatt
- Namrata Joshi, Journalist
- Manoj Joshi
- Prasoon Joshi, lyricist, poet, advertiser; chief executive offer and chairman of McCann World group India

== Politics ==
- Govind Ballabh Pant
- Indramani Badoni, Statehood activist
- Hemwati Nandan Bahuguna
- Murli Manohar Joshi
- Mala Raj Laxmi Shah
- Mohan Singh Bisht
- Harish Rawat
- K.C. Pant
- N.D. Tiwari
- Bhuvan Chandra Khanduri
- Ram Prasad Nautiyal
- Trivendra Singh Rawat
- Harak Singh Rawat
- Yogi Adityanath, 21st Chief Minister of Uttar Pradesh

== Chief Ministers ==
- Nityanand Swami
- Bhagat Singh Koshyari
- Narayan Dutt Tiwari
- Bhuwan Chandra Khanduri
- Ramesh Pokhriyal
- Vijay Bahuguna
- Harish Rawat

== Sports ==
- Chandraprabha Aitwal, mountaineer
- Major Harsh Vardhan Bahuguna, mountaineer; died in the international expedition to the Mount Everest on 18 April 1971
- Abhinav Bindra, shooter; won Olympic gold in the 10 m air rifle event in 2008
- Ekta Bisht, first international cricketer from Uttarakhand
- Madhumita Bisht, badminton player
- Unmukt Chand, cricketer
- MS Dhoni, cricketer
- Hemlata Kala, cricketer
- Mir Ranjan Negi
- Parimarjan Negi
- Bachendri Pal, mountaineer; in 1984 became the first Indian woman to reach the summit of Mount Everest
- Manish Pandey, cricketer
- Jaspal Rana, shooter
- Arvind Raturi, youngest mountaineer of Uttarakhand to scale Mount Everest on 19 May 2013
- Lakshya Sen, Indian badminton player
- Labhanshu Sharma, wrestler
- Jagdish Singh, Winter Olympian
- Nain Singh, Asian explorer
- Pawan Suyal, cricketer
- Rishabh Pant, cricketer

== Law and Justice ==
- Prafulla Chandra Pant: Former Judge, Supreme Court of India
- Sudhanshu Dhulia: Judge, Supreme Court of India

== Others ==
- Pooran Chand Joshi, Professor of Social Anthropology, University of Delhi
- Prof. (Dr.) Prem Lal Joshi, academic professor, author
- Sundarlal Bahuguna, Chipko movement leader
- Vandana Shiva, environmentalist
- Yashodhar Mathpal, archaeologist, painter, curator, and rock art conservationist, recipient of the Padma Shri
- Anurag Chauhan, social worker
- Deepak Rawat, Indian civil servant
