= Chander Singh Rahi =

Indian folk singer, poet, and storyteller (1942–2016)

- Born: March 28, 1942; Giwali, Pauri, Garhwal Division, United Provinces of Agra and Oudh
- Died: January 10, 2016 (aged 73); New Delhi, India
- Known for: Indian Folk Music, Uttarakhand Folk Music, Garhwali Folk Music; Poetry

Chander Singh Rahi (born Chander Singh Negi; 28 March 1942 – 10 January 2016) was a prominent folk singer, songwriter, balladeer, musician, poet, storyteller, and cultural conservator from Uttarakhand, India.

In recognition of his deep devotion to the music and culture of Uttarakhand, he has been described as the "Bhishma Pitamah of Uttarakhand folk music".

== Early life ==
Rahi was born Chander Singh Negi to Dilbar Singh Negi and Sundara Devi in a Giwali village in Maudadsyun. He belonged to a modest Ghadiyal family from the Nayar Valley of Pauri in Garhwal, Uttarakhand. Rahi and his brother, Dev Raj Rangeela, learned the tradition of Pahari (originating from the hills) music from their father, a singer of the jagar music of Uttarakhand.

Rahi learned the foundations of Pahari music, including age-old traditional songs, musical instruments, and the cultural practices associated with the music of the Himalayas. As a child, he accompanied his father on traditional musical instruments, including the thakuli, the damru, and the huruki. Later in his life, Rahi learned Indian classical music with Keshav Anuragi and his guru, Bachan Singh.

== Musical career ==
Rahi debuted his singing career on the All India Radio (AIR) Delhi station on 13 March 1963, on a program for army personnel, with his song "Par veena ki". He started singing for AIR Lucknow in 1972. He continued gaining popularity in Uttarakhand through the 1970s and 1980s, when his songs were broadcast from the AIR Najibabad station, and Doordarshan. His was the first Garhwali voice to be heard on the radio. In 1966, Rahi composed his famous geet "Dil ko umaal" (Outpourings of the Heart) for his mentor, the Garhwali poet Kanhaiyalal Dandriyal, who is said to have given him the sobriquet Rahi (traveller).

Rahi sang more than 550 songs in the Garhwali and Kumaoni languages. His work was available on more than 140 audio cassettes. He performed live in over 1,500 shows across India. Some of his celebrated songs include Fwa Bagha Re, "Sarg tara junyali rata ko sunalo", "Fyonladiya, Dekh hilma chandi ku batana", "Chaita ki chaitwali", "Bhana ho rangeela bhana", "Satpuli ka senna meri bau surila", "Tile dharu bola Madhuli", "Tyere chadri chhutgye pichhne", and "Sauli ghura ghur". His first recorded album, Sauli ghura ghur, was a commercial hit.

Rahi was also poet. His poetry collections include Dil ko Umaal (1966), Dhai (1980), Ramchhol (1981), and Geet Ganga (2010). Rahi also wrote monographs and composed music for ballets.

Rahi was considered to be the only person who could play all the folk instruments of Uttarakhand, including the dhol damau (drums), the shehnai, the daur, the thaali, and the huruki. He also had knowledge of the unknown tala sequences (beat patterns) unique to Pahari music and would seamlessly incorporate these elements in his musical presentations.

Rahi collected and curated more than 2,500 age-old traditional songs covering various folk forms of Uttarakhand including "Khuder Geet", "Sanskar Geet", "Barhai", "Panwara", "Mela Geet", "Jhaura, Pandavani", "Chaunfla", "Thadiya", and "Jaagar". His book, A Comprehensive Study of the Songs, Musical Instruments, and Dances of the Central Himalayas, was to be published by Uttaranchal Sahitya, Sanskriti evam Kala Parishad. He was also an avid collector of folk musical instruments of Uttarakhand.

== Personal life ==
Rahi sold flutes for a living during his early days in Delhi, to which he had moved from his native Garhwal in 1957. His search for a stable livelihood finally ended successfully when he got a government job with the telecom department. Rahi lived in a rented house in the Shakarpur locality of Delhi for 40 years. An anecdote told by his family is that Rahi chose to invest the little finances that he had on recording Uttarakhandi folk music, rather than an investing in a house.

Rahi died on 10 January 2016 in Sir Ganga Ram Hospital in Delhi at the age of 73. He was survived by his wife, Sudha Negi, four sons (Virendra Negi, Mahendra Negi, Satish Negi, and Rakesh Bhardwaj), and a daughter (Nidhi Thakur). His entire family is involved in the field of music, including singing, composing, playing musical instruments, production, and direction of music. Rahi is said to have passed on the bulk of his learning to his eldest son, Virendra Negi, who had worked with his father as a musician and singer since childhood. Rahi's youngest son, Rakesh Bhardwaj, a rhythmist in the Indian rock-pop band Euphoria, paid tribute to his late father's legacy by remaking and releasing Rahi's popular Uttarakhandi songs online through his music company, Pahadi Soul.

== Tributes, legacy, and influence ==
Rahi is remembered for having lived for his art and for the community at large.

He could sing, write, compose, and play many rare Uttarakhand instruments. He continuously researched, represented, and explained the musical culture of Uttarakhand to his listeners. Rahi was known for his knowledge of the folklore of all of Uttarakhand, from Jaunsar to the Johar Valley.

In his later years, he would openly express his frustration with the "Bollywoodisation" and "VCD culture" of Indian folk music. Rahi was also deeply afflicted by the loss of prestige for languages like Garhwali, Jaunsari, Bhotiya, and Kumaoni in the minds of their speakers, which signified to him the slow death of Uttarakhand's unique Pahari culture. He was also critical of the lack of cultural policy of successive Uttarakhand state governments. He was concerned with the large-scale out-migration from Uttarakhand, which he tried to address through his 1980s song "Apni thaati ma tu laut ke aija". Rahi believed that conserving folk music would help in conservation of Uttarakhand's languages and culture.

Rahi continued giving demonstration lectures across the country, especially to Garhwali and Kumaoni students, to popularise and share his knowledge of the traditional folk forms and the culture that they represented.

Popular Garhwali folk singer Narendra Singh Negi has cited Chander Singh Rahi as his inspiration.

"Rahi ji's demise has created an irreplaceable void in the music and culture horizon of Uttarakhand. He was almost singlehandedly responsible for restoring and curating hundreds of centuries old folk songs of the hill state."

- Veteran Garhwali folk singer Narendra Singh Negi

— Hindustan Times, Lucknow

It was reported that jagar singer and Padma Shri recipient Pritam Bhartwan said that Rahdi had been blessed with a unique ringing melodious voice that would cast a magical spell over his listeners, while remembering the legacy of Chandra Singh Rahi on his demise.

Rahi's songs are still popular amongst the people of Uttarakhand. Three of his celebrated songs – "Fyonladiya"(2016), the traditional anchari jaagar, "Chaita ki Chaitwali"(2018) and "Fwa Baga Re"(2019) – were covered by popular Garhwali/Kumaoni singers Kishan Mahipal, Amit Saagar and Pappu Karki respectively. The new version of "Chaita ki Chaitwali" became the first Uttarakhandi song to reach five million views on YouTube.

In 2015, Sangeet Natak Akademi (The National Academy for Music, Dance and Drama) presented a "Screening of Folk Music of Garhwal by Chandra Singh Rahi and Party" in its Sanchayan Series, an annual screening of the Academy's archival films and video recordings.

Writer Charu Tiwari has written a book called Lok ka Chitera to mark 50 years of Rahi's musical journey.

Every year on Rahi's death anniversary, his family and admirers organise a remembrance event in Delhi, in which his musical repertoire is presented by his family members and by popular singers from Uttarakhand. His children and grandchildren represent Rahi's musical and cultural lineage and style under the "Rahi Gharana"

== Awards and recognition ==
- Mohan Upreti Lok Sanskriti Kala Samman
- Dr. Shivanand Nautiyal Smriti Puraskar
- Garh Bharati, Garhwal Sabha Samman Patra (1995)
- Monal Sanstha, Lucknow Samman Patra
