= Music of Uttarakhand =

Overview of music traditions in Uttarakhand, India

Folk music in Uttarakhand refers to the traditional and contemporary songs of Kumaon and Garhwal regions in the foothills of Himalayas. The songs reflect the state's cultural heritage and the lifestyle of its inhabitants in the Himalayas. Common themes in this music include the natural beauty of the region, seasonal changes, festivals, religious traditions, cultural practices, folk tales, historical figures, ancestral bravery, and love ballads.

Dhol damau, Turri, ransingha, dholki, daur, thali, bhankora and mashakbaja are a few among a variety of instruments used in this state. In recent years, Global musical instruments have been incorporated in popular folk songs by singers like Gajendra Rana and Narendra Singh Negi. This has allowed artists to create a sound that is catered to a large audience while maintaining the essence of traditional Uttarakhandi folk music.

== Prominent folk artists of Uttarakhand ==
- Mohan Upreti (1928-1997): A famous folk-singer from Kumaon, Mohan Upreti is known for Rajula Malushahi Ballad. His iconic Kumaoni song Bedu Pako Baro Masa isreferred to as the cultural anthem of Uttarakhand. This song gained widespread recognition and is said to have been a favorite of former Indian Prime Minister Jawaharlal Nehru and is also the official regimental song of the Kumaon Regiment of the Indian Army.
- Narendra Singh Negi (1949-present): Negi has sung various folk styles in Uttarakhand be it Jagar, Chaumasa, Thadya, or Playback. He has sung over 1000 songs in different local languages like Garhwali and Jaunsari. He is also a recipient of Sangeet Natak Akademi Award.
- Chander Singh Rahi: Fondly called the “Bhishma Pitamaha of Uttarakhand folk music” for his deep devotion to the music of Uttarakhand curated more than 2500 folk songs from Uttarakhand and gave his voice to more than 500 songs of Garhwali and Kumaoni language. He was also the first singer to sing a ghazal in Garhwali language known as Teri Mukhiri'.
- Meena Rana, Jeet Singh Negi, Girish Tiwari 'Girda', Pritam Bhartwan are also notable folk singers of this region.

Rising young talents of Uttarakhand include Jubin Nautiyal and B. K. Samant.

== Traditional music instruments of Uttarakhand ==
- Dhol: This is a drum in which a wooden or brass hollow is covered with leather at both ends.

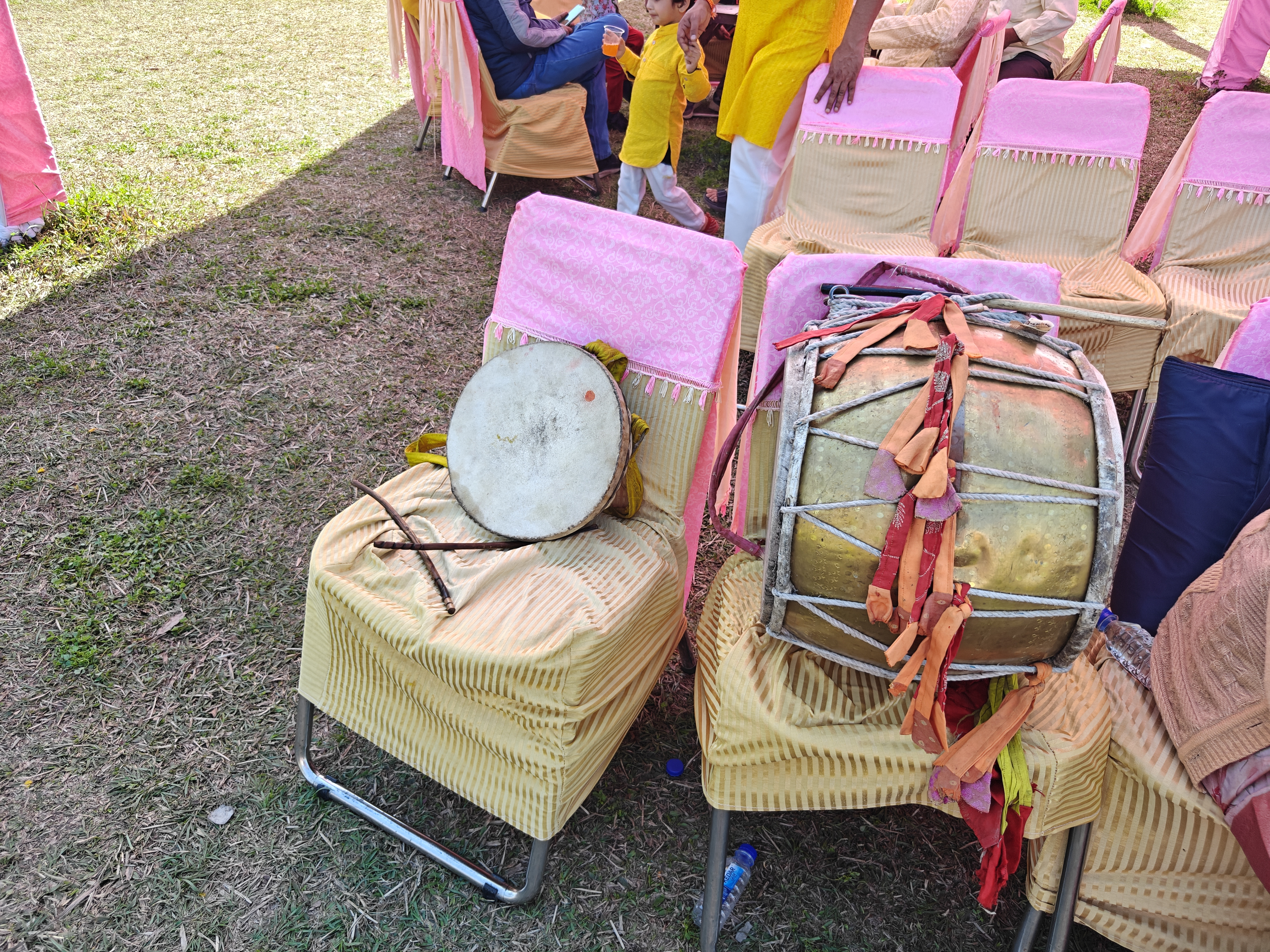
Dhol-Damau at wedding

- Damau: This percussion instrument consists of two leathered brass cones of different sizes. The larger one is called 'Daindama' and the smaller one 'Baundamu' - both producing distinct sounds.
- Hurka: Hurka, also known as Hudka, is an instrument which is shaped like a Damru, a musical instrument associated with Lord Shiva.
- Turturi or turhi: Turhi is a wind instrument made of bronze and brass.

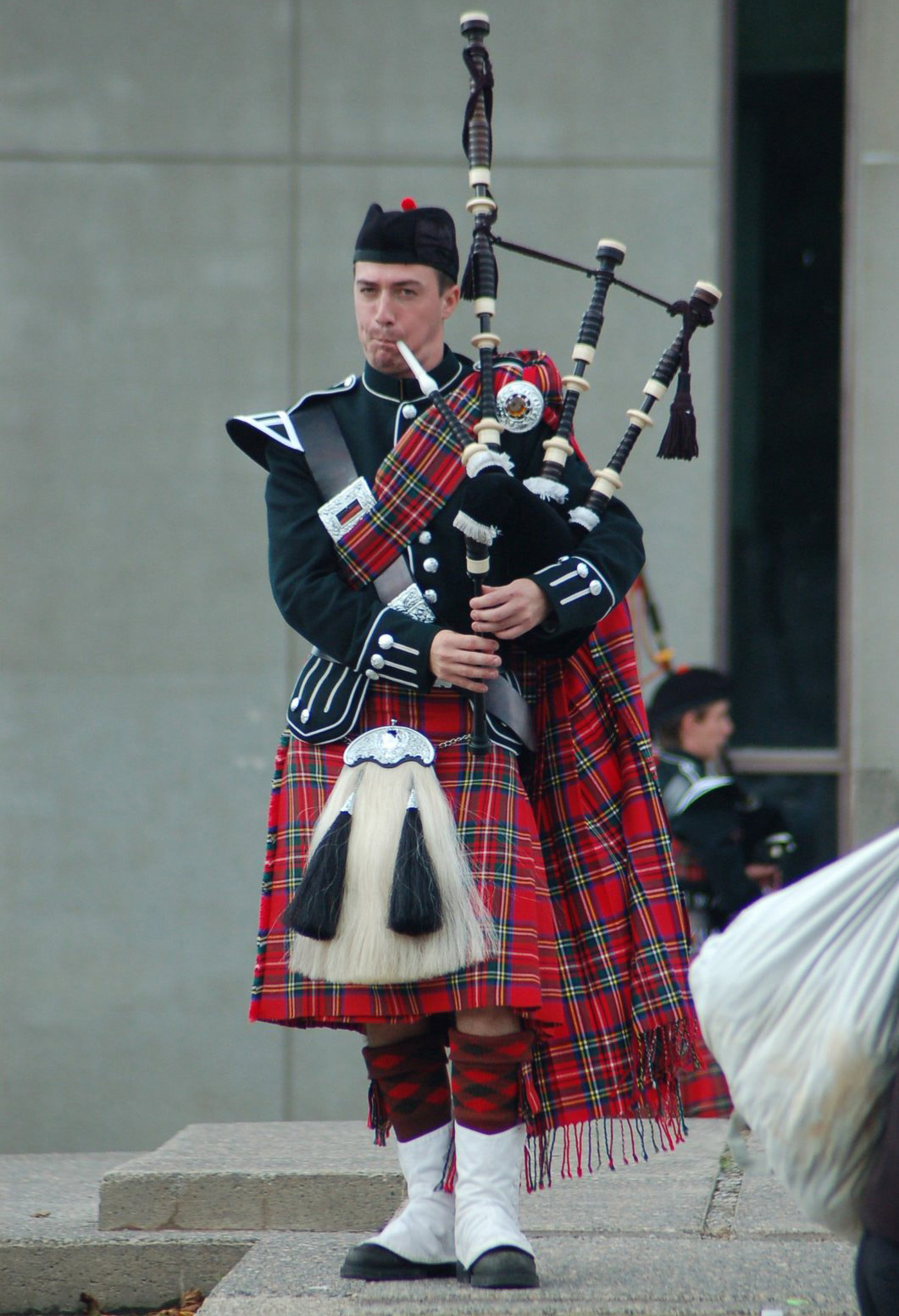
QueensBandsPiper

- Mushak Been or Bagpiper: The mashak (also known as mushak baja, masak, mishek, meshek, moshug, moshaq, moshuq, mashak bin, bin baji) is similar to a bagpipe.
- Nagfini: It is a traditional wind instrument belonging to the Kumaon region in Uttarakhand.
- Bansuri/Murali: The bansuri is revered as Lord Krishna's divine instrument and is often associated with Krishna's Rasa lila dance- akin to a flute.

== Significance of music in Pahari Culture ==
Live music plays a key role in traditional dance forms, including Pandav Lila (Garhwal) and Chapeli (Kumaon), which are performed primarily during festivals . While the dancers are performing, they are accompanied by musicians playing traditional instruments such as the dhol, damau, and turri. The presence of live music during festivals and community gatherings helps preserve the storytelling aspects embedded within the dances. Garhwal and Kumaon, the two regions in Uttarakhand, primarily differ in their lyrical texture and musicality. Kumaoni music tends to be more upbeat and are based on stories (folk music) whereas Garhwali music are romantic ballads and devotional songs. The presence of live music during festivals and community gatherings helps preserve the folklore embedded within the dances.

=== Garhwali music ===
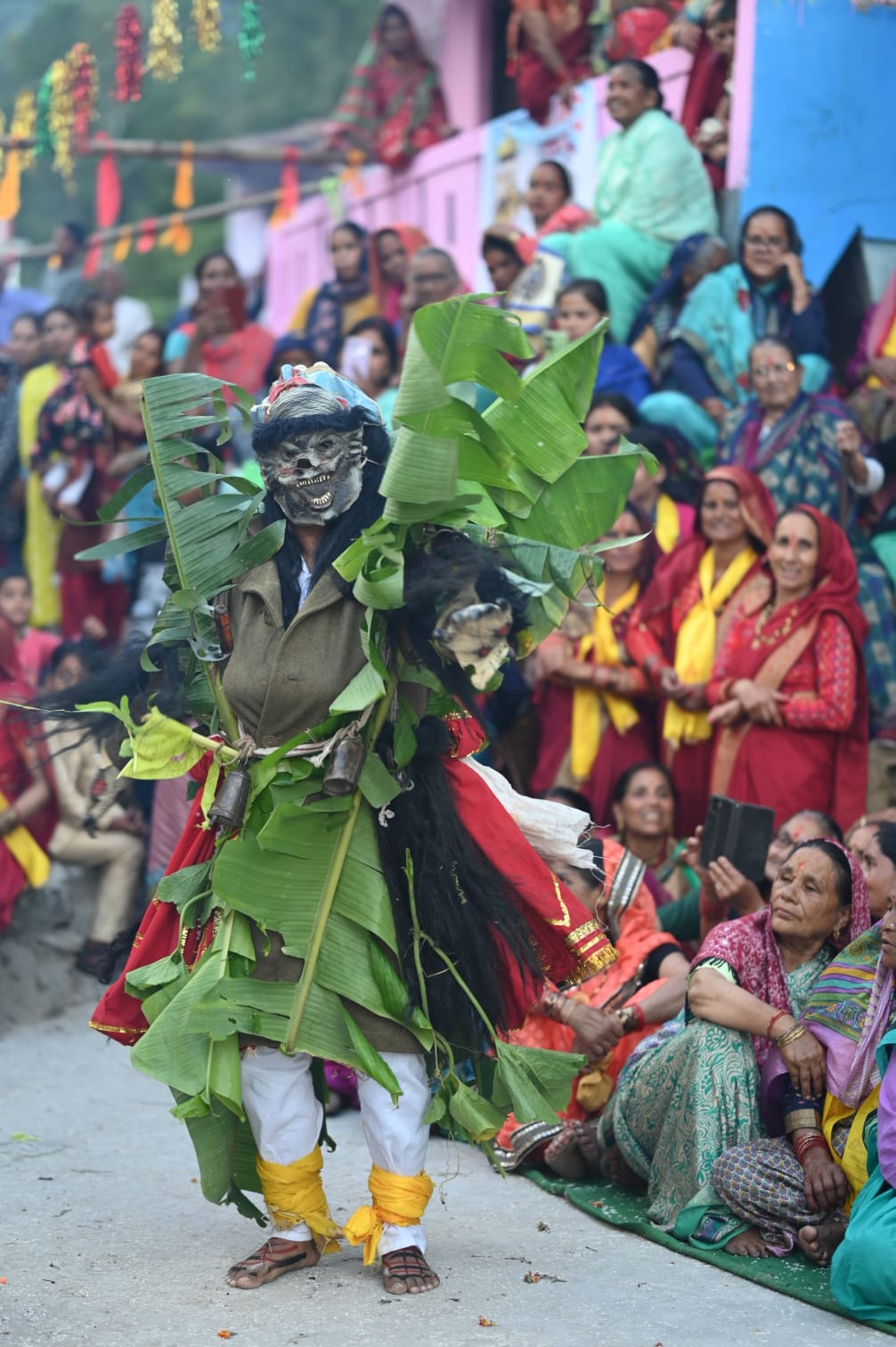
Pandav lila Performance

An essential element of Garhwali music is its focus on migration, as several move to cities for work, focusing on the sense of separation from their family and roots. Garhwali folk singer, Narendra Singh Negi, has been instrumental in popularizing this music across borders. His songs like Jai Durge Durga Bhawani portray the life, culture, and concerns of the people of this region. Traditionally, the main theme of this music revolves around devotional folk music such as "Ramola" - sung in the praise of Lord Rama and accompanied by the dance like “Thali” wherein performers use metal plates and spoons to create the rhythm. "Pandav Lila" is based on the stories of the major Indian epic - Mahabharata. In today’s time, the music is heard beyond this region as there is an influence of this music in hindi film music - making it akin to the genre “pop-folk” . Characteristics of this style of music include a high vocal range, free rhythm cadenzas using a bamboo flute (bansuri), rhythmical cycles in six (dādra and khemtā) or eight (kaherva), and instrumentation of dholak and tabla (instead of drums in pop music) as the pulse or core of the song.

=== Kumaoni Music ===
The themes of Kumaoni songs often reflect agricultural practices, festivals and love, with the beat to be celebratory, making it a key addition to Kumaoni festivals and community events. Harela, a hindu festival that marks the beginning of monsoon is one such festival wherein musicians and dancers come together to perform in their community. Kumaoni singers have also represented their culture through a global platform by performing at Coke Studio.The song "Sonchadi," (son- gold, chadi- small bird), blends contemporary music but is deeply rooted in traditional folklore of Rajula Malushahi. This modern adaptation was composed and arranged by digV (Digvijay Singh Pariyar) and performed collaboratively by Neha Kakkar, digV, and Kamla Devi (a seasoned folk singer from Kumaon). By integrating Kumaoni music influence with Hindi musical elements, the team aimed to pay a tribute to Uttarakhand's traditions while making the music accessible to a broader audience. There were regional instruments such as "kansa thali" and traditional wear like Pichhaura which was worn by Kamla Devi to honor the culture of Kumaon and bring the music on a global platform.
