= Joshi =

Origin
- Language: Sanskrit
- Origin: South Asia
- Derivation: Jyotisa
- Meaning: Astrologer

Other names
- Variant forms: Josi, Jyoshi, Joshee
- See also: Bhatt, Pathak, Pandey, Tripathi, Upreti, Tiwari, Jyotishi

Joshi is a surname used by the Brahmin (caste) in India and Nepal. Joshi is also sometimes spelled as Jyoshi.

Joshi is a common family name in Delhi, Gujarat, Karnataka, Madhya Pradesh, Maharashtra, Odisha, Haryana, Punjab, Rajasthan, Uttarakhand, Goa and Uttar Pradesh in India.

== Notable individuals ==
List of people with Joshi surname, who may or may not be associated with the Brahmin caste.

=== Politicians, civil servants, and military ===
- Alok Joshi, Indian police officer and intelligence agency chief
- A. C. Joshi (1908–1971), Indian botanist and Civil Service officer
- Banwari Lal Joshi (1936–2017), Indian civil servant and state governor
- Bhanu Bhakta Joshi, Nepalese politician
- Bhojraj Joshi, Nepalese politician
- B.C. Joshi (1935–1994), Chief of the Indian Army
- C. P. Joshi, Indian politician (Indian National Congress), former Union Minister for Road Transport and Highways, Govt. of India
- Devendra Kumar Joshi, Chief of Naval Staff of the Indian Navy
- Govinda Raj Joshi, Nepalese politician (Nepali Congress) and former Minister
- Hari Dev Joshi, 11th, 16th and 18th chief minister Of Rajasthan
- Hora Prasad Joshi, Nepalese politician
- Manohar Joshi, 12th chief minister of Maharashtra
- Murli Manohar Joshi, Indian politician (Bharatiya Janta Party), chairman, Public Accounts Committee of the parliament
- Nabindra Raj Joshi, Nepali politician
- Pralhad Joshi, Indian politician (BJP)
- Puran Chand Joshi, Indian communist leader
- Rita Bahuguna Joshi, Indian politician (BJP)
- Sharad Anantrao Joshi, Indian agricultural activist and politician
- Suresh Joshi (RSS) (born 1947), former Sarkaryavah of the Rashtriya Swayamsevak Sangh, a right-wing Hindutva paramilitary organisation
- Yogesh Kumar Joshi, Indian army, Chief of staff of Northern army command

=== Writers, educators, and scholars ===
- Anandi Gopal Joshi (1865–1887), first Indian woman to be awarded a western medicine degree
- Angur Baba Joshi (1932–2020), Nepalese scholar, first female School Principal of Nepal
- Anil R. Joshi (1940–2025), Gujarati-language poet and essayist
- Anupam Joshi, American cybersecurity expert and Professor and Chair of Computer Science and Electrical Engineering at the University of Maryland
- Aravind Joshi, Professor of Computer and Cognitive Science at the University of Pennsylvania
- Arun Joshi, Indian novelist
- Chintaman Vinayak Joshi, Marathi humorist, author of "Chimanrao" series of books
- Girija Prasad Joshi, Nepalese Newari language writer
- Indra Joshi, British physician
- Lakshman Shastri Joshi, Indian scholar of Sanskrit, Hindu Dharma, and a Marathi literary critic
- Mahadevshastri Joshi, Marathi writer
- Mangal Raj Joshi, Nepalese royal astrologer
- Manohar Shyam Joshi, post-modern Hindi writer and Father of Indian soap operas
- Prasoon Joshi, Hindi lyricist
- Prem Lal Joshi, Indian research scholar of Accounting and writer
- Ramlal Joshi, Nepalese author and writer
- Ruchir Joshi, author and filmmaker
- S. T. Joshi, Indian-American editor, critic, and scholar
- Satya Mohan Joshi (1920–2022), Nepalese author and writer, first recipient of Madan Puraskar
- Sharad Joshi, Hindi writer and satirist, Padma Shri awardee
- Shashank R. Joshi, Indian endocrinologist, diabetologist and medical researcher
- Shekhar Joshi, Hindi author
- Shukraraj Shastri (born Shukra Raj Joshi), Nepalese author, social reformer and political martyr
- Suresh Joshi, Gujarati poet, writer and literary critic
- Sushma Joshi, Nepalese writer and filmmaker
- Umashankar Joshi, Gujarati poet

=== Artists and performers ===
- Aashirman DS Joshi, Nepalese actor
- Anshuman Joshi, Marathi actor
- Ayushman Joshi, Nepalese actor
- Bhimsen Joshi, Bharat Ratna, vocalist of Hindustani classical music
- Chetan Joshi, flautist
- Damayanti Joshi, Kathak dancer and guru
- Dev Joshi, Indian television actor
- Dilip Joshi (born 1969), Hindi and Gujarati actor
- Gajananrao Joshi, violinist and vocalist Hindustani classical music
- Gayatri Joshi, Indian Actress
- Gulki Joshi (born 1980), Indian television actress
- Hardeek Joshi Indian television actor
- Indira Joshi, British Indian actor
- Indira Joshi, Nepali singer and model
- Jitendra Joshi , Marathi Actor
- Malina Joshi, Nepali beauty pageant and model
- Manoj Joshi (born 1945), Gujarati, Marathi and Hindi Actor
- Manasi Joshi Roy (born 1968), Indian television actress
- Nivedita Joshi, Marathi actress
- Pallavi Joshi (born 1969), Indian Actress, winner of National award for the film Woh Chokri
- Poonam Joshi (born 23 October 1970), Indian television actress
- Prasoon Joshi (born September 1971), Indian lyricist
- Purbi Joshi (born 1974), Indian actress
- Rohan Joshi Indian Stand-up comedian, performer
- Santosh Joshi, vocalist of Hindustani classical music
- Sharman Joshi (born 1979), Bollywood actor
- Shikha Joshi (1976–2015), Indian actress who committed suicide
- Shivangi Joshi (born 1998), Indian television actress
- Spruha Joshi, Marathi actress
- Swwapnil Joshi (born 1977), Marathi actor
- Tulip Joshi, Indian Actress, model
- V Joshi, (AKA Joshiy) Indian director known for his Malayalam films
- Vinayak Joshi, Kannada actor

=== Sports ===
- Aniruddha Joshi (born 1987), Indian cricketer
- C. G. Joshi (born 1931), Indian cricketer
- Harshvardhan Joshi, Indian mountaineer
- Naresh Joshi, Nepalese football
- Sunil Joshi, cricketer who played for India national cricket team as a left arm spinner in one day internationals and test match cricket
- Sunil Lal Joshi, Nepali Olympic weightlifter
- Uday Joshi, Indian cricketer who played for Sussex County Cricket Club

=== Social service ===
- Narayan Malhar Joshi, Indian trade union leader and founder of the Social service league
- Nirmala Joshi, Nepalese Catholic sister, former head at Missionaries of Charity
