= Uttarakhandi =

Uttarakhandi may refer to:

- the people and culture of the Indian state of Uttarakhand
  - Uttarakhandi cuisine
  - Uttarakhandi music
  - List of people from Uttarakhand
  - Bhotiyas of Uttarakhand
- Uttarakhandi languages, the Indo-Aryan languages spoken in the state
