= Suberau Gham =

- Directed by: Naresh Khanna
- Written by: Urmi Negi
- Produced by: Urmi Negi
- Edited by: Sushil Gotankar
- Production company: Snowy Mountain Production
- Release date: 26 December 2014
- Running time: 172 minutes
- Country: India
- Language: Garhwali

Suberau Gham (IPA:sʊbeɾɔ gʰə:m; Garhwali: सुबेरौ घाम; English: The Morning Sunlight) is a Garhwali film directed by Naresh Khanna and produced by Urmi Negi. The film features Urmi Negi, Balraj Negi, Baldev Rana, and Ghananand in the lead roles. The film is against the consumption of alcohol, and the dangers of alcoholism.

== Cast ==
- Urmi Negi
- Balraj Negi
- Baldev Rana
- Ghananand
- Mir Ranjan Negi
- Bijju as himself

== Soundtrack ==
#	Title	Singer(s)
1	"Jai Mata Bhawani"	Narendra Singh Negi and Anuradha Nirala
2	"Teri Karali Nazar"	Narendra Singh Negi
3	"Hita Didyaun"	Anuradha Nirala
4	"Hey Bala Bijija Re"	Anuradha Nirala

== See also ==
- Jagwal, first Garhwali movie made in 1981 by Parasar Gaur
