= Hema Negi Karasi =

Indian singer

- Genres: Garhwali folk, Jagar, Mangal geet
- Occupations: Singer, record producer

Hema Negi Karasi (born 5 April 1984) is an Indian folk singer from Uttarakhand who performs in the Garhwali language. She is known for singing jagar (ritual invocation songs), maangal (auspicious songs sung at weddings),and other Garhwali folk forms. In 2026 the Sangeet Natak Akademi announced her as a recipient of the Ustad Bismillah Khan Yuva Puraskar for 2024 in the field of music.

== Early life ==
Karasi was born in Tukhinda village in Rudraprayag district, Uttarakhand. Accounts of her life state that she was introduced to folk music by her mother and grew up hearing mangal songs and jagar. She is reported to have performed publicly for the first time at a school function in Kandai in 2003. She later attended Hemwati Nandan Bahuguna Garhwal University.
