= Upreti =

Indian and Nepalese family name

Upreti / Uprety
- Pronunciation: /ʌpˈrɛtiː/ UP-reh-TEE; Hindi pronunciation: [ʊp'reːt̪iː]

Origin
- Meaning: Someone from the village Uprara; Fom Sanskrit uparati, meaning "cessation from worldly pleasure"
- Region of origin: Pithoragarh district, Uttarakhand, India

Other names
- See also: Acharya, Joshi, Pant, Sharma, Upadhyay

Upreti or Upraiti (ISO: Upretī), sometimes spelled as Uprety, is a surname found among the Brahmins of Uttarakhand, India and the Bahuns in Nepal. It derives from the Uprara village in Pithoragarh district of Uttarakhand. An alternative etymology derives it from "uparati" in Sanskrit, meaning someone who has renounced worldy pleasure.

== Notable people with Upreti as a surname ==
- Almoda Rana Uprety; Nepalese singer and musician
- Arun Kumar Upreti; Indian politician
- Benoy Upreti; Indian cricketer
- Bharat Raj Upreti; former judge of the Supreme Court of Nepal
- Bishal Nath Upreti; Nepalese academic
- Dalip Kumar Upreti; Indian lichenologist
- Hari Prasad Upreti; Nepalese politician
- Kharananda Upreti; Indian politician
- Kul Prasad Uprety; Nepalese politician
- Melissa Upreti; Nepalese lawyer and human rights expert
- Mohan Upreti; Indian playwright and theatre personality
- Nikhil Upreti; Nepalese actor
- Nilkantha Upreti; Former Chief Election Commissioner of Nepal
- Ramesh Upreti; Nepalese actor
- Sanjeev Uprety; Nepalese journalist
