= Dhol damau =

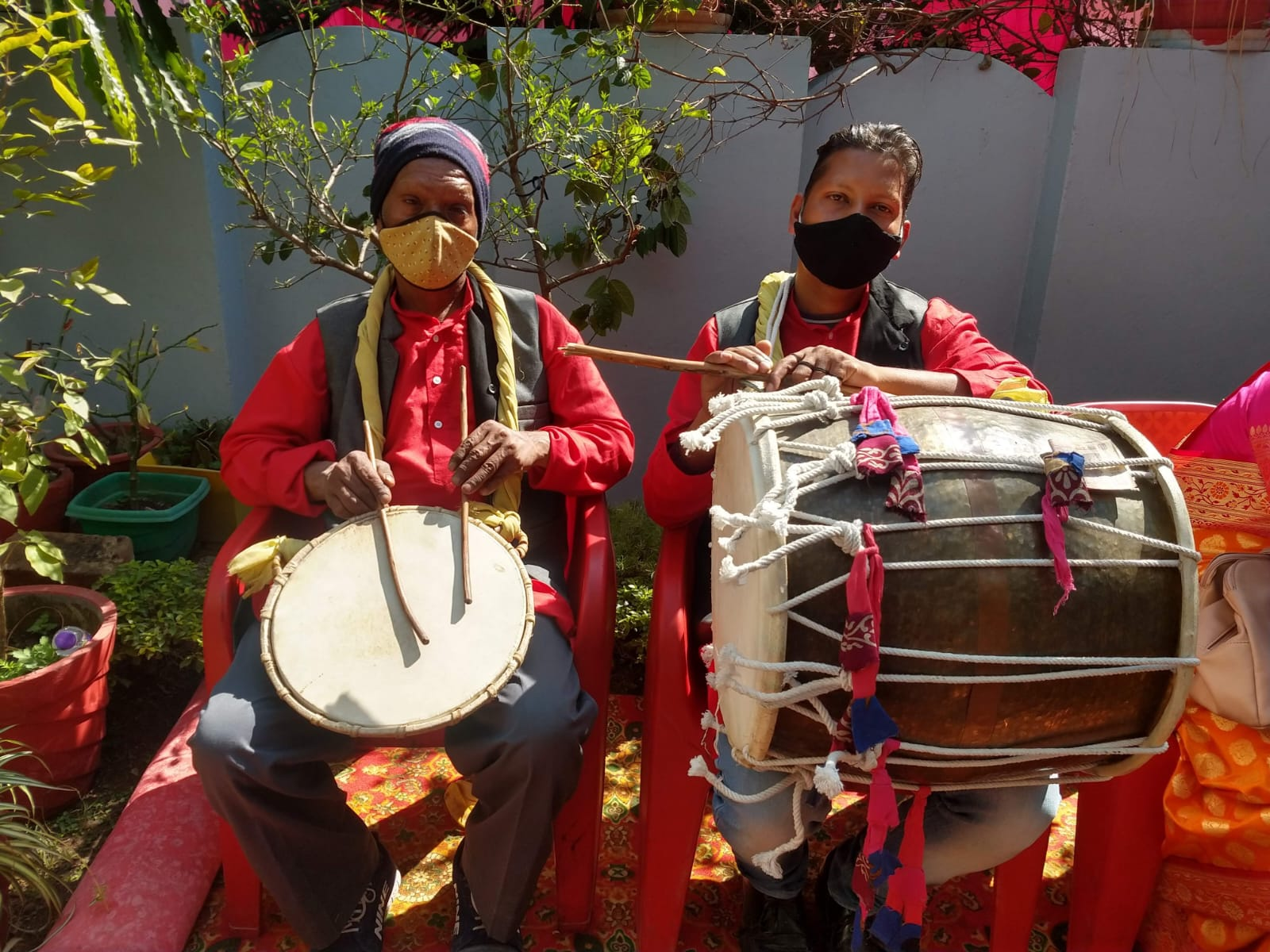
Dhol Damaun, Uttarakhand

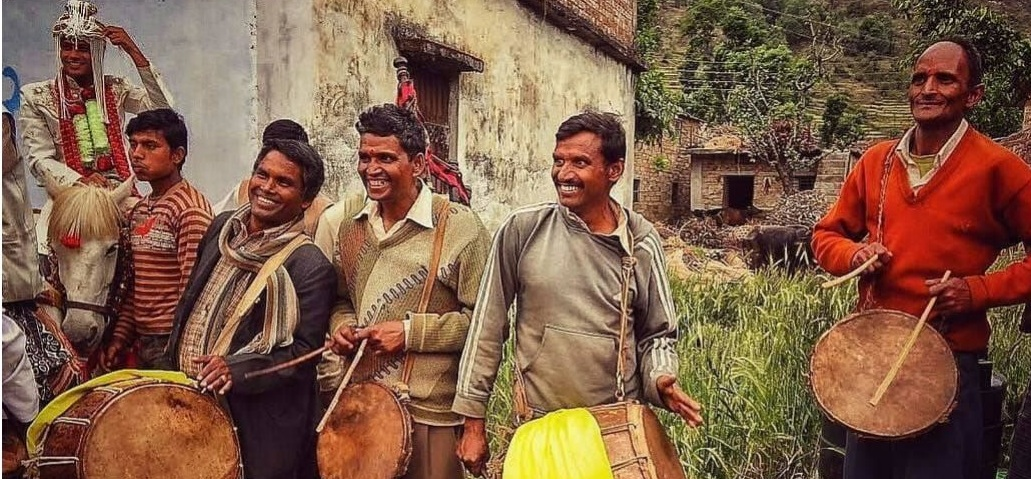

Dhol damau or dhol damaun is the term used to collectively refer to two folk instruments of Himachal Pradesh and Uttarakhand, the dhol and damau, which are almost always played together on special occasions; though they may be played separately. The two instruments play a vital role in the lives of villagers, who often live in remote valleys of the region, and every important event is accompanied by their playing, which is considered auspicious. They are played according to the ancient oral treatise of Dhol Sagar that lists specific rhythmic patterns for every occasion, from celebrating birth and christening to religious ceremonies, folk dramas like Pandav Lila, and death rituals. Traditionally, they have been played by specific caste groups like auji, bajgi, das or dholi .

== Notes ==
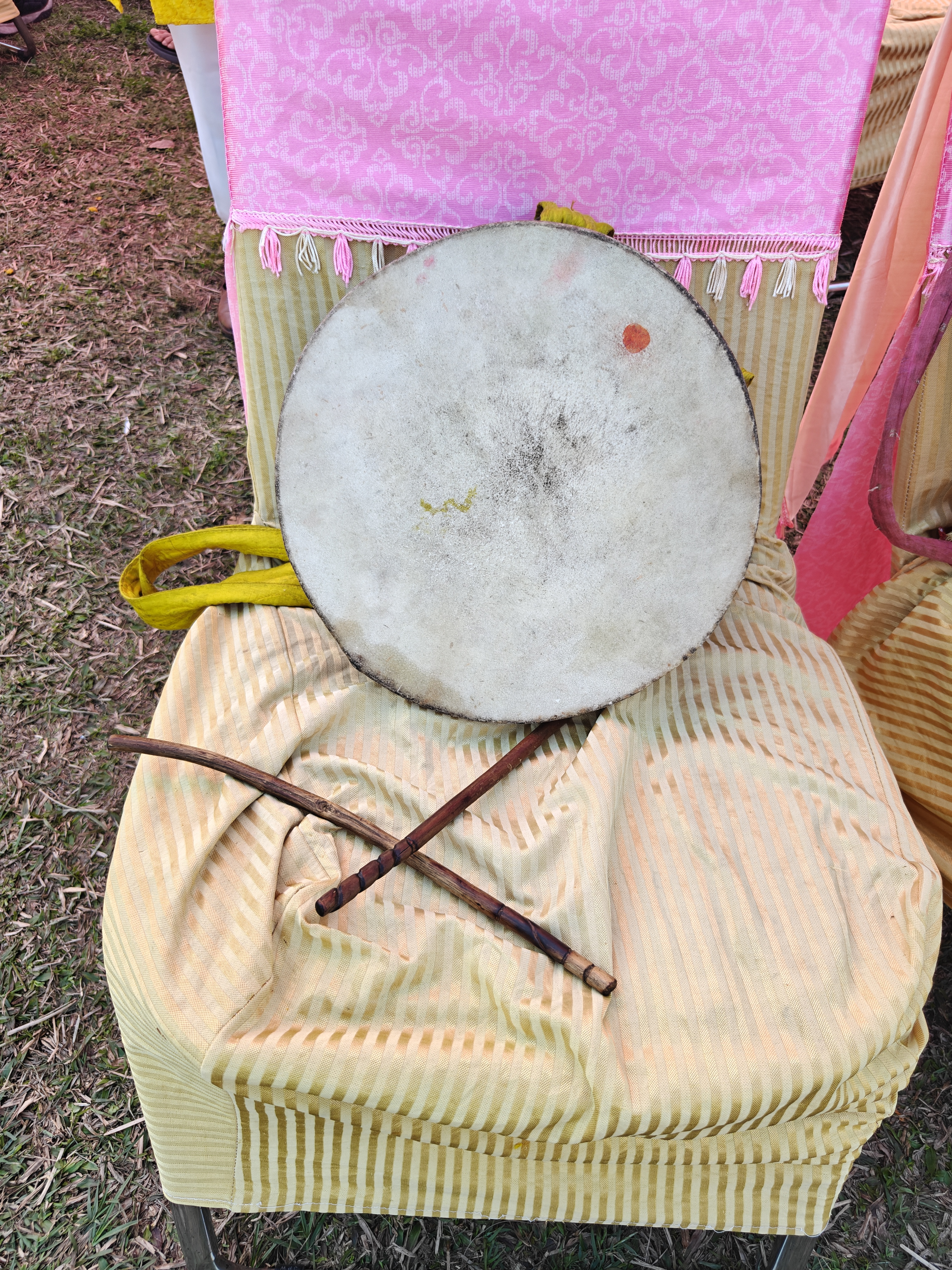
Damaun with sticks
