= Damaun =

Damaun may refer to:

- Damau, an Indian drum
- Daman and Diu, former union territory in Western India
- Roman Catholic Archdiocese of Goa and Daman
