= List of mangroves of Sri Lanka =

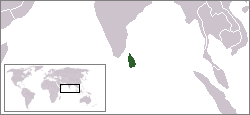
Location of Sri Lanka

The mangroves of Sri Lanka are a part of the diverse brackish water plant wildlife of Sri Lanka.

Mangroves are shrubs or small trees that usually grow in varied regions of tropical and subtropical coastal waters, where saline water and freshwater meet, creating brackish water. Mangroves are halophytes, which are adapted to harsh coastal life conditions. They contain a complex salt filtration system and complex root system to cope with salt water immersion and wave action. They are adapted to the low oxygen (anoxic) conditions of waterlogged mud.

The mangrove ecosystem or commonly mangal, is found at the river mouths bordering lagoons, estuaries, or on sheltered shores. Some of the most common adaptations of mangroves are as follows:

- They have prop roots which emerge from branches and stilt roots which emerge from the stem. Both types of roots help to anchor the plant and to filer salt.
- Some roots, known as pneumatophores, grow upwards from the soil. They have numerous apertures through which gases are exchanged. Some species have knee roots that perform this function.
- All mangroves show the germination process called vivipary. Because of the unfavorable conditions, the hypocotyl of the seed grows while it is still attached to the parent plant. When it is released, it either gets stuck in the mud or floats upright before it settles down.
- Mangrove plants show xeromorphic characteristics such as highly cutinized epidermis, extensive water storage tissues, and salt-excreting glands.

Mangrove swamps have several ecological functions. Mangroves tend to accumulate sediment. Fine particles trapped in the root systems become permanently deposited. They are also very productive communities, with an aquatic productivity and litter fall. Most of the plant material gradually decays and enriches the adjacent waters through detritus food chains. Thus mangrove ecosystems are called energy-subsidized ecosystems. They serve as nursery grounds for many marine fish and crustaceans. Mangrove timber is valuable since it contains tannins and is resistant to insect attacks. Mangrove clams and oysters are a source of lime and food, as well as fish and crustaceans.

Sri Lanka is an island with a great diversity of lagoons, and estuaries. There is a well-developed mangrove ecosystem throughout the coastal belt. About 28 species of true mangroves and 18 mangrove associates have been recorded and many of them are shrubs, shorter than 10 m. Most of the mangroves of Sri Lanka belong to the families Rhizophoraceae and Avicenniaceae. Mangrove associates are largely members of the family Acanthaceae.
