= Bedu Pako Baro Masa =

Kumaoni folk song

"Bedu Pako Baro Masa बेडु पाको बारो मासा"

Song
- Language: Kumaoni
- Published: 1952
- Genre: Uttarakhandi, Folk, Instrumental
- Songwriter: Brijendra Lal Shah
- Composers: Mohan Upreti and B. M. Shah

"Bedu Pako Baro Masa"

Single by Gopal Babu Goswami
- Label: His Master's Voice
- Songwriter: Brijendra Lal Shah
- This album is now lost.

Bedu Pako Baro Masa (English: Figs do ripen round the year) is a Kumaoni folk song in Kumaoni language which was composed by Mohan Upreti, B. M. Shah and written by Brijendra Lal Shah. This Kumaoni song was composed, written and first performed in the early 1950s and since has become popular all over Uttarakhand as even before it had been sung as a traditional folk song among the villagers in Kumaon. This song is the official regiment song of the Kumaon Regiment of Indian Army.

== Composition ==
Mohan Upreti composed this song in Raga Durga. It was sung on stage for the first time in 1952 at Government Inter College, Nainital. The song became popular when it was sung and was sung in Teen Murti Bhavan in the honour of an international gathering. Then Prime Minister of India, Jawaharlal Nehru, chose this song as the best folk song among other participants from India. and Mohan Upreti became popular as the Bedu Pako Boy. Mohan Upreti and Naima Khan Upreti also recorded this song for His Master's Voice. The His Master's Voice recording was given to the guests as a souvenir. This song was one of the Favourite song of first Prime Minister of India, Jawaharlal Nehru. Recently, in the honour of all who gave this folk song an international fame and to make Uttarakhand folk available all around the world 24X7, an online radio, which is one of the only and very first online radio of Uttarakhand available on web, was created by the name of Bedu Pako.

== Lyrics ==
Kumaoni

बेडु पाको बारो मासा–(२) नरणा! काफल पाको चैत मेरी छैला
बेडु पाको बारो मासा–(२), ओ नरण! काफल पाको चैत मेरी छैला–(२)

रूणा-भूणा दीन आयो–(२) नरैण को जां मेरो मैता मेरी छैला
बेडु पाको बारो मासा–(२), ओ नरण! काफल पाको चैत मेरी छैला–(२)

आप खाँछे पन-सुपारी–(२), नरणा! मैं भी लूँछ बीड़ी मेरी छैला
बेडु पाको बारो मासा–(२), ओ नरण! काफल पाको चैत मेरी छैला–(२)

अल्मोड़ा की नन्दा देवी–(२), नरणा! फुल छदुनी पात मेरी छैला
बेडु पाको बारो मासा–(२), ओ नरण! काफल पाको चैत मेरी छैला–(२)

त्यार खुटामा काँटो बुड्या–(२), नरणा! मेरी खुटी पीड़ा मेरी छैला
बेडु पाको बारो मासा–(२), ओ नरण! काफल पाको चैत मेरी छैला–(२)

अल्मोड़ा को लल्ल बजार–(२), नरैणा पाथर की सीढ़ी मेरी छैला
बेडु पाको बारो मासा–(२), ओ नरण! काफल पाको चैत मेरी छैला–(२)

ISO 15919 transliteration

Beḍu pāko bāro māsā–(2) Naraṇā! Kāphala pāko caita merī chailā
Beḍu pāko bāro māsā–(2), O Naraṇa! Kāphala pāko caita merī chailā–(2)

Ruṇa-bhuṇa dīna āyo–(2) Naraṇā! Ko jaa myro maita meri chailā
Beḍu pāko bāro māsā–(2), O Naraṇa! Kāphala pāko caita merī chailā–(2)

Āpa khām̐che pana-supārī–(2), Naraṇā! Maiṁ bhī lūm̐cha bīṛī merī chailā
Beḍu pāko bāromāsā–(2), O Naraṇa! Kāphala pāko caita merī chailā–(2)

Almoṛā kī Nandā Devī–(2), Naraṇā! Phula chadunī pāta merī chailā
Beḍu pāko bāro māsā–(2), O Naraṇa! Kāphala pāko caita merī chailā–(2)

Tyāra khuṭāmā kām̐ṭo buḍyā–(2), Naraṇā! Merī khuṭī pīṛā merī chailā
Beḍu pāko bāro māsā–(2), O Naraṇa! Kāphala pāko caita merī chailā–(2)

Almoṛā ko Lalla Bajāra–(2), Naraṇā! Lalla maṭā kī sīṛhī merī chailā
Beḍu pāko bāro māsā–(2), O Naraṇa! Kāphala pāko caita merī chailā–(2)

English translation

Figs (bedu) do ripen round the year, my dear Narayan!
But the bayberry (kaphal) ripes only in the month of chaitra (March/April).

Those lovely days (of spring) are here, my dear Narayan!
Please take me home to my parents.

You're fond of paan-suparis, my dear Narayan!
Me too, like to smoke beedis.

At the shrine of Nanda Devi in Almora, my dear Narayan!
People do offer flowers and foliage.

If a thorn pierces your foot, my dear Narayan!
I sense the pain in mine.

The Lal Bazaar of Almora, my dear Narayan!
Has stairs of red soil (geru).

== Theme of the song ==
The theme of the refrain is symbolic. The fig fruit which ripens round the year is not valued much but the deliciously sweet bayberry only appears briefly during the short season in March and April. Thus it is something to look forward to in the midst of an ordinary existence. In a state typified by mountainous terrain the warmth of spring and summer brings a promising bounty of flowers and berries and gladdens the heart.

The verses of the song has many themes. Primarily a woman is expressing her feelings to her husband called Narayan. She lives with her in-laws and the advent of spring kindles in her a desire to return to her parents' home where she was lovingly nurtured as a child. Filled with nostalgia, she recalls the visits to the holy Nanda Devi shrine and Lal Bazaar in the town of Almora.

One of the verses describes her bond with Narayan. Her love for him is so deep that she feels his pain unwittingly. In another verse she rues the fact that at her in-laws’ she has to settle for things of lesser value while others enjoy the good life, a reminder of how she was pampered as a child but had to settle for a dreary married life. It emphasises her longing to visit her parental home where she knows she will be fussed over.

== Description ==
In this song composer expresses the emotions of a woman giving reasons her beloved husband to visit her mother's place. 'Bedu', the fig, is one of the very abundant fruit available throughout four seasons, however the 'Kaphal' (wild red-coloured bayberry) is available only in the month of Chaitra. In general, 'Bedu' fruit has only a limited value be it eating or other usages among Kumaoni people, hence not considered as a fruit at all. However 'Kaphal' not only tastes good but also it happens to ripen around the month when natural beauty touches its extreme. This entire natural beauty instigates childhood memories and fun days within her heart and she expresses her interest of going to her mother's place. Also to add to the meaning composer included places like Almora and Nainital in the songs and the famous things therein. In one of the lines composer provides us with the powerful bond of love and explains that if beloved is hurt it is the self who realizes and feels the pain more than anyone else around.

== In popular culture ==
This song is the official regiment song of the Kumaon Regiment of Indian Army. The Kumaon Regiment has its headquarter at Ranikhet, Almora district.

The song also serves as the cultural anthem for the Kumaoni people worldwide.

== See also ==
- Kumaoni language
- Ficus palmata (Bedu)
- Myrica esculenta (Kaphal)
- Music of Uttarakhand
- Uttarakhand Devabhumi Matribhumi
