= Narendra Singh Negi =

Indian singer (born 1949)

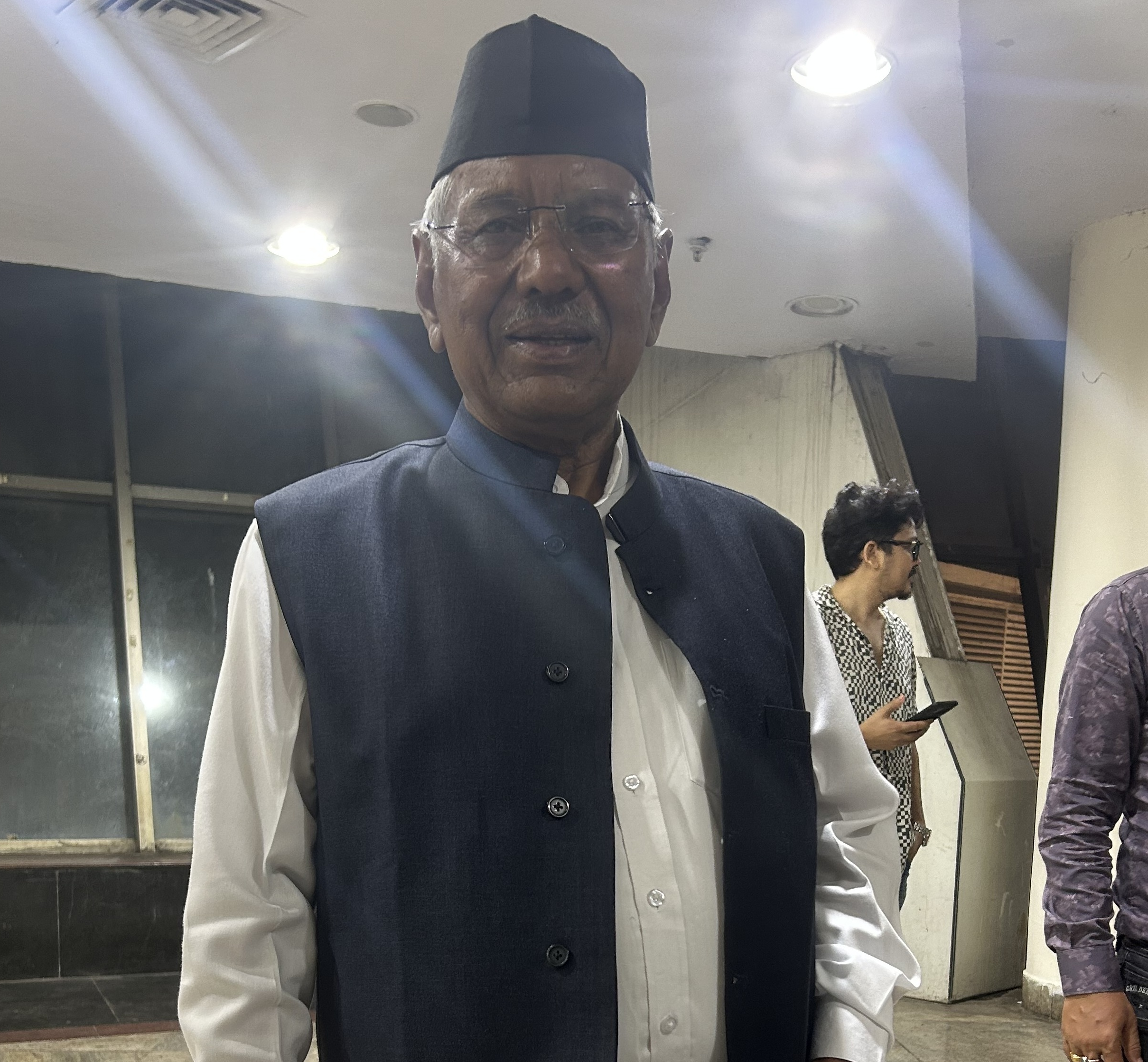
- During Yuca Awards Program

Background information
- Born: 12 August 1949 (age 77); Pauri, Uttar Pradesh, India (now Uttarakhand, India)
- Occupations: Folk singer, composer
- Labels: T-Series; Himalayan Films; Rama Cassettes
- Spouse: Usha Negi

Narendra Singh Negi (born 12 August 1949), also referred as 'Garh Ratna'. he is one of the most prominent folk singer, composer and a poet of the Garhwal and Uttarakhand who prominently sings in Garhwali language. Reportedly, he has sung more than 1000 songs. His unparalleled work in the field of folk music of Uttarakhand is an inspiration for all the upcoming singers of Uttarakhand.

== Background ==
Negi ji was born in Pauri town in Pauri Garhwal District (Uttarakhand) where he also completed his schooling. He is married to Usha Negi. His father was a Naib Subedar in the Indian army. For graduation he moved to Rampur with his cousin Ajit Singh Negi who taught him Tabla. From his childhood he was fond of listening to traditional folk singers in various cultural events. He wrote and composed his first song in 1974 after getting inspired by the hard work done by his mother and other women of the town.

== Music career ==
Negi recorded his first self-composed song in 1974. In 1976, Negi released his first music album "Garhwali Geetmala." These Geetmalas were in 10 different parts. As these Garhwali Geetmalas were from different companies he was finding it difficult to manage them. So he finally switched to releasing his cassettes by giving them separate titles. His first album came with the title called "Burans".

Negi is credited for introducing main melodic phrases of 12 beats and an irregular four-beat rhythmic pattern (typical of the Jaunsari region) to contemporary songs. He has written songs on love, sorrow, historic events, social, political and environment issue. He has sung in every genre of singing popular in Uttarakhand like "Jagar", "Mangal", "Basanti", "Khuder", "Chhopati", Chounphula and Jhumeila. He has sung in different local languages like Garhwali, Kumaoni, Jaunsari prevailing in the state.

He has also given his voice in Garhwali movies such as Chakrachal, Gharjawai, and Meri Ganga Holi Ta Maima Aali. Bollywood singers including Udit Narayan, Lata Mangeshkar, Asha Bhonsle, Poornima, Suresh Wadkar, Anuradha Paudwal, Jaspal also sang in Garhwali films under his music direction. He also sang with fellow Garhwali enthusiast Madhuri Barthwal.

== Awards ==
=== Sangeet Natak Akademi 2022 ===
Narendra Singh Negi has been awarded the Sangeet Natak Akademi Award in Delhi on 9 April 2022. Chief Minister Pushkar Singh Dhami has congratulated the state's folk singer Narendra Singh Negi for being honored with the prestigious Sangeet Natak Akademi Award at the national level. He said that the honor given to Narendra Singh Negi in the field of traditional folk songs is also the honor of the state.

=== Awaaz Ratna Award ===
On the occasion of Hindi Diwas (15 September 2021), the folk singer of Uttarakhand, Narendra Singh Negi has been honored with the Awaaz Ratna Award 2021.

== List of albums ==
Album	Release date	Ref
Nidekhi Paeli Kabhi	2025	
Hey Ramiye	2024	
Twi Chhayi	2023	
Kya Ji Bolun	2022	
Uttarakhand Devabhumi	2023	
Kab Aili	2022	
Syali Ramdei	2022	
Band Bijora	2022	
Hori Ka Khilari	2022	
Kamera Mwara	2022	
Yakhi Basa Rai Jaula	2021	
Kui Ta Baat Holi	2020	
Chali Bhai Motor Chali	2005	
Ghasyari	2002	
Haldi Hath	1995	
Hosiya Umar	2002	
Jai Dhari Devi	1996	
Kai The Khojyani Holi	2006	
Maya Ko Mundaro	2009	
Nauchammi Narena	2006	
Nayu Nayu Byo Chha	2003	
Rumuk	2005	
Salanya Syali	2009	
Samdola Ka Dwi Din	2000	
Syani	2002	
Thando Re Thando	2004	
Tu Holi Bira	2007	
Tumari Maya Ma	2001	
Utha Jaga Uttarakhand	2017	
Khud	1995	
Ab Kathga Khailo	2012	
Wa Junyali Rat Aige Phir Yad	2006	
Tapkara	1999	
Barkha	1992	
Basant Aige	2010	
Taka Chhan Ta Taktaka	2007	
Kargile Laraima	1999	
Chhibrat	1993	
Geet Ganga	2002	
Surma Sarela	2007	
Chhuyal	2006	
Jai Bhole Bhandari	2017	

== List of movies ==
Movie	Release date
Chakrachal	1996
Gharjawain	1986
Meri Ganga Holi Ta Maima Aali	2004
Kauthig	1987
Batwaru	2003
Chham Ghunguru	2005
Jai Dhari Devi	2006
Suberau Gham	2014

== See also ==
- Meena Rana
- Pritam Bhartwan
