= Dhol Sagar =

Ancient Indian treatise on the art of playing the dhol and damau

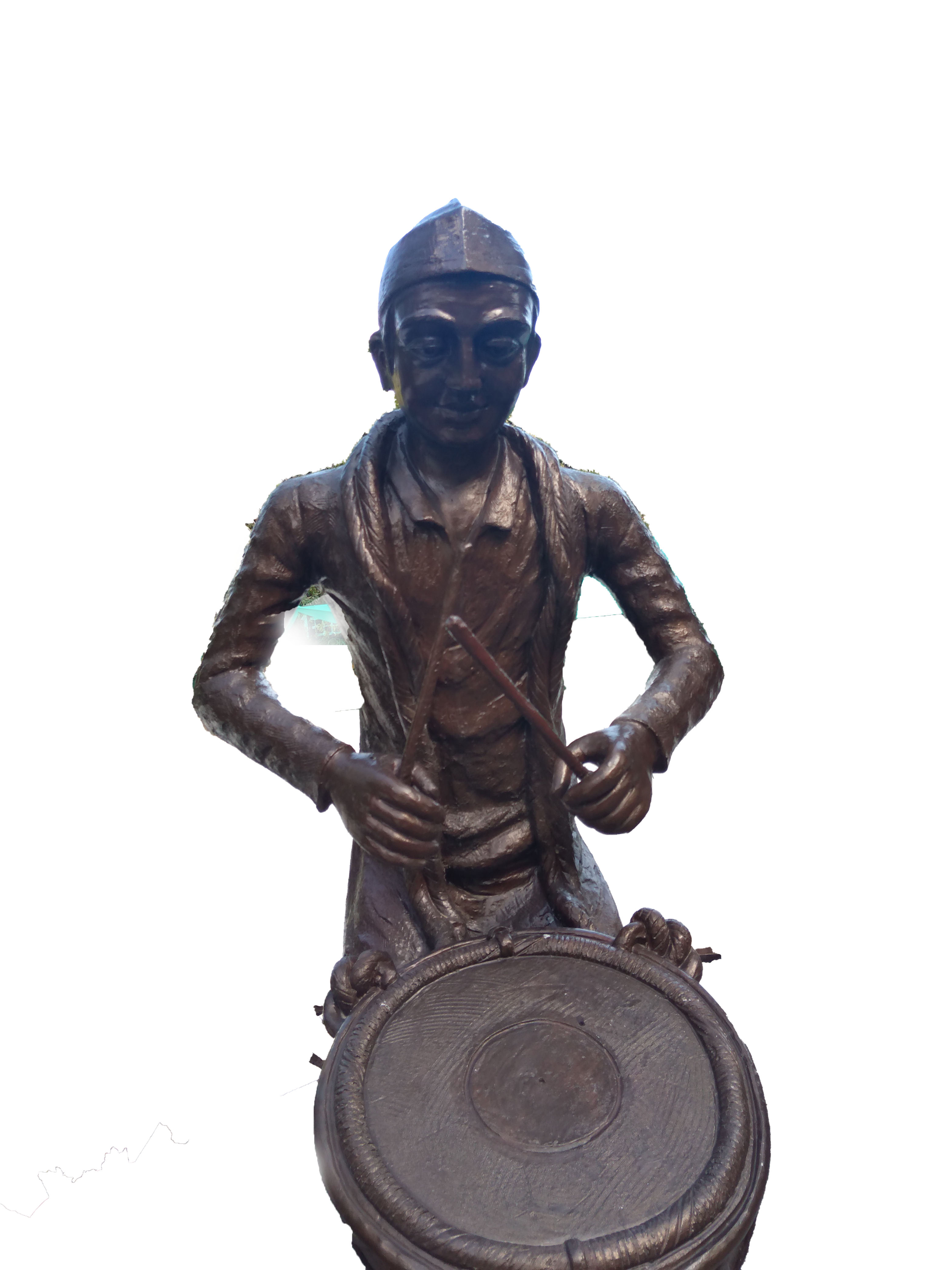
A figurine of a dholi.

Dhol Sagar (Garhwali; literally "ocean of drumming") is an ancient Indian treatise on the art of playing the dhol damau, the folk instruments of the Garhwal region of Uttarakhand. It does not exist in a complete printed form, as it was transmitted orally (through percussive verses and vocable syllables) or empirically within the traditional drumming families. It is believed to have mythical origins and its existence has only been confirmed by local scholars and practitioners.

The treatise contains shlokas in Sanskrit or Garhwali, and specific rhythm patterns for occasions like christening, wedding ceremonies, religious festivals, shamanic rituals, ritual dramas like Pandav Lila, death rites etc. The players of Dhol Sagar traditionally belonged to particular musical caste groups such as auji, bajgi, das or dholi. Either due to urban migration among the youth in the drumming families, the growing popularity of brass bands and DJs in villages, or the drummers' desire to disassociate themselves from a practice that was historically tied to their specific "low-caste", the unwritten ancient knowledge of Dhol Sagar faces the threat of being lost. Many traditional drummers have either given up the practice or have been driven out of work.

== Bibliography ==
- Alter, Andrew (2014). Mountainous Sound Spaces: Listening to History and Music in the Uttarakhand Himalayas. Cambridge University Press. ISBN 9789384463069.
