= Mangal =

Mangal (or Manghal, Mangla) is a given name and a surname. Notable people with the name include:

== People with the given name ==
- Mangal (singer), Afghan singer
- Mangal Bagh (born 1973), Pakistani militant leader
- Mangal Dhillon, Indian actor and film producer
- Mangal Hussain, Afghan politician and military leader
- Mangal Kalindi, Indian politician
- Mangal Pandey (1827–1857), Indian soldier
- Mangal Prasad Tharu, Nepalese politician
- Mangal Raj Joshi (1920–2005), Nepali astrologer
- Mangal Singh Champia (born 1983), Indian archer
- Mangal Singh Prabhakar (born 1859), Maharaja of Alwar
- Mangal Singh Ramgarhia (1800–1879), Indian Sikh leader

== People with the surname ==
- Habib Mangal (born 1946), Afghan politician
- Mohammad Gulab Mangal (born 1958), Afghan politician
- Nawroz Mangal (born 1984), Afghan cricket player
- Ujjwal Mangal (born 2003), Indian
