= Madhuri Barthwal =

Indian folk singer

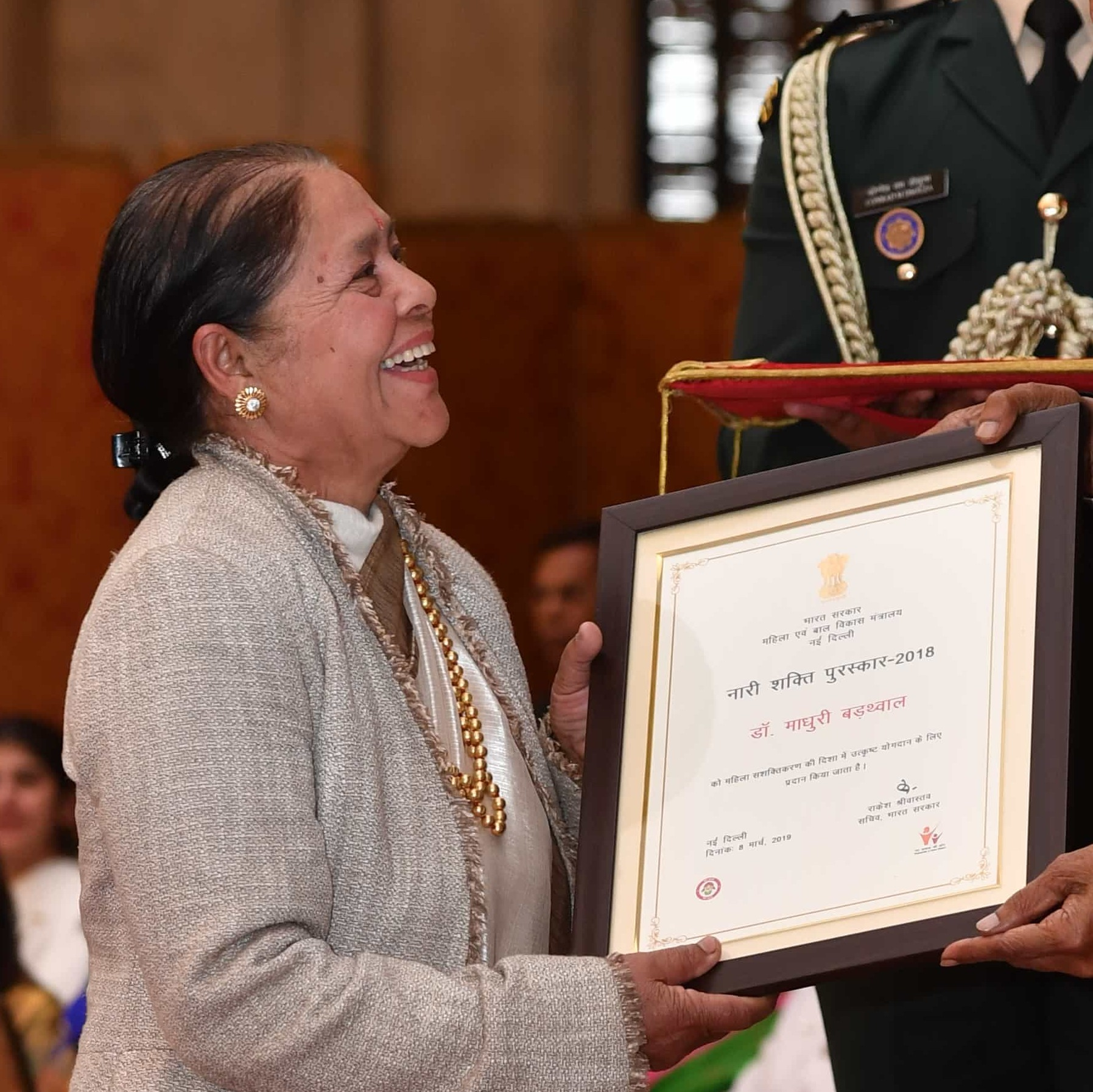
- Occupations: singer, teacher
- Employer: All India Radio
- Known for: folk preservation both Music and dance of Uttarakhand

Madhuri Barthwal née Uniyal is a folk singer of Uttarakhand, India. She is the first woman to be a music composer in All India Radio. She is said to be the first female musician from Uttarakhand to become a music teacher. On International Women's Day in 2019 she was awarded the Nari Shakti Puraskar by Ram Nath Kovind. She was awarded the Padma Shri India's fourth highest civilian award in 2022 by the Indian government in the field of art.

== Life ==
Barthwal's father was a singer and a sitarist. After she graduated she spent several years as a music teacher at a college. In her spare time she was composing for All India Radio in Nazibabad. She became an enthusiastic supporter of the Folk music of Uttarakhand and she created the radio programme "Dharohar" which was dedicated to the region's heritage and it's folk music. She is said to know every musical instrument that has been used in Uttarakhand. She has helped to record the music of other musicians.

As a teacher she has inspired several to become professional musicians amongst the many hundreds that she taught. She has sung with her fellow Garhwali singer Narendra Singh Negi.

Barthwal's work was recognised with the Nari Shakti Puraskar, which was presented by Ram Nath Kovind, the President of India in recognition of the sixty years she had dedicated to music, broadcasting and teaching. The citation noted that she had "devoted her life" to the preservation of music.

The award ceremony was held at the President's palace, Rashtrapati Bhavan, on International Women's Day in 2019 in New Delhi. About forty women received the award that day and three of the awards were given to groups. The Minister of Women and Child Development Maneka Gandhi was there and afterwards the awardees met the Prime Minister Narendra Modi.
