= B. M. Shah =

Brij Mohan Shah
- Born: 1933; Nainital, Uttarakhand
- Died: 5 June 1998 (aged 64–65); Lucknow, Uttar Pradesh
- Occupations: playwright, theatre director, teacher

Brij Mohan Shah (1933–1998), better known as B M Shah, was an Indian theatre director and playwright. Shah along with Mohan Upreti, are together credited for the revival of the theatre in the Uttarakhand. He was awarded the Sangeet Natak Akademi Award in 1979.

== Biography ==
Brij Mohan Shah was born in 1933 in Nainital, he joined National School of Drama (NSD), New Delhi in 1960, and trained under, Ebrahim Alkazi, and later graduated in 1962. He also remained a Director at the school (1982–84). He is remembered for his plays, Tughlaq, Ghasiram Kotwal, Hayavadana, Do Kishitiyon Ke Sawar, and his most noted play was a playwright was the satirical play, 'Trishanku' (1967).

He also directed play for the Bhartendu Natya Academy (BNA) Lucknow and Shri Ram Centre for Performing Arts Repertory Company

Shah was also a well regarded Sanskrit teacher at St. Columba's School, Delhi for several years, before he became Director, National School of Drama (New Delhi).

He also acted in two Hindi films, Yeh Woh Manzil To Nahin (1987) directed by Sudhir Mishra, followed by Dil Se.. (1998) by Mani Ratnam and a documentary film, The Post Master.

He died on 5 June 1998 in Lucknow.

== Legacy ==
When he was Director of Bhartendu Natya Academy (BNA). Upon his death, 'B. M. Shah Award' was constituted by Uttar Pradesh Sangeet Natak Akademi, given each year to for outstanding contribution to the field of theatre . And BNA give name of own auditorium B. M. Shah Auditorium in Gomti Nagar in Lucknow.

== See also ==
- Music of Uttarakhand
- Theatre in India
- Kumaoni people
