= Rajula and Malushahi =

Medieval folk tale

Rajula-Malushahi is an old medieval period love story and folklore of Uttarakhand. It describes love between Rajula, a young girl of Shauka family and Malushahi, a prince belonging to Katyuri dynasty of Kumaon.

== Story ==
Based on local folk tales, songs of Kumaon, King Dola Shah of Bairath (present day Chaukhutia). He did not have children. He was advised that if he worshiped Lord Shiva at Bagnath (present-day Bageshwar), he would get children. There, Dola Shah finds a childless couple, Sunapati Shauk-Ganguly. Both decide that if one has a boy and the other has a girl, then they will marry both. Later, a son was born to Shah and a daughter to Sunapati. Astrologers tell King Dola Shah to sum up the son's short death, and recommend him to marry a young girl. However, Dola Shah remembering the promise. goes to Sunapati and makes a symbolic marriage of Rajula-Malushahi. Meanwhile, the king dies. The courtiers curse Rajula for this. Rumors spread that if this girl child enters the state then it will be disastrous. On the other hand, Rajula grows up seeing the dream of Malushahi. Meanwhile, Vikhipal the king of Hun sends a marriage proposal to Sunapati after hearing about the beauty of Rajula and threatens her family to accept the proposal or else he will burn their home and imprison them. However, Rajula does not accept the proposal. as her family continuously forces her, She escapes at night taking the symbolic wedding ring, travelling through Munsiari and crossing the river, drain, mountain and reaches Bairath via Bageshwar. But Malushahi's mother remembers the court. She uses the sleeping herb and makes Malushahi unconscious. Malushahi does not wake up even after awakening Rajula's lacquer. Rajula gets back crying. Here the parents get Hun Raja married to her under pressure. On the other hand, Malushahi is free from the influence of the herb. He dreams of Rajula, who begs him to save her from the Vikhipal. Malushahi remembers childhood marriage. When he decides to go to Rajula, the mother protests. On this, Malushahi Renounce the kingdom and becomes a Sanyasi. he then continues his journey and Wandering from time to time he meets Baba gorakhnath. With his guidance, he reaches the kingdom of Hun. Rajula becomes very happy to see Malushahi, but the Vikhipal hearing the story of Malushahi, feeds him poisonous meal causing the death of Malushahi.

However, some cultures refer to a different ending suggesting that Malushahi did not die. In those cultures, it is believed that neither Rajula nor Malushahi dies. Rather, it is suggested that they both elope in the end.

== Legacy ==
it is considered one of the most popular folklore of Kumaon. it has been performed in Kumaon for about thousand years and passed down orally from generation to generation in family of traditional bards, Mohan Upreti brought the epic ballad on the regional and national theaters, in 1980 Sangeet Natak Akademi of India published book on the epic ballad of Rajula-Malushahi.

== See also ==
- The Immortal Love Folk Tale of Rajula and Malushahi.
