= Jagwal =

- Directed by: Parashar Gaur
- Production company: Anchalik Films
- Release date: 4 May 1983
- Country: India
- Language: Garhwali

Jagwal is a 1983 Garhwali family melodrama by Prashant Gaur. It was the first Garhwali language movie made. Jagwal which means 'the long wait' revolves around the life story of a young woman awaiting the release of her husband from prison.

Gaur first conceived the idea of making a Garhwali Film in 1975 but didn't actually start working on it till 1982. Gaur faced difficulties financing the film and was cheated by some producers who initially stepped up to produce the film. The first screening was at a non-commercial hall at the Malvankaran hall in Delhi.

== Plot ==
A cheerful young woman living in Pauri plans to visit a mela with her friends. On her way stumbles into Biru, a gente-natured 'pardesi', who grows interested in her and asks her for her name. Meanwhile Sheru, Biru's younger brother keeps delaying asking his family for permission to marry his girlfriend her telling her he will marry her tomorrow.

It is revealed that Biru was visiting Pauri to finalise his marriage to a woman who turned out to be indu. On the day of his wedding Biru's youngest brother, gets drunk, and gets into a quarrel with a priest who begins to beat him. Biru intervenes and accidentally ends up injuring the priest in an attempt to break up the fight.

On their nuptial night the police arrests Biru and inform Biru the priest died in hospital. Biru is tried for murder and is given 10 years of imprisonment. Biru advises Indu to marry his younger brother, Sheru, or to run away from home. However, she refuses to follow her husband's advise and decides to wait for him.

== See also ==
- Suberau Ghaam, 2014 Garhwali language film
- Pyre, a 2024 Hindi Language film set in Kumaon
