= Turri =

Turri is a surname. Notable people with the surname include:

- Juan Adolfo Turri (1950–2010), Argentinian athlete
- Donatella Turri (born 1945), Italian actress
- Mirko Turri (born 1981), Italian bobsledder
- Mosè Turri (1837–1903), Italian painter
- Pellegrino Turri (1765–1828), Italian inventor

== See also ==
- Torri
- Turri, Sardinia, Italy
- Turris (disambiguation)
