= Naima Khan Upreti =

Indian theatre actor (1938–2018)

- नईमा खान उप्रेती
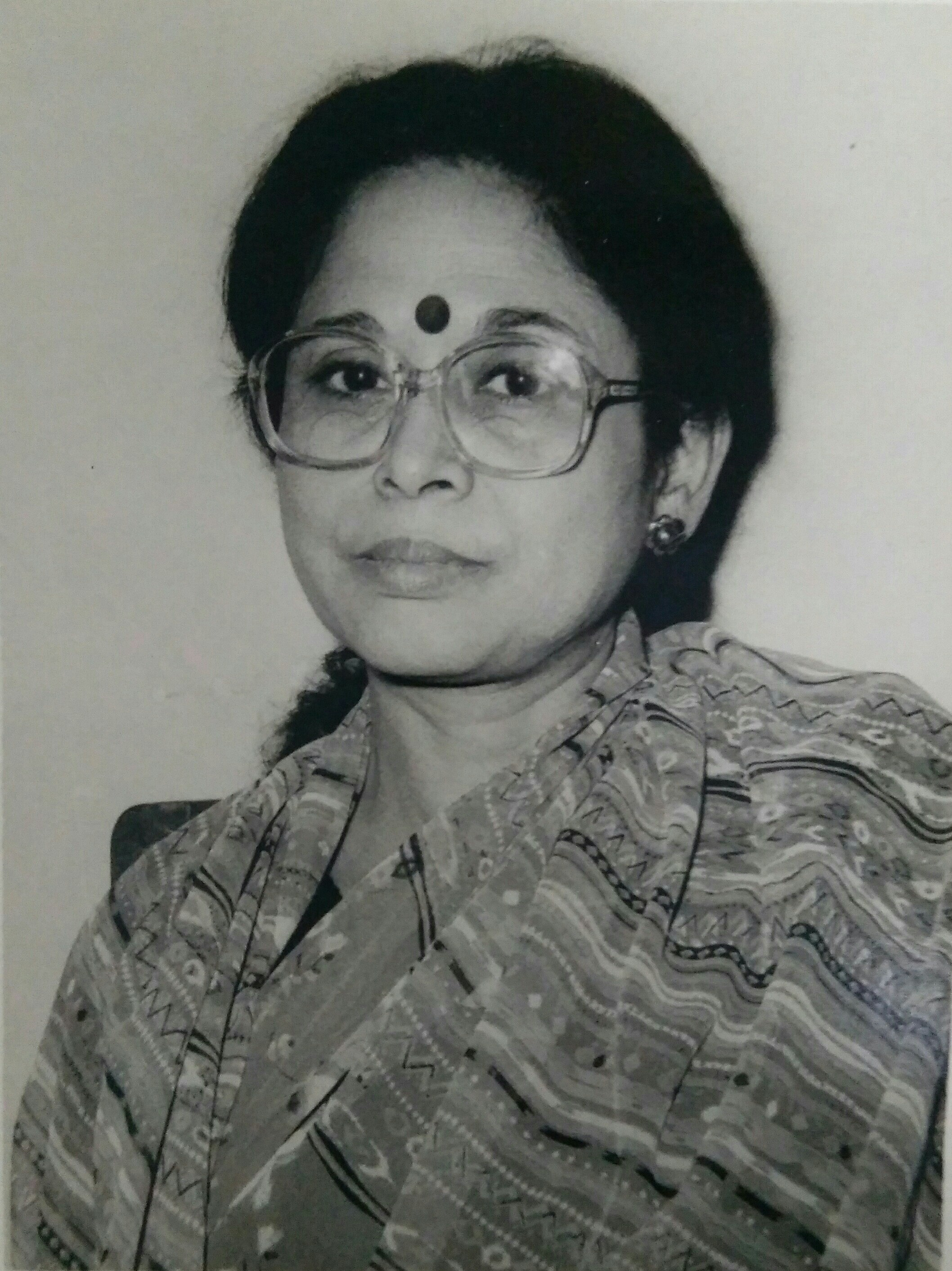
- Born: 25 May 1938; Almora
- Died: 15 June 2018 (aged 80); Delhi
- Education: Agra University; National School of Drama; Film and Television Institute of India
- Occupations: Singer, actor, producer
- Spouse: Mohan Upreti

Naima Khan Upreti (Hindi: नईमा खान उप्रेती; 25 May 1938 – 15 June 2018) was an Indian theatre actor, singer and a producer at Doordarshan. She was also the wife of Mohan Upreti, considered to be one of the pioneers in Indian theatre music.

Naima Khan Upreti is a popular figure in Kumaon and she is remembered for her contribution towards the preservation and revitalisation of Uttarakhand's folk music along with her husband Mohan Upreti. She is famous for singing the popular Kumaoni-language song "Bedu Pako Baro Masa" along with her husband. She is also known for her efforts towards preserving old Kumaoni ballads, songs and folk traditions as a member and later the President of Parvatiya Kala Kendra, Delhi. During her time in Doordarshan, she was involved in the production of Doordarshan's first colour television program along with Sharad Dutt.

== Biography ==
=== Early life and education ===
Naima Khan Upreti was born on 25 May 1938 in Almora, Uttarakhand to a Muslim father and a Christian mother. She received her schooling from Adam's Girls School followed by Ramsay Inter College school in Almora. In 1958 she received a Bachelor of Arts in English Literature, Political Science and Economics from Agra University. Later, she graduated from the National School of Drama in 1969 with a three-year diploma in acting and also worked with the NSD Repertory Company for some time. She also received a diploma from the Film and Television Institute of India, Pune.

=== Career ===
As a member of the NSD Repertory Company, Naima Khan Upreti participated in a number of theatre productions and worked along with many personalities of theatre such as Ebrahim Alkazi, Surekha Sikri, Uttara Baokar, M. K. Raina and others. She worked in many theatre productions of that time such as Othello, The Caucasian Chalk Circle, Natak Polampur Ka, Skandagupta etc. She has been associated with Parvatiya Kala Kendra since its inception in 1968 and has participated in many of their productions such as Rajula Malushahi, Ajuwa Baphaul, Rami, Ramlila, Indra Sabha, etc. After Mohan Upreti's death in 1997, Naima Khan Upreti took charge of Parvatiya Kala Kendra as it is president. She carried forward Mohan Upreti's work and organised many theatre productions such as Meghdutam, Rami, Goridhana, Amir Khusrau, Algoza etc.

She lent her voice to many folk songs, theatre productions and radio programs of All India Radio.

Until her retirement, she worked in Doordarshan and was a producer of a number of their television productions such as Krishi Darshan, coverage of Khajuraho Dance Festival etc. She also won a number of accolades such as a Lifetime Achievement Award from Natsamrat theatre group in 2010.

She died on 15 June 2018 in Delhi, aged 80.

=== Family ===
Naima Khan Upreti was married to Mohan Upreti.

== Legacy ==
Naima Khan Upreti and Mohan Upreti together sang many folk songs from Uttarakhand. The songs "Bedu Pako Baro Masa" and "O Lali Hausiya" were also recorded by His Master's Voice.

Naima Khan Upreti also published a compilation of Muslim wedding songs in the book - Nagmati Rasm.

She also contributed to the archives of Natarang Pratishthan.
