= Mahadevshastri Joshi =

Indian writer (1906–1992)

Mahadevshastri Joshi (January 12, 1906 - December 12, 1992) was an Indian Marathi writer.

== Early life ==
Joshi was born on January 12, 1906, in the town of Ambede in Goa. He received the epithets shastri and pandit following his education in a Sanskrit pathshala in Sangli.

In his student days, Joshi also frequented the public library in Sangli and widely read the works of modern Marathi writers of his time like Narayan Sitaram Phadke and Vishnu Sakharam Khandekar. Especially, Khandekar's short stories and novels highly influenced him to want to be a writer like Khandekar.

== Literary works ==
=== Encyclopedia ===
- Bharatiya Sanskruti Kosh (भारतीय संस्कृतिकोश) (10 volumes). These ten volumes contain information on Indian history, geography, various ethnic and lingual groups, festivals of these groups, and other cultural aspects of their life.

=== Cultural informative works ===
- Marathi Saraswat (मराठी सारस्वत) (2 volumes) (Co-authored with अनंत जोशी)
- Purush Suktam (पुरूषसूक्तम्) (Co-authored with श्री. शि. धायगुडे)
- Teerthaswarup Maharashtra (तीर्थस्वरूप महाराष्ट्र ) (2 volumes)
- Maharashtrache Kanthamani (महाराष्ट्राचे कंठमणी) (2 volumes)
- Marathi Lekhak (मराठी लेखक) (Co-authored with अनंत जोशी)
- Mulyawan Goshti (मूल्यवान गोष्टी) (Health and Diet)
- Maharashtrachi Dharatirthe (महाराष्ट्राची धारातीर्थे)
- Sanskrutichya Pranganat (संस्कृतीच्या प्रांगणात)
- Tirtha Kshetranchya Goshti (तीर्थक्षेत्रांच्या गोष्टी)
- Dnyaneshwari Praweshika (ज्ञानेश्वरी प्रवेशिका)
- Shri Nawanath Kathasar (श्रीनवनाथ कथासार)
- Kanasat Pikali Motye (कणसांत पिकली मोत्ये)
- Bhimachi Madhukari (भिमाची माधुकरी)
- Bharatiya Murtikala (भारतीय मूर्तीकला)
- Sanskrutichi Pratike (संस्कृतीची प्रतीके)
- Minakshi Kanya (मीनाक्षी कन्या)
- Navanit Bharat (नवनीत भारत)
- Gajati Daiwate ( गाजती दैवते)
- Daso Digambar (दासो दिगंबर)
- Kala Bhandari (काला भंडारी)
- Mani Mekhala (मणिमेखला)
- Ugra Pandya (उग्र पांड्य)
- Nakshatralok (नक्षत्रलोक)
- Satya Dharma (सत्यधर्म)
- Nilamadhav (नीलमाधव)
- Pushpadanta (पुष्पदंत)
- Dindir Wan (दिंडीरवन)
- Satwadhir (सत्वधीर)
- Tyagaraj (त्यागराज)
- Bahubali (बाहुबली)

=== Autobiography ===
- Aamacha Wanaprastha (आमचा वानप्रस्थ) (1983)
- AtmapuraaN (आत्मपुराण) (1985)

=== Collections of short stories ===
- Dushyant Shakuntala (दुष्यंत शकुंतला)
- Khadakatale Pajhar (खडकांतले पाझर)
- Kalpit Ani Satya (कल्पित आणि सत्य)
- Katha Sugandha (कथा सुगंध)
- Pangala Arun (पांगळा अरुण)
- Sati Sukanya (सती सुकन्या)
- Manju Mangal (मंजु मंगल)
- Kalpa Wruksha (कल्पवृक्ष)
- Kiriti Arjun (किरिटी अर्जुन)
- Babhruwahan (बभ्रुवाहन)
- Dhumdhumar (धुंधुमार)
- Kanyadan (कन्यादान)
- Mohanwel (मोहनवेल)
- Niladhwaj (नीलध्वज)
- Gunakeshi (गुणकेशी)
- Ghararighi (घररिघी)
- Bhawabal (भावबळ)
- Putrawati (पुत्रवती)
- Pratima (प्रतिमा)
- Wirani (विराणी)
- Lage Bandhe

=== Children's literature (बालवाङ्मय) ===
- १०० गोष्टी आख्यायिका
- प्राचीन सुरस माला
- जनपदकथामाला
- रक्मानंद मोहिनी
- कथाकल्पकता
- प्रलय घंघाळ
- वत्सलाहरण
- कुंडलाहरण
- गुरूदक्षिणा
- चंद्रवदना

=== Travelogues ===
- Priya Bharat (प्रिय भारत)
- Jammu - Kashmir (जम्मू-काश्मीर)
- Punjab - Haryana (पंजाब-हरियाणा)
- Uttar Pradesh - Bharat Darshan (उत्तर प्रदेश)
- Bihar (बिहार)
- Madhya Pradesh (मध्यप्रदेश )
- Rajasthan (राजस्थान)
- Gujarat (गुजरात)
- Maharashtra (महाराष्ट्)
- Karnataka (कर्नाटक)
- Kerala (केरळ)
- Tamil Nadu(तामिळनाडू)
- Andhra (आंध्र)
- Odisha (ओडिसा)
- Bengal (बंगाल)
- Assam - Manipur (आसाम मणिपूर)

== Awards ==
Pune University awarded an honorary D. Lit. degree to Joshi for his Bharatiya Sanskruti Kosh (भारतीय संस्कृतिकोश), which comprised 10 volumes of 800 pages each.

== Legacy ==
Thirteen Marathi movies, including "कन्यादान”, "धर्मकन्या”, "वैशाख वणवा”, "मानिनी”, and जिव्हाळा were based on Joshi's short stories.
