= Santosh Joshi =

Santosh Joshi संतोष जोशी
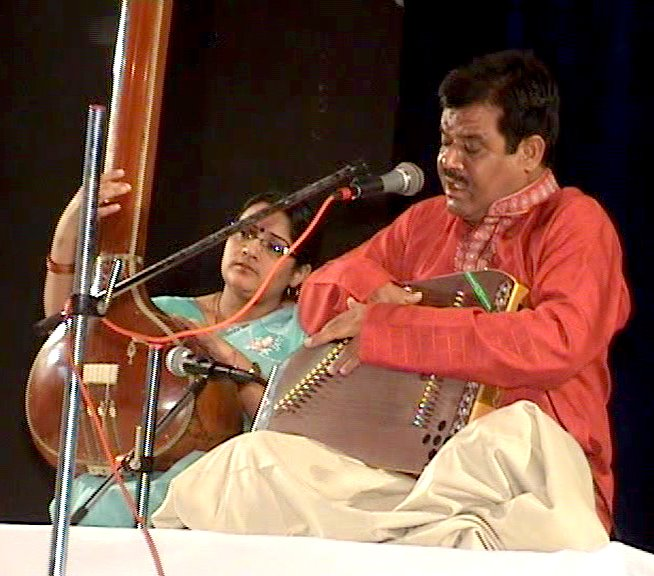
- Pt.Santosh Joshi singing raga kirwani in a concert at Town hall

Background information
- Born: 2 July 1960 (age 65); Bikaner
- Genres: Hindustani classical music
- Occupations: Classical vocalist and instrumentalist
- Instruments: tabla, guitar

Pandit Santosh Joshi (born 2 July 1960) is an Indian vocalist in the Hindustani classical tradition. He is a member of the Joshi Gharana, a branch of the Lucknow tabla gharana. He is known for the khayal form of singing, as well as for his popular renditions of devotional bhajans and Hori. He is the most recent recipient of the Rajiv Ratna Award of Bikaner.

== Early life ==
Santosh Joshi was born into a Pushtikar Brahmin family in Bikaner. His father, Shiv Narayan Joshi, was a tabla player of Abid Hussain's Poorab Lucknow Gharana and a student of Suraj Karan Ranga and Pt. Hirendra ganguly (popularly known as Hiru babu Ganguly).

== Musical training and career ==
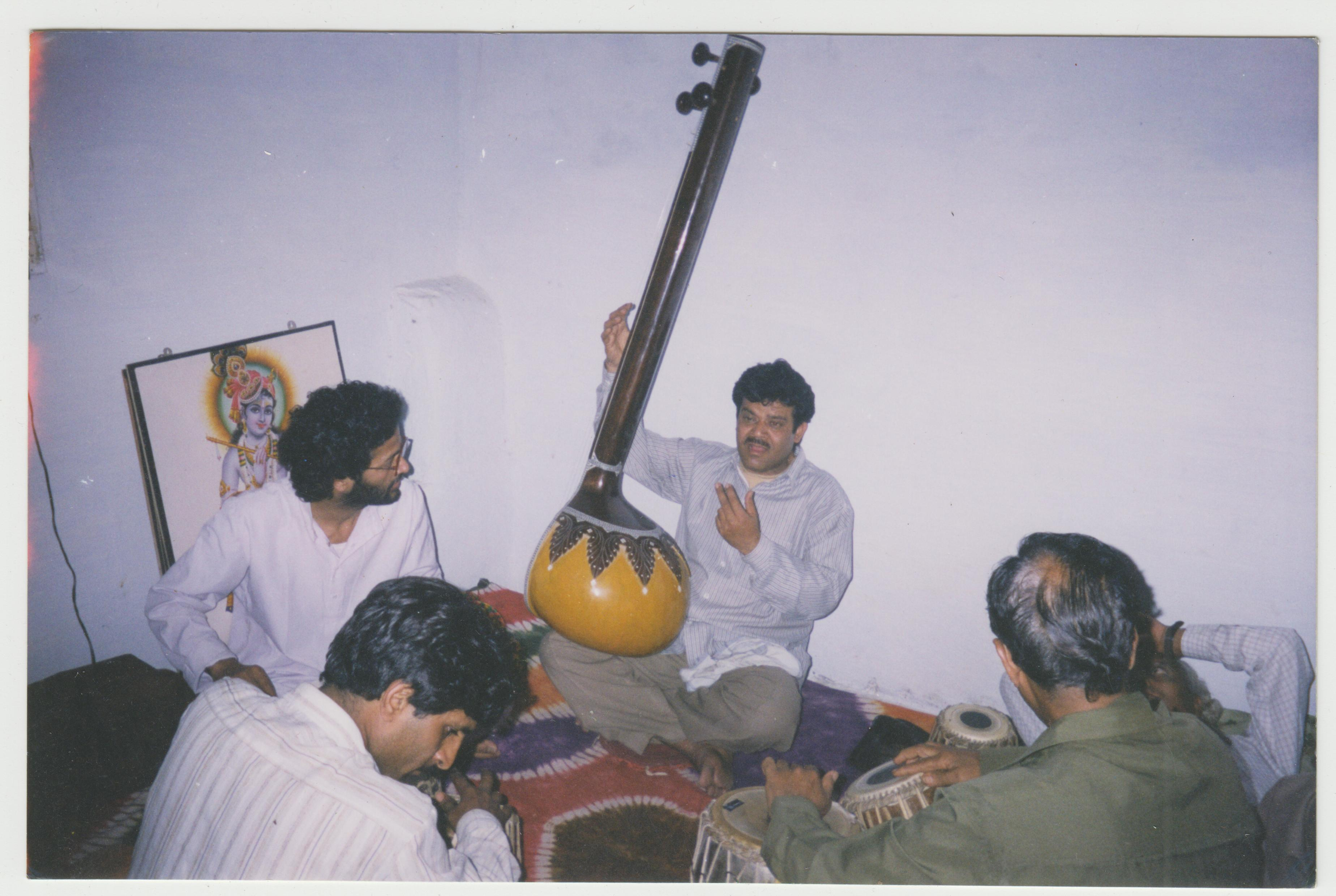
During riyaz with Elder brother Pt.Parmanand Joshi on Tabla

Joshi received his tabla training from his elder brother Paramanand Joshi and also started lap (Hawaiian) guitar playing under the guidance of G.D. Jhanwar. He received a degree in vocal music from the Bhatkhande School of Music in Lucknow and from the Indira Kala Sangeet Vishwavidyalaya (I.K.S. University) in Khairagarh. He is also a B-high grade artist of All India Radio. He is especially known for his taans which are produced more intuitively than through deliberation, and for surprising and sudden turns of phrase, for example through the unexpected use of bol taans. Over the years, his repertoire has tended to favor a relatively small number of complex and serious ragas. Joshi is currently retired from Government M.S. College in Bikaner.

He is now a member of West zone culture centre of Government of India which is situated in Udaipur .
