= Khadg Singh Valdiya =

Indian geologist and academic (1937–2020)

Khadg Singh (KS) Valdiya
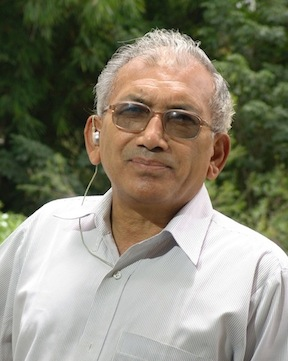
- Born: 20 March 1937; Kalaw, Burma
- Died: 29 September 2020 (aged 83)
- Occupation: Geologist
- Known for: Tectonics, Environmental Geology
- Parent(s): Dev Singh Valdiya; Nanda Valdiya
- Awards: Padma Bhushan 2015; The G.M Modi Award for Science and Environment 2012; L.N. Kailasam Gold Medal 2009; Padma Shri 2007; Hindi Sevi Samman (Atmaram Award) 2007; Prince Mukarram Gold Medal 2000; National Mineral Award of Excellence 1997; D.N. Wadia Medal 1995; National Mineral Award 1993; S.K. Mitra Award 1991; P. Pant National Environment Fellow 1982–84; National Lecturer 1977–78; L. Rama Rao Gold Medal 1977; Shanti Swarup Bhatnagar Prize 1976; Chancellor’s Medal at Lucknow University 1954
- Website: http://www.ksvaldiya.info/

Khadg Singh Valdiya (20 March 1937 – 29 September 2020) was an Indian geologist and a former vice chancellor of Kumaon University. A 2007 recipient of Padma Shri, he was honoured again by the Government of India in 2015 with Padma Bhushan, the third highest Indian civilian award.

== Biography ==
Valdiya was born to Dev Singh Valdiya and Nanda Valdiya on 20 March 1937 in Myanmar. In 1947 his family returned to their hometown in Pithoragarh in the Indian state of Uttarakhand. After schooling in Pithoragarh, he did his bachelor (BSc), masters (MSc) and doctoral (PhD) studies at Lucknow University and joined the university as a member of faculty in 1957. A 1965–66 Fulbright scholar at Johns Hopkins University, he had also taught at Rajasthan University, Wadia Institute of Himalayan Geology, Jawaharlal Nehru Centre for Advanced Scientific Research (JNCASR) and Kumaon University. He was the vice chancellor of Kumaon University in 1981.

Valdiya was involved with the establishment of the Wadia Institute of Himalayan Geology, Central Himalayan Environmental Association, Nainital, G. B. Pant Institute of Himalayan Environment and Development, Almora, and the Geology Department of the Kumaon University. He was an elected fellow of Indian National Science Academy, National Academy of Sciences, India (FNASc), Indian Academy of Sciences (FASc), and the Third World Academy of Sciences (FTWAS) and was a fellow of Geological Society of India, Geological Society of America and Geological Society of Nepal. He had served as a member of the Scientific Advisory Council to the Prime Minister of India. In 2016 and 2019, Valdiya became a laureate of the Asian Scientist 100 by the Asian Scientist.

Valdiya wrote over 110 research papers, authored 22 books, edited 9 books and penned 40 articles in Hindi towards popularization of science.

Valdiya died on 29 September 2020, at the age of 83.

== Books ==
Valdiya wrote over 120 research papers, authored 21 books, edited 9 books and penned 40 articles in Hindi towards popularization of science.

These include Geology of Kumaon Lesser Himalaya (1980), Aspects of Tectonics: Focus on South-central Asia (1984), Environmental Geology: Indian Context (1987), Dynamic Himalaya (1998), Himalaya: Emergence and Evolution (2001),Kumaun Land and People (2001),Saraswati, the River That Disappeared (2002), The Making of India: Geodynamic Evolution (2010), and Ek Thi Nadi Saraswati (2010, in Hindi)., Geography, Peoples and Geodynamics of India in Puranas and Epics: A Geologist's Interpretations (2012), Prehistoric River Saraswati, Western India: Geological Appraisal and Social Aspects (2018), Neotectonism in the Indian Subcontinent: Landscape Evolution (2017)(Co-authored with Jaishri Sanwal)

His autobiography "पथरीली पगडंडियों पर" was published by PAHAR in 2015.

In 2017, he wrote a biography of famous environmentalist and Chipko leader Padma Vibhushan Sunderlal Bahuguna named ‘हिमालय में महात्मा गांधी के सिपाही सुंदरलाल बहुगुणा’ published by Sasta Sahitya Mandal.

== See also ==
- Geodynamics
- Neotectonics
- Sedimentology
