= Pandav Lila =

Hindu tradition

Pandav Lila or Pandav Nritya (Sanskrit; literally "play of the Pandavas" and "dance of the Pandavas" respectively) is a ritual re-enactment of stories from the Hindu epic Mahabharata, through singing, dancing and recitation, that is practised in the Garhwal region of Uttarakhand, India. Pandavas are the five protagonists in the epic and the village amateurs take on their roles and perform the lila outdoors, accompanied by the folk instruments dhol, damau and two long trumpets called bhankore. The performances, which can last anywhere from three days to a month in different villages, draw large crowds and are an important cultural highlight of the year. The ritualistic drama features actors who often spontaneously become "possessed" by the spirits of their characters and begin to dance.

== History and format ==
The origins of the Pandav Lila are intermingled with Hindu mythology . It has always been performed by village amateurs, and not professionals, and is usually sponsored by the Janman's (Kshatriya) Every village can have its own variation, and some may place a greater emphasis on singing or drama. The performances begin at night and last till early mornings. The episodes from the epic are not necessarily performed in a linear order, as the intention is not to convey the epic's story but dance out or enact specific scenes that the artists or villagers are familiar with. As the story progresses and the action intensifies, they begin to start earlier in the day and continue till morning next day. The most-awaited episode is often a battle between a father and a son, Arjuna and Nagarjuna, which is known by the name gainda (Hindi for rhinoceros), as it involves Arjuna killing the rhinoceros that belongs to his son. The weapons used in the drama are worshipped and are never allowed to touch the ground, so they can retain their power, and are taken care of till the next lila. As it is practically impossible to enact the whole of Mahabharata, the longest epic poem in existence, the performers can choose their own episodes for enactment.

== Bibliography ==
- Sax, William Sturman (2002). Dancing the Self: Personhood and Performance in the Pāṇḍava Līlā of Garhwal. Oxford University Press. ISBN 9780195139150.
