= Prem Lal Joshi =

Indian educationalist

- Born: 4 February 1952 (age 74); Garhwal, Uttarakhand, India
- Occupations: Professor, Author
- Children: 3

Academic background
- Education: University of Delhi; Garhwal University

Academic work
- Main interests: International Accounting, Budgeting and Management Accounting
- Website: www.acadjoshi.com

Prem Lal Joshi (born 1952) is an Indian educationalist, scholar, author and writer for over four decades and has worked in several countries. He has worked as a Professor of Accounting (2013–19) at the Multimedia University, Cyberjaya, Malaysia. He has also been chairman of the Center for Excellence in Business Performance (CEBP) for three years. He was a Professor of Accounting at the University of Bahrain (1993-2012), Kingdom of Bahrain. Prior to that, he worked as an Associate and Assistant Professor at National Institute of Industrial Engineering (NITIE), Mumbai (1984-1993), Visiting Associate Professor at Bilkent University (1989–90). He was a Senior Fellow of the Indian Council of Social Science Research (ICSSR), New Delhi (2019-2021) to conduct research in the Internal auditing area.

He is the founding and honorary editor of the International Journal of Accounting Auditing and Performance Evaluation, the founding honorary editor of Afro Asian Journal of Finance and Accounting, the founding and Editor-in-Chief of the International Journal of Auditing and Accounting Studies, and the Editor-in-Chief of the Global Journal of Accounting and Economy Research. In addition to his nine books, he has published more than 130 research papers in accredited international journals in Accounting and Interdisciplinarity areas all over the world.

== Early life and education ==
Joshi earned his Ph.D. in commerce (finance and accounting) from Hemwati Nandan Bahuguna Garhwal University, India, in 1981 and master's degree in commerce from South Delhi Campus, University of Delhi, in 1975. He was awarded a Teacher Fellowship by Indian Council of Social Science Research, New Delhi in 1979.

== Academic career ==
During the 1980s, he worked at Garhwal University, and played a key role in establishing its Faculty of Commerce.

He is the founding and honorary editor of the International Journal of Accounting Auditing and Performance Evaluation, the founding honorary editor of Afro Asian Journal of Finance and Accounting, the founding and Editor-in-Chief of the International Journal of Auditing and Accounting Studies and the Editor-in-Chief of the Global Journal of Accounting and Economy Research. He has published over 130 research papers in accounting and interdisciplinary areas in refereed accredited international journals. One of his papers on management accounting has been cited by international scholars for more than 449 times. Two of his books in accounting, written in consultation with Ministry of Education, Bahrain, are text books in Government Schools in Bahrain.

He was a member of AAA's IT Committee for 2005–06 and a VP of Indian audit asso. during 1991–92. He was also a member of European Accounting Association from 1995 to 2012. In 2007, he was admitted as an Academic Fellow by Association of International Accountants, United Kingdom.

He has also written more than 90 general articles which address contemporary issues related to society, the economy, and professionals. He also writes columns for a few online magazines and newspapers.

== Achievements and awards ==
He has received the Sardar Patel International Award, Hind Rattan Award, Rajiv Gandhi Excellence in Education award, Bharat Garav award, Bharat Nirman Award, NRI Institute award for Excellence. He was awarded the Distinguished Teacher at MTC Global Award For Excellence in 2015. In 2020, he was given SAS Life Time Achievement Award from Scholars Academic and Scientific Society (SAS Society).

In 2006, Joshi was included in the International Biographical Centre’s list of 2000 Outstanding Intellectuals of the 21st Century.

== Publications ==
=== Books ===
1. Financial Accounting I & II (co-authors: Latifa and others), published by Ministry of Education, Kingdom of Bahrain, 2003 (the book was written in consultation with UNESCO team).
2. Techniques of Zero Based Budgeting: Text and Cases, Himalaya Publishing, 1988, Mumbai, India.
3. Zero Based Budgeting Technology in Government, Deep and Dhurv Publishers, 1986, New Delhi, India.
4. Leasing Comes of Age: Indian Scene, Amrita Publication, 1985, Mumbai, India.
5. Institutional Financing in India, Deep & Deep Publications, 1984, New Delhi, India.
6. Introduction to Zero Based Budgeting, Deep & Deep Publishing, 1984, New Delhi, India.
7. Selected Readings in Big Data Analytics and Auditing, ISBN 9788172113919, 2021 (edited), Northern Book Centre, New Delhi, India
8. The Changing Role of Internal Audit Function in Organisations, 2022 (edited), ISBN 978-81-7211-397-1, Sultan Chand & Sons, New Delhi, India.
9. 21st Century Strategic Management Accounting and Performance Measurement Systems, 2022 (edited), ISBN 9789390620005, I.K. International Pvt. Ltd., New Delhi, India

== See also ==
- List of people from Uttarakhand
- List of Indian writers
