= Pichhaura =

Coordinates: 26°20′N 79°19′E

Pichhaura is a village in Martinganj block, Azamgarh district, Uttar Pradesh, India.
