= Mangal Raj Joshi =

Nepalese astrologer

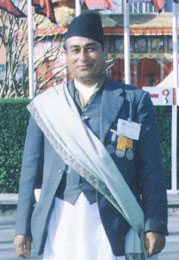
Prof. Mangal Raj Joshi at the Royal Palace in Nepal

Mangal Raj Joshi (1920–2005) was the Royal Astrologer of Nepal, whose family worked for more than 20 generations for the Nepalese kings. Dr. Joshi holds a Ph.D. in Urban Study and Planning, and was a professor at Patan College. Joshi was also the chairman of the Nepal Panchang Nirnayak Samiti and vice chairman of the Asian Panchang Samiti. Joshi failed to predict the Nepalese royal massacre, a point used by some against the effectiveness of astrology. Since he died, Nepal has been without a Royal Astrologer.

== General ==
At the age of 11, Joshi followed his father, Daibagya Krishna Raj Joshi's footsteps into astrology. The elder Joshi had edited and published Mangal Ephemeris for 77 yrs. Dr. Joshi also lent his presence to the education as a teacher at many colleges. His career began as a teacher at the Tri Chandra College in 1967. He was instrumental in the establishment of Patan Multiple College (PMC) in 1950 both as a teacher and programme in - charge. Later, he served as Principal of PMC in 1968. Besides his role as a scholar of geography and astrology, he had a diploma in Modernization in Education from Houston University, Texas, US. He also had a Ph.D. degree in Urban Study and Planning of Kathmandu Valley from Patna University, India.

Dr. Joshi died in Kathmandu on 2 March 2005 from a combination of kidney problems and a heart attack, according to his son, Dr. Badri Raj Joshi, B.A., M.S.C. (Predictive Astrology), Ph.D., PGA. Since then, Prof. Krishna prasad Adhikari has held the office of President of the Nepal Panchanga Nirnayak Samiti.

== Contributions ==
His contributions ranged from an Acharya of Astrology to Professor of Geography, Nepali and Nepal Bhasa at the master's level in PMC. Apart from this, he was graced with a golden crown as Royal Astrologer as well as recognition of his service to astrology at the International Astrologers Conference of 1988 in India.
