= Meena Rana =

Indian Uttarakhandi singer

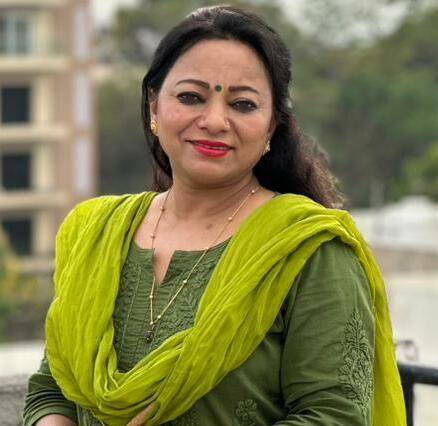

Background information
- Born: Delhi
- Genres: Folk, Uttarakhandi
- Occupations: Singer,Folk Singer
- Instrument: Vocals
- Years active: 1996–present
- Labels: T-Series; Himalayan Films
- Spouse: Sanjay Kumola (m. 2001)

Meena Rana is an Indian Uttarakhandi singer. She has released many Garhwali and Kumaoni music albums.

== Albums ==
Utarakhandi albums

- Chand taro maa
- Meri Khati Mitthi
- Darbar Nirala Sai ka

Utarakhandi Garhwali albums

- Teri meri Maya
- Meru Utarakhand
- Chilbilat
- Mohana
- Chandra
- Lalita Chi Hum

Utarakhandi Garhwali songs

- Sushma With Gajender Rana
- Bhalu Lagdu Bhanuli with Narender singh Negi
- Harya Bharya boun with Pritam Bhartwan
- Kai Gaon ki holi with Manglesh Dangwal
- Hoor Ki Pari With Anil Raturi
- Madhuli with Chanderveer Aarya

== Awards ==
Young Uttarakhand Cine Award

Year	Category	Song-Album	Won/Nominated
2010	Best Singer Female	Palya Gaun Ka Mohana (Mohana)	Won
2011	Best Singer Female	Hit O Bhina (Tu Meri Nasib)	Nominated
2011	Best Singer Female	Au Bulanu Yo Pahara (Din Jawani Char)	Won
2012	Best Lyrist	Ham Uttarakhandi Chha (Chandra)	Nominated
2012	Best Singer Female	Ham Uttarakhandi Chha (Chandra)	Won
2013	Best Singer Female	Ai Ja Re Dagadya (Negi Ki Cheli)	Nominated*
