= Damau =

Type of Indian folk drum

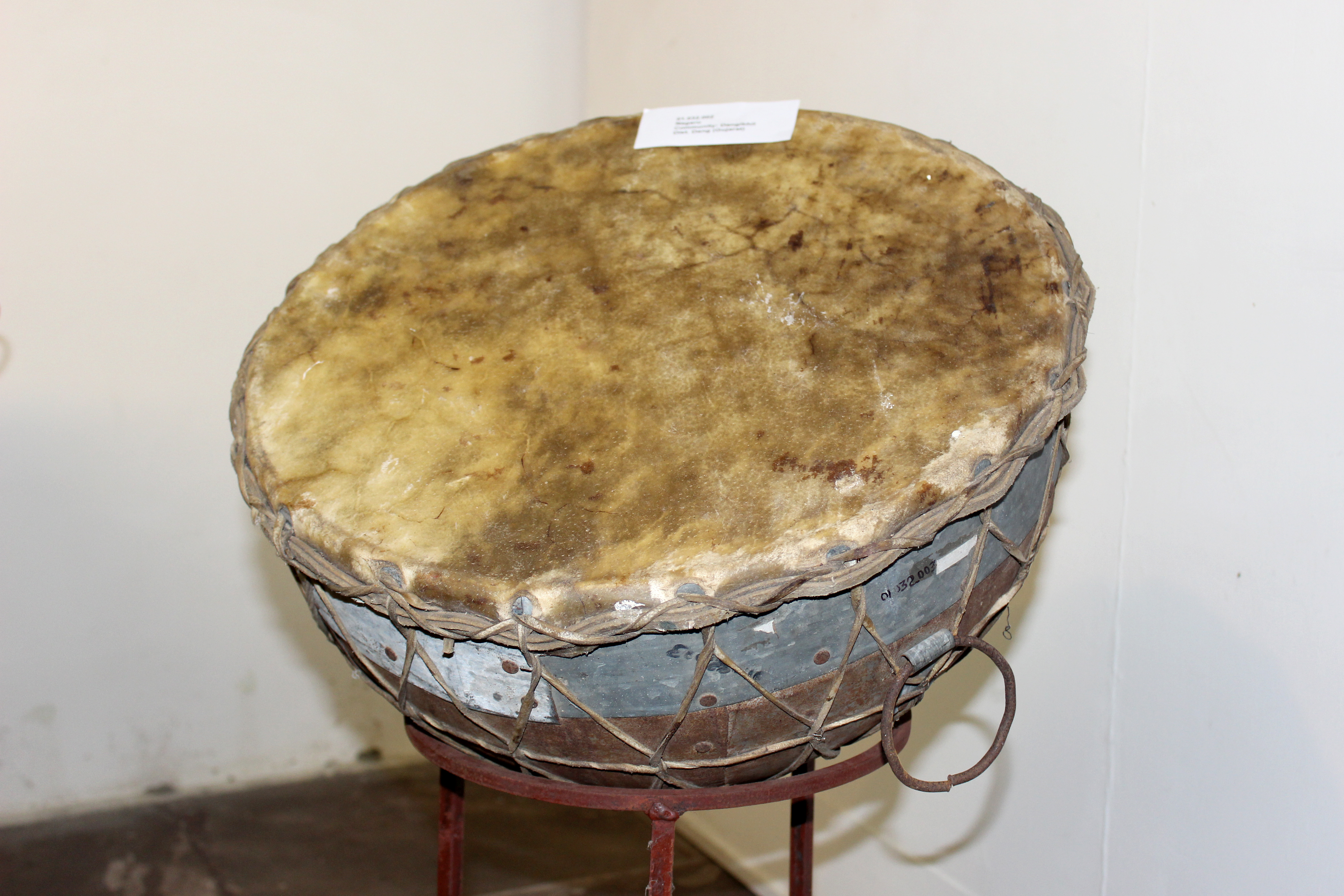
Damau resembles a smaller version of this Gujarati drum and has a flatter base.

Damau (also damaun, dhamu or dhmuva) is a single-headed drum instrument that is played extensively in the folk music of Himachal Pradesh and Uttarakhand in India. It is usually played along with the larger drum, the dhol, according to the ancient oral treatise of Dhol Sagar, which lists specific rhythm patterns for every occasion in life, including christening, wedding, religious festivals, folk drama and death rituals.
