= Mohan Upreti =

- Born: 1928; Almora, UP, British India (present-day Uttarakhand, India)
- Died: 1997 (aged 68–69); New Delhi, India
- Education: University of Allahabad, National School of Drama
- Occupations: Playwright, music composer, folk artist
- Known for: Bedu Pako Baro Masa
- Spouse: Naima Khan Upreti

Mohan Upreti (1928–1997) was an Indian theatre director, playwright and a music composer, considered one of the pioneers in Indian theatre music.

A popular figure in Kumaon, Mohan Upreti is remembered for his immense contribution towards the revitalisation of the Kumaoni folk music; and for his efforts towards preserving old Kumaoni ballads, songs and folk traditions. Upreti is best known for his song "Bedu Pako Baro Masa".

== Biography ==
=== Early life and education ===
Mohan Upreti was born in 1928 in Almora, where he also received his early education. Almora was then a quaint little town, still untouched by rapid development that the British brought to other hill stations like Nainital and Shimla. It was this environment that drew, dancer Uday Shankar to create his institute at Almora in 1937.

He was deeply influenced by trade union leaders like P. C. Joshi, who later became a prominent leader of the Communist Party of India (CPI) and also Upreti's mentor.

In the 40s, Indian People's Theatre Association (IPTA) and the Progressive Writer's Association were formed, as a response to the Indian freedom struggle by the artistic community, Mohan Upreti couldn't remain untouched by this burgeoning movement, and while still at Allahabad University he formed his theatre group, 'Lok Kalakar Sangh'.

=== Career ===
As a young man in the 1940s and 50's, Mohan Upreti travelled across Uttarakhand, along with B. M. Shah, and collected the fast vanishing folk songs, tunes, and traditions of the region to preserve them for posterity.

Upreti was instrumental in bringing the Kumaoni culture and music into national focus by establishing institutions like the Parvatiya Kala Kendra (Center for Arts of the Hills), which he constituted in Delhi, in 1968. The institution produces plays and ballads strongly rooted in the Kumaoni culture. In fact, B. M. Shah and Mohan Upreti together, are credited with the revival of the theatre in the Uttarakhand He remained in the faculty of National School of Drama (NSD), New Delhi, for many years, and also directed plays for NSD Repertory Company, where his most known work was the play, 'Indra Sabha'.

His most important work is the epic ballad 'Rajula Malushahi', published in 1980, offers never before insights into the Kumaoni folk culture. His other important plays are 'Nanda Devi Jagar', upon which he made a film as well, 'Sita Svayamvar', and 'Haru Heet'. Apart from that he also gave music for many theatre productions, including 'Ghasiram Kotwal', his music for Hindustani version of Brecht's Three Penny Opera was vastly appreciated and still remembered as his finest.

He worked for many years to revive traditional Ramlila plays and bring them to urban audiences.

He also gave music for a number of television productions in the 80's including in a series based on Ruskin Bond's stories, 'Ek Tha Rusty', where again his compositions were noticeable for the distinct Kumaoni folk touch.

He died in 1997, in New Delhi.

=== Family ===
He married Naima Khan Upreti, a graduate of National School of Drama, in 1969.

== Legacy ==
Each year on his birth anniversary, 'Parvatiya Kala Kendra', an institution set up by him, presents a new play.

In 2004, "Bedu Pako Baro Masa" – a creation of Mohan Upreti, was used in Coca-Cola commercial "Thanda Matlab Coca Cola", by Prasoon Joshi, himself from Kumaon. In the ad a "Pahari Guide" is shown humming the tune. The song is still played at Kumaoni weddings, celebrations and cultural functions and has now even become a popular mobile ringtone. It is also the marching song of the Kumaon Regiment.

In 2006, National School of Drama published his biography, titled, Mohan Upreti – The Man and His Art, written by theatre critic, Diwan Singh Bajeli.

== Bibliography ==
- Malushahi: The Ballad of Kumaon. New Delhi, Sangeet Natak Akademi (1980).

== See also ==
- Kumauni People
- Music of Uttarakhand
- Theatre in India
