= Jagar (ritual) =

Himalayan Shamanic ritual tradition

- जागर
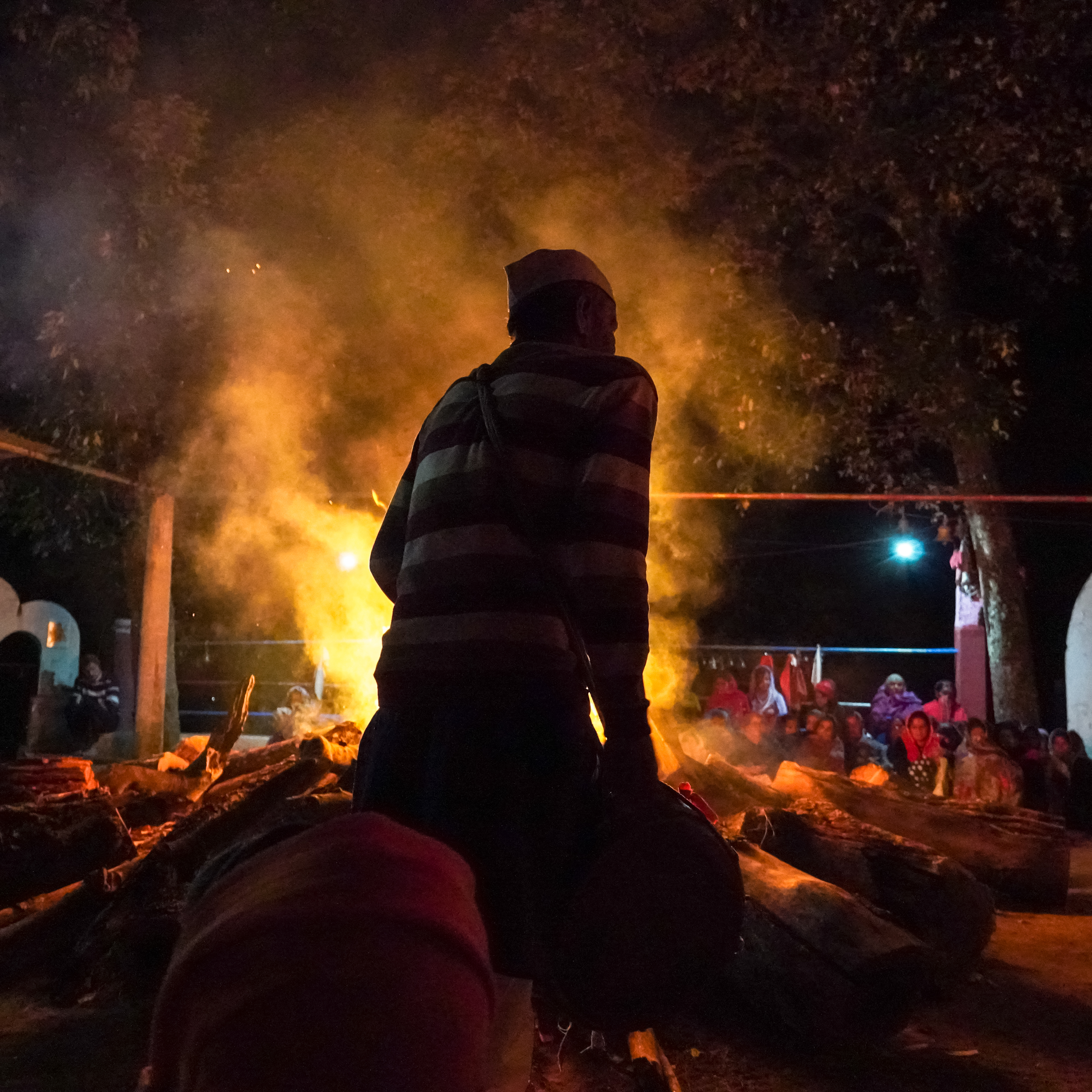
- A Jagar ritual being performed in Uttarakhand
- Type: Folk Hinduism
- Theology: Spirit invocation and ancestor worship
- Region: (Garhwal, Kumaon) Uttarakhand Sudurpashchim Province, Nepal
- Founder: Traditional Himalayan folk practice
- Origin: Ancient tradition

Jagar (Devanagari: जागर) is a Himalayan form of Folk Hinduism which is practiced in the hills of Uttarakhand, both in Garhwal and Kumaon mostly during the night. It is also practiced in Sudurpaschim province of Nepal, particularly more diversified and revered in Baitadi district.

As a ritual, Jagar is a way in which gods and local deities are woken from their dormant stage and asked for favors or remedies. The ritual is connected to the idea of divine justice and is practiced to seek penance for a crime or to seek justice from the gods for some injustice. The word Jagar comes from the Sanskrit root, Jaga, meaning "to wake".

Music is the medium through which the gods are invoked. The singer, or Jagariya, sings a ballad of the gods and heroes of the region, in which the adventures and exploits of the god being invoked are described. After evolving over time, Jagar singing has transformed into an art form that is greatly cherished, the exponents of which are often heralded as living heritage.

These traditions are part of the Himalayas. Every village had its own god, called Bhumiya or kshetrapala, protecting its boundaries. For example, in Pithoragarh district of Uttarakhand, there is a deity named Devalsamiti who is Kshetrapala of 22 villages. Each family has its own kuladeva or kuladevi. In addition, there were numerous other benevolent demigods and goddesses that could reward people, as well as malicious spirits that could torment people.

These practices are similar to shamanistic traditions prevalent in ancient rites around the world. While most of these deities have been lost or incorporated into monotheistic practices, Hinduism has strong kuladevata traditions that enabled the Jagar tradition to grow in India and Nepal. In particular, the geographical isolation of the Kumaon and Garhwal due to the Himalayas promoted the emergence of local religious traditions, which are still strong in these regions along with mainstream Hinduism.

Jagar ceremonies generally have three primary types. The first is the Dev Jagar, or the invocation of a god, which usually includes local gods occupying the body of the medium. The second is the Bhoot Jagar, or the invocation of a deceased person's spirit or soul in the medium's body. Other less frequently practiced forms include the Masan Puja.

Today, Jagar is viewed as a cultural and musical component of local heritage that needs preservation. The ritual remains highly revered, especially in rural areas and New Delhi. Delhi has a sizeable kumaoni and garhwali community spanning various generations of migrants. These communities have initiated Jagars in Delhi.

Some examples of local deities that were invoked during Jagar and are highly revered (examples only taken from Pithoragarh district)

- Devalsamiti
- Gangnath
- Asur
- Bhagwati Mata
- Kalika Mata
- Ganmeshwar
- Goril (also known as Golu devta)
- Harjyu-Samjyu
- Devtaal
- Nagarja
- Latwa
- Ulka devi

== Participants ==
=== Jagariya ===
The Jagariya (जगरिया) is the singer of the ballads of the gods who leads the rituals and invokes the gods by calling upon them. Traditionally, the role of the Jagariya was reserved strictly for men, however in the 19th century female jagariyas broke the mould and have gained acceptability since. The Jagariya is assisted by two or more men who sing along with him in chorus.

=== Dangariya ===
The Dangariya (डगरिया) is the person, whose body is used by the gods when they incarnate. The word Dangariya comes from the Kumaoni word Dangar, which means way. Both men and women can serve as Dangariyas. The Dangariya is the one who shows the way for the gods.

=== Syonkar ===
The Syonkar (स्योंकर) is the person who has organized the Jagar to seek divine intervention to his problems. The Jagar is held at the Syonkar's home.

== Duration ==
The Jagar can be organised for

- one day= "Dishunsi" (दिशूंसि)
- three days=Dhinali (धिनाली)
- four days= chauraasi (चौरासी)
- eleven days
- twenty-two days=Baisi (बैसी)

== Preparations ==
The room in which the Jagar is to be performed is purified by processes closely administered by the Jagar singer, or Jagariya.

The Dhuni (धुनी), or sacred fire, is lit for the Homa.

== Instruments ==
The musical instruments used are the Hurka (हुड़का), damaru or doonr(डोंर), Dhol (ढोल), Damau (दमाऊ), and Thali (थाली), all of which are percussion instruments native to Uttarakhand played by professional musicians.

== Rituals ==
Jagar is conducted in a designated sacred space, often an open area or a temple courtyard which is decorated with colourful rangolis and flowers. A central altar or platform holds sacred objects and offerings for the deity.

=== Sanjhwali Geet ===
In Sanjhvali Geet (साँझवली गीत), all gods are remembered, their names are repeated, and they are asked for assistance for a successful completion of the Jagar.

The following text is an excerpt from the Sanjhvali Geet of deity Gangnath (in Kumaoni language):

जै गुरु-जै गुरु
माता पिता गुरु देवत
तब तुमरो नाम छू इजाऽऽऽऽऽऽ
यो रुमनी-झूमनी संध्या का बखत में॥

तै बखत का बीच में,
संध्या जो झुलि रै।
बरम का बरम लोक में, बिष्णु का बिष्णु लोक में,
राम की अजुध्या में, कृष्ण की द्वारिका में,
यो संध्या जो झुलि रै,
शम्भु का कैलाश में,
ऊँचा हिमाल, गैला पताल में,

=== Birtwai ===
During the Birtwai (बिर्त्वाई), the divine spirit being called upon is praised, and ballads related to his or her adventures and life are sung out loud.

The following text is an excerpt from the Birtwai of deity Bala Goria (in Kumaoni language):

गोरियाऽऽऽऽऽऽ दूदाधारी छै, कृष्ण अबतारी छै।
मामू को अगवानी छै, पंचनाम द्याप्तोंक भाँणिज छै,
तै बखत का बीच में गढ़ी चम्पावती में हालराई राज जो छन,
अहाऽऽऽऽ! रजा हालराई घर में संतान न्हेंतिन,
के धान करन कूनी राजा हालराई.......!

तै बखत में राजा हालराई सात ब्या करनी.....संताना नाम पर ढुँग लै पैद नि भै,
तै बखत में रजा हालराई अठुँ ब्या जो करनु कुनी,
राजैल गंगा नाम पर गध्यार नै हाली, द्याप्ता नाम पर ढुँग जो पुजिहाली,......
अहा क्वे राणि बटिक लै पुत्र पैद नि भै.......
राज कै पुत्रक शोकै रैगो

=== Ausan ===
During the Ausan (औसाण), the beating volume of the Hurka and other instruments is slowly increased. Here, the Dagariya goes into a state of a trance with frenzied movement.

The following text is an excerpt from the Ausan of deity Gangnath (in Kumaoni language):

एऽऽऽऽऽ राजौ- क रौताण छिये......!
एऽऽऽऽऽ डोटी गढ़ो क राज कुँवर जो छिये,
अहाऽऽऽऽऽ घटै की क्वेलारी, घटै की क्वेलारी।
आबा लागी गौछौ गांगू, डोटी की हुलारी॥

डोटी की हुलारी, म्यारा नाथा रे......माँगता फकीर।
रमता रंगीला जोगी, माँगता फकीर,
ओहोऽऽऽऽ माँगता फकीर......

=== Guru Aarti ===
All gods and demigods in the local pantheon of Kumaon are believed to be disciples of Guru Gorakhnath, who is remembered and asked for protection. This ritual is known as the Guru Aarti (गुरु आरती).

The following text is an excerpt of Guru Aarti of deity Gangnath (in Kumaoni language):

ए.......तै बखत का बीच में, हरिद्वार में बार बर्षक कुम्भ जो लागि रौ।
ए...... गांगू.....! हरिद्वार जै बेर गुरु की सेवा टहल जो करि दिनु कूँछे......!
अहा.... तै बखत का बीच में, कनखल में गुरु गोरखीनाथ जो भै रईं......!
ए...... गुरु कें सिराँ ढोक जो दिना, पयाँ लोट जो लिना.....!
ए...... तै बखत में गुरु की आरती जो करण फैगो, म्यरा ठाकुर बाबा.....!

अहा.... गुरु धें कुना, गुरु......, म्यारा कान फाड़ि दियो, मून-मूनि दियो,
भगैलि चादर दि दियौ, मैं कें बिद्या भार दी दियो,
मैं कें गुरुमुखी ज बणा दियो।
ओ... दो तारी को तार-ओ दो तारी को तार,
गुरु मैंकें दियो कूँछो, बिद्या को भार,
बिद्या को भार जोगी, माँगता फकीर,
रमता रंगीला जोगी, माँगता फकीर।

=== Khakh Raman ===
The ash known as Bibhuti (बिभूति) from Homa, the fire sacrifice made to the gods, is applied on the foreheads of those present. This is known as Khakh Raman (खाख रामाण).

=== Danik Vichar ===
Danik Vichar (दाणीक विचार) means thinking about the provider. Individuals present for Danik Vichar contemplate about God and the way he provides for them.

=== Ashirvad ===
Individuals present are ritually blessed by priests who pray for their prosperity. This is known as Ashirvad (आशीर्वाद).

=== Prasthan ===
In Prasthan (प्रस्थान), the gods are said to return to their heavenly abode at the stage of the Jagar.

== Notable singers ==
- Pritam Bhartwan
- Basanti Bisht

== See also ==
- Garhwal
- Garhwali people
- Garhwali language
- Kumaon
- Kumaoni people
- Kumaoni language
