= Pritam Bhartwan =

Singer from Uttarakhand, India

Pritam Bhartwan प्रीतम भरतवाण Padma Shri
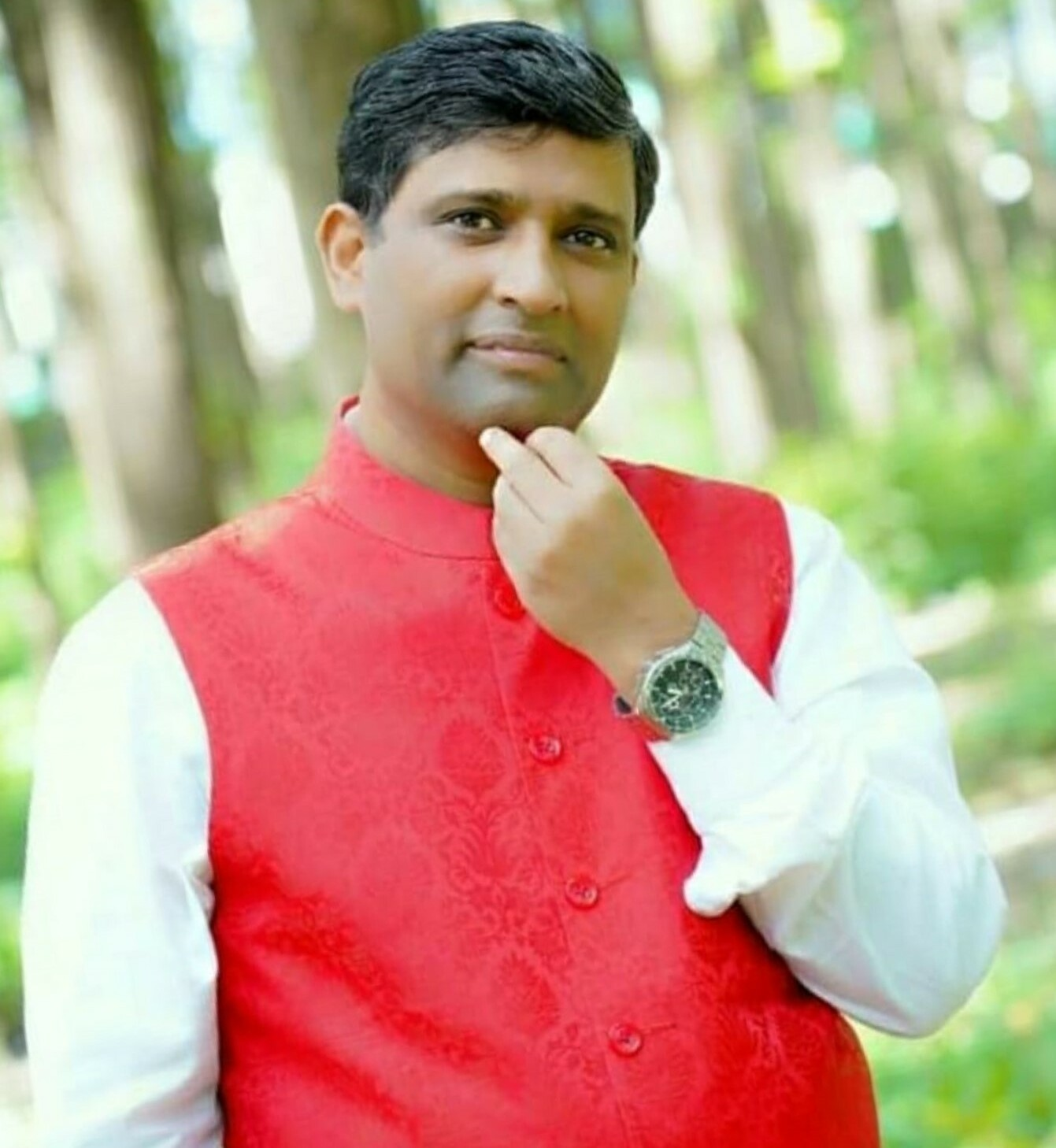

Background information
- Born: Silla village, Raipur region, Dehradun district, Uttarakhand (then Uttar Pradesh, India)
- Genres: Jagar (traditional folk ritual music)
- Occupation(s): Folk singer, music educator
- Years active: Since childhood

Pritam Bhartwan is a folk singer from Uttarakhand, India. In 2019, he was conferred the Padma Shri honour by the president of India, Ram Nath Kovind, for his contribution to the field of traditional folk art. He also known as jagar Samrat in Uttarakhand. He has received many awards by State government and central government. He is also visiting professor in Cincinnati University and University of Illinois University.

== Early life and background ==
Bhartwan was born in a village in Raipur, Uttarakhand. He began performing folk songs at the age of 13, along with his uncle. His songs follows the Jagar tradition of music.

Since 2011, he has been a guest lecturer at the University of Illinois. He has recorded over 1,000 folk songs. In 2019, he was honoured with the Padma Shri award by the President of India.

== Career ==
Bhartwan started performing publicly as a young teenager, both vocally in the Jagar tradition and on traditional folk instruments. His career includes extensive field recording and live performance work aimed at preserving and popularizing the spiritual narratives integral to Uttarakhand’s folk heritage.

He has recorded over 1,000 folk songs across roughly 30 to 50 albums, encompassing Jagars, folk geet, pawadas, and Dhol Sagar traditions.

In 2019, Bhartwan received the Padma Shri from President Ram Nath Kovind, recognizing his role in nurturing and safeguarding Uttarakhand’s traditional folk arts.

He also holds academic affiliations abroad: serving as a visiting guest lecturer at both the University of Cincinnati and the University of Illinois, where he teaches aspects of Pahadi folk music and cultural traditions.

He founded the Hem Lok Kala Kendra, an institute dedicated to teaching Jagar, Pawada, Dhol Sagar, and related musical traditions, aiming to pass them on to younger generations.

In October 2021, the Uttarakhand government, led by Chief Minister Pushkar Singh Dhami, inaugurated the Pritam Bhartwan Jagar Dhol Sagar International Academy in Dehradun, providing financial support and free training to students and researchers in regional folk music and instruments.

In 2024, the Chief Minister of Uttarakhand released a biography titled "Uttarakhand ka Lok Putra Pritam Bhartwan", describing him as the “brand ambassador of Uttarakhand’s folk culture”.

== Musical style and cultural significance ==
Pritam Bhartwan’s repertoire is rooted in the Jagar ritual tradition - a shamanic folk practice involving devotional ballads, invoked deities, and storytelling through music. His performances are noted to preserve the oral tradition while incorporating musical authenticity, positioning him as a living custodian of this heritage.

== Recognition and influence ==
His designation as Jagar Samrat, along with the Padma Shri, reflect widespread acknowledgment of his role in cultural preservation. The inauguration of the academy and the publication of his biography further signify his standing as a regional cultural icon and educator.
