= Garhwal kingdom =

Monarchy in Himalayan (823–1949)

Coordinates: 30.38°N 78.48°E

Garhwal Kingdom गढ़वाल राज्य (Garhwali)
- 823–1949
- Flag

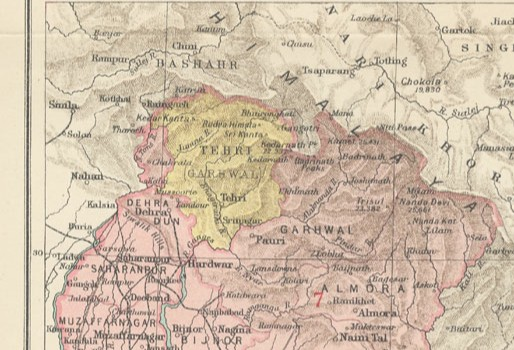
- Tehri Garhwal State in The Imperial Gazetteer of India
- Status: Sovereign state (823 - 1654); Tributary of the Mughal Empire (1655 onwards); Governorate of the Kingdom of Nepal (1804 - 1816); Princely state of the British India (1816 - 1949)
- Capital: Chandpur Garhi (888–1512 CE); Devalgarh (1512–1517 CE); Srinagar (1517–1804 CE); Tehri (1816–1862 CE); Pratapnagar (1862–1890 CE); Kirtinagar (1890–1925 CE); Narendranagar (1925–1947 CE)
- Common languages: Garhwali
- Religion: Hinduism
- Demonym: Garhwali
- Government: Monarchy
- Maharaja
  - 823: Kanak Pal (first)
  - 1684–1716 (peak): Fateh Shah
  - 1946–1949: Manabendra Shah (last)
- History
  - Established: 823
  - Conquered by the Gorkhas and merged with the Kingdom of Nepal: 1804
  - Established as a Princely state of British India following the Treaty of Sugauli: 1816
  - Acceded to India and joined the Union of India: 1949
| Preceded by | Succeeded by |
| Kuninda kingdom; Katyuri dynasty | Dominion of India |
- Today part of: Garhwal division, Uttarakhand, India

Kingdom of Garhwal, was also known as Tehri Garhwal, was a princely state under British paramountcy in the current north-western Himalayan state of Uttarakhand, India, founded in 823 CE by Kanak Pal the progenitor of the Panwar dynasty that ruled over the kingdom uninterrupted until 1803 CE.

The princely state was divided into two parts during the British Raj, namely: the princely state of Garhwal and the Garhwal District of British India. The princely state of Garhwal consisted of the present day Tehri Garhwal district and most of the Uttarkashi district. This former state acceded to the Union of India in August 1949 CE.

== History ==
=== Ancient ===
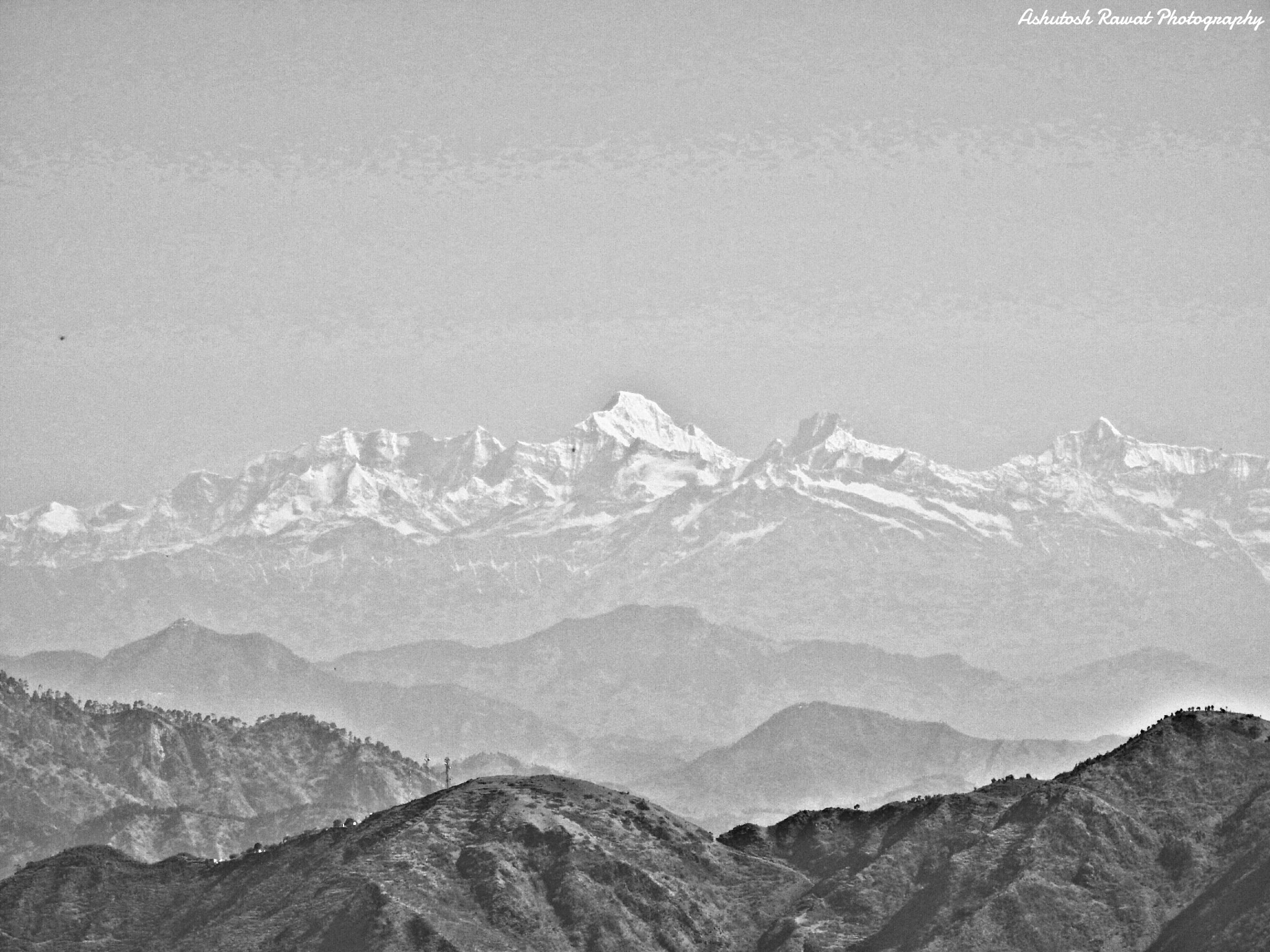
Garhwal Himalaya

The royal dynasty of Garhwal started with Kanak Pal. Garhwal Kingdom was founded in 823 AD, when Kanak Pal, the prince of Malwa (present day Madhya Pradesh), on his visit to the Badrinath Temple, met Raja Bhanu Pratap, the ruler of Chandpur Garhi, one of the 52 Garhs of Garhwal. Raja Bhanu Pratap had no sons. The King married his only daughter to the prince and subsequently handed over his kingdom, the fortress town. Kanak Pal and his descendants of Panwar dynasty, gradually conquered all the independent fortresses (Garhs) belonging to its 52 small chieftains, and ruled the whole of Garhwal Kingdom for the next 916 years, up to 1804 AD.

=== Medieval ===
In 1358, the 37th ruler, Ajay Pal, brought all the minor principalities for the Garhwal region, under his own rule, and founded the Garhwal Kingdom, with Devalgarh as its capital, which he later shifted to Srinagar. Balbhadra Shah (r. 1575–1591), was the first Raja of Garhwal to use the title Shah. The capital was shifted to Srinagar by Mahipat Shah who ascended to the throne in 1622, and further consolidated his rule over most parts of Garhwal, though he died early in 1631, though his seven-year-old son, Prithvi Shah ascended to the throne after him, the Kingdom was ruled by Mahipat Shah's wife, Rani Karnavati for many years to come, during which she successfully defended the kingdom against invaders and repelled an attack of Mughal army led by Najabat Khan in 1640, and in time received the nickname of 'Nakti Rani' as she used to chop off the noses of any invader to the kingdom, as the Mughal invaders of the period realised.

The next important ruler was Fateh Shah, remained the King of Garhwal from 1684 to 1716, and is most known for taking part in the Battle of Bhangani on 18 September 1688, where combined forces of many Rajas of the Shivalik Hills (Pahari rajas) fought with 10th Sikh Guru Gobind Singh's army. During his reign, Sikh Guru and the ex-communicated eldest son of Har Rai, Ram Rai settled here, upon recommendations of Aurangzeb, which eventually led to the establishment of modern town of Dehradun. Fateh Shah died in 1716, and his son Upendra Shah died within a year of ascending to the throne in 1717, subsequently Pradip Shah ascended and his rule led to rising fortunes of the Kingdom, this in turn attracted invaders, like Najib-ud-daula Governor of Saharanpur, who invaded in 1757 along with his Rohilla Army and captured Dehradun. However, in 1770, the Garhwali forces defeated the Rohillas and retrieved possession of the Dun region.

In 1791 Gorkha forces of the Kingdom of Nepal, invaded Kumaon and took control of most of the hill country, expelling or subduing most of the rajas.

=== Twelve-year Gorkha occupation (Gorkhyani) ===
The Garhwal kings went into exile in British territory as the Gorkhas began their twelve-year rule over Garhwal region.

The Gorkhas ruled Garhwal with an iron fist. Their excessive taxation policy, iniquitous judicial system, slavery, torture and lack of civilised administrative set up made the Gorkha rulers extremely unpopular amongst their subjects. Cultivation declined rapidly and villages were deserted. During the Gorkha rule, a revenue settlement for Garhwal was undertaken in 1811. The rates were so high that the land-owners found it difficult to honour, and the Gorkhas sold hundreds of their family members into slavery in satisfaction of the arrears. If a person or his family members were not purchased as slaves in auction, such people were sent to Bhimgoda near Har Ki Pauri, Haridwar for selling. The Gorkhas are said to have established a slave market at Das Bazar in Haridwar. Harak Dev Joshi, a prominent minister from the Kumaon court wrote letters to Fraser, the resident at Delhi describing the atrocities committed by the Gorkhas on the Garhwali people. British writer and explorer Captain F.V. Raper (of the 10th Bengal) has written an eye-witness account of it in the Asiatic Researches (vol. xi.):

At the foot of the pass leading from Har Ki Pauri is a Gurkhali 'chauki' or post, to which slaves are brought down from the hills and exposed for sale. Many hundreds of these poor wretches, of both sexes, from three to thirty years of age, are annually disposed of in the way of traffic. These slaves are brought down from all parts of the interior of the hills, and sold at Haridwar at from 10 to 150 rupees.

— F. V. Raper

Scottish travel writer and artist, J. B. Fraser wrote:

The Gorkhas ruled Garhwal with a rod of iron and the country fell into a lamentable decay. Its villages became deserted, its agriculture ruined and its population decreased beyond computation. It is said that two lakhs, (200,000) of people were sold as slaves, while few families of consequence remained in the country; but, to avoid the severity of the tyranny, they either went into banishment or were cut off or forcibly driven away by their tyrant.

— J. B. Fraser, British Garhwal – A Gazetteer – Volume XXXVI

The Mukhtiyar (prime minister) of Nepal, Bhimsen Thapa imposed a general restriction on human trafficking in Garhwal, Sirmur and other areas in 1812 A.D. Anti-bribery regulations were issued against regional governors and declared it illegal to give or take any form of bribes or gifts from people. He established Hulak (postal) system through a relay of porters up to Yamuna river in Garhwal. Regulations issued in July 1809 states:

In areas west of Bheri river and east of Jamuna river, make an estimate of the amount required for payment to Hulaki porters employed for the transport of mail on the basis of sum sanctioned in the previous order and the sum required according to arrangements made this year for different areas and submit a report accordingly.

The royal court sent the following orders regarding abolition of slave trading:

Let not there be injustice in any matter. We had sent orders previously also banning the sale of the children of the subjects, but it seems that the practice has not been abandoned. You are, therefore, ordered to maintain checkposts and do whatever is necessary to put an end to the practice. Any person who is caught while trafficking in human beings shall be punished according to the previous order.

— Royal orders to Sardar Bhakti Thapa, Sardar Chandrabir Kunwar and Subba Shrestha Thapa on Baisakh Sudi 3, 1866 V.S.

=== Defeat of the Gorkhas and split of Garhwal Kingdom ===
The occupation of the kingdom by the Gorkhas went unopposed from 1803 to 1814 until a series of encroachments by the Gorkhas on British territory led to the Anglo-Nepalese War in 1814. Sudarshan Shah, son and heir of the defeated ruler of the Kingdom of Garhwal who was in exile in British territory, saw his chance and entered into an alliance with the British in 1812. When the expected war erupted, he joined forces with them in the conquest of the hill territories. At the war's end on 21 April 1815, as a result of the Treaty of Sugauli, the British annexed half of the Kingdom of Garhwal (Pauri Garhwal) and converted the other half (Tehri Garhwal) into a subsidiary princely state.

==== Formation of the Princely State of Tehri Garhwal ====
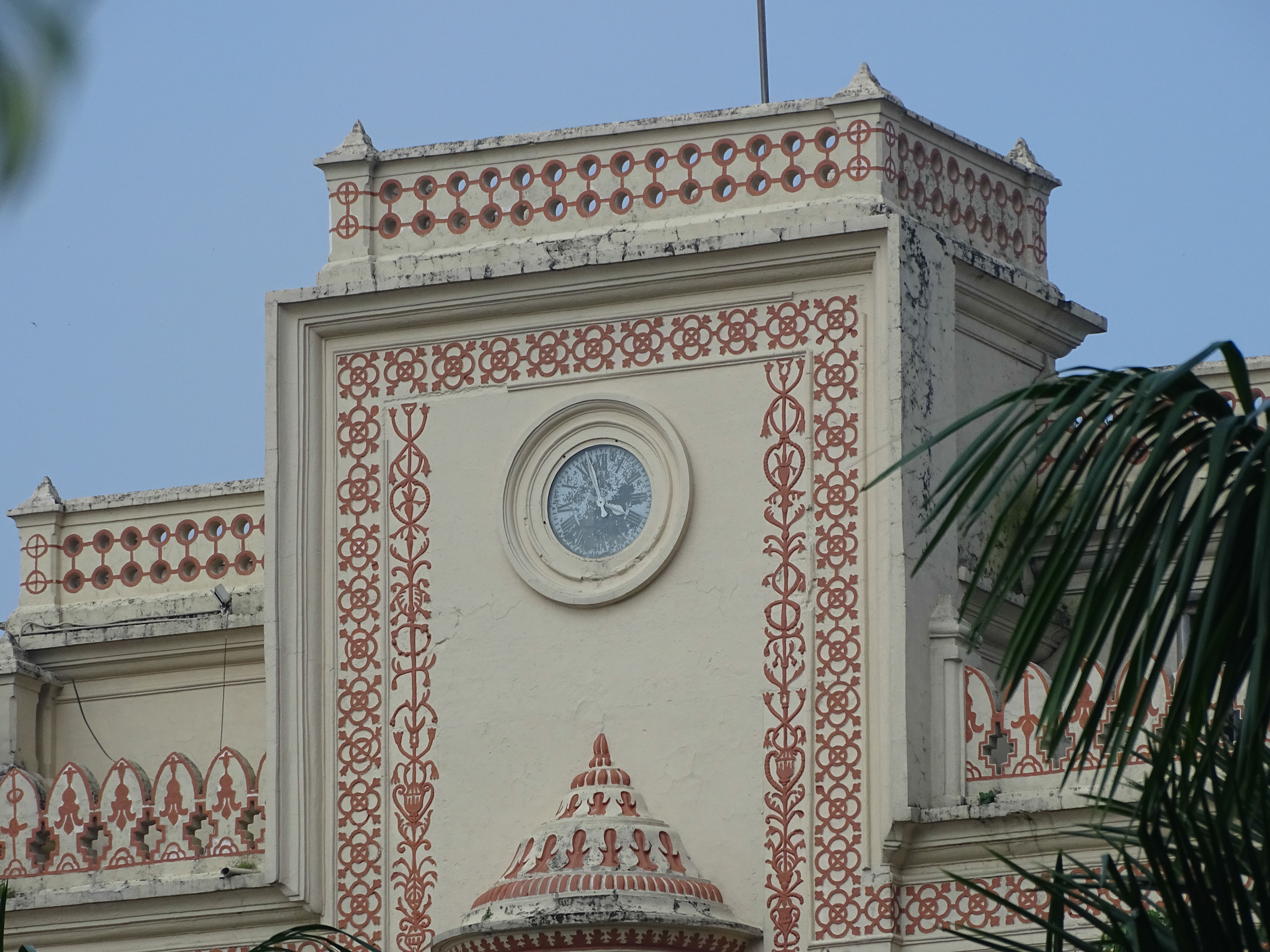
Royal Palace at Narendra Nagar

Sudarshan Shah, the heir to the Kingdom of Garhwal received approximately half his ancestral territories, limited to western Garhwal region and received recognition as Raja of a new princely state of Garhwal. The British established their rule over the eastern half of the Garhwal region, which lies east of Alaknanda and Mandakini river, which was later on known as British Garhwal and Dehradun, along with Kumaon, which was merged with British India as a result of the Treaty of Sugauli. The former Kumaon Kingdom was joined with the eastern half of the Garhwal region and was governed as a chief-commissionership, also known as the Kumaon Province, on the non-regulation system.

Since the capital Srinagar was now part of the British Garhwal, a new capital was established at Tehri, giving the name of Tehri state (popularly known as Tehri Garhwal).

Sudarshan Shah died in 1859, and was succeeded by Bhawani Shah, who in turn was succeeded by Pratap Shah in 1872. The kingdom had an area of 4,180 square miles (10,800 km^{2}), and a population of 268,885 in 1901. The ruler was given the title of Raja, but after 1913, he was honoured with the title of Maharaja. The King was entitled to an 11 gun salute and had a privy purse of 300,000 Rupees. In 1919, Maharaja Narendra Shah shifted the capital from Tehri to a new town, which was named after him, Narendranagar.

=== India's independence ===
During the Quit India Movement people from this region actively worked for the independence of India. Ultimately, when the country was declared independent in 1947, the inhabitants of Tehri Riyasat (Garhwal State) started their movement to free themselves from the clutches of the Maharaja Narendra Shah (Panwar).

Due to this movement, the situation became out of his control and it was difficult for him to rule over the region. Consequently, the 60th king of Panwar dynasty, Manabendra Shah, the last ruling Maharaja of the Garhwal Kingdom (1946–1949), accepted the sovereignty of the Union of India. Tehri Riyasat was merged into the Garhwal District of United Provinces (later renamed to Uttar Pradesh) and was given the status of a new district, the Tehri Garhwal district. Subsequently, on 24 February 1960, the state government separated one of its tehsils which was given the status of a separate district named Uttarkashi. It is currently part of the Garhwal Division of the Uttarakhand state of India which was carved out of Uttar Pradesh in 2000. Former royal palace of the Maharaja of Tehri Garhwal at Narendranagar, now houses the Ananda in the Himalayas spa, established 2000.

== Flag of Garhwal ==
The flag of Garhwal was known as Badrinathji Ki Pataka or Garuda Dhwaj. It was in use since pre-1803 as a symbol of Garhwal State; and continued to be used from 1803 to 1949 as the symbol of princely state of Garhwal, (a.k.a. Tehri Garhwal / Garhwal Raj). After 1949, this flag is the symbol of Royal family and Lord Badrinath. The colour scheme is two equal stripes of white (top) and green (bottom) horizontally placed and the symbol used was Garuda (the celestial vehicle of Lord Vishnu). White stands for purity, peace, tranquillity with snow as an additional meaning for Himalayan state. Green stands for agriculture, greenery, prosperity and progress. According to Filcher11 (1984), the colours represent the snow of the Himalaya and the forests of the state. In the centre the crest of the coat of arms is placed – an eagle with expanded wings (Garuda) is the vehicle of Lord Badrinath / Vishnu with emphasis on Garhwal being God's own abode.

"As Garuda is where Lord Vishnu is, it celebrates association of Garhwal with Lord Vishnu. As Lord Himself has a role sustaining the world, the state of Garhwal is sustained by support of God. It is in a pose with expanded wings which shows readiness and preparation to soar high. Thus it gives a meaning of divinity, majesty and ambitious preparedness with readiness to embark on great undertakings."

This verse was used with special fervour in Garhwal due to the Flag being Garuda Dhwaj. The verse was used by ruler of princely state himself while bidding farewell to state forces.

== Rulers of Garhwal ==
According to Atkinson, there are four chronological lists of the Parmar rulers of Garhwal.

Mola Ram the 18th century painter, poet, historian and diplomat of Garhwal wrote the historical work Garhrajvansh Ka Itihas (History of the Garhwal royal dynasty) which is the only source of information about several Garhwal rulers.

Rulers of Garhwal – Panwar Dynasty Rulers
| No. | Name | Reign | Portrait | No. | Name | Reign | Portrait | No. | Name | Portrait | Reign |
|---|---|---|---|---|---|---|---|---|---|---|---|
| 1 | Kanak Pal | 688–699 | | 21 | Vikram Pal | 1116–1131 | | 41 | Vijay Pal | | 1426–1437 |
| 2 | Shyam Pal | 699–725 | | 22 | Vichitra Pal | 1131–1140 | | 42 | Sahaj Pal | | 1437–1473 |
| 3 | Pandu Pal | 725–756 | | 23 | Hans Pal | 1141–1152 | | 43 | Bahadur Shah | | 1473–1498 |
| 4 | Abhijat Pal | 756–780 | | 24 | Som Pal | 1152–1159 | | 44 | Man Shah | | 1498–1518 |
| 5 | Saugat Pal | 781–800 | | 25 | Kadil Pal | 1159–1164 | | 45 | Shyam Shah | | 1518–1527 |
| 6 | Ratna Pal | 800–850 | | 26 | Kamadev Pal | 1172–1179 | | 46 | Mahipat Shah | | 1527–1552 |
| 7 | Shali Pal | 850–857 | | 27 | Sulakshan Dev | 1179–1197 | | 47 | Prithvi Shah | | 1552–1614 |
| 8 | Vidhi Pal | 858–877 | | 28 | Lakhan Dev | 1197–1220 | | 48 | Medini Shah | | 1614–1660 |
| 9 | Madan Pal | 887–895 | | 29 | Anand Pal II | 1220–1241 | | 49 | Fateh Shah | | 1660–1708 |
| 10 | Bhakti Pal | 895–919 | | 30 | Purva Dev | 1241–1260 | | 50 | Upendra Shah | | 1708–1709 |
| 11 | Jayachand Pal | 920–948 | | 31 | Abhay Dev | 1260–1267 | | 51 | Pradip Shah | | 1709–1772 |
| 12 | Prithvi Pal | 949–971 | | 32 | Jayaram Dev | 1267–1290 | | 52 | Lalit Shah | | 1772–1780 |
| 13 | Medinisen Pal | 973–995 | | 33 | Asal Dev | 1290–1299 | | 53 | Jayakrit Shah | | 1780–1786 |
| 14 | Agasti Pal | 995–1014 | | 34 | Jagat Pal | 1299–1311 | | 54 | Pradyumna Shah | | 1786–1804 |
| 15 | Surati Pal | 1015–1036 | | 35 | Jit Pal | 1311–1330 | | 55 | Sudarshan Shah | | 1815–1859 |
| 16 | Jay Pal | 1037–1055 | | 36 | Anant Pal II | 1330–1358 | | 56 | Bhawani Shah | | 1859–1871 |
| 17 | Anant Pal I | 1056–1072 | | 37 | Ajay Pal | 1358–1389 | | 57 | Pratap Shah | | 1871–1886 |
| 18 | Anand Pal I | 1072–1083 | | 38 | Kalyan Shah | 1389–1398 | | 58 | Kirti Shah | | 1886–1913 |
| 19 | Vibhog Pal | 1084–1101 | | 39 | Sundar Pal | 1398–1413 | | 59 | Narendra Shah | | 1913–1946 |
| 20 | Suvayanu Pal | 1102–1115 | | 40 | Hansadev Pal | 1413–1426 | | 60 | Manabendra Shah | | 1946–1949 |

== Accession to India ==
Manabendra Shah was the last Maharaja of Tehri Garhwal before the princely state joined the newly independent India in 1947. He succeeded to the throne when his father Narendra Shah abdicated throne (on health grounds) on 26 May 1946. Manabendra Shah known as 'Bolanda Badri' (living incarnation of Lord Vishnu) was the 60th guardian of the temple of Badrinath in Garhwal. After serving on the Burma Front during the Second World War and retiring as a Lieutenant Colonel from the British Indian Army, Manabendra Shah ruled the 4,800-square mile only Tehri Garhwal State from 1946 until 1949, but was proud of having been one of the first to sign the Instrument of Accession, which he had helped to negotiate, with the Government of India. After the independence of India, he was a long-serving member of the Parliament of India, first as an Indian National Congress MP and later as a Bharatiya Janata Party MP. He represented Tehri Garhwal constituency eight times in the Lok Sabha. Manabendra Shah also served as Indian ambassador to Ireland from 1980 to 1983.

His son Manujendra Shah campaigned unsuccessfully to succeed to his father's Lok Sabha seat representing the Bharatiya Janata Party (BJP) in 2007. Manujendra Shah's wife, Mala Rajya Laxmi Shah, is the current BJP MP from Tehri Garhwal. In 2017, she and her husband, Manujendra Shah, passed on the royal baton to their daughter, Kshirja Kumari Devi in a ceremony on Vasant Panchami at the Ananda Palace in Narendranagar to anoint her as heir to the titular royal legacy.

== 52 garh of Garhwal ==
The term Garh means fort in Hindi. The region of Garhwal derives its name from the 52 forts (Garhs) that existed during medieval times. These forts were ruled by local chieftains, clans, and small principalities. In the 14th century, Raja Ajay Pal of the Parmar dynasty unified these scattered principalities into a single kingdom, thus forming the Garhwal Kingdom.

| No | GARH | |
|---|---|---|
| 1 | Chandpur Garh | |
| 2 | Kandara Garh | of the Kandaras |
| 3 | Deval Garh | Raja Deval's |
| 4 | Nag Nath Garh | Nag dynasty |
| 5 | Poli Garh | of the Bachwan Bishts |
| 6 | Khar Garh | of the Khar caste |
| 7 | Phalyan Garh | of the Phalyan Brahmins |
| 8 | Bangar Garh | Nag Vanshi Ranas |
| 9 | Kuili Garh | Sajwans |
| 10 | Bharpur Garh | Sajwans |
| 11 | Kujjari Garh | Sajwans |
| 12 | Sil Garh | Sajwans |
| 13 | Lodh Garh | of Lodi |
| 14 | Raika Garh | of Ramolas |
| 15 | Mungara Garh | Rawats |
| 16 | Upu Garh | Chauhans |
| 17 | Molya Garh | Ramolas |
| 18 | Sankari Garh | Ranas |
| 19 | Nala Garh | in Dehradun |
| 20 | Rani Garh | Ranas |
| 21 | Viralta Garh | Rawats |
| 22 | Chaunda Garh | Chaum |
| 23 | Rani Garh | Khatris |
| 24 | Tope Garh | Topewals |
| 25 | Sri Guru Garh | Padiyar |
| 26 | Lobha garh | Lobhan Negis |
| 27 | Badhan Garh | Badhan caste |
| 28 | Dusholi Garh | Manwar king |
| 29 | Dhauna Garh | Dhouniyals |
| 30 | Langur Garh | |
| 31 | Vag Garh | Vagli Negi |
| 32 | Triya Garh | Triya caste |
| 33 | Purusa Garh | |
| 34 | Lodan Garh | |
| 35 | Ratan Garh | Dhamoda caste |
| 36 | Garkot Garh | Bagarwal Bisht |
| 37 | Garhtang Garh | Bhotiyas |
| 38 | Van Garh | |
| 39 | Bhardav Garh | |
| 40 | Chaundkot Garh | Chaundkotis |
| 41 | Nayal Garh | Nayals |
| 42 | Ajmeer Garh | Payals |
| 43 | Sawli Garh | |
| 44 | Badalpur Garh | |
| 45 | Sangela Garh | Sangela Bisht |
| 46 | Gujaroo | |
| 47 | Jaunt Garh | |
| 48 | Jaunpur Garh | |
| 49 | Champa Garh | |
| 50 | Kara Garh | |
| 51 | Bhuwana Garh | |
| 52 | Kanda Garh | Rawats |

== See also ==
- Garhwali language
- Garhwali people
- List of Hindu empires and dynasties
- List of Rajput dynasties
- Tehri Garhwal House
