= Edward Gardner =

Edward Gardner may refer to:

- Edward W. Gardner (1867–1932), American balkline and straight rail billiards champion
- Edward Joseph Gardner (1898–1950), U.S. Representative from Ohio
- Ed Gardner (1901–1963), American actor, director and writer
- Edward Gardner (minister) (1907–2006), American minister and civil rights leader with the Alabama Christian Movement for Human Rights
- Edward Gardner (British politician) (1912–2001), British Conservative politician
- Ted Gardner (1946/1947–2021), Australian businessman
- Edward Gardner (conductor) (born 1974), British conductor

== See also ==
- Edward Gardner House, building
