= Morris Brown (disambiguation) =

Morris Brown (1770–1849) was one of the founders of the African Methodist Episcopal Church.

Morris Brown may also refer to:

- Morris Brown College, a private Methodist historically black liberal arts college, named for the founder
- Morris Brown (song), a 2006 single by OutKast featuring Scar, Sleepy Brown and Janelle Monae, named for the college
- Morris Brown Jr. (1842–1864), American soldier and Medal of Honor recipient
- Morris D. Brown (1876–1944), American carom billiards champion
