= Serica guidoi =

Scientific classification
- Kingdom: Animalia
- Phylum: Arthropoda
- Class: Insecta
- Order: Coleoptera
- Suborder: Polyphaga
- Infraorder: Scarabaeiformia
- Family: Scarabaeidae
- Genus: Serica
- Species: S. guidoi

Binomial name
- Serica guidoi Ahrens, 1999

Species of beetle

Serica guidoi is a species of beetle of the family Scarabaeidae. It is found from central Nepal to Sikkim, with a disjunct occurrence in the Garhwal District (Kumaon Himalaya).

== Description ==
Adults reach a length of about 6.1-9.4 mm. They have a reddish-brown, elongate body, with dark spots on the pronotum and elytra. The legs are reddish-brown and the antennae are yellowish. The upper surface is mostly dull and there are a few hairs on the dorsal surface.

== Etymology ==
The species is named after one of its collectors, Guido Sabatinelli.
