= Kanak Pal =

Raja of Garhwal

- Raja; Founder of Garhwal Kingdom

King of Garhwal
- Reign: 699 AD
- Coronation: 699 AD
- Predecessor: Raja Son Pal (as ruler of Chandpur Garhi)
- Successor: Raja Shyam Pal
- Born: Malwa Kingdom, (present-day Madhya Pradesh)
- Died: Garhwal Kingdom, (present-day Himachal Pradesh)
- Spouse: Only daughter of Raja Son Pal
- Issue: Raja Shyam Pal
- House: Panwar
- Dynasty: Parmara dynasty
- Father: Aagnivansh
- Religion: Hinduism

Kanak Pal also known as Raja Kanakpal was a prince of Paramara dynasty of Malwa (Madhya Pradesh) who was later crowned Heir to Raja Son Pal (his Father-In-Law). He later laid the foundation of Garhwal Kingdom. He was the first independent ruler of the entire Kingdom of Garhwal. There are A.S.I. accounts stating he reigned in 699 AD or earlier.

== Life and background ==
Kanak Pal was primarily a prince of Paramara dynasty, belonging to Malwa or in modern-day Madhya Pradesh. He was on Garhwal's journey to fulfill mandatory religious duties of Pilgrimage. The state reigning king "Son Pal (a.k.a Bhanu Pratap)", was influenced by him and he placed Kanak Pal on his throne of Garhwal - Kingdom of Kedar Khand. Before Pal's coronation came into existence, the entire kingdom was split into small parts. After coronation on the throne, he started conquering divided parts and ultimately, led the foundation of Garhwal Kingdom and merged the bifurcated parts into one.

== Diplomacy ==
The practice of arranging administrative reforms were not much different from other rulers. Before entering in the state, the divided-territory was ruled by several independent families known as "Rana", "Thakur" and "Rai". When he stabilized his throne diplomatically with the help of his descendants, he emerged as the one independent king by conquering the other parts.

== Marriage ==
The foundation of Garhwal Kingdom began when he married Son Pal (a.k.a Bhanu Pratap)'s daughter. When reigning king "Son Pal (a.k.a Bhanu Pratap)", was searching a groom for his daughter, he was reported about the Kanak Pal's presence at the Badrinath temple where prince was performing religious duties. Pratap offered a marriage proposal to prince to marry his daughter but he declined citing some issues. Upon introducing to princess, he couldn't prevent himself from accepting the proposal and ultimately agreed to marry his daughter. After getting married, the responsibilities of Kingdom of Kedar Khand was taken by Kanak Pal.
