= Hasti Dal Shah =

Hasti Dal Shah or Hastidal Chautariya was a Nepalese warrior at Anglo-Nepalese war from the family of Shah Dynasty of Gorkha. He was called upon as an able commander on the Almora Front during the Anglo-Nepalese war. His death was followed by the ultimate fall of Gorkha forces in Almora.

== Background ==
He was born to Birbaha Shah. He was grandson of Maharaj Adhirajkumar Chandrarup Shah, 4th son of King Prithvipati Shah of Gorkha. His three brothers were Governor Bam Shah, Dilip Shah, and Rudra Bir Shah.

== Life and Death ==
At the Anglo-Nepalese war, his brother Bam Shah was the governor of Kumaun. He reached Almoda with a small body of reinforcements. Four companies sent from Kathmandu to aid the beleaguered defences of Kumaun were delayed. Hastidal and 500 Nepalese Army men moved from Almoda to secure Almoda's northern line of communications with Kathmandu. This party was intercepted. Hastidal, the ablest commander was killed in the early moments of the attack.
