= Rani Karnavati of Garhwal =

Karnavati
- Rani
- Spouse: Mahipat Shah
- Issue: Prithvipati Shah

Rani Karnavati Parmar of Garhwal Kingdom, also known as Tehri Garhwal, was an Indian aristocrat of the 17th century. She is known for having been the wife of Mahipat Shah (or Mahipati Shah), the Rajput king of Garhwal who used the title Shah.

The capital of Garhwal Kingdom was shifted from Dewalgarh to Srinagar, Uttarakhand by him, who ascended to the throne in 1622 and further consolidated his rule over most parts of Garhwal.

Though King Mahipati Shah died young in 1631, after his death his wife, Rani Karnavati, ruled the kingdom on the behalf of her very young seven-year-old son, Prithvipati Shah. She ruled over for many years to come, during which she successfully defend the kingdom against invaders and repelled an invasion of Mughal army of Shah Jahan led by the general Najabat Khan in 1640. According to Niccolao Manucci she ordered captured Mughal soldiers to chop off their noses or die. The soldiers threw down their weapons and left, leaving their noses behind. Shah Jahan gave an order that ever afterwards she should be spoken of as the nak-kati rani, 'cut-nose'. Najabat Khan, who could not endure coming back with his nose cut off, took poison and put an end to his life. Rani Karnavati got the advantage of geographical location of its Small Kingdom Of Uttrakhand because Mughal army was not aware about mountains war techniques like Guirilla technique that's why Najabat Khan had to Sign peace treaty with Rani Karnavati.

Monuments erected by her still exist in Dehradun district at Nawada, she is also credited with the construction of the Rajpur Canal, the earliest of all the Dehradun canals, which starts from the Rispana River and brings its waters till the city of Dehradun. Rispana River is one of the tributaries of Song river that drains the central and eastern part of the Doon Valley.

Some years later her grown up son Prithvipati came to the throne and ruled wisely under his mother's influence.
