= Bam Shah =

Nepalese politician

Sri Chautaria Bam Shah or Brahma Shah was an administrator of Nepal. He belongs to Shah Dynasty of Gorkha. He was Governor of Kumaun Province during Anglo-Nepalese war.

== Background ==
He was born to Birbaha Shah. He was grandson of Maharaj Adhirajkumar Chandrarup Shah, 4th son of King Prithvipati Shah of Gorkha. His 3 brothers were Dilip Shah, Hasti Dal Shah (killed in the Anglo-Nepalese war) and Rudra Bir Shah.

== Works ==
He was a Minister of State in 1800 A.D. and the Governor of Kumaun from 1814 to 1815 A.D. at Anglo-Nepalese war. Out at west Nepalese were hopelessly overextended. Kumaun, a key link in Nepal Army communications with Far West was defended by around 750 Nepalese with equal number of Kumauni irregulars, altogether 1500 men to defend a whole province. Doti which was east of Kumaun had been practically stripped out of troops. Governor Bam Shah had full responsibility of defense of the province. British force numbering initially over 4500 men was easily able to out maneuver Nepalese Army defenders and had to abandon one post after another. Despite significant victory over Captain Hearsey's force which had been sent in flanking movement through Eastern Kumaun and the capture of captain himself, Bam Shah's Nepalese force couldn't stern the tide of British advance.

Meanwhile, Lord Hastings sent Colonel Nicolls, Quartermaster-General for all British force in India, to take charge of Almoda campaign and assigned 2000 army men with large irregulars against 1000 Nepalese. Bam Shah's brother Hasti Dal Shah arrived with 500 men were intercepted at Almoda's Northern Line of Communications with Kathmandu. Hastidal was killed at the first moments and Nepalese suffered heavy losses. The news reached Almoda Fort which was under responsibility of Bam Shah. British was able to establish gun positions at seventy yards from gate of fort of Almoda and the British artillery demolished walls of fort at point blank range. Bam Shah surrendered Almoda on 27 April 1815 A.D. He then sent letter to Bada Kaji Amar Singh Thapa who was Supreme Commander of Western Front, about the fall of Almora.

== Post-War Border Disputes ==
Following the conclusion of the Anglo-Nepalese War and the signing of the Treaty of Sugauli (1815–1816), Bam Shah was heavily involved in diplomatic efforts to adjust Nepal's western border with the East India Company. The treaty had stipulated that the Kali River would serve as the new western boundary. In 1817, Bam Shah made a formal representation to the British claiming Nepalese entitlement to territories in the Byans region. While the British agreed to transfer the villages of Tinkar and Chhangru to Nepal, Bam Shah subsequently extended his claim further west to the Kuthi Valley and Limpiyadhura. He argued that the Kuthi-Yankti stream, which carried a greater volume of water, should be recognized as the principal headwater of the Kali River, thereby placing the territory east of it within Nepal.

However, the British Governor-General, Lord Hastings, formally rejected this request. Relying on assessments by British surveyor W. J. Webb, the British administration maintained that the lesser stream originating from the Kalapani springs had traditionally been recognized as the main branch of the Kali River. Consequently, the British refused the border change and retained control of both the Kuthi Valley and the Limpiyadhura pass.

== Children ==
He had four sons Sri Chautaria Daksha Shah, Mohan Bir Shah, Nir Bhanjan Shah and Bhakta Keshar Shah. Actress Sharmila Malla is the descendant of Chautaria Bam Shah.
