= Bhakti Thapa =

Nepali military commander

Sardar Bhakti Thapa (Puwar)
- सरदार भक्ति थापा क्षेत्री
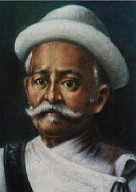
- Portrait of Sardar Bhakti Thapa Chhetri in his 70s

Grand Old Man of Deothal

Personal details
- Born: 1741 Lamjung District, Nepal
- Died: 1815 (aged 74) Deuthal, Garhwal Division, Kingdom of Nepal (present day Uttarakhand, India)
- Children: Ram Das Thapa Chhetri

Military service
- Battles/wars: Anglo-Nepalese war

Bhakti Thapa Chhetri (Nepali: भक्ति थापा क्षेत्री; 1741–1815) was a Nepali military commander and administrator who took part in the westward expansion of the Kingdom of Nepal and later fought in the Anglo-Nepalese War. Born in Lamjung, he joined the Nepalese unification campaign in 1789 and led an attack that resulted in the defeat of the Kingdom of Jumla. By 1794, he had become the supreme commander and administrator of Nepal's western territories, extending from Chepe-Marshyangdi to near the Sutlej River.

As an administrator in the west, Thapa was among the officials instructed by the royal court to enforce a prohibition on the trafficking and sale of children in Garhwal. During the Anglo-Nepalese War, he served on the western front, where Nepalese forces under Amar Singh Thapa were defending the area around Malaun against the East India Company. In April 1815, Thapa led a counterattack against Company forces entrenched at Deuthal and was killed in the fighting. Contemporary British accounts subsequently praised his conduct in the battle. The government of Nepal declared him a national hero in 2021.

== Childhood legend ==
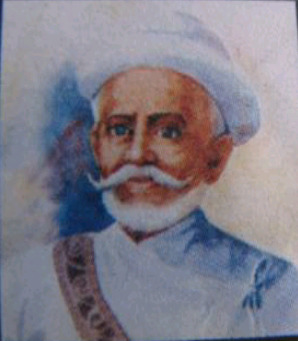
Sardar Bhakti Thapa, a Puwar Thapa Chhetri

According to recent historians, Bhakti Thapa was born in 1741. Bhakti Thapa's family lived in Dhangai, a remote village in Lamjung. Very little is known about the childhood life of Bhakti Thapa. There was, however, an unbelievable incident in the early life of Bhakti Thapa. That incident is virtually like a description from the children's storybook. The full details of that incident had been passed down through the generations. Still, many old people in Lamjung are seen telling that incident to their youngsters. That incident is described below.

Bhakti Thapa was still a very young boy. One day he was sleeping on a big boulder not far away from his house in a remote village of Lamjung while his flocks of goats grazed the buckwheat field of the neighbour. The old neighbour woman stormed out of her house into the place where Bhakti Thapa was fast asleep in a rage cursing him for his misdeeds. What she saw at that time chilled her blood. Bhakti Thapa was sleeping on a big serpent coiled up on the boulder raising its wide hood high above the casting shed that protected the young Bhakti Thapa against the scorching heat of the midday sun. The serpent slowly uncoiled without waking up the boy and descended from the boulder. It disappeared from sight after slipping into the bushes nearby.

The parents of Bhakti Thapa were terribly distressed when they learnt about the whole incident. They thanked God for saving the life of their beloved son. The old neighbour woman who saw the whole incident had a completely different opinion. The neighbor, witnessing the event, believed that Bhakti Thapa might have a significant destiny, a sentiment that contributed to local folklore about his early life. He possessed some sort of divine power. She was quick to realize that one day Bhakti Thapa would become a very famous person. The news of this incident quickly spread across the Lamjung and beyond.

The big boulder near the native home of Bhakti Thapa in Lamjung is linked up twice with the events in his later life. After some years a grand ritual was performed to solemnize the brotherhood relationship (in Nepali metairi) between Bhakti Thapa and that big boulder. The third event that linked Bhakti Thapa with that big boulder near his native home was the last in his life. It is said that at that very moment during the Anglo-Nepal War when Bhakti Thapa fell in the Deothal Battlefield on April 16, 1815, the big boulder near his native home also cracked with a loud explosion. The cracked boulder is still lying there. The government of Nepal (GoN) declared him a national hero on 28 July 2021.

== Unification campaign of Nepal ==
Bhakti Thapa joined the unification campaign in 1789 at a time when the further advance of the Nepalese force to the west was completely blocked for more than two years by the then-powerful kingdom of Jumla. It is said that Jumla had collected an army of twenty-two thousand men to face the Gorkhalis, a force far superior to anything the Gorkhalis could put in the field at that time. In the first major military operation itself, Bhakti Thapa had demonstrated his skill in launching a very successful operation under very adverse conditions. He used a different strategy from his predecessors, and led an attack on Jumla from the difficult north route. The result was a swift victory, and the lives of many people were saved.

Within a very short period of just two years, from 1789 to 1791, the western boundary of the Great Nepal had extended nearly as far as the Sutlez River (now India). Bhakti Thapa played a crucial role in such rapid expansion of Great Nepal. At that very time, Nepal was attacked by China from the north. During that period China was ruled by the powerful Emperor Chiang Lung of the Manchu Dynasty.

Among the Manchu emperors, Kang Hu Shi and Chiang Lung are considered to be the most influential. Emperor Kang Hu Shi ruled China from 1661 to 1722. He was contemporary with the Louis XIV of France, Peter the Great of Russia and Aurangazeb of India. Similarly, Emperor Chiang Lung ruled from 1736 to 1796. During his reign, countries like Burna or Korea were under the influence of China.

== Administration in the Western Front ==
The royal court sent the following orders to Bhakti Thapa regarding the abolition of slave trading in Garhwal:

Let not there be injustice in any matter. We had sent orders previously also banning the sale of the children of the subjects, but it seems that the practice has not been abandoned. You are, therefore, ordered to maintain checkposts and do whatever is necessary to put an end to the practice. Any person who is caught while trafficking in human beings shall be punished according to the previous order.

— Royal orders to Sardar Bhakti Thapa, Sardar Chandrabir Kunwar and Subba Shrestha Thapa on Baisakh Sudi 3, 1866 V.S.

== Nepal in great danger ==
The Chinese invasion was directed straight towards Kathmandu. The main attack was centered on Kyrung, which is almost to the north of the Kathmandu Valley. The Chinese attack was anticipated well in advance. As a result, Nepal had withdrawn most of its troops and commanders from the west to defend the capital Kathmandu against the Chinese invasion. It was the most critical period in the history of the newly born Great Nepal.

The existence of Nepal was in great danger. The country was under the threat of falling apart. In many areas, the rulers of the old regimes, who were disgruntled at the creation of the Great Nepal, had begun to stir up unrest. According to Sainikitihas of Nepal, Bhakti Thapa stationed in Kumaun virtually single-handedly succeeded in quelling the unrest fomented by the rulers of the old regime in the vast western regions which were very recently merged into the Great Nepal, despite the fact that he was made supreme commander and administrator of the territory stretching from Chepe-Marshyangdi to almost Sutlez River only in 1794. The Sainikitihas describe that Bhakti Thapa was constantly on the move from one end of this vast region to the other end, to prevent the Great Nepal from falling apart.

The Nepal-China war concluded with a treaty that reflected mutual interest in ending hostilities, though the resolution left some territorial and political questions unresolved. The fighting ended. According to L. Stiller, there was no real winner. Immediately after the signing of the peace treaty with China, Bhakti Thapa headquartered in Kumaun (now India) became the governor and chief commander of the whole region from the Chepe-Marshyangdi to almost the Sutlez River (in Pakistan).

== Britain's suspicion ==
The process of expansion of the Great Nepal was rapid. It was natural for the East India Company to be greatly alarmed. So the East India Company administration might not have in reality any intention of helping Nepal. We can draw such a conclusion from the circumstances surrounding the visit of Captain Kirkpatrick to Kathmandu in 1793. The Governor-general of India had agreed to send Kirkpatrick to mediate in the Nepal-China dispute. Kirkpatrick did not even set out for Nepal until after the war had been successfully terminated by the Nepal-China agreement. The governor general was requested not to send Kirkpatrick since the war had been amicably concluded. Surprisingly the governor general was adamant on sending a man to Kathmandu. So Kirkpatrick visited Kathmandu for no specific official purpose. The intention of Kirkpatrick's visit could hardly be anything else but to watch closely Nepal's speedy preparation for the next phase of the unification campaign that had officially led to the emergence of Bhakti Thapa as its head.

During the visit, Kirkpatrick found that Nepal was trying to reinvigorate the attack in the west. The circumstances, under which the visit of Kirkpatrick to Kathmandu took place, clearly show that the Company administration in India w all the time watching Nepal with great suspicion. At that time the East India Company administration were adopting every possible method to enlarge the territory under their control. The way new territories were brought under the control if the East India Company and ruled had provoked the interest of the British public. The British Parliament had gone completely against it.

== Anglo-Nepal War ==
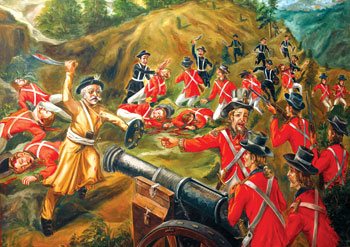
Bhakti Thapa leading Gorkha men at Anglo Nepal war

The process of expansion of the Great Nepal had spread rapidly across the Himalayan region. So it was natural for the East India Company to be greatly alarmed. The Great Nepal was seen all along as a threat to Company rule in India till the end of the Anglo-Nepal War of 1814–16.

The East India Company actively began preparation for the war from the time when F.R. Warren Hastings - Earl of Moira landed in India as Governor General and Commander-in-Chief in 1813. The actual declaration of war against Nepal is recorded as 1 November 1814, though the war began from in middle of October. The decision to declare war had been made six months earlier so the territorial dispute appears to be only a pretext. Company forces had marched into Nepal across a frontier of more than 1,500 km (930 mi) to attack at several points at the same time. The eastern East India Company flank was moving north from the Teesta area, whereas the farthermost western flank came from the Sutlej River area. It was virtually modern-type warfare extended over a period of three calendar years and necessitating to protect the entire region bordering the enemy-held territory. The British invasion forces, in comparison with the Nepalese, had absolute superiority in cavalry, pioneers, and at least the superiority of 10 times in infantry and 100 times in artillery. They also had the advantage of maneuverability in movement.

In the early months of the war, the initial British invasion force was completely frustrated by Nepalese tactics. The British offensive ended in complete failure. Nepalese forces stationed within the shelter of the fortress were not only able to defend their position against an invading enemy many times superior in strength, but they even shocked them by their dreadful counteroffensive that used to be accompanied by big losses on the British side.

After the initial defeats, the British changed their strategy to avoid their casualties. They started to deploy long-range guns to level Nepal's fortifications. This strategy paid off. The British were able to advance quickly into the territory under Nepal's control. They even used elephants to carry heavy guns across the mountains. So the ability of the Nepalese force to defend the territory under their control was steadily declining. They were forced to pull back. There was a breakdown in the command and control system.

Towards the middle of 1815, Amar Singh Thapa, chief of the Nepalese forces fighting on the western front, was confined within a small area of the Malaun fort. The fate of Nepal was going to be in the hands of the Governor General Lord Hastings, who was determined to solidify Company rule in India. At that time he worked either to eliminate Nepal completely and bring it under Company rule or to transform it into a vassal state like so many other states under that category in Colonial India. He could be forced not to take any such decision detrimental to the honour of Nepal only if he perceived that such action could pose a serious threat to the continuance of Company rule in India. The Deothal Battle could not be anything else but a clear message of threat on behalf of Nepalese people to the East India Company warning them not to take lightly the determination of Nepalese people to protect the honour of their country.

== Battle of Deuthal ==
Towards sunset on April 16, 1815, Bhakti Thapa and the army units under him arrived at the Malaun fort from their station at Surajgarh, without being noticed by the East India Company units scattered around the Malaun fortress.

The following day in the morning, Bhakti Thapa, at the age of 73, led a daring counterattack against the East India Company force entrenched at Deuthal. Historians have presented the description of this battle at great length. It was 3.15 a.m. when a force of just about 400 under Bhakti Thapa marched out of the Malaun fort, to a slow but steady beat of a drum. The British column under Thompson had taken position at Deothal on reverse slopes. The cannons of 6-pounders were properly concealed. There were two Indian battalions, the Grenadiers companies of the Light Battalions and some 1,000 irregulars. The British strength was up to about 3,500 troops and weapons.

Prior to leading the charge at Deothal, Bhakti Thapa entrusted his grandson to Amar Singh Thapa, showcasing his preparedness for the sacrifices of war. Bhakti Thapa had even handed his infant grandson to the custody of the Amar Singh Thapa just before going to the battlefield. Bhakti Thapa laid down his life on the battlefield. Every one who fought from the Nepalese side was either killed or wounded.

== Reputation ==
Contemporary British accounts acknowledged Bhakti Thapa's bravery at Deothal, though the battle ultimately resulted in heavy losses for the Nepalese forces. One of the historians, CB Khanduri writes quoting various contemporary British historians:

"The euphemism of the BRAVEST OF THE BRAVES had been used by Napoleon for Marshal Ney, whose bravery during the retreat from Moscow in 1812 was one of the highest. BRAVE LES BRAVE, said Napoleon of him. The British then used this citation for the Gurkhas during and after the Anglo-Nepal War. Such was the bravery shown by Bhakti Thapa that the next legend of the Bravest of the Braves had been created on the day - 16 April 1815 at Deothal."
