= Morris D. Brown =

American carom billiards player

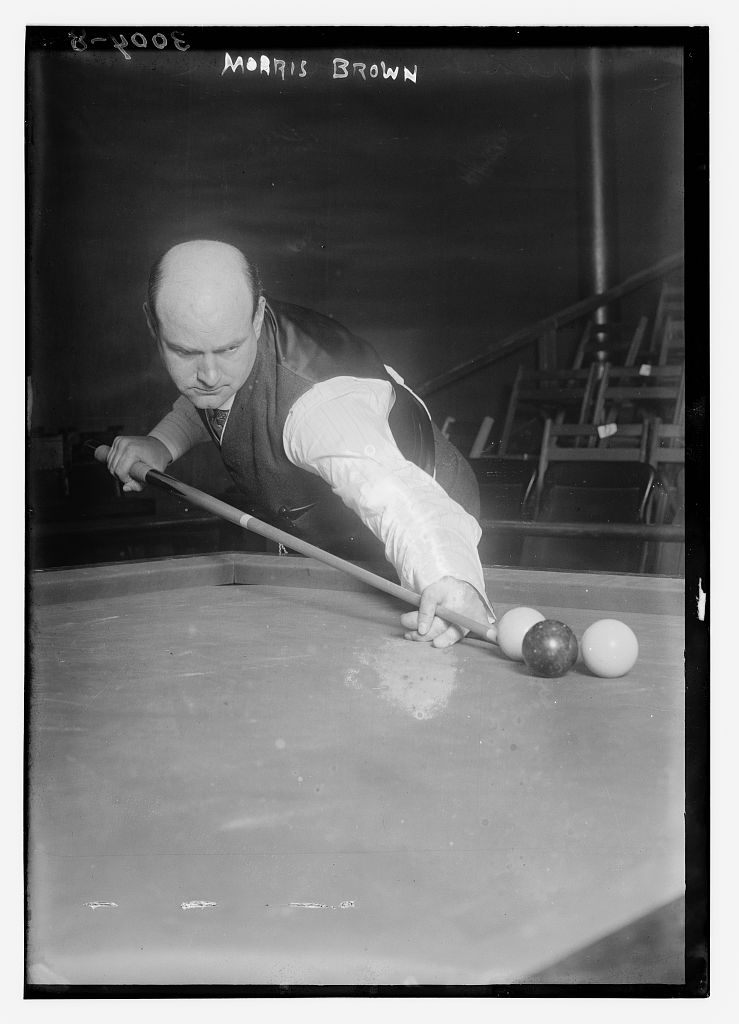

Morris Decker Brown (July 20, 1876 – June 9, 1944) was an American carom billiards champion.

== Biography ==
Brown was born in 1876 in Paterson, New Jersey.

On March 19, 1914, he defeated the previous champion, Joseph Mayer at the Amateur Billiard Club by 400 to 379. This allowed him to move to the next round of games. He then lost the championship match on March 21, 1914, to Edward W. Gardner in the balkline championship by 400 to 386. On April 9, 1914, he again defeated Joseph Mayer in the Arion Society's Interstate Challenge by 300 to 232.

He died of stomach cancer in Harrisonburg, Virginia, aged 66.
