= Edward W. Gardner =

American pool player

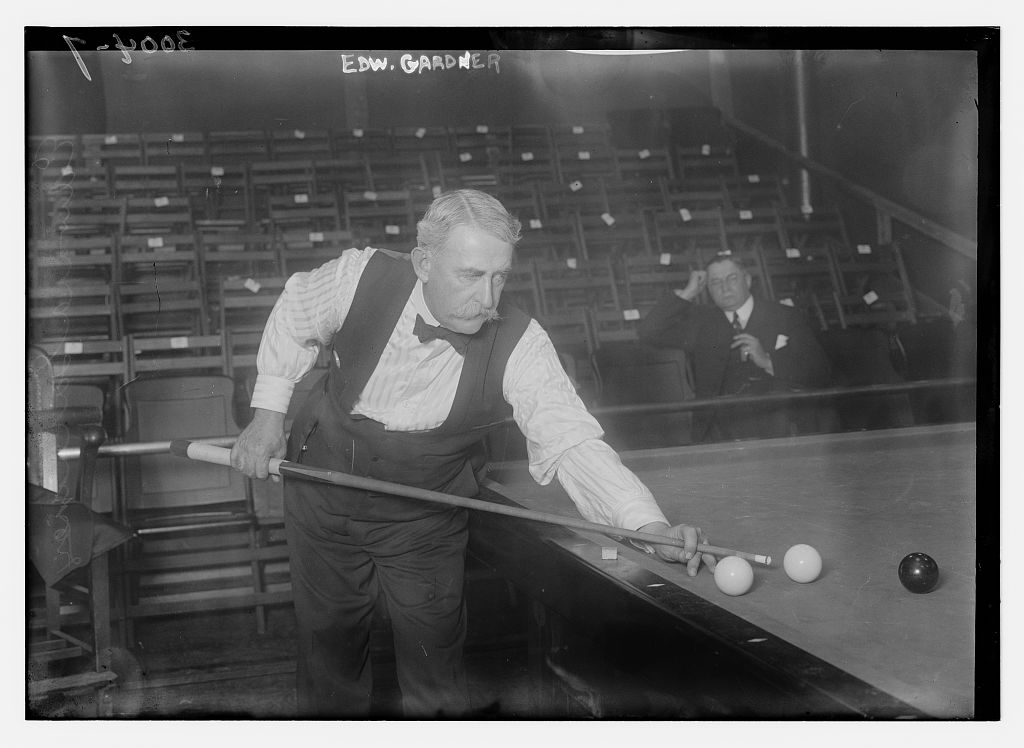

Edward W. Gardner (1867 – January 26, 1932) of Passaic, New Jersey, was an American carom billiards champion in 1902, 1906, 1910, 1914 and 1916.

== Biography ==
In 1914 he defeated Morris D. Brown and won the balkline championship by 400 to 386. He died on January 26, 1932, at Saint Vincent's Catholic Medical Center.
