= Edward Gardner House =

Historic house in Massachusetts, United States

- U.S. National Register of Historic Places
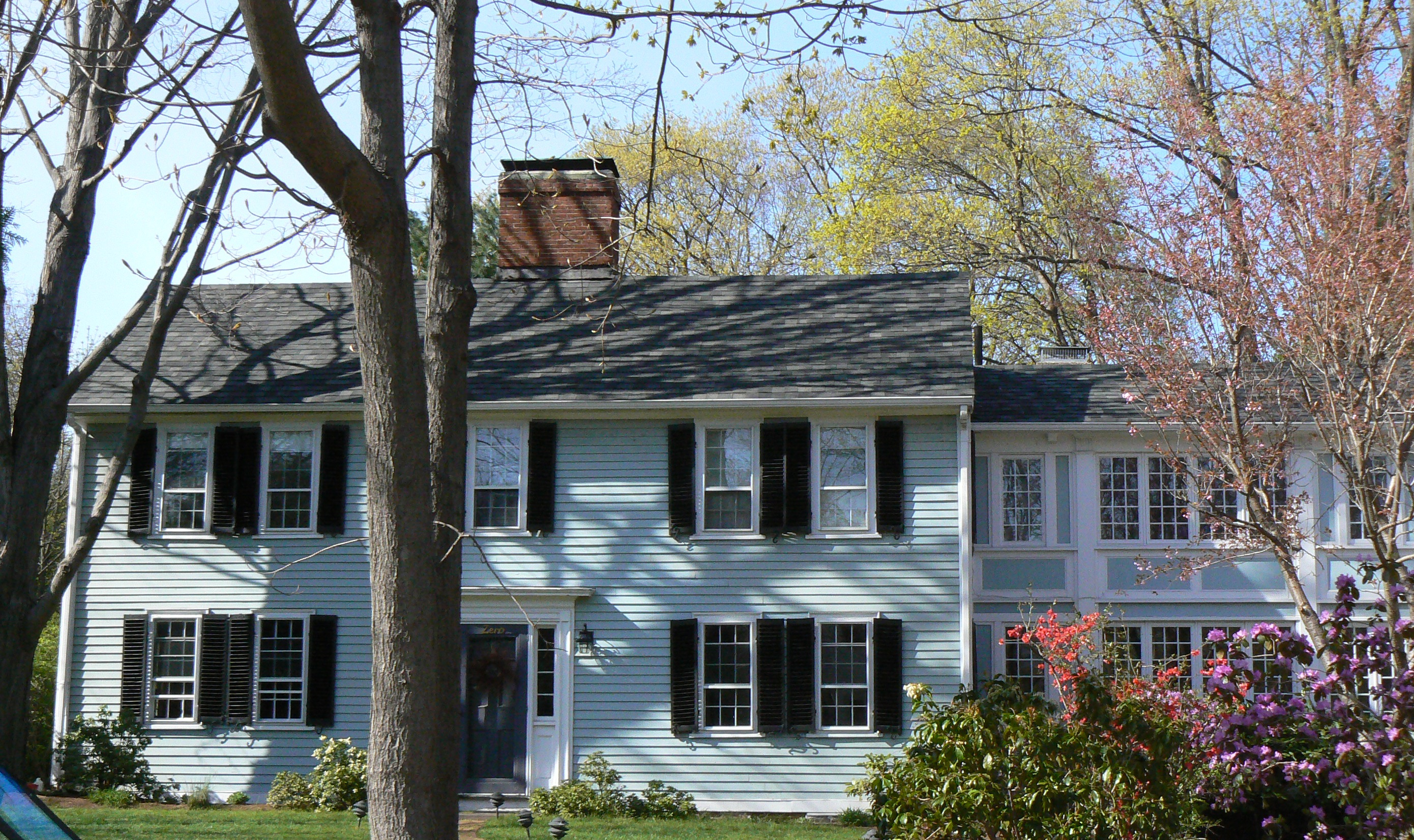

- Location within Massachusetts Location within the United States
- Location: Winchester, Massachusetts
- Coordinates: 42°26′39″N 71°9′8″W
- Area: less than one acre
- Built: c. 1764
- Architect: Smith, F. Patterson
- Architectural style: Colonial Revival, Georgian
- MPS: Winchester MRA
- NRHP reference No.: 89000605
- Added to NRHP: July 5, 1989

The Edward Gardner House is a historic house at Zero Gardner Place in Winchester, Massachusetts. Built about 1764, it is one of the oldest buildings in Winchester, and is also important for its association with the Gardner family, who were early settlers of the area. It was listed on the National Register of Historic Places in 1989.

== Description and history ==
The Edward Gardner House is located in central southern Winchester, at the northeast corner of Cambridge Street (United States Route 3) and Gardner Place. It is a 2 1/2-story wood-frame structure, with a side-gable roof and clapboarded exterior. The main block is five bays wide and only one room deep, with a large central chimney. A leanto section extends to the rear, giving the house a saltbox profile. The front entry is framed by half-length sidelight windows and pilasters supporting an entablature. The interior has retained much of its original woodwork and finish.

The land this house stands on was originally granted to Increase Nowell, who never lived on his 300-acre (120 ha) grant. By 1651 Richard Gardner was living on this land, which he purchased in 1659. Edward Gardner, one of his fifth-generation descendants built this house about 1764, the year he inherited the land. His descendants included Henry Gardner, the Massachusetts treasurer during the American Revolutionary War, and Henry Gardner, the Known Nothing Governor of Massachusetts in the 1850s. This house was sold out of the family after Edward's death in 1825.

The house was purchased in 1931 by F. Patterson Smith, a Harvard-educated architect who later became dean of the Harvard Graduate School of Design, who undertook its restoration. His work included the removal of a 19th-century shoe-shop wing (now 2 Gardner Place), and converted the barn (which also stands on a now-separate lot) to a Shingle-style residence. This house is one of two in the town that predate the Revolution.

== See also ==
- National Register of Historic Places listings in Winchester, Massachusetts
