= Tehri Garhwal House =

Residence of the Maharaja of Tehri Garhwal

Coordinates: 28.621447°N 77.235244°E

Tehri Garhwal House is the former residence of the Maharaja of Tehri Garhwal in Delhi, India. It is located at 5, Bhagwan Das Road.

It is still in the possession of the princely family. It is currently the residence of the Lok Sabha member from Tehri Garhwal constituency, Mala Rajya Laxmi Shah, who herself is a member of the princely family.
