= Garhwal District =

Coordinates: 30°15′N 79°20′E

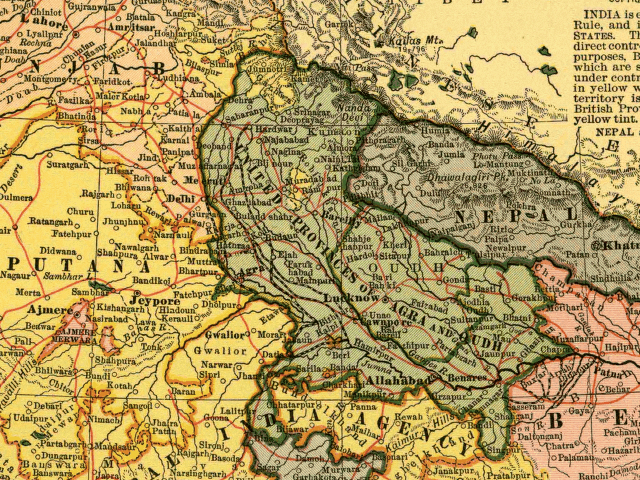
United Provinces, 1903

Garhwal District is a former district in Kumaon of British India of the United Provinces, and had an area of 5,629 sq mi (14,580 km^{2}). It later became a part of the Indian state of Uttar Pradesh, today it is part of the Indian state Uttarakhand.

== History ==
The first dynasty that ruled over Uttarakhand was Katyuri. It marked various milestones in the area of inscriptions and temples. After the downfall of Katyuris the whole of Garhwal region was broken up into more than sixty four principalities which were ruled by a chieftain. Originally Garhwal had 52 garh (fortresses). These garh were small and had their own chiefs who were responsible for the welfare of the fort. The Garhwal Kingdom was found by one of the chief named Ajay Pal, who reduced the petty forts and brought them under his own chieftainship. He and his ancestors ruled over Garhwal and Tehri till 1803. During their rule they encountered various attacks from "Mughals", "Sikhs", "Rohillas" and "Gorkhas". The Garhwalis started associating the term "Gorkhyani" with massacre. Despite the efforts of the Garhwalis the Gorkhas managed to capture till Langoorgarh but had to retreat due to an attack by the Chinese army. In 1803 the Gorkha Kingdom invaded Kumaon and Garhwal yet again and drove the Garhwal chief away. For the next 12 years the Gorkhas ruled over Garhwal. In 1814 they got into a war with the British for encroaching on their territory. Garhwal and Kumaon then became a British district. Garhwal had an area of 5629 sq. mil and was under the Kumaon division. After independence garhwal, Almora and Nainital were administered by the commissioner of Kumaon division. In 1960 Chamoli was removed out of the Garhwal region. In 1969 Garhwal division was established and Pauri was made its headquarters.

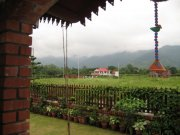
Garhwal

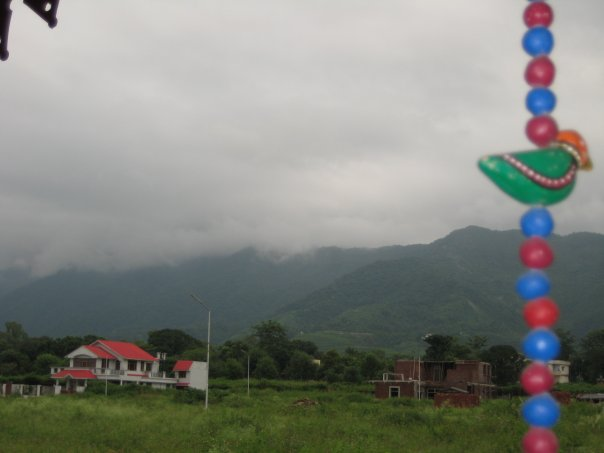
Mussorie hills

== People ==
The people of Garhwal are known as Garhwalis. Very often they are called Pahari, meaning People from the mountains. Almost 99% of the Garhwalis are Hindus. Today they have migrated from the mountains to all over the world.
