= Tara (Buddhism) =

Female Buddha of Compassion

Tārā
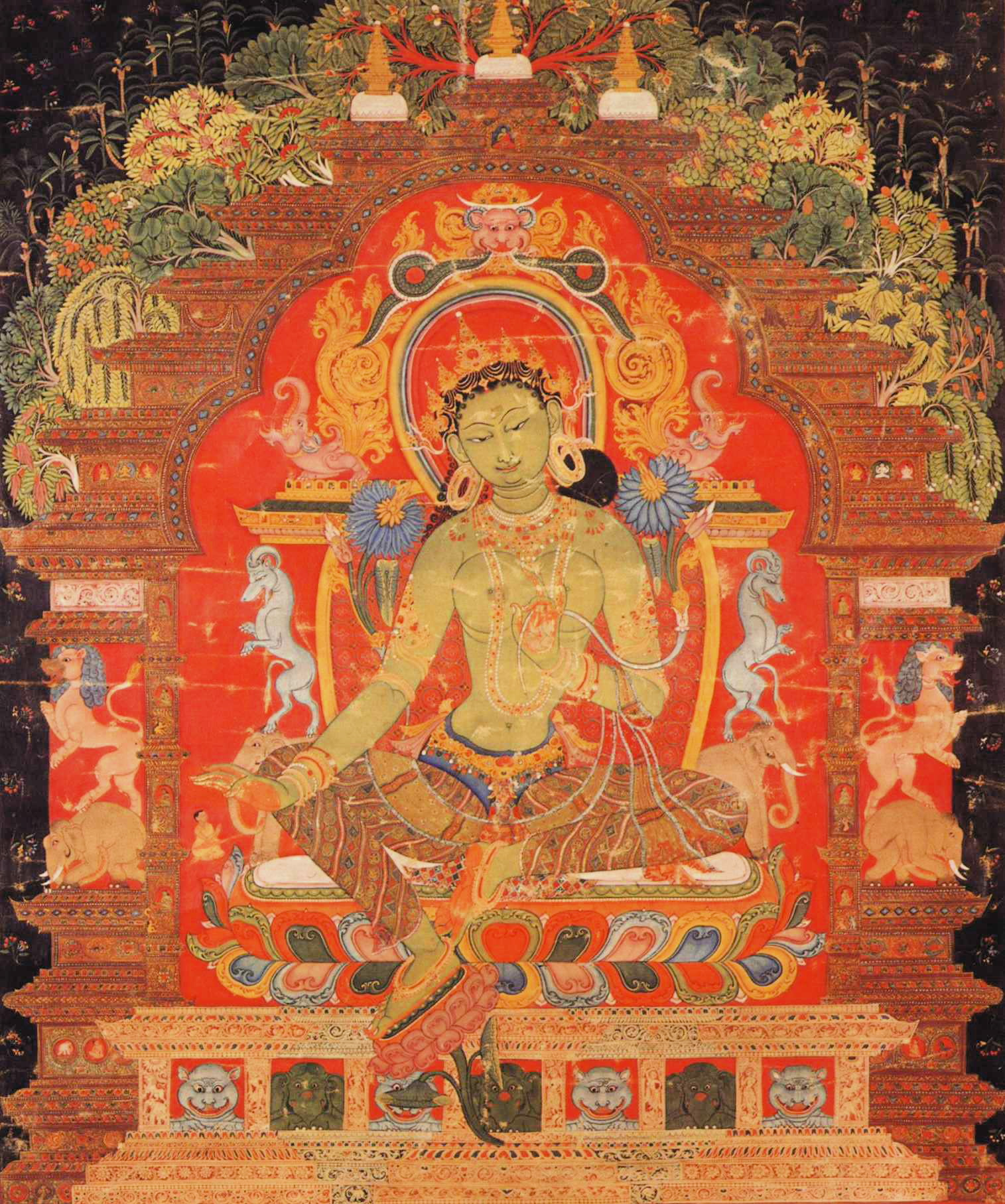
- 13th century Tibetan painting of Green Tara
- Sanskrit: तारा Tārā
- Chinese: (Traditional) 多羅菩薩 (Simplified) 多罗菩萨 (Pinyin: Duōluó Púsà) 度母 (Pinyin: Dùmǔ)
- Japanese: 多羅菩薩(たらぼさつ) (romaji: Tara Bosatsu)
- Korean: 다라보살 (RR: Dara Bosal)
- Mongolian: ᠳ᠋ᠠᠷ᠋᠋᠋᠋᠋᠋ ᠠ᠂ ᠳ᠋ᠠᠷ ᠠ ᠡᠬᠡ; Дарь, Дарь эх Dara, Dara eke
- Tagalog: Tala
- Thai: พระนางตารา
- Tibetan: རྗེ་བརྩུན་སྒྲོལ་མ།།
- Vietnamese: Đa La Bồ Tát; Độ Mẫu

Information
- Venerated by: Mahāyāna, Vajrayāna

Tara (Sanskrit: तारा, tārā; Standard Tibetan: སྒྲོལ་མ, dölma), Ārya Tārā (Noble Tara), also known as Jetsün Dölma (Tibetan: rje btsun sgrol ma, meaning: "Venerable Mother of Liberation"), is an important female Buddha in Buddhism, especially revered in Vajrayana Buddhism and Mahayana Buddhism. She may appear as a female bodhisattva in Mahayana Buddhism. In Vajrayana Buddhism, Green Tara is a female Buddha who is a consort of Amoghasiddhi Buddha. Tārā is also known as a saviouress who hears the cries of beings in saṃsāra and saves them from worldly and spiritual danger.

In Vajrayana, she is considered to be a Buddha, and the Tārā Tantra describes her as "a mother who gives birth to the buddhas of the three times" who is also "beyond saṃsāra and nirvāṇa". She is one of the most important female deities in Vajrayana and is found in sources like the Mañjuśrīmūlakalpa, and the Guhyasamāja Tantra. Key Indic Vajrayana texts which focus on Tārā include the Tantra Which Is the Source for All the Functions of Tārā, Mother of All the Tathagatas (Skt. Sarvatathāgatamātṛtārāviśvakarmabhavanāmatantra) and Tārā's Fundamental Ritual Text (Tārāmūlakalpa).

Both Green and White Tārā remain popular meditation deities or yidams in Tibetan Buddhism, and Tara is also revered in Newar Buddhism. Tārā is considered to have many forms or emanations, while Green Tara emanates twenty-one Tārās, each with different attributes—colors, implements, and activities such as pacifying (śānti), increasing (pauṣṭika), enthralling (vaśīkaraṇa), and wrathful (abhicāra). The Green Tara (or "blue-green", Skt. Samayatara or śyāmatārā) remains the most important form of the deity in Tibetan Buddhism. A practice text entitled Praises to the Twenty-One Taras is a well known text on Tara in Tibetan Buddhism and in Tibet, recited by children and adults, and is the textual source for the twenty-one forms of Green Tārā.

The main Tārā mantra is the same for Buddhists and Hindus alike: oṃ tāre tuttāre ture svāhā. It is pronounced by Tibetans and Buddhists who follow the Tibetan culture as oṃ tāre tu tāre ture soha. The literal translation would be "Oṃ O Tārā, I pray O Tārā, O Swift One, So Be It!"

== Etymology ==
Tārā (Devanagari: तारा) is a feminine noun derived from the root √tṝ, "to cross". It is causative, and as such means "to cause to cross", i.e., "to rescue".

This is why the name is sometimes translated as "savioress" or "rescuer". For example, in Tibetan, she is known as Jetsun Drölma ( རྗེ་བརྩུན་སྒྲོལ་མ།།, སྒྲོལ་མ, Wylie: rje btsun sgrol ba), meaning "Venerable Saviour" which is derived from the Tibetan verb sgrol ba meaning "to save, rescue, liberate; to carry, transport, or cross; and to expel or drive away [evil]".

The name Tārā may also mean "star" or "planet" (since they are celestial bodies which cross the sky and are thus literally "crossers").

Tara is also known in East Asian Buddhism. In Chinese, her name is rendered as Duoluo Pusa (多羅菩薩, Duōluó Púsà), with Pusa indicating bodhisattva status. In Japanese she is Tara Bosatsu (多羅菩薩 たらぼさつ). The name means "Bodhisattva who catches many" or "Bodhisattva who collects numerous [sentient beings]", derived from the characters: 羅, "to catch, gather, collect, sift", and 多 "many; much; a lot of; numerous".

== History ==
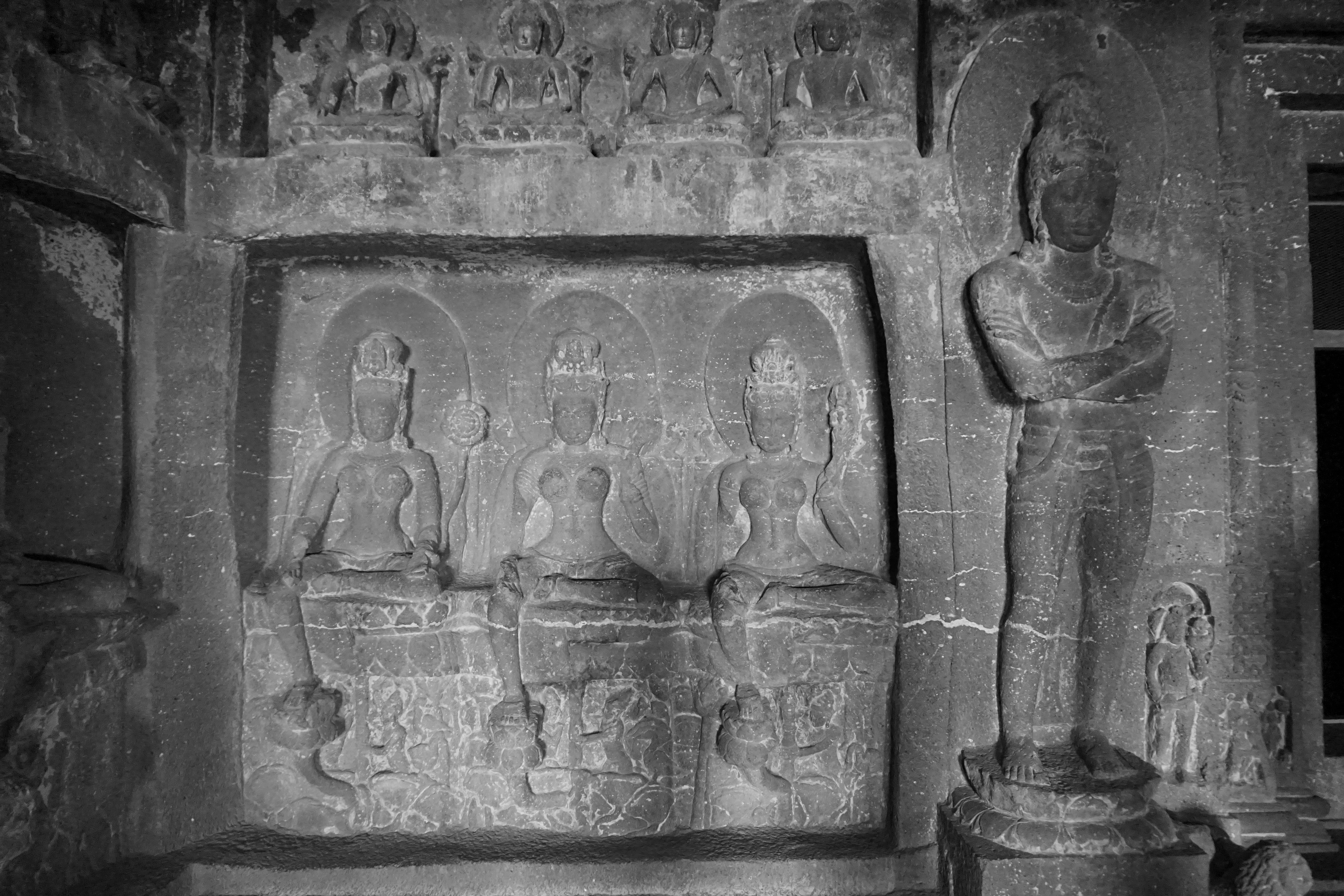
Three Taras at Ellora Caves, Cave number 12

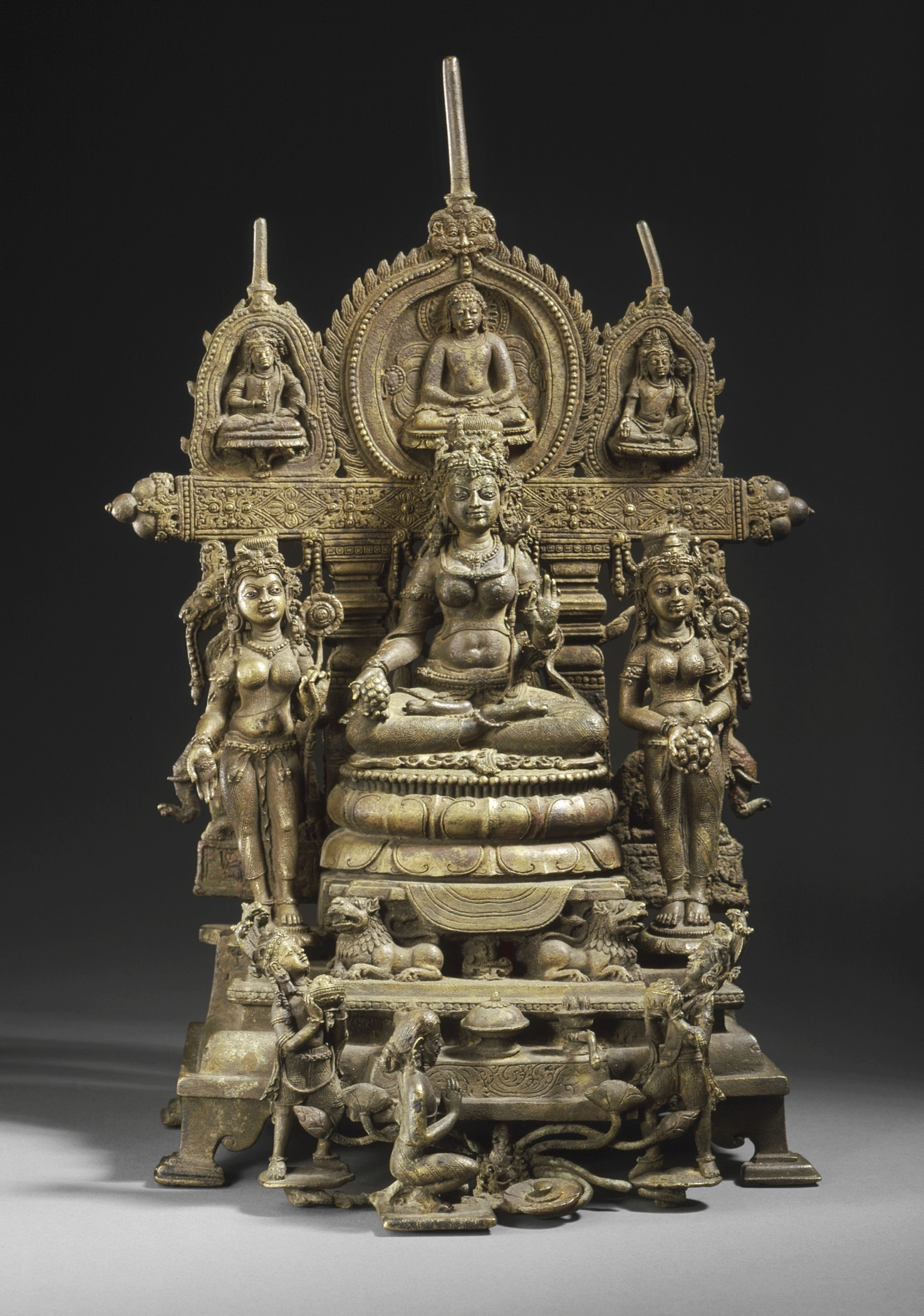
Green Tara attended by White Tara and Cintamani Tārā (Yellow Tara). Madhya Pradesh, Sirpur, c. 8th century

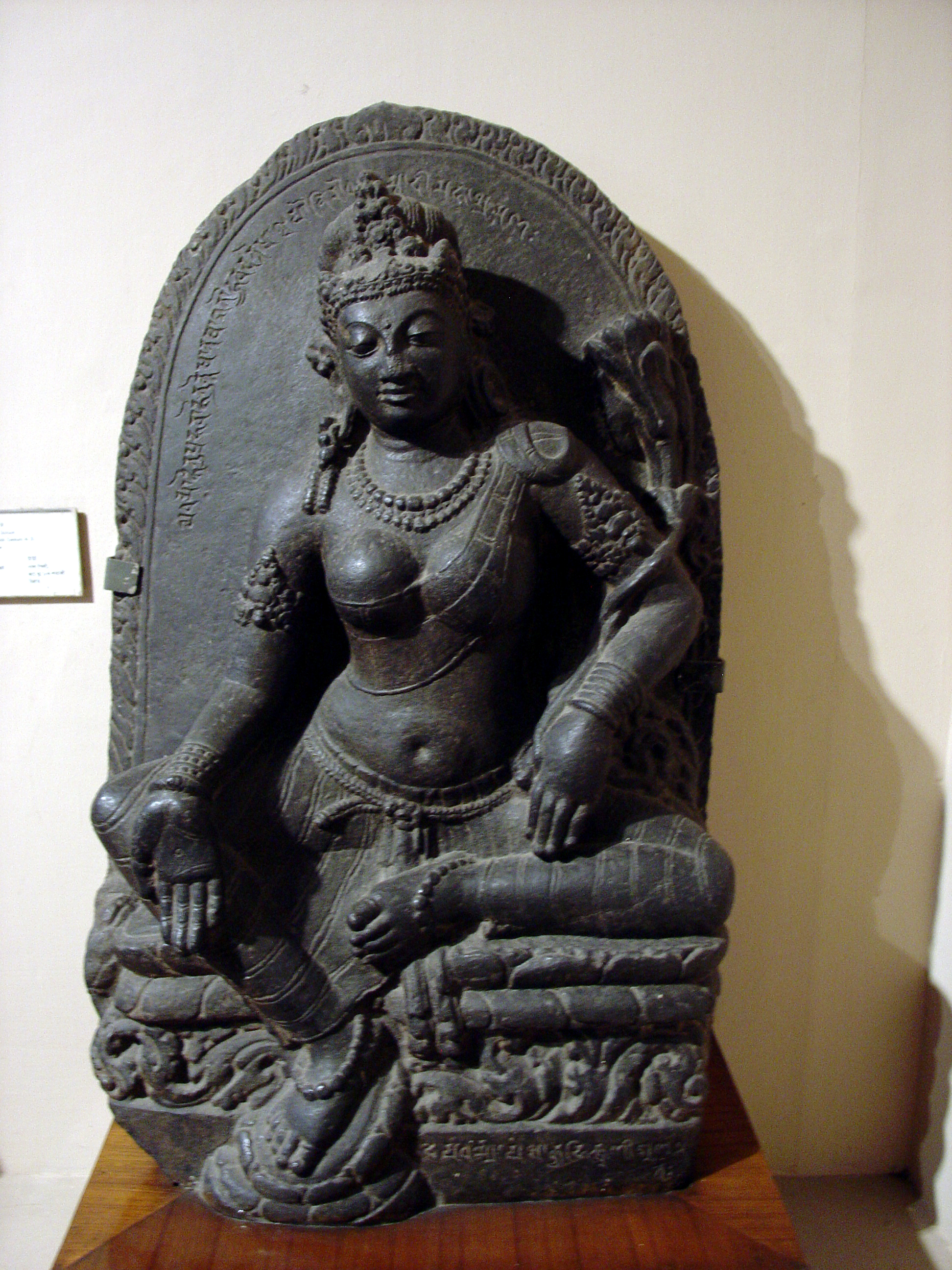
Tara image from Nepal, 10th century

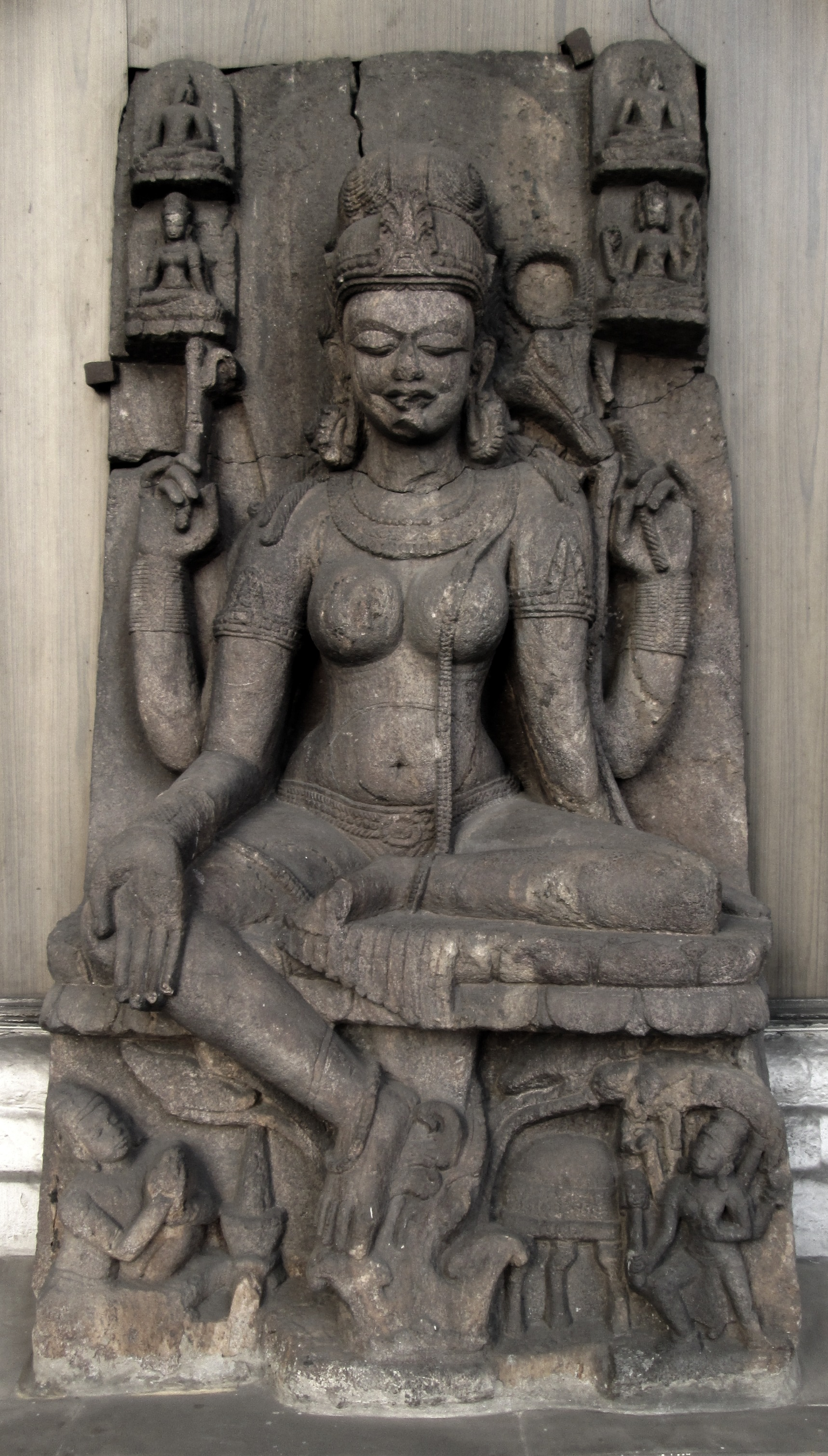
Tara statue from Lalitagiri, Odisha, c. 10th century

Buddhist studies scholars generally agree that the worship of Tārā began growing in popularity in India during the 6th century. Evidence from Nalanda shows that her cult was established by the sixth century. In the earliest sources, Tārā is seen as the personification of Avalokiteśvara's compassion. She often appears as part of a triad, with Avalokiteśvara and Bhr̥kuṭī, as can be seen in the Kānherī cave 90 (sixth-century ce). Another early identifiable image of Tārā is found at cave 6 within the rock-cut Buddhist monastic complex of the Ellora Caves in Maharashtra (c. 7th century CE). Her worship was well established by the onset of the Pala Empire in Eastern India (8th century CE).

One of the earliest textual references to the goddess is the Mañjuśrī-mūla-kalpa (c. 5th–8th centuries CE), which calls her the noble goddess who is the compassion of Avalokiteśvara (devīmāryāvalokiteśvarakaruṇāṃ). This text also goes on to call her "the mother of the illustrious Prince Mañjughoṣa", giving her the title of a mātā devī (mother goddess) and associates her with Prajñāpāramitā and Prajñāpāramitā Devī.

The origin of Tārā is unclear and remains a source of inquiry among scholars. Mallar Ghosh believes her to have originated as a form of the goddess Durga. Tārā is worshiped both in Buddhism as well as in Shaktism (Hinduism) as one of the ten Mahavidyas. According to Beyer, the enlightened feminine makes its first appearance in Mahayana Buddhism as Prajñāpāramitā Devi, the personified Perfection of Wisdom, who is also called mother of Buddhas.

Tara eventually came to be considered the "Mother of all Buddhas" by Indian tantric Buddhists, taking on this epithet from Prajñaparamita. The term mother of Buddhas usually refers to a transcendent awakened wisdom, though it also echoes the ancient Indian motif of the Mother Goddess (Devi Mata).

With the composition of the Tārā-mūla-kalpa, the main Buddhist tantra associated with the goddess and mahāvidyā, Tārā became a very popular Vajrayana deity in north India. Tārā worship also spread to other parts of India, as well as to Nepal, Sri Lanka and Indonesia, where depictions of the deity have been discovered by archeologists. With the movement of Indian Buddhism into Tibet, the worship and practices of Tārā became incorporated into Tibetan Buddhism as well.

As the worship of Tārā developed, various prayers, chants and mantras became associated with her. These came out of a felt devotional need, and from her inspiration causing spiritual masters to compose sadhanas, stotras, or tantric meditations.

Independent of whether she is classified as a deity, a Buddha, or a bodhisattva, Tārā remains very popular in Tibet (and Tibetan communities in exile in Northern India), Mongolia, Nepal, Bhutan, Sikkim and is worshiped in many Buddhist communities throughout the world (though in East Asian Buddhism, Guanyin is the most popular female deity). In Tibet, Green Tārā was also considered to have manifested as the Nepalese Princess (Bhrikuti), and White Tārā's manifestation as the Chinese princess Kongjo (Princess Wencheng).

== Origin myth ==
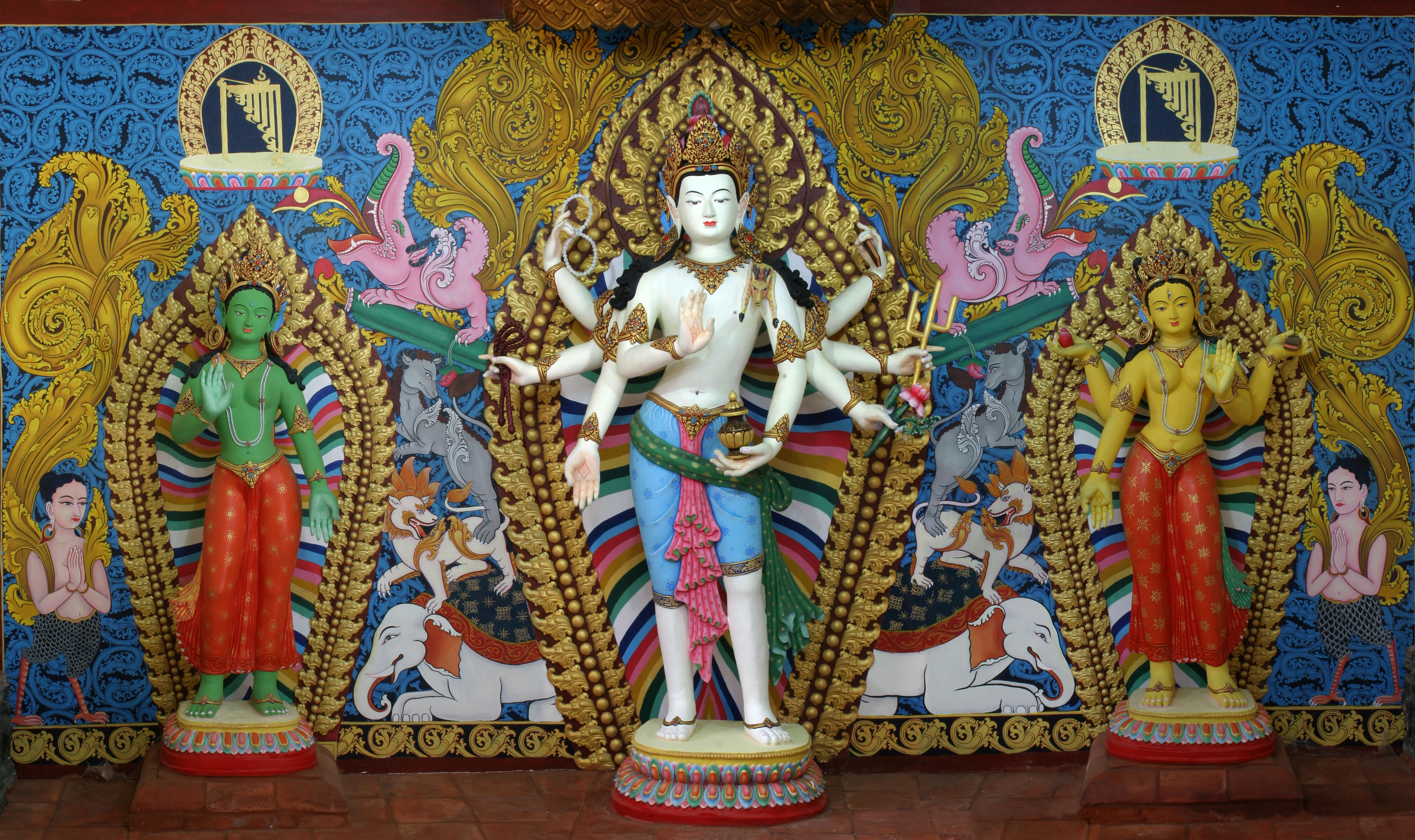
Lokesvara flanked by two Tārās

Tārā has many origin stories which explain her origin as a bodhisattva. According to one story, Tārā arose from Avalokiteshvara's compassionate tears when he wept on seeing all the suffering of all the beings in samsara. His tears turned into a lotus, out of which Tārā arose.

The Indian master Sūryagupta explains this myth as follows:

What was Her origin? - Arya-Lokesvara, the Lord and Refuge of the Three Realms, Desire, Form, and Formless, which depend on the five or [in the Formless Realm] four aggregates that perish in an instant, saw that however many migrating beings he removed from samsara, they grew no fewer, and He wept. Tara sprang from the opening filaments of his face - of an utpala (blue lotus) that grew in the water of His tears.

Another tale begins with a young princess who lives in a different world system, millions of years in the past. Her name is Jñanachandra or Yeshe Dawa, which means "Moon of Primordial Awareness". For quite a number of aeons she makes offerings to the Buddha of that world system, whose name was Tonyo Drupa. She receives special instruction from him concerning bodhicitta—the infinitely compassionate mental state of a bodhisattva. After doing this, some monks approach her and suggest that because of her level of attainment she should next pray to be reborn as a male to progress further.

At this point she lets the monks know in no uncertain terms that it is only "weak minded worldlings" who see gender as a barrier to attaining enlightenment. She sadly notes there have been few who wish to work for the welfare of sentient beings in a female form, though. Therefore, she resolves to always be reborn as a female bodhisattva, until samsara is no more. She then stays in a palace in a state of meditation for some ten million years, and the power of this practice releases tens of millions of beings from suffering. As a result of this, Tonyo Drupa tells her she will henceforth manifest supreme bodhi as the Goddess Tārā in many world systems to come.

A similar story is told by the 14th Dalai Lama:

There is a true feminist movement in Buddhism that relates to the goddess Tārā. Following her cultivation of bodhicitta, the bodhisattva's motivation, she looked upon the situation of those striving towards full awakening and she felt that there were too few people who attained Buddhahood as women. So she vowed, "I have developed bodhicitta as a woman. For all my lifetimes along the path I vow to be born as a woman, and in my final lifetime when I attain Buddhahood, then, too, I will be a woman.

Tārā, then, embodies certain ideals which make her attractive to women practitioners, and her emergence as a Bodhisattva can be seen as a part of Mahayana Buddhism's reaching out to women, and becoming more inclusive even in 6th-century CE India.

== Characteristics and symbolism ==
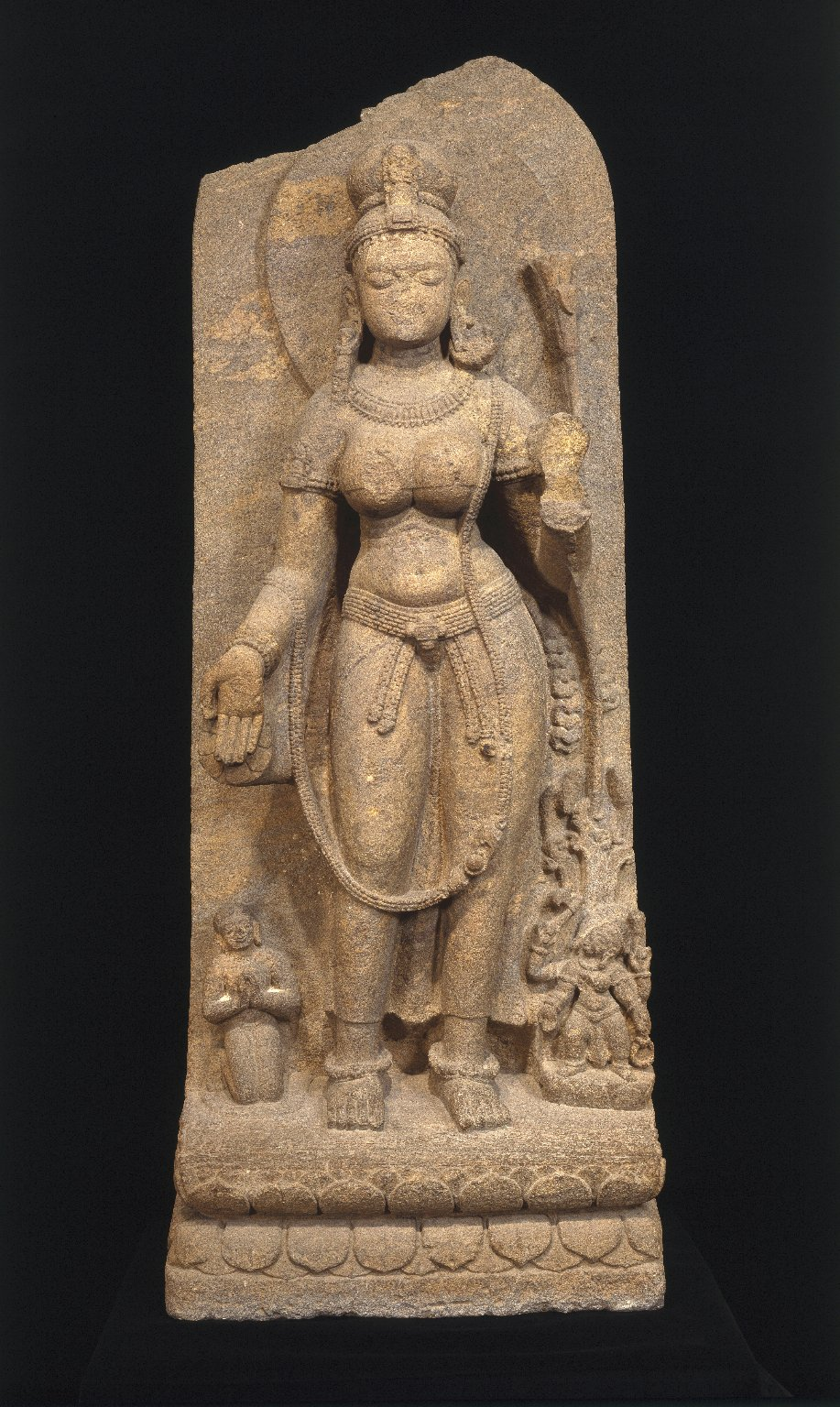
Syamatara (Green Tara), 8th century, protect her followers from danger. Brooklyn Museum

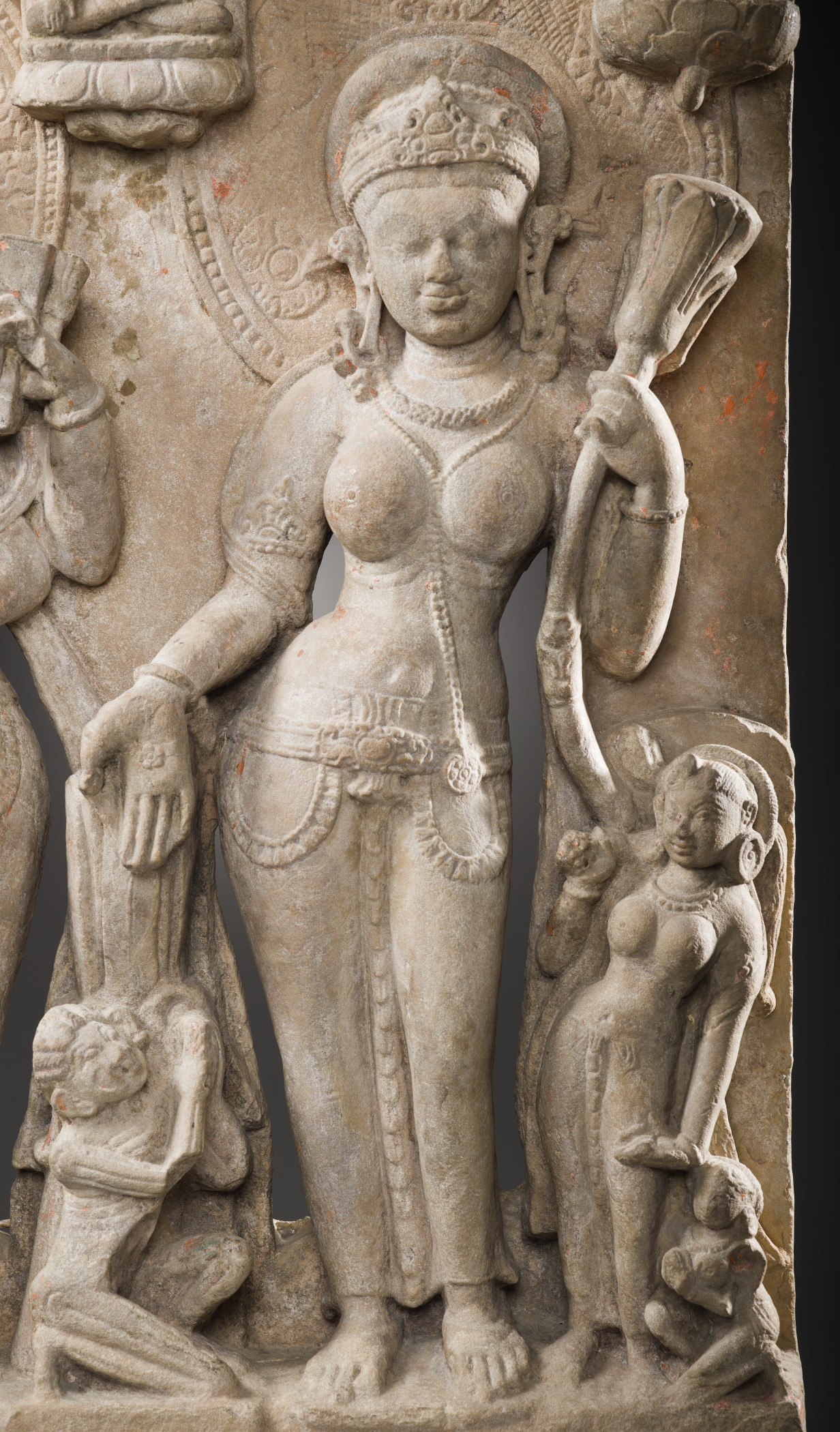
Tara from Pakhna, Uttar Pradesh, India, 9th century

Tārā's name literally means "star" or "planet", and therefore she is associated with navigation and travel both literally and metaphorically as spiritual crossing to the "other side" of the ocean of existence (enlightenment). Hence she is known literally as "she who saves" in Tibetan. In the 108 Names of the Holy Tara, Tara is "Leader of the caravans ..... who showeth the way to those who have lost it" and she is named as Dhruva, the Sanskrit name for the North Star. Due to her association with navigation and travel, she is thus popular as a savior and protector from danger. In modern Tibetan Buddhism, Tārā is one of the most popular deities that are appealed to by laypersons and monastics alike for aid.

Tara's main form is depicted as dark green in color, which is associated with awakened activity. In Himalayan Buddhist iconography, each color is typically associated with a specific kind of activity (for example white is pacification and red is power). Because dark green is seen as a combination of all other colors, the main form of Tārā, Green Tārā, is considered to be the source of all beneficial activities.

Within Tibetan Buddhism, Tārā appears in many forms, each tied to certain colors, symbols, and beneficial activities. As Green Tārā she offers succor and protection from all the unfortunate circumstances one can encounter in the world of suffering. As White Tārā she expresses maternal compassion and offers healing to beings who are hurt or wounded, either mentally or psychically. White Tara is further associated with longevity, countering illness, and purification. Red Tārā meanwhile is associated with power, controlling and influencing others as well as with the transformation of desire into compassion. The manifestation of Blue Tārā (Ekajati) is a ferocious female protector whose invocation destroys all obstacles.

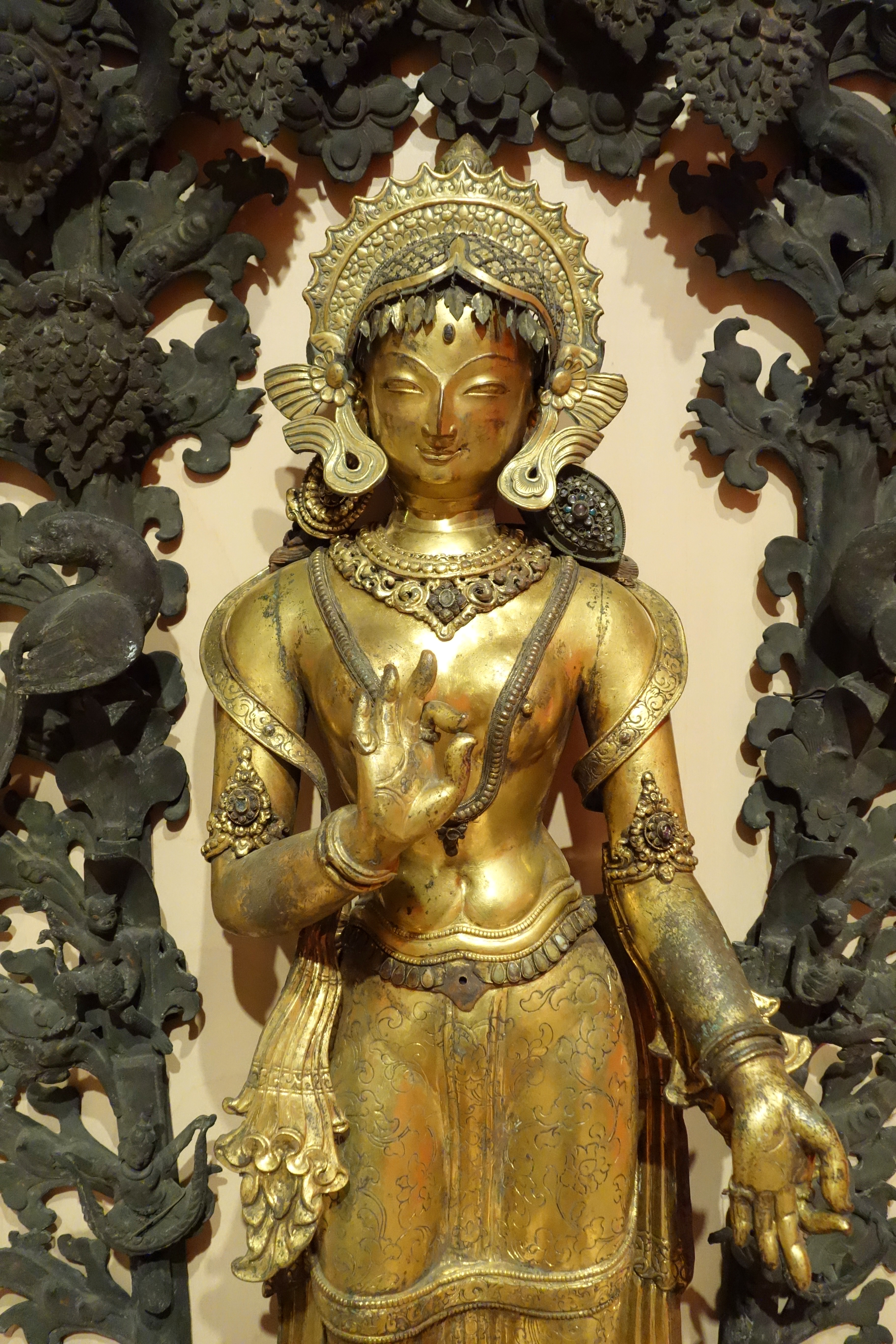
A copper Tārā from Nepal, c. 17th or 18th century

Tārā is also a forest goddess, particularly in her form as Khadiravani, "dweller in the Khadira forest" and is generally associated with plant life, flowers, acacia (khadira) trees and the wind. Because of her association with nature and plants, Tārā is also known as a healing goddess (especially as White Tārā) and as a goddess of nurturing quality and fertility. Her association with the wind element (vaayu) also means that she is swift in responding to calls for any aid.

According to Miranda Shaw, "Motherhood is central to the conception of Tara". Her titles include "loving mother", "supreme mother", "mother of the world", "universal mother" and "mother of all Buddhas". As such, Tārā embodies many of the qualities of feminine principle. She is known as the Mother of Mercy and Compassion. She is the source, the female aspect of the universe, which gives birth to warmth, compassion and relief from bad karma as experienced by ordinary beings in cyclic existence. She engenders, nourishes, smiles at the vitality of creation, and has sympathy for all beings as a mother does for her children.

Tārā is most often shown with the blue lotus or night lotus (utpala), which releases its fragrance with the appearance of the moon and therefore Tārā is also associated with the moon and night.

=== As a popular saviour deity ===
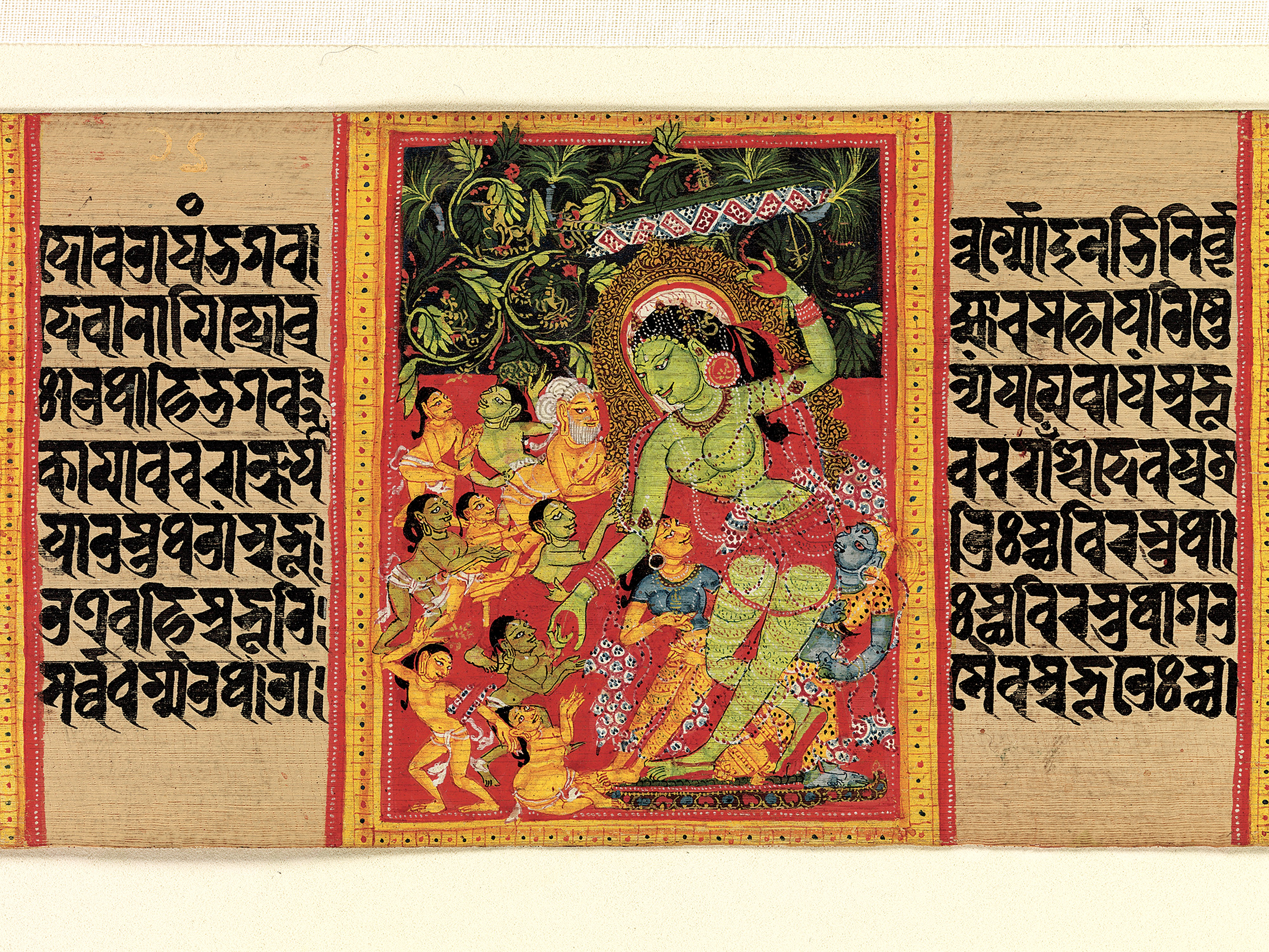
Green Tara giving boons to Devotees: Folio from a Manuscript of the Ashtasahasrika Prajnaparamita, Bengal

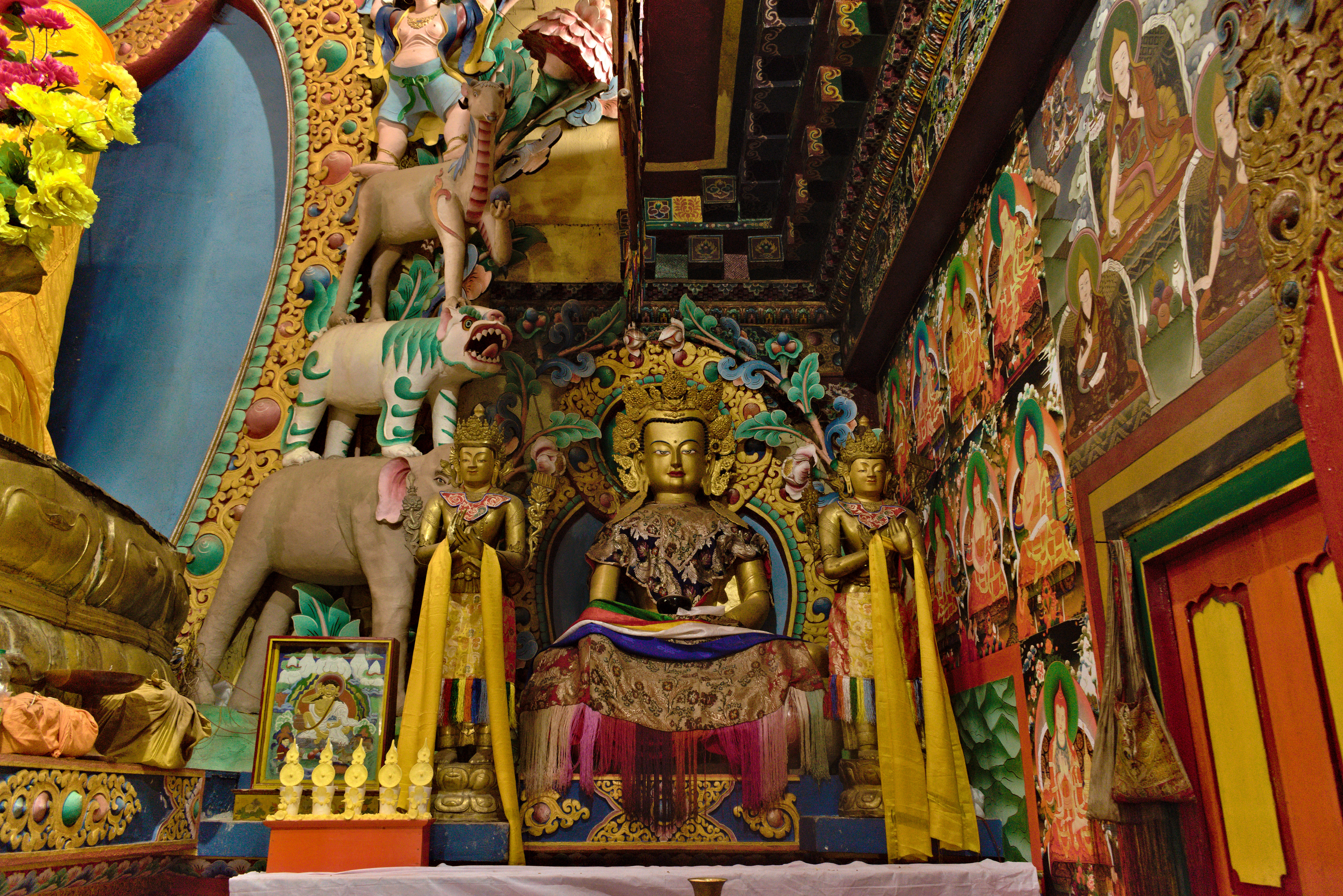
Statue of Tara in Tawang monastery

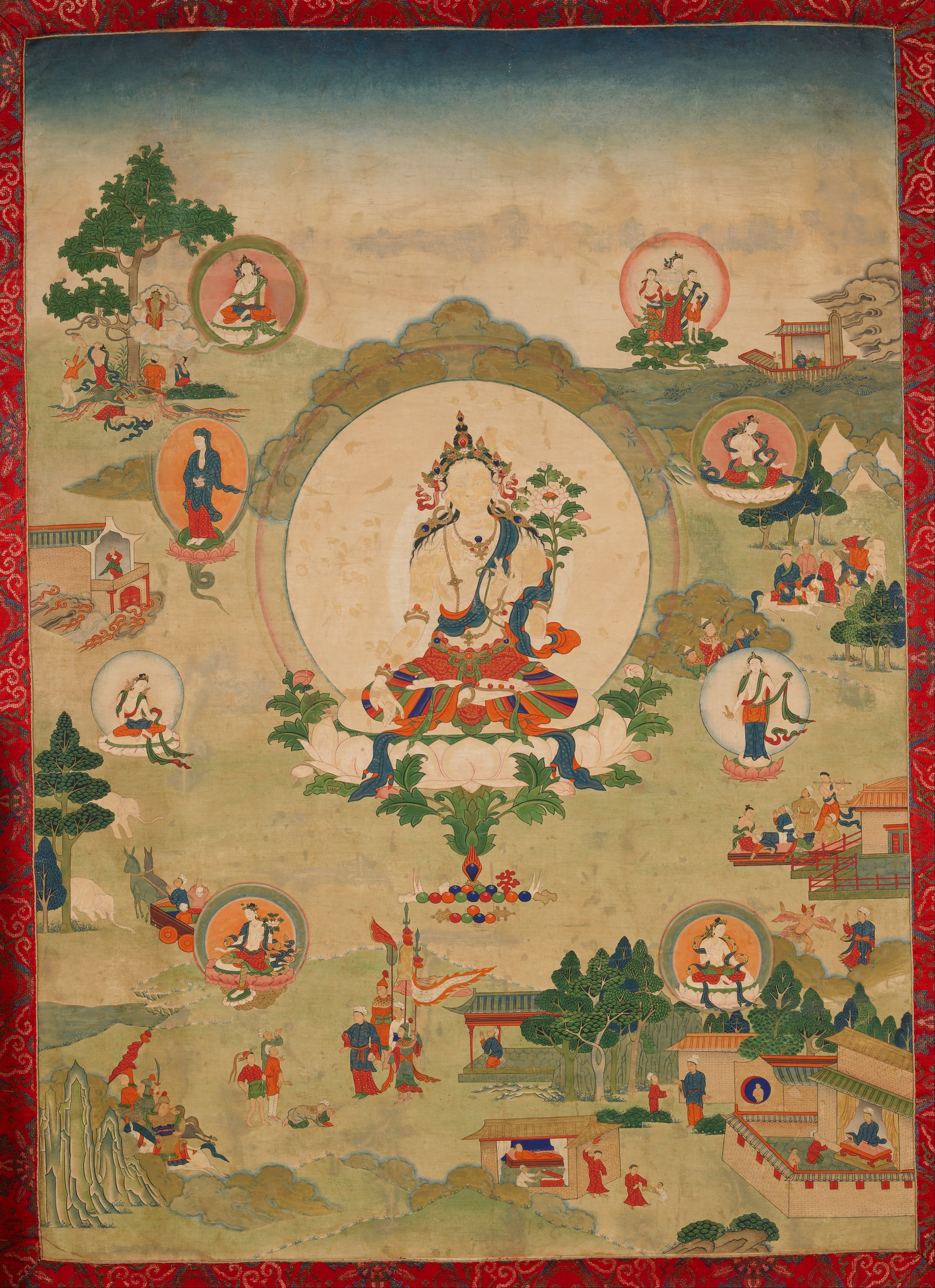
Tibetan style painting of White Tara (Sitatara) (c. 19th century) depicting her pacification of the eight fears and dangers in eight narrative illustrations around the main deity

In general, Tārā is especially seen as a savior who provides salvation and protection from the eight fears (aṣṭabhaya) or eight dangers (aṣṭaghora). This is a common theme in her iconography and she is sometimes depicted in a specific iconographical style called "Tara who protects from the eight dangers" (Tārāṣṭaghoratāraṇī).

According to The Noble Sūtra "Tārā Who Protects from the Eight Dangers" (*Āryatārāṣṭaghoratāraṇīsūtra), the eight dangers (aṣṭaghora) are: lions, elephants, fire, snakes, robbers, waters, infectious diseases, and demons. This sutra also contains an incantation (dharani) which is chanted to invoke Tārā's protection.

In Tibetan Buddhism, each of these outer dangers is also associated with an inner psychological meaning. As such, lions represent pride, wild elephants represent delusion, fires represent anger, snakes represent jealousy, bandits represent wrong views, bondage represent avarice, floods represent desire and attachment, and evil spirits and demons represent doubts.

With the development of esoteric or tantric Buddhism, two main ways of approaching Tara developed. In one, common folk and lay practitioners continued to directly appeal to her for protection and aid in worldly affairs, often chanting prayers, dharanis, or mantras to her and doing puja (worship rites). Tara's mantra and her twenty one verses of praise are widely learned and chanted by Tibetan laypersons. Tara also became a tantric deity whose secret practices and tantric sadhanas would be used by monks and yogis in order to develop her awakened qualities in themselves, ultimately leading to Buddhahood.

Another quality which Tara shares with feminine spirits (such as dakinis) is playfulness. As John Blofeld explains in Bodhisattva of Compassion, Tārā is frequently depicted as a young sixteen-year-old girlish woman. She often manifests in the lives of dharma practitioners when they take themselves, or the spiritual path too seriously. There are Tibetan tales in which she laughs at self-righteousness, or plays pranks on those who lack reverence for the feminine. In Magic Dance: The Display of the Self-Nature of the Five Wisdom Dakinis, Thinley Norbu explores this as "playmind".

Applied to Tārā, one could say that her playful mind can relieve ordinary minds that become rigidly serious or tightly gripped by dualistic distinctions. She takes delight in an open mind and a receptive heart, for in this openness and receptivity her blessings can naturally unfold and her energies can quicken the aspirant's spiritual development.

=== Pure Land and Buddha family ===
Tara also has her own pure land (buddhafield), called Arrayed in Turquoise Petals (Tibetan: Yurlod Kurpa or Yulokod). It is described as "Covered with manifold trees and creepers, resounding with the sound of many birds, and with murmur of waterfalls, thronged with wild beasts of many kinds; Many species of flowers grow everywhere."

According to Loppon Chandra Easton, this pure land is actually contained within Sukhavati, the pure land of Buddha Amitabha. Tara is thus associated with the Lotus Buddha family of Amitabha Buddha. Her association with Buddha Amitabha is also affirmed by Thubten Chodron, who discusses how Tara is part of Amitabha's buddha family (the Lotus family):

Amitabha Buddha rests on Tara's crown. Buddhist deities may be divided into five "families," related to the five Dhyani Buddhas. Amitabha Buddha is the head of the family to which both Tara and Chenresig belong. For this reason Amitabha sits on her crown. Amitabha is Tara's guru, her spiritual mentor.

Furthermore, she is also said to have a pure dwelling within Mount Potalaka, Avalokiteśvara's pure bodhimanda in this world.

== In Vajrayana ==
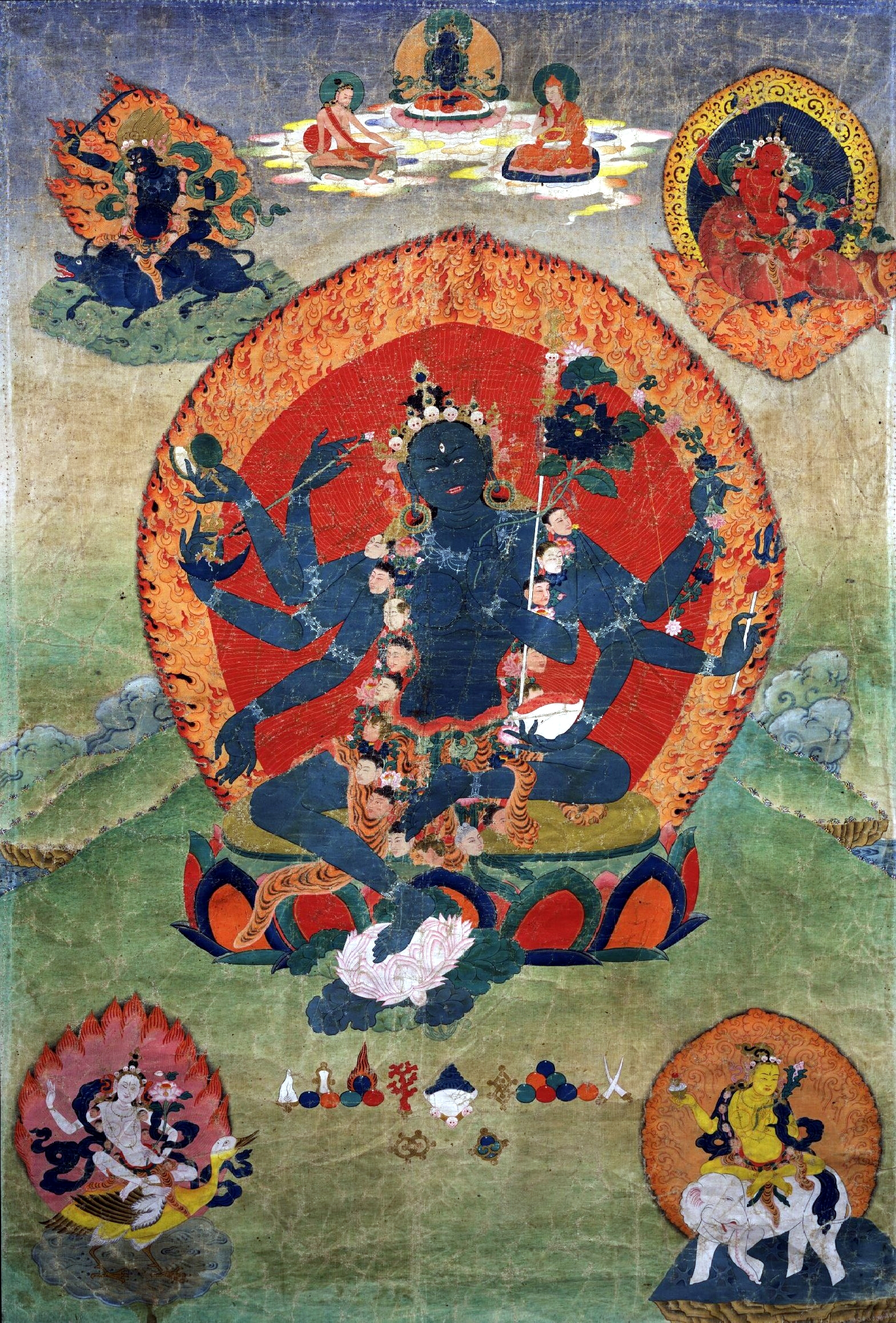
18th-century Eastern Tibetan thanka, with an esoteric Samaya Tara Yogini (Tibetan: dam tsig drol ma nal jor ma) in the center and the Blue, Red, White and Yellow taras in the corners, Rubin Museum of Art

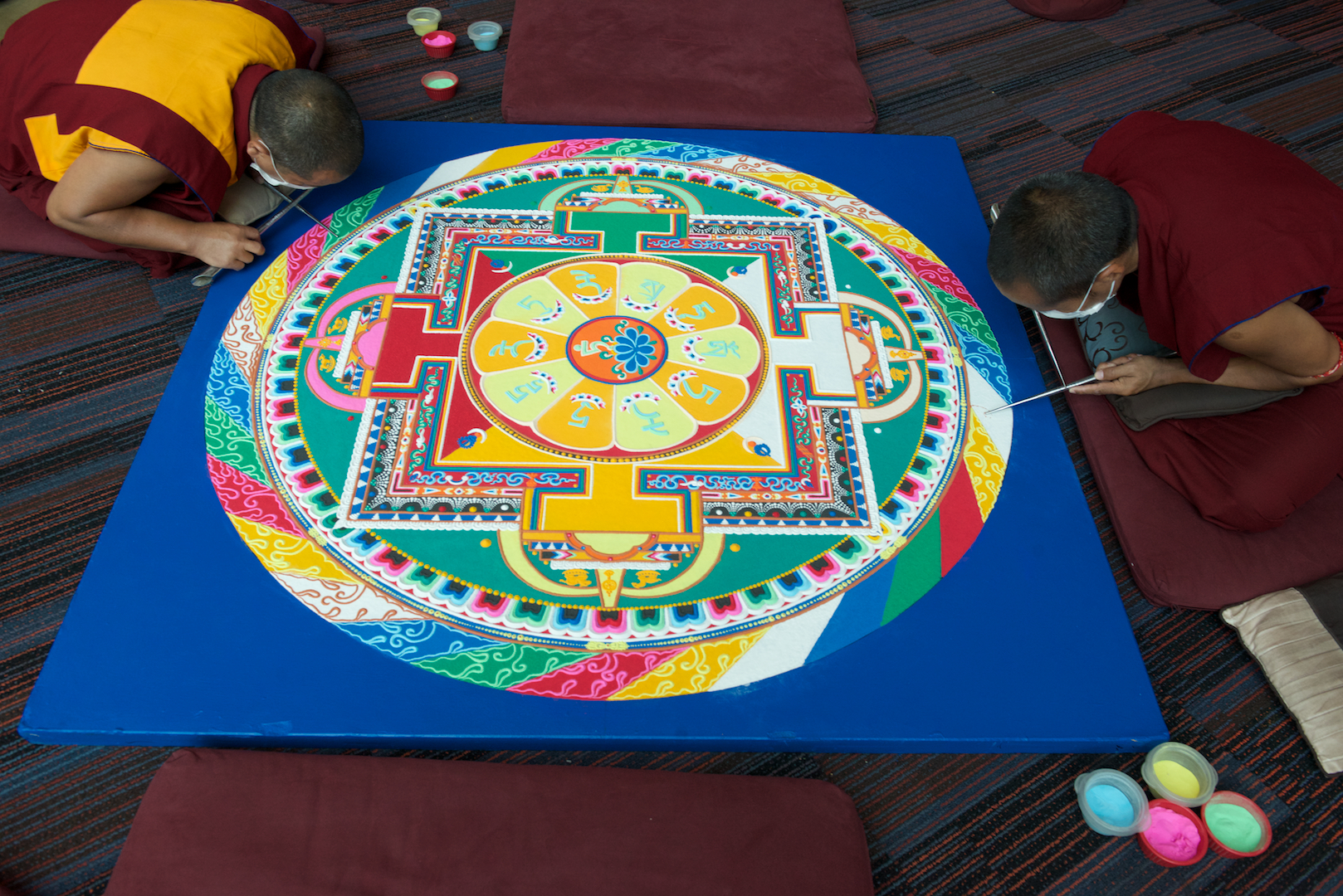
Sand mandala of Green Tara, constructed by Tibetan monks of Drepung Gomang Monastery in India at Kentucky Center for the Arts, 2017

Tārā as a focus for tantric deity yoga can be traced back to the time period of Padmasambhava. There is a Red Tārā practice which was given by Padmasambhava to Yeshe Tsogyal. He asked that she hide it as a treasure. It was not until the 20th century, that a great Nyingma lama, Apong Terton rediscovered it. It is said that this lama was reborn as Sakya Trizin, present head of the Sakyapa sect. A monk who had known Apong Terton succeeded in retransmitting it to Sakya Trizin, and the same monk also gave it to Chagdud Tulku Rinpoche, who released it to his western students.

Martin Willson in In Praise of Tārā traces many different lineages of Tārā Tantras, that is Tārā scriptures used as Tantric sadhanas. For example, a Tārā sadhana was revealed to Tilopa (988–1069 CE), the human father of the Karma Kagyu. Atisa, the great translator and founder of the Kadampa school of Tibetan Buddhism, was a devotee of Tārā. He composed a praise to her, and three Tārā Sadhanas. Martin Willson's work also contains charts which show origins of her tantras in various lineages, but suffice to say that Tārā as a tantric practice quickly spread from around the 7th century CE onwards, and remains an important part of Vajrayana Buddhism to this day.

The practices themselves usually present Tārā as a tutelary deity (thug dam, yidam) which the practitioners sees as being a latent aspect of one's mind, or a manifestation in a visible form of a quality stemming from Buddha Jnana. As John Blofeld puts it in The Tantric Mysticism of Tibet:

The function of the Yidam is one of the profound mysteries of the Vajrayana...Especially during the first years of practice the Yidam is of immense importance. Yidam is the Tibetan rendering of the Sanskrit word "Iṣṭadeva"—the in-dwelling deity; but, where the Hindus take the Iṣṭadeva for an actual deity who has been invited to dwell in the devotee's heart, the Yidams of Tantric Buddhism are in fact the emanations of the adept's own mind. Or are they? To some extent they seem to belong to that order of phenomena which in Jungian terms are called archetypes and are therefore the common property of the entire human race. Even among Tantric Buddhists, there may be a division of opinion as to how far the Yidams are the creations of individual minds. What is quite certain is that they are not independently existing gods and goddesses; and yet, paradoxically, there are many occasions when they must be so regarded.

=== Mantras ===
The Mantra of Tārā Oṃ tāre tuttāre ture svāhā in the Lañja variant of Ranjana and Tibetan alphabets

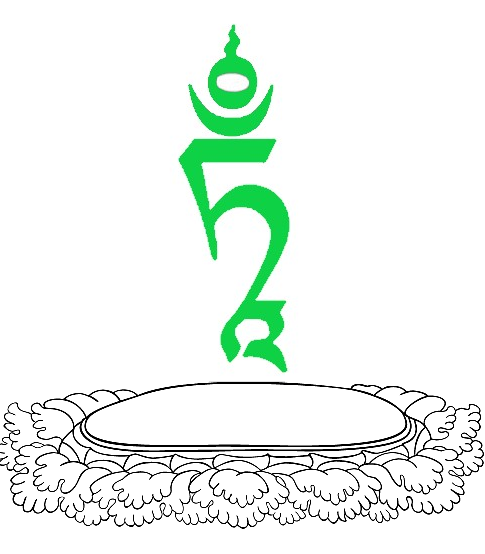
tāṃ, the seed syllable (bijamantra) of Green Tara in Tibetan script. In some Vajrayana practices, one visualizes the seed syllable of Tara.

The various systems of Vajrayana Tārā practice contain numerous mantras for Tara. Technically speaking, a Tārā mantra is termed a "vidyā" (the proper term for a mantra of a female deity). The main vidyā mantra of Tārā is: Oṃ tāre tuttāre ture svāhā. This is the most popularly recited mantra of the deity and is her root (mula) mantra. Tāre tuttāre ture is in the vocative case. Tāre is the basic name of the deity ("O Tara"). Tuttāre (prefixed by ud-) refers to Tara as "the one who helps [beings] to cross" the ocean of saṃsāra, and who "pulls [them] up" (ut-tārā). Turā, the third epithet, means "swift".

Many Tārā mantras build off this base vidyā mantra by adding various mantric words which activate different functions of the deity, such as pacification or subjugation. As Beyer notes, one way to do this is to add a phrase like "sarva ____ śāntiṃkuru" (pacify all ____ ) in between ture and svāhā. Different terms may be inserted into the blank here, depending on what activity is required, such as grahān (evil spirits), vighnān (hindering demons), vyādhīn (diseases), upadravān (injuries), akālamṛtyūn (untimely deaths), duḥsvapnān (bad dreams), cittākulāni (confusions), śatrūn (enemies), bhayopadravān (terrors and injuries), duṣkṛtāni (evil deeds). Thus, for example, if one wanted to pacify evil spirits, one could recite: Oṃ tāre tuttāre ture sarva grahān śāntiṃkuru svāhā.

Other appendixes may be added to the mantra in the same manner. For example, sarvapāpaṃ āvaraṇa viśuddhe (cleanse all evil and obscurations), or dhanaṃ me dehi (give me wealth). Other extensions of the basic vidyā mantra include a common mantra for wrathful forms of Tārā: Oṃ tāre tuttāre ture hūṃ phaṭ, and a common mantra for White Tārā used to increase lifespan is: Oṃ tāre tuttāre ture mama ayuḥ punya jñānā puśtiṃ kuru svāhā.

Tara's seed mantra (bijamantra) is tāṃ. This seed syllable is often visualized in Tara sadhanas (meditative rites. spiritual practices). This seed syllable may also appear in longer Tārā mantras. For example, there is a common Red Tārā mantra which goes: Oṃ tāre tāṃ svāhā.

Some traditions also contain a mantra for each of the twenty one Tārās, which are used to invoke a specific activity of Tara, like Atiśa's lineage of Tara practice, which is one of the most popular systems in Tibetan Buddhism. The main source for this system is Atiśa Dīpaṃkaraśrījñāna's (982–1054 CE) Sādhana of the Twenty-One Tārās (sgrol ma nyi shu rtsa gcig gi sgrub thabs).

Thus, in Atiśa's tradition, the mantra of Swift and Heroic Tārā (used for subduing enemies and hindrances) is Oṃ tāre tuttāre ture vāśaṃ kuru svāhā, the mantra of White Tārā (for healing and longevity): Oṃ tāre tuttāre ture śāntiṃ kuru svāhā and the mantra of Golden Tara (for increasing and wealth): Oṃ tāre tuttāre ture puṣṭīṃ kuru svāhā.

Other Atiśa tradition Tārā mantras require one to insert a specific name into it. For example, the mantra of Tārā who utters hūṃ allows you to influence or seduce a person, and thus is structured as follows: Oṃ tāre tuttāre ture [name of person] ākarṣaya hrī svāhā.

=== Prayers and dharanis ===
There are various prayers, odes (stotras) and dharanis associated with Tara. The most famous is certainly the Praise to Tara in Twenty One Verses (Namastāraikaviṃśatistotra) which is found in numerous sources, including in the Tara Tantra (Tohoku no. 726), which calls the prayer a dhāraṇī. This prayer is recited daily by many monastics and laypersons of the Himalayan Vajrayana traditions. There are numerous commentaries to this praise, including three commentaries attributed to Sūryagupta.

One popular short prayer or dhāraṇī is often found coupled together with the Praise to Tara in Twenty One Verses. This is called the "praise rooted in mantra" since it contains the basic Tara mantra. This is also a popular prayer in Vajrayana Buddhism. This prayer is:

namas tāre ture vīre tuttāre bhayanāśini ture sarvārthade tāre svāhā kāre namo’stute

Om! Homage! O TARE, Swift One, Heroine! TUTTARE who eliminates fears! TURE, the Saviouress granting all benefits! Sound of SVAHA, worshipped and praised!

An esoteric sūtra titled Tārā Who Protects from the Eight Dangers (*Tārāṣṭaghoratāraṇī) teaches the following dharani which can be recited as an aid to liberation:

oṁ, bodhisattva great lady, goddess, please protect us!

oṁ nama āryāvalokiteśvarāya bodhisattvāya mahāsattvāya mahākāruṇikāya | tadyathā |

oṁ tāre tuttāre ture sarvaduṣṭān praduṣṭān mama kṛte jambhaya stambhaya mohaya bandhaya hūṁ hūṁ hūṁ phaṭ phaṭ phaṭ svāhā |

nama āryāvalobhayā narā bodhisattvā mahāsattvāni adhiṣṭhānādhiṣṭhite mama sarvakarmāvaraṇa svabhāvaśuddhe viśuddhe śodhaya viśodhaya hūṁ phaṭ svāhā |

Another Tārā dhāraṇī is found in The Hundred and Eight Names of the Goddess Tārā (Tārādevīnāmāṣṭaśataka). This text also contains a set of verses that give one hundred and eight epithets of the deity.

=== Sadhanas ===
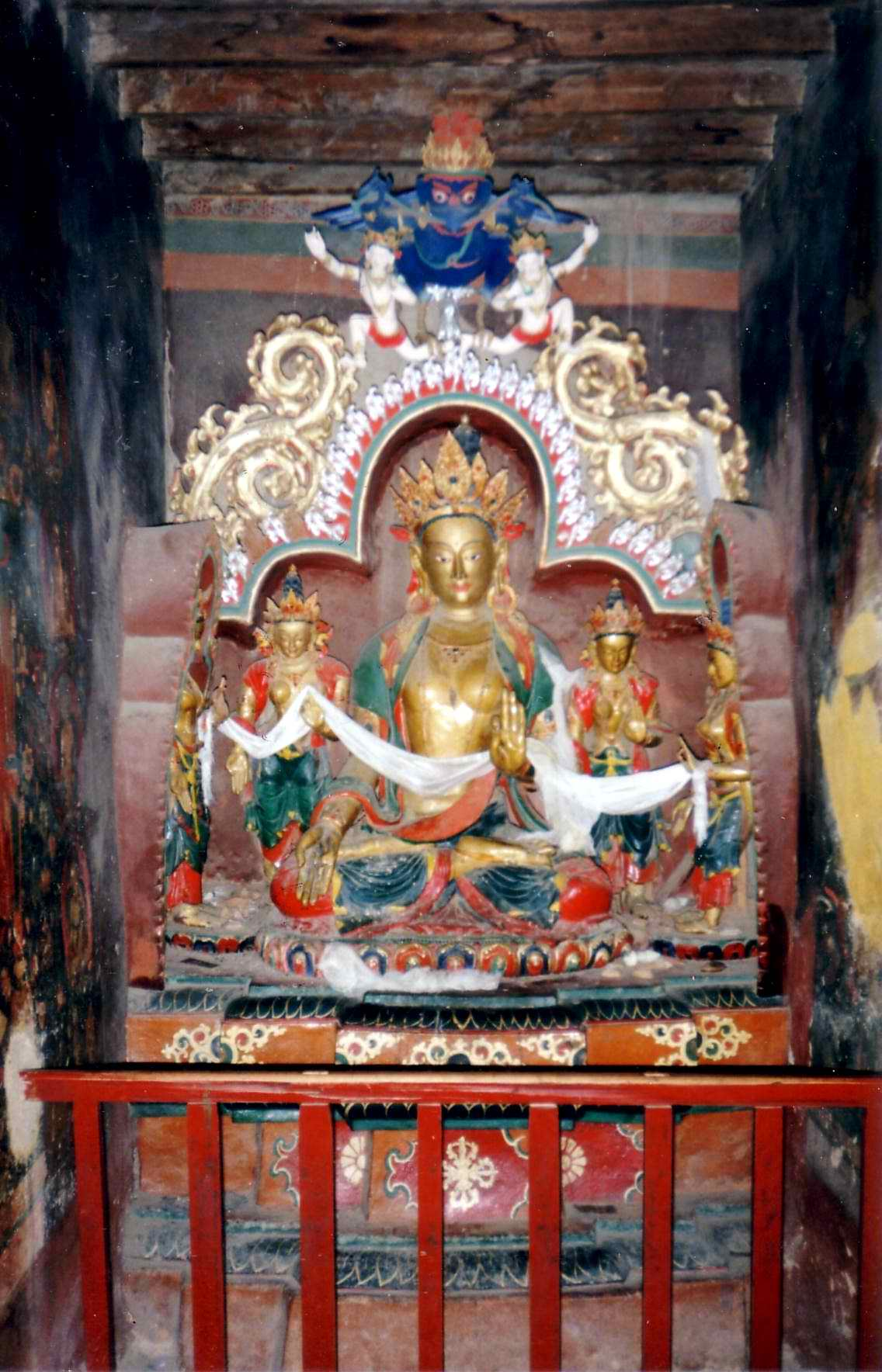
Tara statue. Gyantse Kumbum. 1993

Sadhanas in which Tārā is the yidam (meditational deity) can be extensive or quite brief. Most all of them include some introductory praises or homages to invoke her presence and prayers of taking refuge. Then her mantra is recited, followed by a visualization of her, perhaps more mantra, then the visualization is dissolved, followed by a dedication of the merit from doing the practice. Additionally there may be extra prayers of aspirations, and a long life prayer for the Lama who originated the practice. Many of the Tārā sadhanas are seen as beginning practices within the world of Vajrayana Buddhism, however what is taking place during the visualization of the deity actually invokes some of the most sublime teachings of all Buddhism.

In this case during the creation phase of Tārā as a yidam, she is seen as having as much reality as any other phenomena apprehended through the mind. By reciting her mantra and visualizing her form in front, or on the head of the adept, one is opening to her energies of compassion and wisdom. After a period of time the practitioner shares in some of these qualities, becomes imbued with her being and all it represents. At the same time all of this is seen as coming out of Emptiness and having a translucent quality like a rainbow. Then many times there is a visualization of oneself as Tārā. One simultaneously becomes inseparable from all her good qualities while at the same time realizing the emptiness of the visualization of oneself as the yidam and also the emptiness of one's ordinary self.

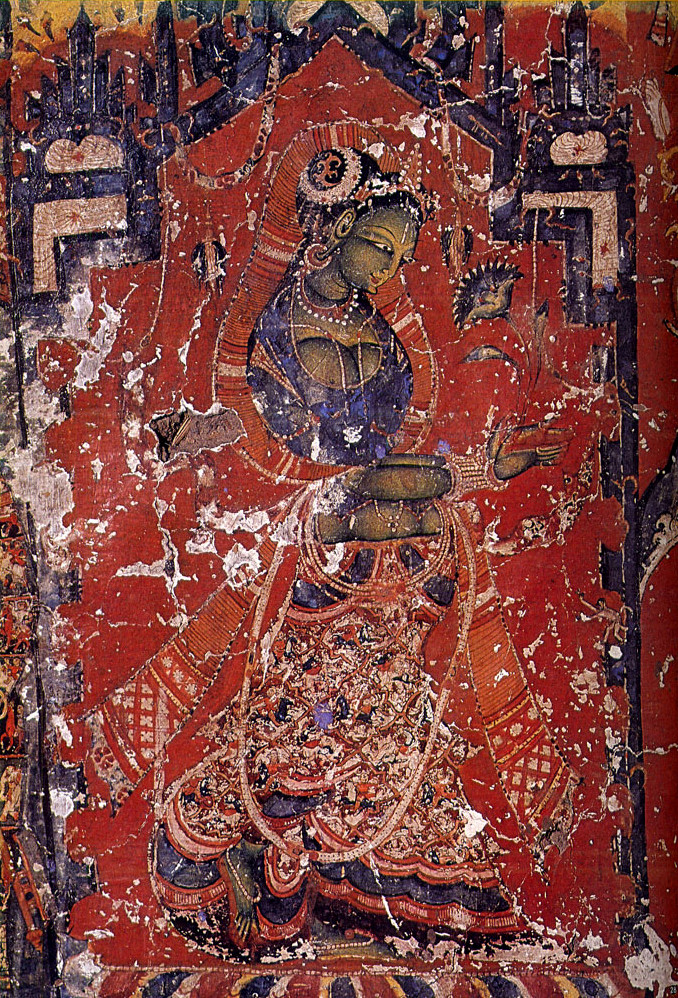
Green Tārā, (Syamatara) known as the Buddha of enlightened activity, c. 11th century, Alci Monastery

This occurs in the completion stage of the practice. One dissolves the created deity form and at the same time also realizes how much of what we call the "self" is a creation of the mind, and has no long term substantial inherent existence. This part of the practice then is preparing the practitioner to be able to confront the dissolution of one's self at death and ultimately be able to approach through various stages of meditation upon emptiness, the realization of Ultimate Truth as a vast display of Emptiness and Luminosity. At the same time the recitation of the mantra has been invoking Tārā's energy through its Sanskrit seed syllables and this purifies and activates certain energy centers of the body (chakras). This also untangles knots of psychic energy which have hindered the practitioner from developing a Vajra body, which is necessary to be able to progress to more advanced practices and deeper stages of realization.

Therefore, even in a simple Tārā sadhana a plethora of outer, inner, and secret events is taking place and there are now many works such as Deity Yoga, compiled by the present Dalai Lama, which explores all the ramifications of working with a yidam in Tantric practices.

The end results of doing such Tārā practices are many. For one thing it reduces the forces of delusion in the forms of negative karma, sickness, afflictions of kleshas, and other obstacles and obscurations.

The mantra helps generate Bodhicitta within the heart of the practitioner and purifies the psychic channels (nadis) within the body allowing a more natural expression of generosity and compassion to flow from the heart center. Through experiencing Tārā's perfected form one acknowledges one's own perfected form, that is one's intrinsic Buddha nature, which is usually covered over by obscurations and clinging to dualistic phenomena as being inherently real and permanent.

The practice then weans one away from a coarse understanding of Reality, allowing one to get in touch with inner qualities similar to those of a bodhisattva, and prepares one's inner self to embrace finer spiritual energies, which can lead to more subtle and profound realizations of the Emptiness of phenomena and self.

As Chagdud Tulku Rinpoche, in his Introduction to the Red Tārā Sadhana, notes of his lineage: "Tārā is the flawless expression of the inseparability of emptiness, awareness and compassion. Just as you use a mirror to see your face, Tārā meditation is a means of seeing the true face of your mind, devoid of any trace of delusion".

There are several preparations to be done before practising the Sadhana. To perform a correct execution the practitioner must be prepared and take on the proper disposition. The preparations may be grouped as "internal" and "external". Both are necessary to achieve the required concentration.

The preparations are of two types: external and internal. The external preparations consist of cleaning the meditation room, setting up a shrine with images of Buddha Shakyamuni and Green Tara, and setting out a beautiful arrangement of offerings. We can use water to represent nectar for drinking, water for bathing the feet, and perfume. For the remaining offerings—flowers, incense, light, and pure food—if possible we should set out the actual substances. As for internal preparations, we should try to improve our compassion, bodhichitta, and correct view of emptiness through the practice of the stages of the path, and to receive a Tantric empowerment of Green Tara. It is possible to participate in group pujas if we have not yet received an empowerment, but to gain deep experience of this practice we need to receive an empowerment. The main internal preparation is to generate and strengthen our faith in Arya Tara, regarding her as the synthesis of all Gurus, Yidams, and Buddhas.

=== Tibetan revealed texts ===
Terma teachings are "hidden teachings" said to have been left by Padmasambhava (8th century) and others for the benefit of future generations. Jamyang Khyentse Wangpo discovered Phagme Nyingthig (Tib. spelling: 'chi med 'phags ma'i snying thig, Innermost Essence teachings of the Immortal Bodhisattva [Arya Tārā]).

Earlier in the 19th century, according to a biography, Nyala Pema Dündul received a Hidden Treasure, Tārā Teaching and Nyingthig (Tib. nying thig) from his uncle Kunsang Dudjom (Tib. kun bzang bdud 'joms). It is not clear from the source whether the terma teaching and the nyingthig teachings refer to the same text or two different texts.

== Forms ==
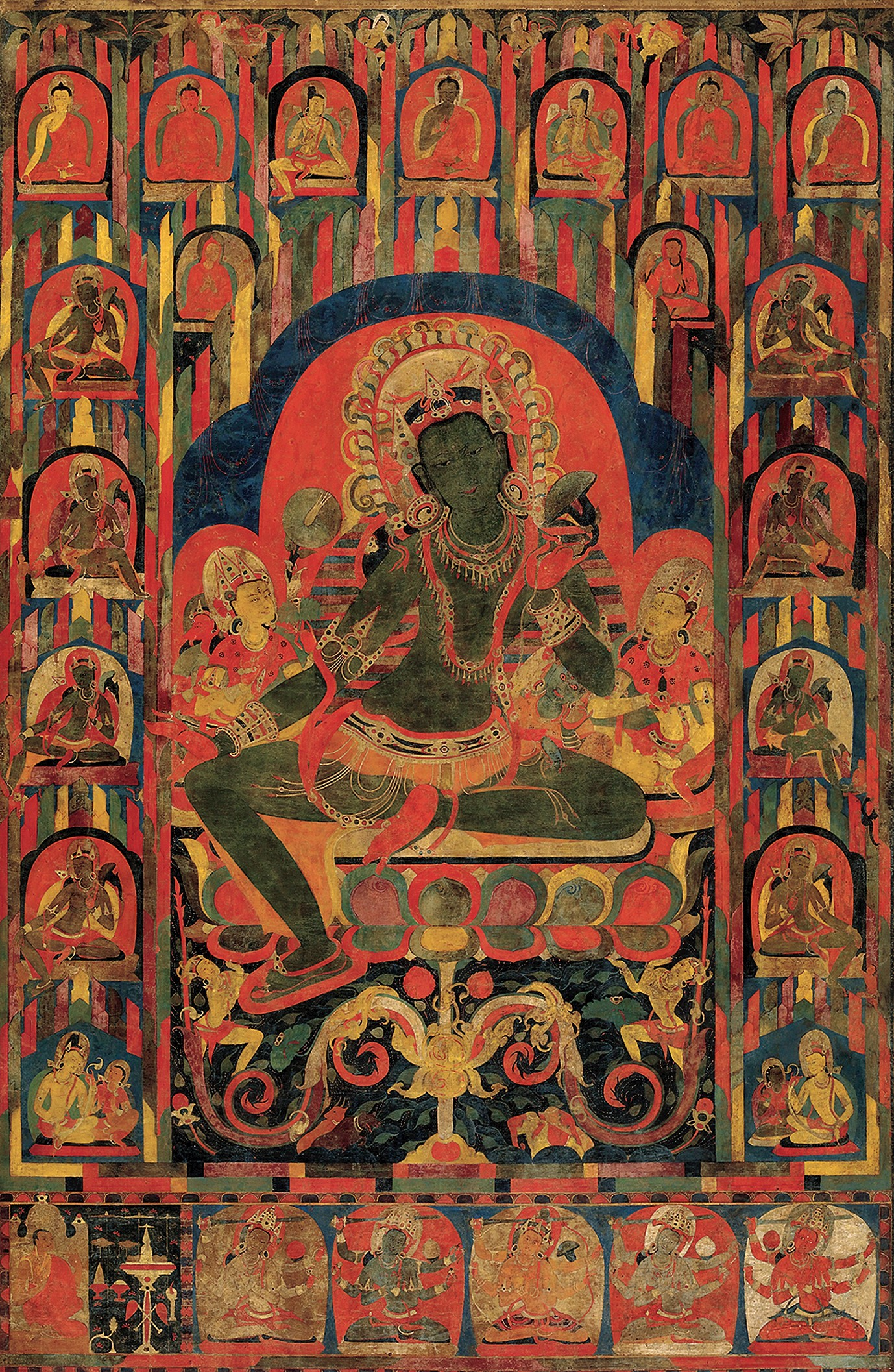
Green Tara, tempera on cloth, 1160s–1180s. Collection of John and Berthe Ford, Promised gift to the Walters Art Museum, Baltimore

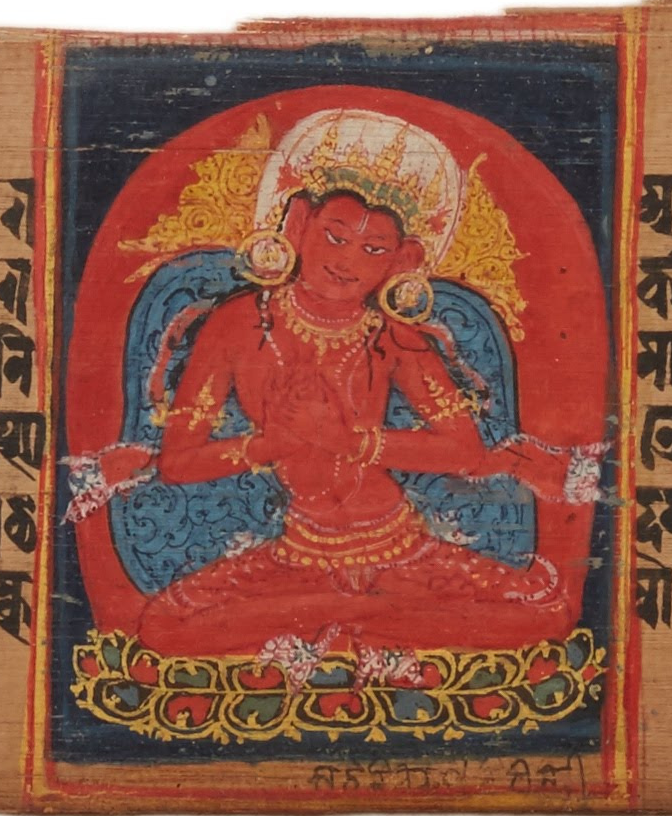
Red Tara from an Aṣṭasāhasrikā Prajñāpāramitā Sūtra Manuscript

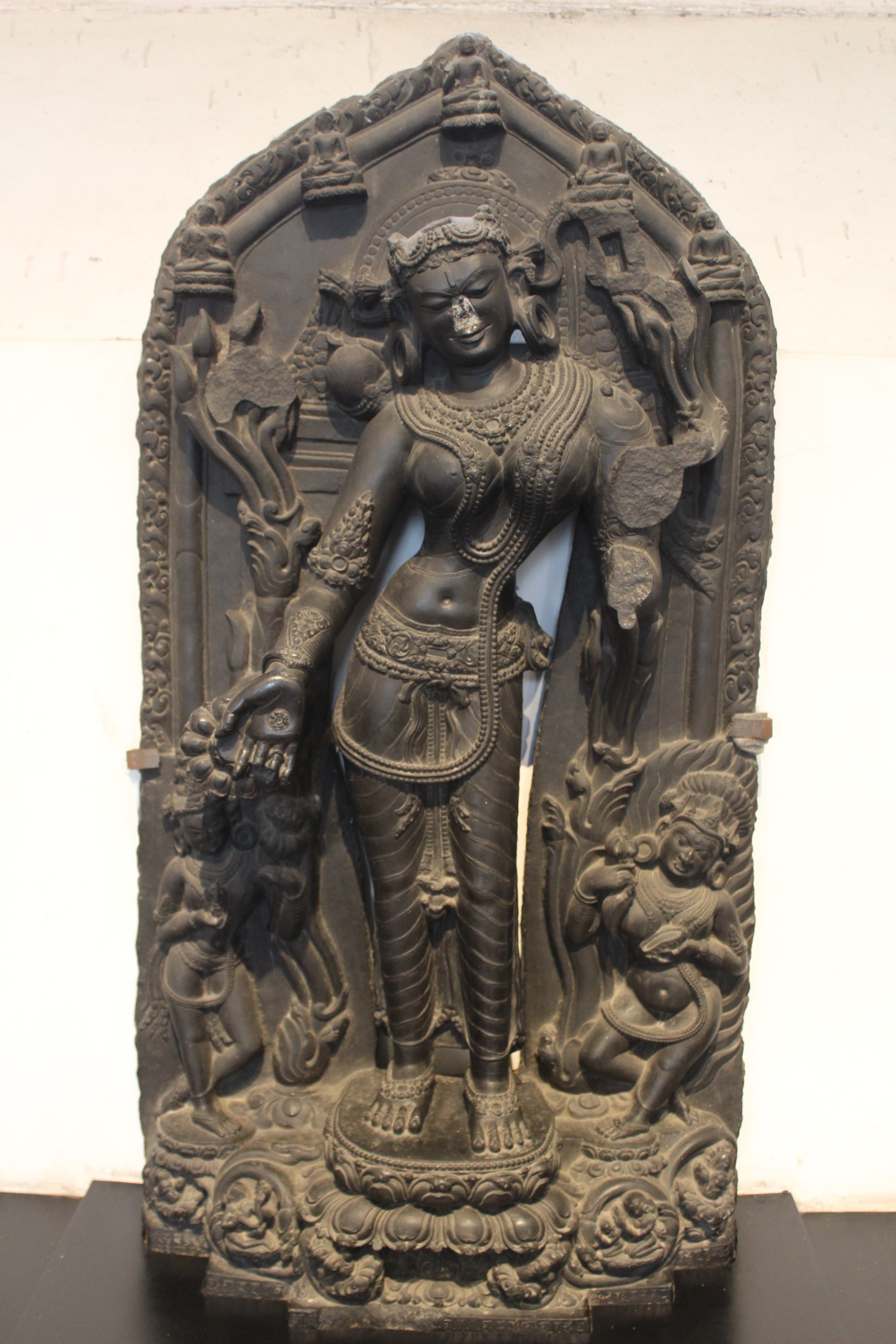
Khadira forest Tara, black basalt, Bihar, 10th century

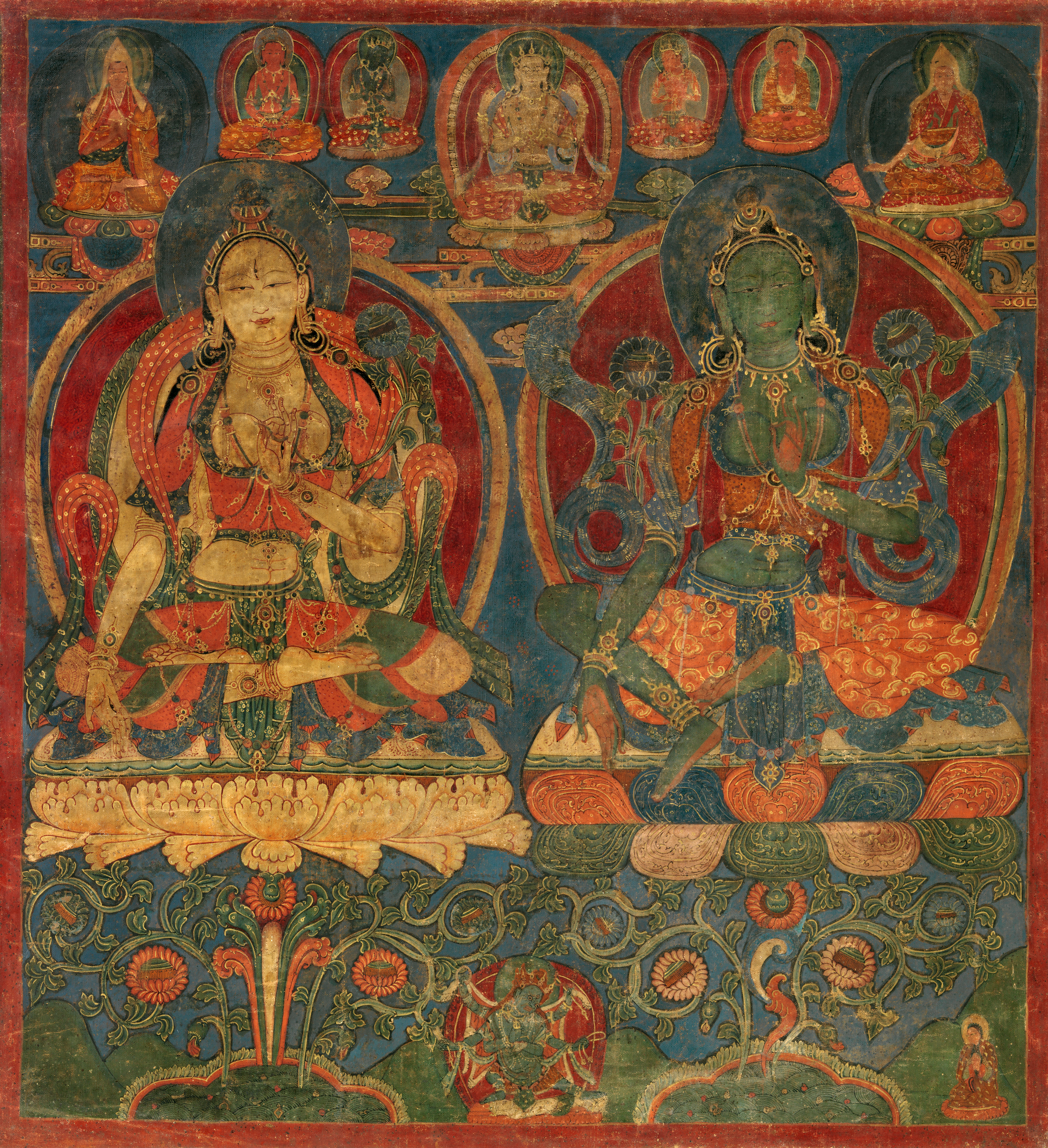
White Tara and Green Tara

There are many forms of Tārā, including various popular lists of 21 different forms or emanations of Tārā. "Green Tārā" (Skt. śyāmatārā), who is associated with peacefulness and enlightened activity, is the most depicted form of the goddess in Indo-Tibetan Buddhism. This is generally considered Tārā's main form, out of which the other twenty one forms arise. One common variation of Green Tārā is known as Khadiravaṇi-Tārā (Tārā of the acacia forest) and appears in a forest with flowers in her hair while accompanied by her two attendants Mārīcī and Ekajaṭā.

Another popular form is White Tārā (Sitatārā), often shown with two arms seated on a white lotus and with eyes on her hand and feet, as well as a third eye on her forehead (thus she is also known as "Seven eyed"). She is known for compassion, long life, healing, and serenity. Red forms of Tārā are also quite common, and their main activity is power and enthrallment or magnetizing (Skt. vaśīkaraṇa, the "power to control and subjugate").

Tārā is generally considered to have many forms, all of which are various adaptations to the needs of all living beings. According to Dharmachari Purna:

Tārā is in fact the name of a whole class of deities. She appears in all the five colours of the Jinas. There are at least ten green forms, seven white, five yellow, two blue and one red. As Sarvajñamitra says of her form: 'It is a universal form, varied like crystal, since it changes according to circumstance'.She has both peaceful and wrathful forms. Her figure is shown in virtually all postures from standing to sitting, full lotus, half lotus, one leg down, and both legs down. There is apparently also a reclining Tārā. She has two-armed forms, four arms, eight arms, twelve arms, and Getty even mentions a Tibetan painting showing a standing Tārā with 'one thousand heads and arms'. Ghosh lists seventy-six distinct forms of Tārā, and tradition tells us there are one hundred and eight names for her.

There are numerous lists of "twenty one Tārās" found in Tibetan Buddhism, a tradition which is found in the Indic sources as well, beginning with the tantric The Praise in Twenty-one Homages (Skt. Namastāraikaviṃśatistotraguṇahitasahita, in full: The Praise to Tara with Twenty-One Verses of Homage, and the Excellent Benefits of Reciting the Praise, Derge no. 438). Indian authors like Sūryagupta (a.k.a. Ravigupta, c. 7th–8th century), Candragomin and Atisha also wrote texts discussing "twenty one Tārās" and the Tārā lineages of these figures are still found in Tibetan Buddhism. Another different list is found in the Indian Sadhanamala.

These Indian lineages have lists which contain different forms of Tārā. There are also other Tibetan lineages with different lists of twenty one forms of Tārā, including that of Longchenpa, Jigme Lingpa and Choggyur Lingpa.

=== Nine Tārā mandala ===
The Tārā Tantra contains a mandala of nine Tārās, each one is a different color, but all are depicted as young women covered in jewels, with earrings and ornaments. The nine Tārās are:

1. Green Tārā, with one head and two arms, who resides at the center of the mandala. One hand makes the gesture of granting boons (varada) and the other hand holds a blue utpala flower.
2. Dark blue Tārā is found in the eastern quarter of the mandala. She is a youth who holds a trident and an utpala flower.
3. Gold Tārā is found in the southern quarter of the mandala. She holds a sword and an utpala flower.
4. Red Tārā is found in the western quarter of the mandala. She holds a wheel and an utpala flower.
5. Green Tārā in the northern quarter of the mandala. She holds a parasol and an utpala flower.
6. Hook Tārā in the eastern gate of the mandala. She is white, wrathful, and carries a hook in each hand.
7. Lasso Tārā in the southern gate of the mandala. She is yellow, wrathful, and carries a lasso in each hand.
8. Shackles Tārā in the western gate, red skinned, wrathful, holding shackles.
9. Bell Tārā in the northern gate, blue-green colored, wrathful, holding a bell in each hand.

=== Sūryagupta's Tārās ===
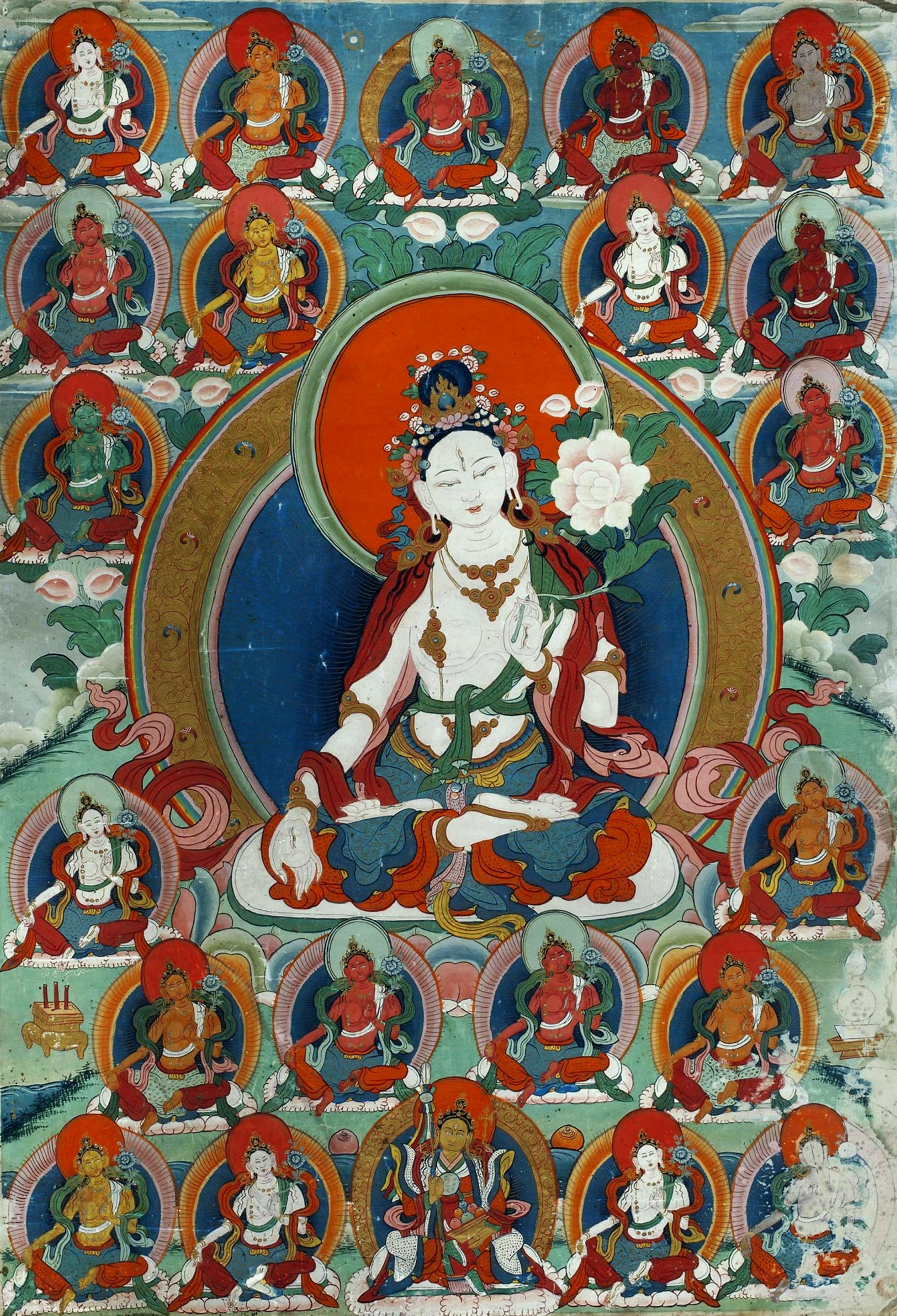
Mongolian thangka of White Tara with other forms of Tara

Sūryagupta was a devotee of Tārā and wrote at least five commentaries on the Praise in Twenty-One Homages. His explanation of various forms of Tārā is the earliest one in the Indian tradition. In his tradition, which has been widely studied by scholars, each form of the goddess has different attributes, color and activity (such as pacifying, magnetizing, longevity, subduing enemies, etc).

Each form of Tārā also goes by slightly different names. The Sūryagupta list of Tārās actually contains twenty two forms, with one main or central deity, which is Green Tārā, Khadiravaṇī, who is blue-green, and the twenty one Tārās. The order of the list below follows Sūryagupta's commentary:

- Swift Courageous Tārā or Heroic Tārā (Skt. Tārā Tura-vīrā or Tārā Pravīrā) - red in color "radiating fiery light, [with] one face with two eyes, and eight arms." Her arms hold various weapons like a bow and arrow. This Tārā controls and reverses negative and evil influences, both internal and external influences.
- Tārā White like the Autumn Moon or Brilliant Moon Tārā (Skt. Tārā Śuklakānti or Tārā Candra-kānti), this is a three faced twelve armed white Tārā with peaceful powers, she is particularly known for the pacification of defilement and disease. The three faces represent the trikaya.
- Golden Coloured Tārā (Skt. Tārā Kanaka-varṇī), this ten armed gold Tārā specializes in the activity of increasing: increasing lifespan, resources, and wisdom
- Tārā Crown Jewel the Tathāgatas or Victorious Crown Jewel Tārā (Skt. Tārā Tathāgatoṣṇīṣā or Tārā Uṣṇīṣa-vijayā), the uṣṇīṣa is a protuberance on the Buddha's head, this four armed gold Tārā is known for neutralizing poison, increasing life and preventing premature death.
- Tārā sounding Hūṃ (Skt. Tārā Hūṃ-kāra-nādinī or Tārā Hūṃ-svara-nādinī), slight fierce in countenance and golden color. She is shown stamping her feet, an act that sounds the syllable Hūṃ, which reverses negative influences and draws sentient beings to the Dharma.
- Tārā, Victor Over the Three Worlds (Skt. Tārā Trailokavijayā), depicted ruby red or reddish black, this Tārā subdues and controls all deities and spirits, including devas like Indra and Agni as well as yakshas. She also purifies obscurations and negativities.
- Destroyer Tārā or Enemy crusher Tārā (Skt. Tārā Pramardinī or Tārā Apavādi-pramardanī), a fierce black Tārā with a wrathful looking face holding a sword who is known for subduing dark and demonic forces, external and internal. She is also associated with a phowa ritual which transfers the mindstream to the pure land at the time of death.
- Mara destroyer Tārā (who bestows excellence) (Skt. Tārā Māra-mardaneśvarī or Tārā Māra-sūdanī-vaśitottama-dā) - a golden colored Tārā with a fierce frown who can destroy the four Maras (death, the defiled aggregates, the defilements, and the Mara the deity) which are the obstacles to awakening.
- Tārā of the Khadira Forest (Skt. Tārā Khadira-vaṇī), a "shining blue-green" Tārā who holds a blue lotus and appears in a lush forest of fragrant Khadira trees. She is depicted accompanied by Marici and Ekajata. She is the principal Tārā in the Sūryagupta tradition. Interestingly enough
- Tārā granter of boons (Skt. Tārā Vara-dā), is sometimes depicted as a red Tārā who grants all precious things to all beings.
- Tārā dispeller of sorrow (Skt. Śoka-vinodana Tārā), a red Tārā who fulfills desires and subjugates evil
- Tārā magnetiser of all beings (dispeller of misfortune) (Skt. Tārā Jagad-vaśī or Tārā Jagad-vaśī-riṣṭa-nirvahaṇī), her power is to increase enjoyments, and wealth, she is the "color of darkness".
- Auspicious light Tārā or Tārā giver of prosperity (Skt. Tārā Maṅgalālokā or Kalyāna-dā Tārā), a gold Tārā with eight arms and a crescent moon ornament. She gives off a white light for pacifying negativities and a yellow light for increasing goodness. She is sometimes depicted with Amitabha at her crown.
- Tārā who ripens all (Skt. Tārā Paripācakā), a red fierce looking Tārā depicted amid a cosmic fire. She subdues the hindrances and protects from fear and danger.
- Furrowed Brow Tārā, or Tārā the enthraller of all (Skt. Tārā Bhṛkuṭī or Tārā Vaśīkārī), a dark Tārā with three wrathful faces and a necklace of skulls. She is shown dancing, trampling a corpse and stamping her foot. She destroys all things which interfere with the Dharma and the welfare of sentient beings.
- Great peaceful Tārā (Skt. Tārā Mahā-śānti), a white peaceful Tārā with six arms, associated with happiness, purification and pacification of negative karma
- Tārā destroyer of attachment (Skt. Tārā Rāga-niṣūdanī), a beautiful red Tārā holding a trident who amplifies the power of mantras and removes negative thoughts.
- Tārā who accomplishes bliss (Skt. Tārā Sukha-sādhanī), she is orange and holds a moon disk at her chest. She is known for eliminating dark magic mantras and for binding thieves.
- White victorious Tārā (Skt. Tārā Vijayā or Tārā Sita-vijayā), a white Tārā known for dispelling disease, particularly leprosy
- Tārā consumer of suffering (Skt. Tārā Duḥkha-dahanī), a white Tārā who eliminates conflict, nightmares, negative thoughts, and poisons. She is also associated with freedom from prison.
- Tārā giver of attainments (Skt. Tārā Siddhi-saṃbhavā) an orange Tārā who grants special powers (siddhis) like invisibility and also heals diseases
- Tārā who perfects all (Skt. Tārā Pari-pūraṇī), a white Tārā sitting on a bull who can take one to the Pure land of Akanishta

=== Ferocious Tārā - Tārā of Greater China ===
One notable form of Tārā is the dark Ugra Tārā (Ferocious or Terrible Tara) also known as Mahācīnakrama Tārā (Tib: gya nag gi rim pa drol ma, Tara in the Tradition of Greater China). This form of Tārā is notable because it was later imported into Hindu tantra from Buddhist sources like the Sadhanamala and the Sadhanasamuccaya. This Hindu Tara remains an important deity in Hindu Shakta traditions, where she is one of the ten Mahāvidyā goddesses.

Ferocious Tārā is dark / black (nīla) with one face and four arms. She stands on a corpse, and holds a sword, a cutter (kartri), a blue lotus and a skullcup. She sports a single knot of hair with Aksobhya Buddha on her head.

Iconographically, Ferocious Tara is almost identical to one form of another goddess, Ekajaṭā (also known as Ekajaṭī or Blue Tara). As such, some authors identify the two forms.

=== Other forms or emanations of Tārā ===
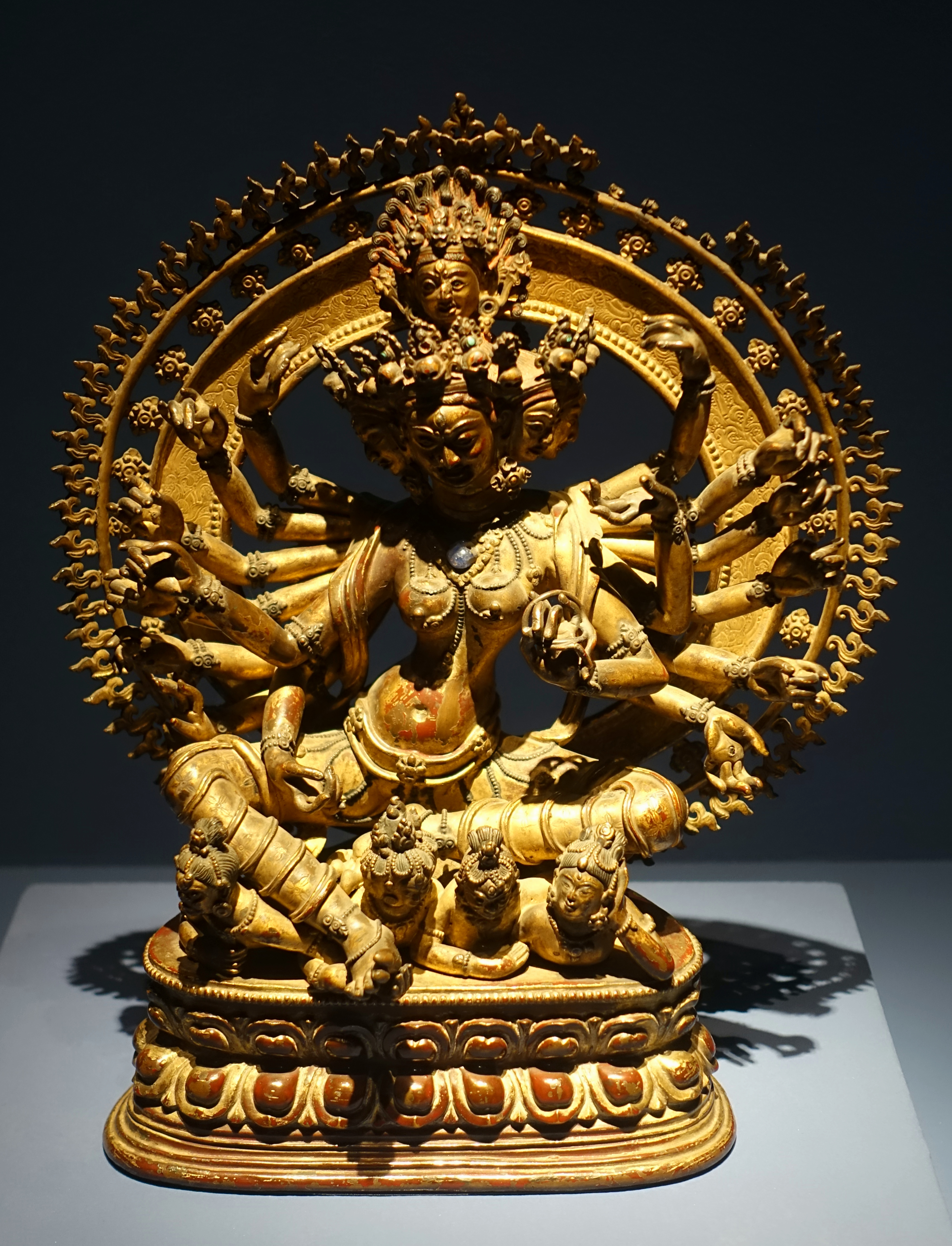
Prasanna Tārā, a fierce form of the goddess

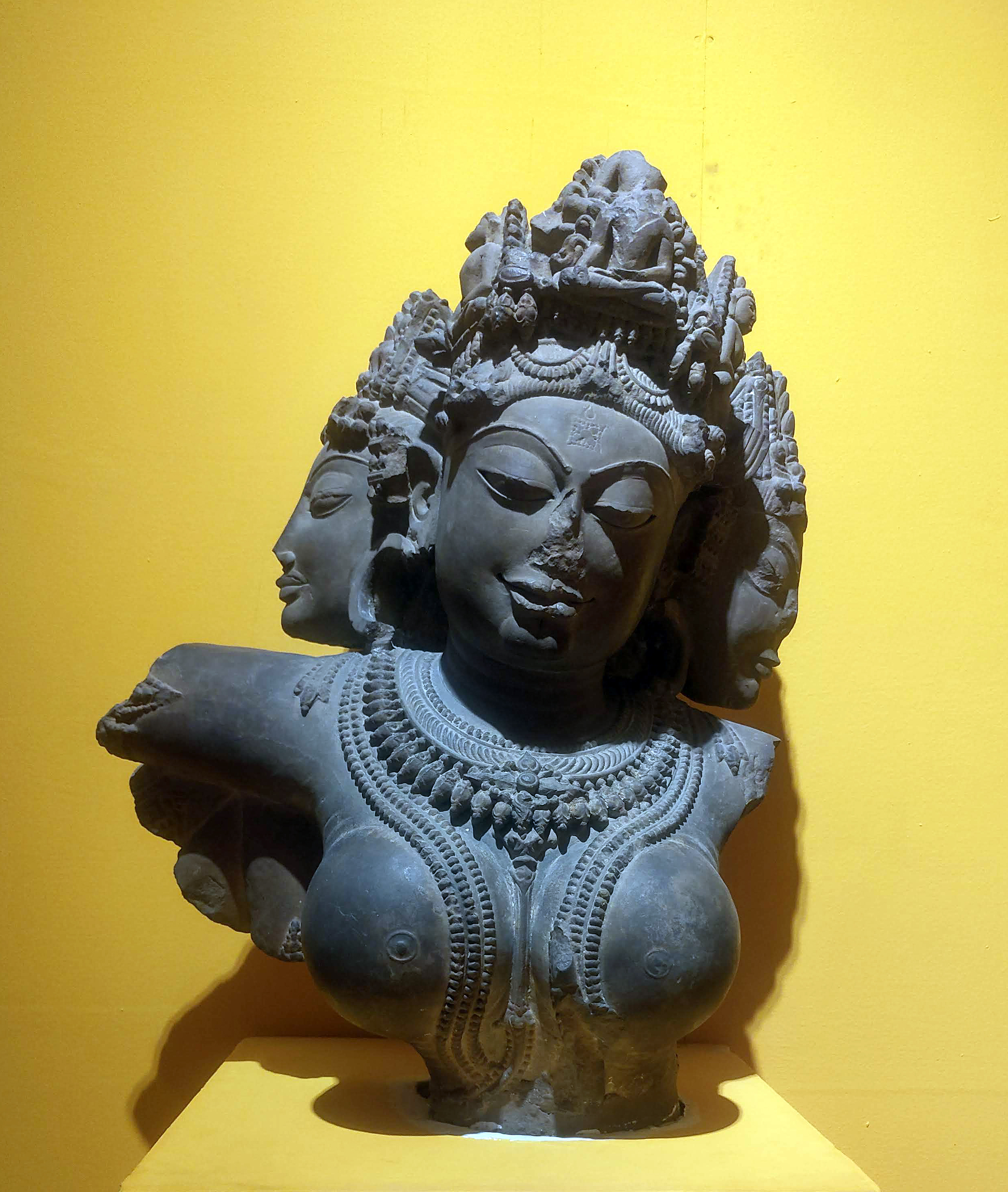
Bust of Vajratara

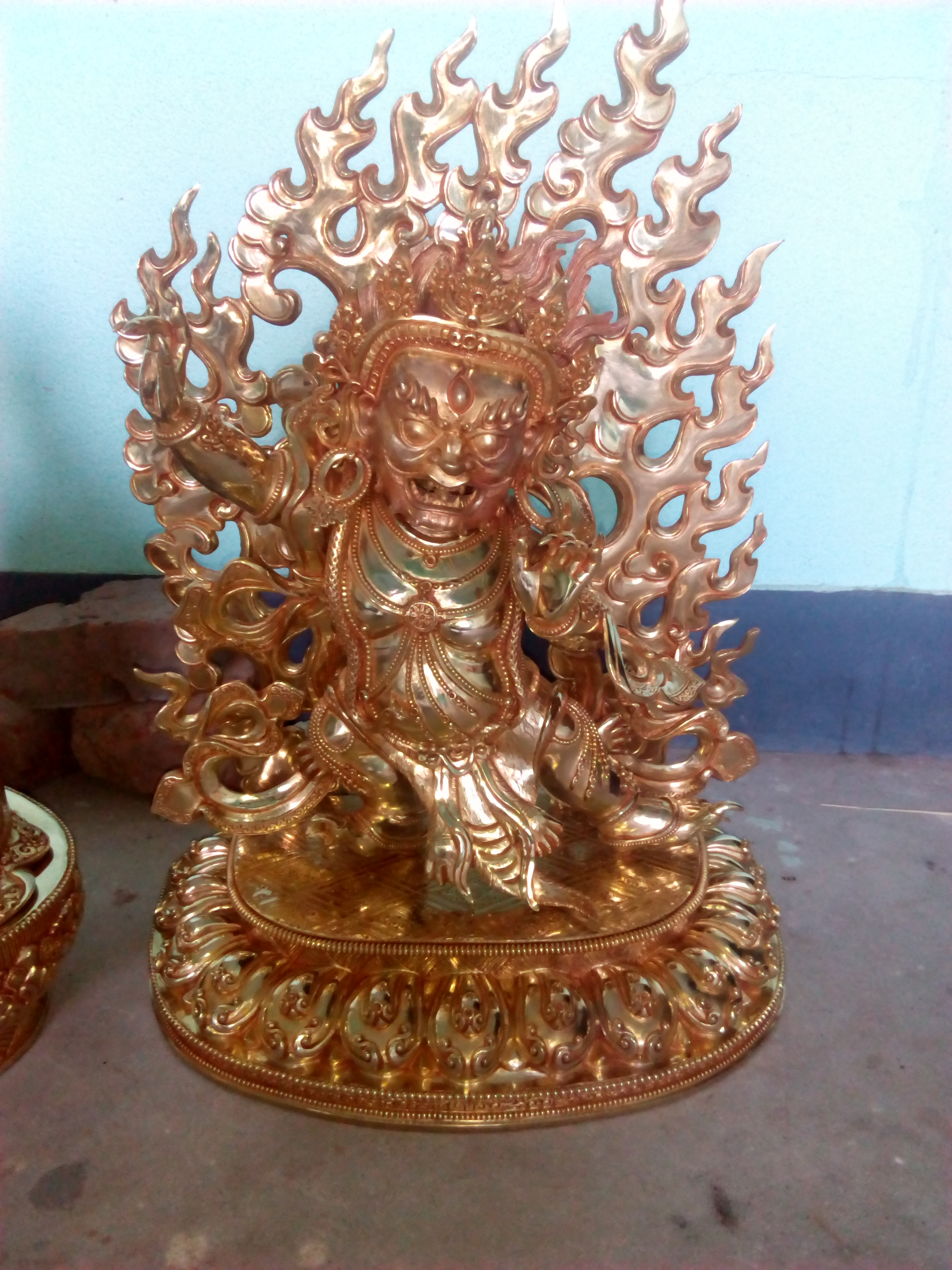
A statue from Nepal depicting a very fierce form of Tara

According to Shaw, there is a later trend of Tārā buddhology that began to see all other female divinities as aspects or emanations of Tārā or at least as being associated with her. Apart from her many emanations named Tārā of varying colors, other Mahayana female divinities that became associated with mother Tara include: Janguli, Parnashabari, Cunda, Kurukulla, Mahamayuri, Saraswati, Vasudhara, Usnisavijaya, and Marici. Based on the principle of Tārā as the central female Buddha, all other devis and dakinis were thus seen as emanations of her.

Other forms or emanations of Tārā include:

- Other wealth Taras like Yellow Cintamani Tārā ("Wish-Granting Gem Tara") and golden "Rajasri Tārā" holding a blue lotus.
- Vajra Tārā - a tantric form first described in the Vajrapanjara Tantra, who is yellow with eight arms, sometimes shown with a male consort.
- Cintāmaṇi Tārā, a form of Tārā widely practiced at the level of Highest Yoga Tantra in the Gelug School of Tibetan Buddhism, portrayed as green and often conflated with Green Tārā
- The Indic deity Sarasvati (Yangchenma), known for the arts, knowledge and wisdom, is sometimes seen as a form of Tārā
- Kurukullā (Rigjema), a red fierce Buddhist deity associated with magnetizing all good things is sometimes seen as an emanation of Tara
- Sitatapatra Tārā ("White Parasol" Tara), depicted as white with many arms, and is mainly seen as a protector
- Golden Prasanna Tārā – a wrathful form, with a necklace of bloody heads and sixteen arms holding an array of weapons and Tantric attributes.
- A yab-yum form in which Green Tara is depicted embracing the Buddha Amoghasiddhi.
- Pitishvari Uddiyana Tara - a red fierce dancing Tara with four faces and eight arms, a crown of skulls, a necklace of fresh heads and depicted as surrounded by fire.
- Yeshe Tsogyal ("Wisdom Lake Queen"), the consort of Padmasambhava who brought Buddhism to Tibet, is seen as an emanation of Tārā in Tibetan Buddhism.
- Rigjay Lhamo, "Goddess Who Brings Forth Awareness", seated in royal posture surrounded by rainbow light.

Tārā's iconography such as the lotus also shows resemblance with the Hindu goddess Lakshmi, and at least one Tibetan liturgy evokes Lakshmi as Tārā.

== Gallery ==
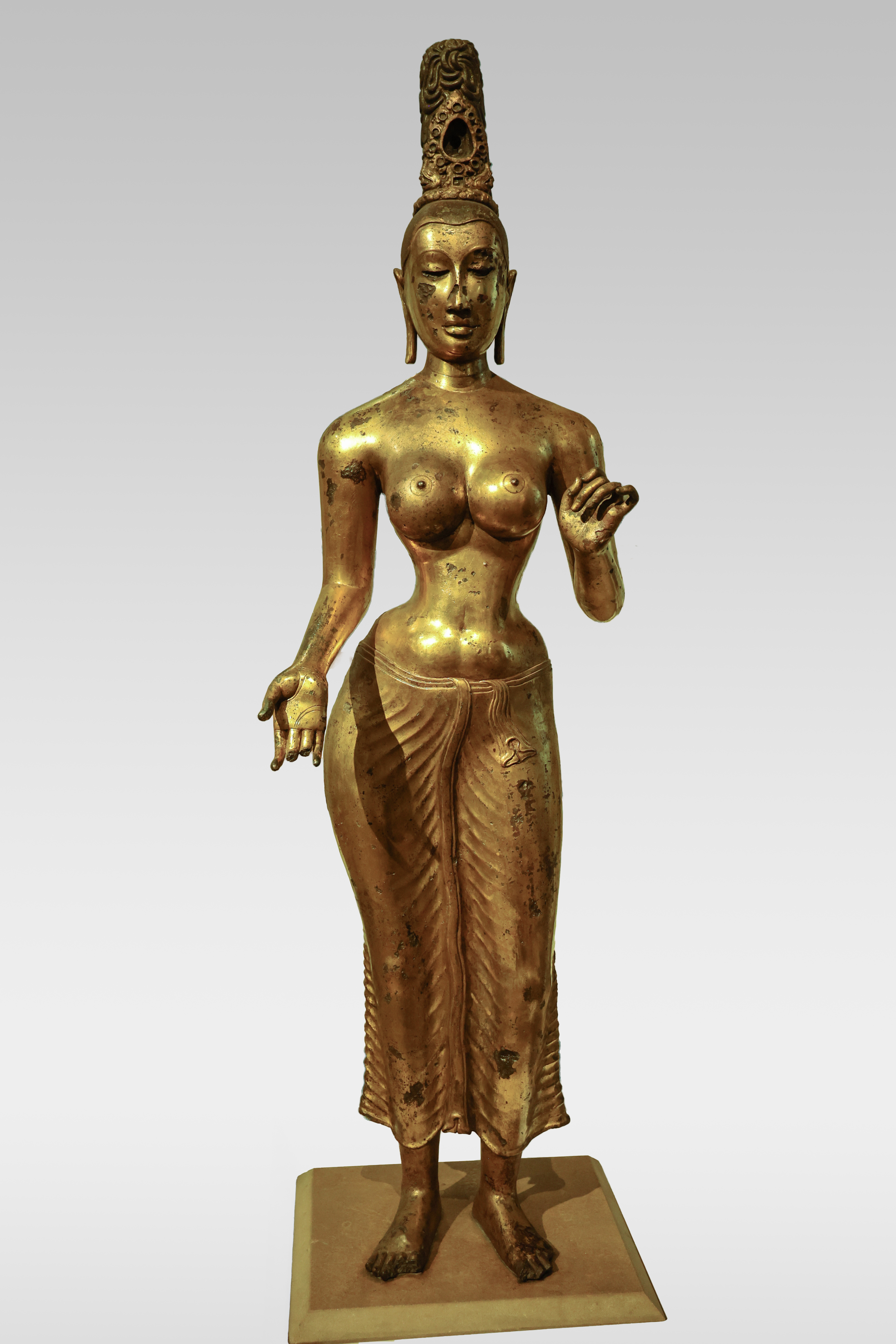
Bronze statue at the British Museum

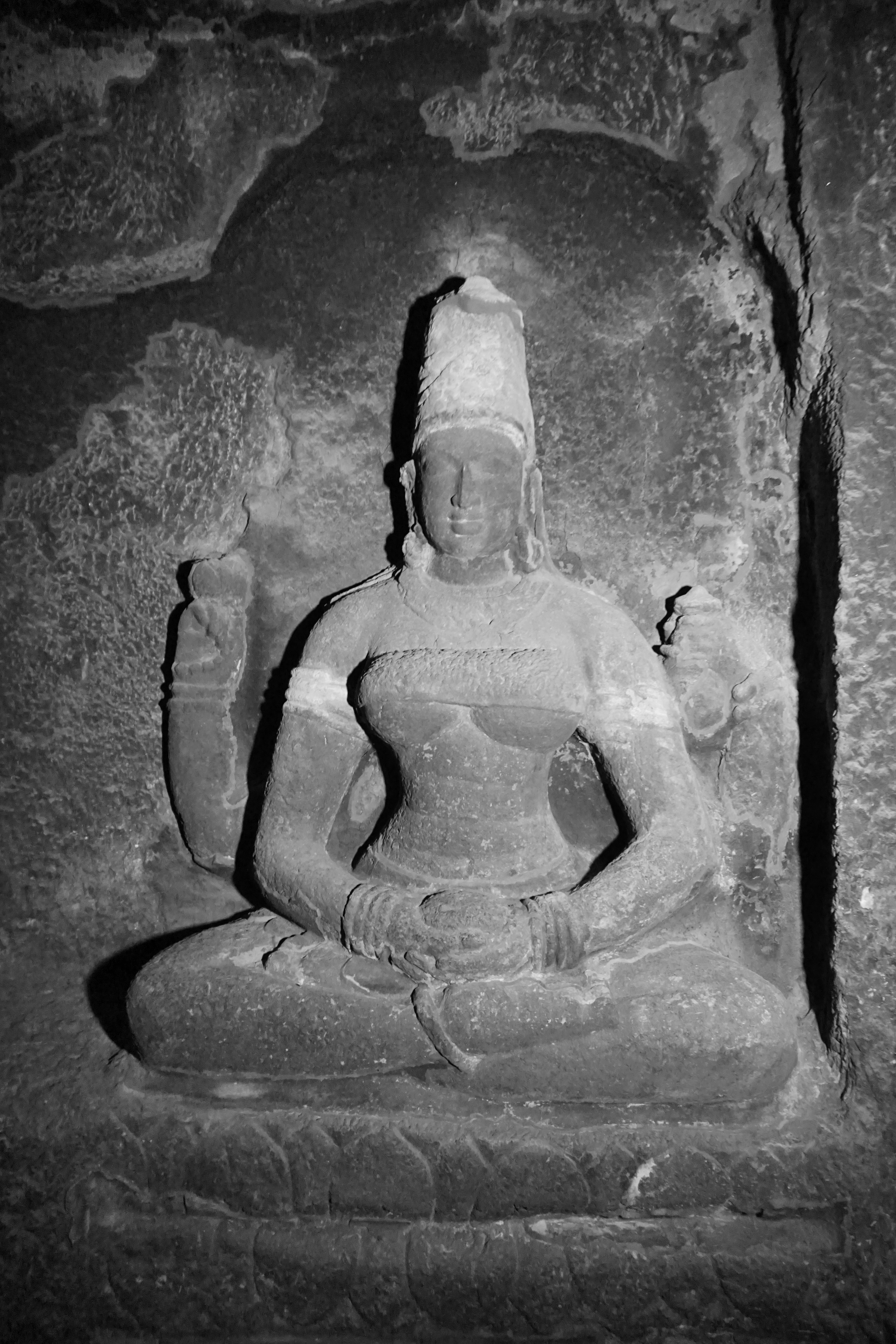
Tara at Ellora Cave 12

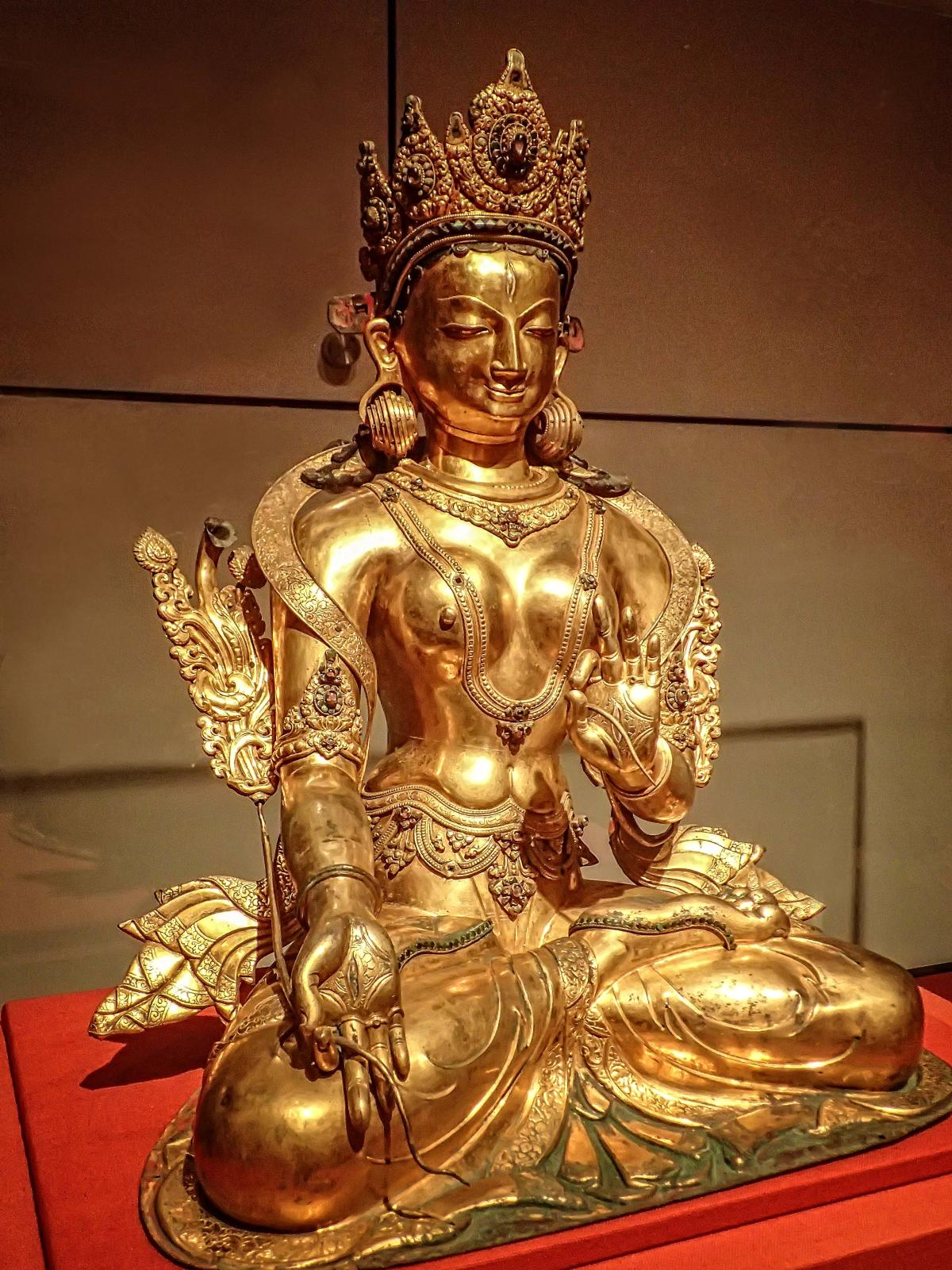
Gilded copper White Tara, Nepal

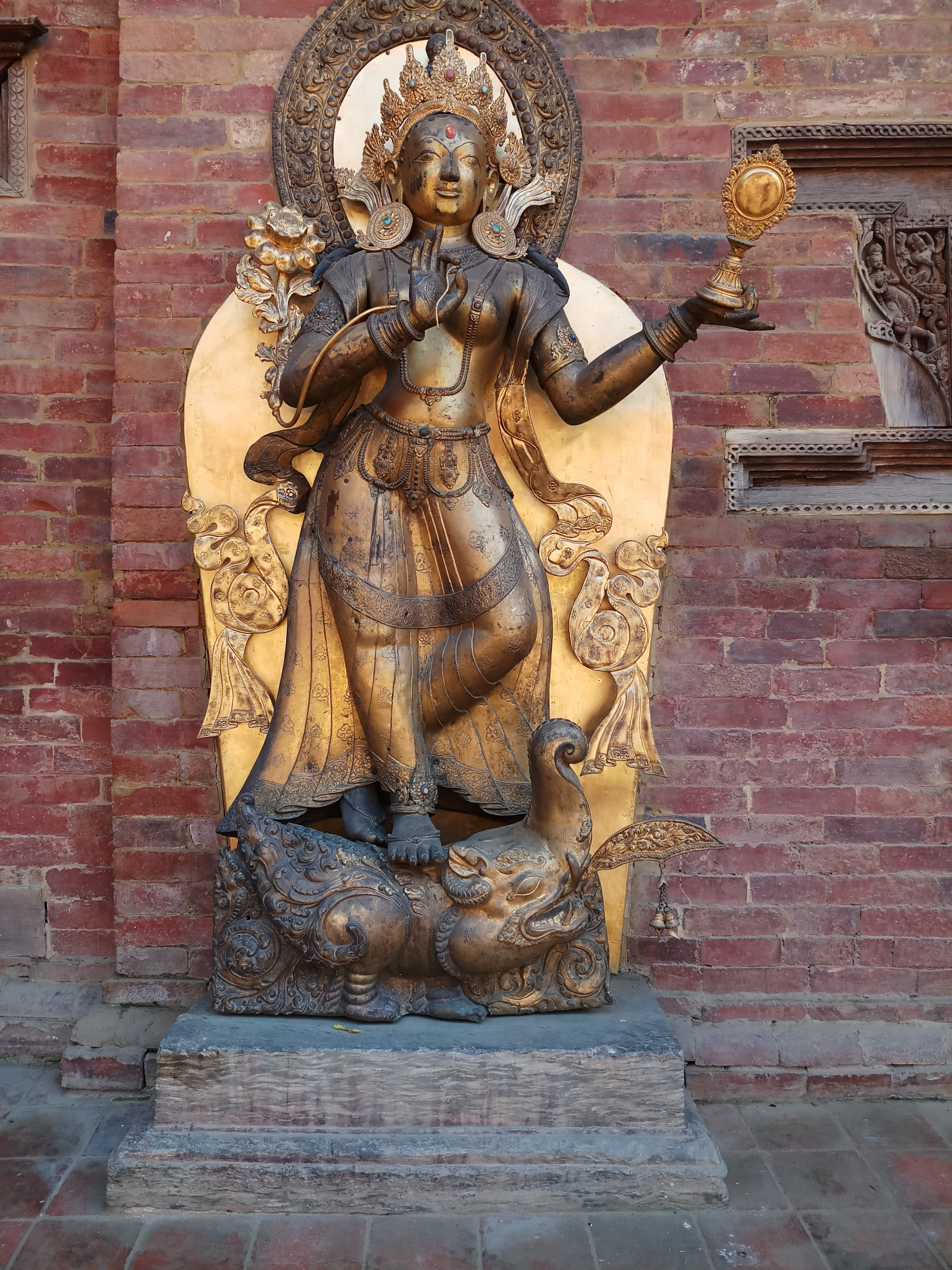
Tara statue, Patan

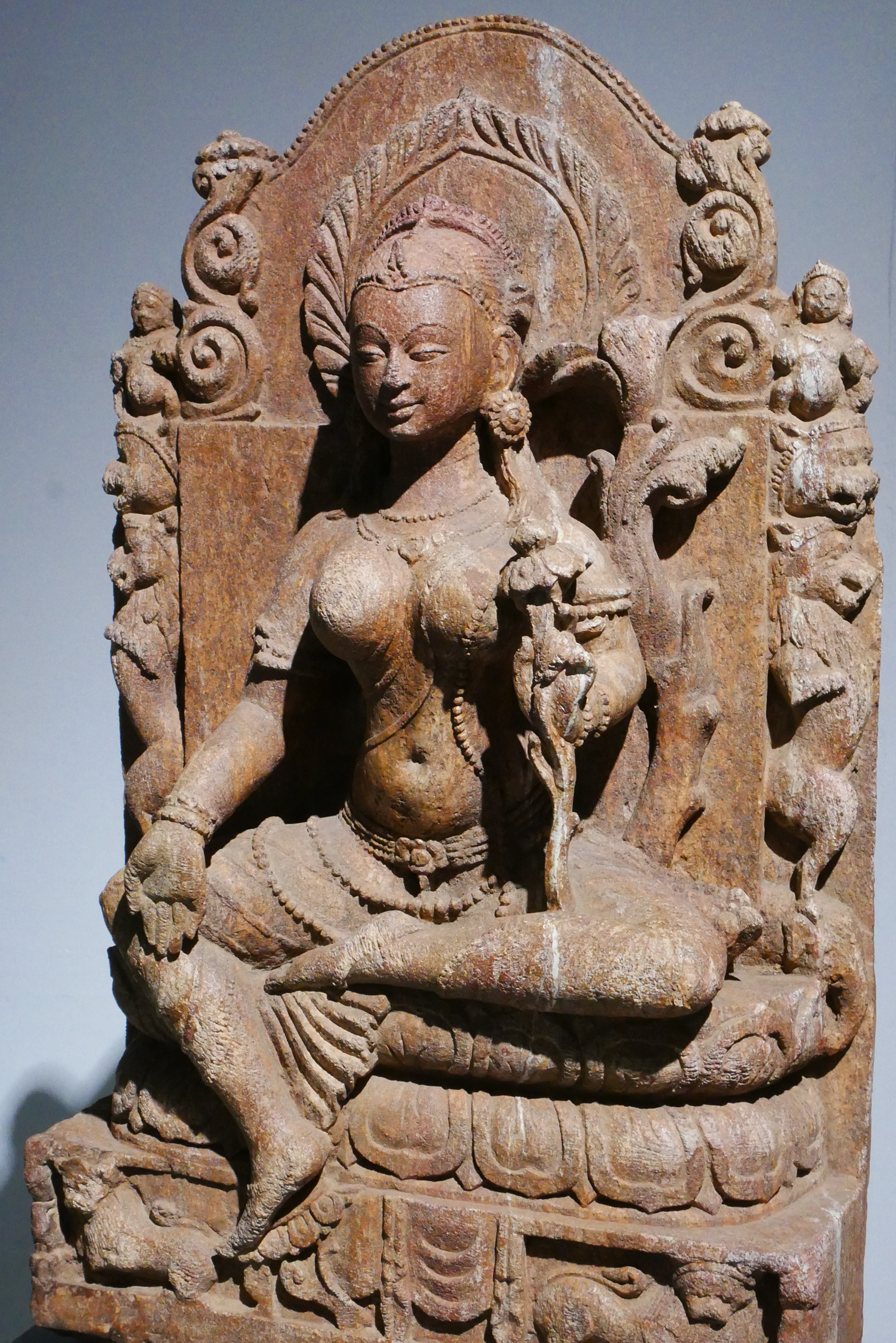
Sandstone Tara Statue

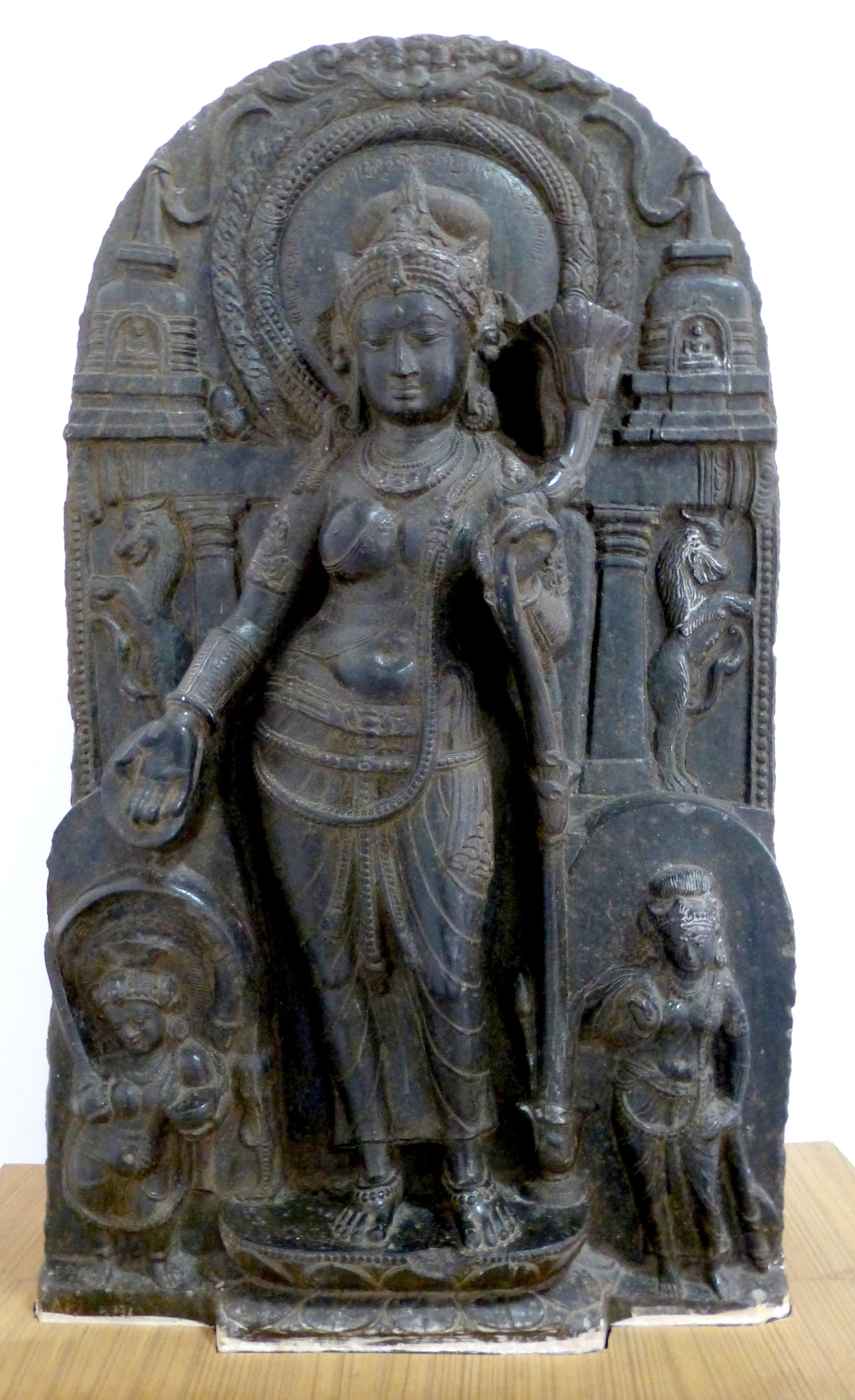
Tara c. 10–11 century, Gaya

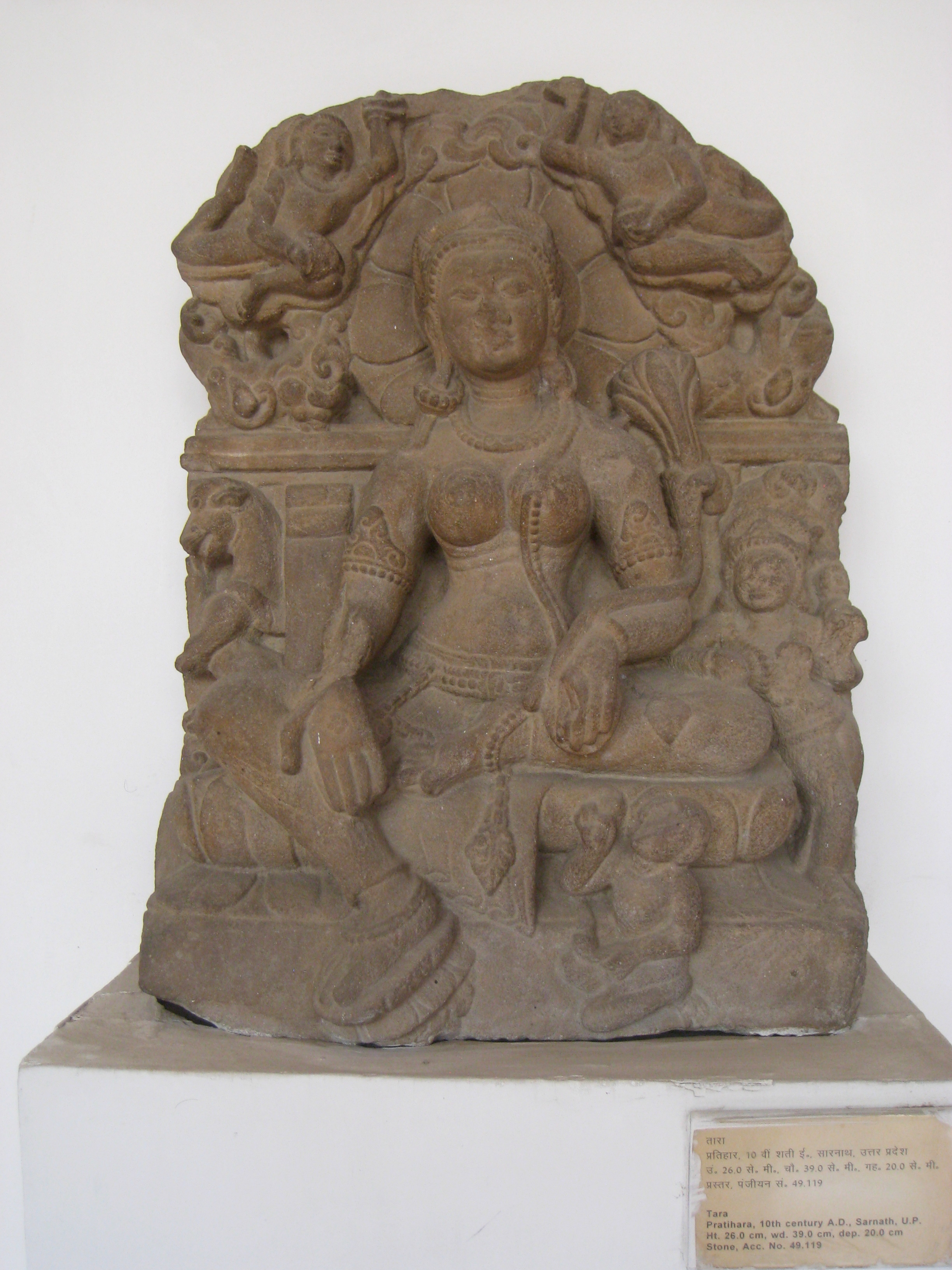
Tara, Sarnath

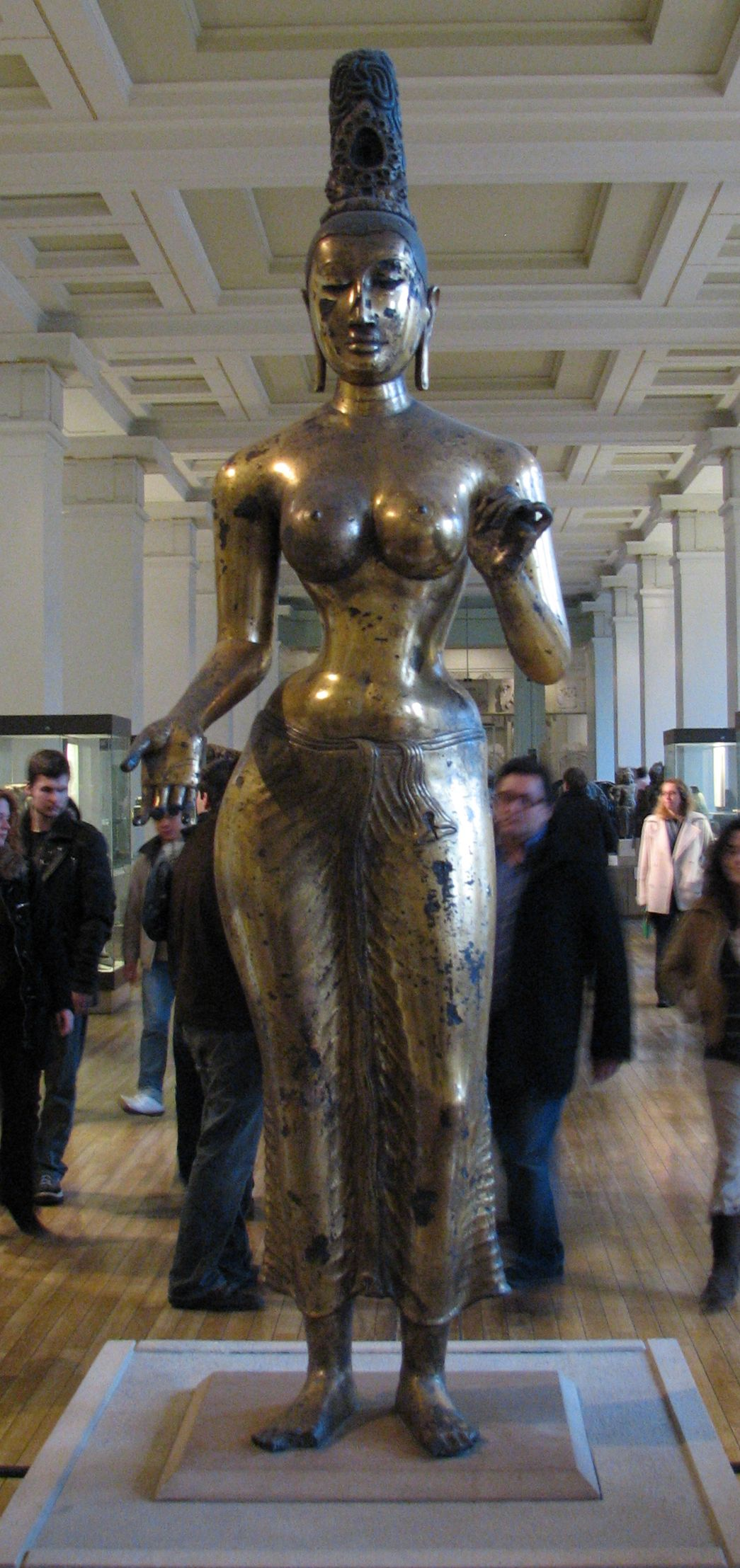
Statue of Tara, Sri Lanka, 7th–8th century

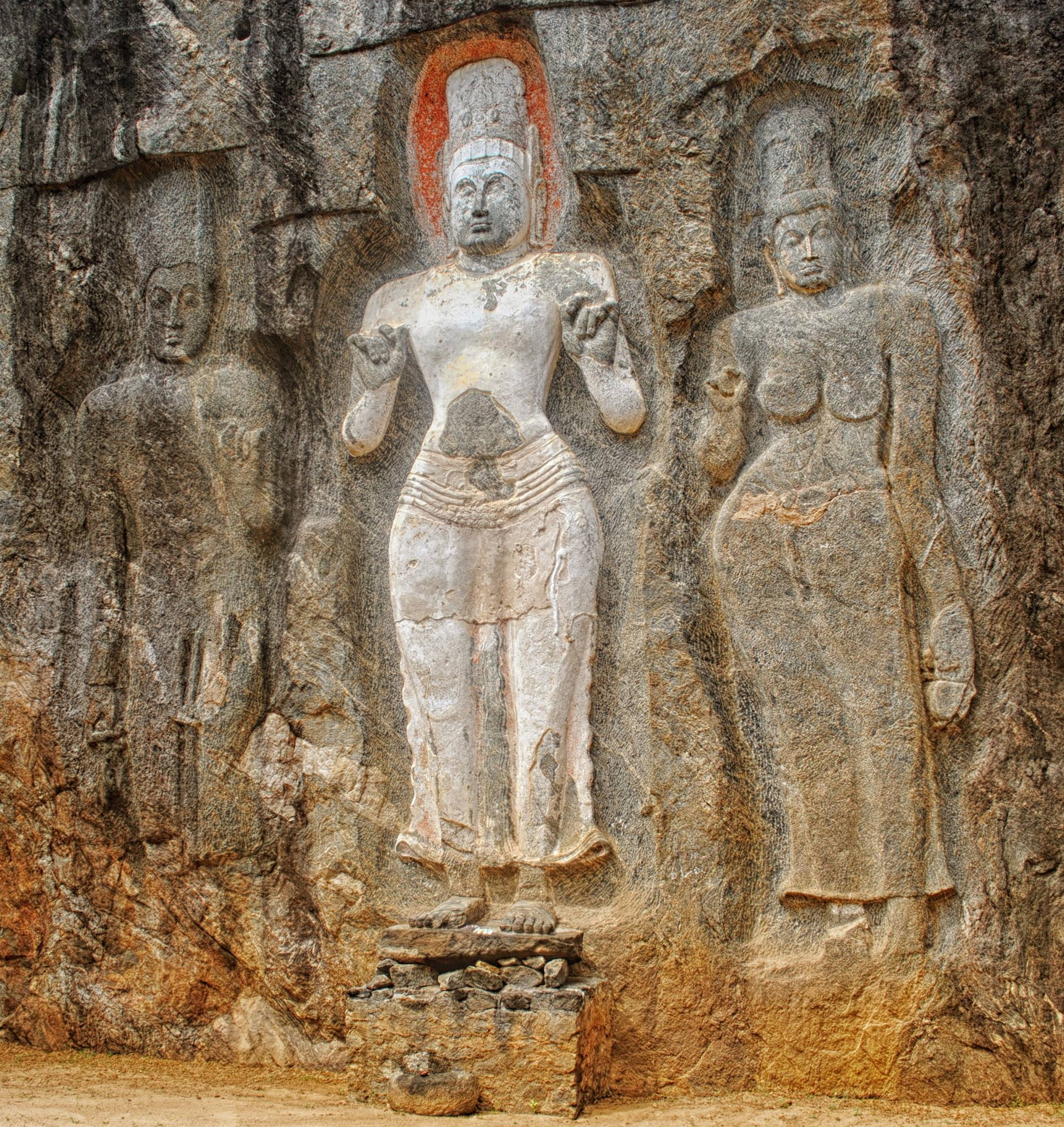
Tara and Avalokitesvara, Buduruwagala, Sri Lanka

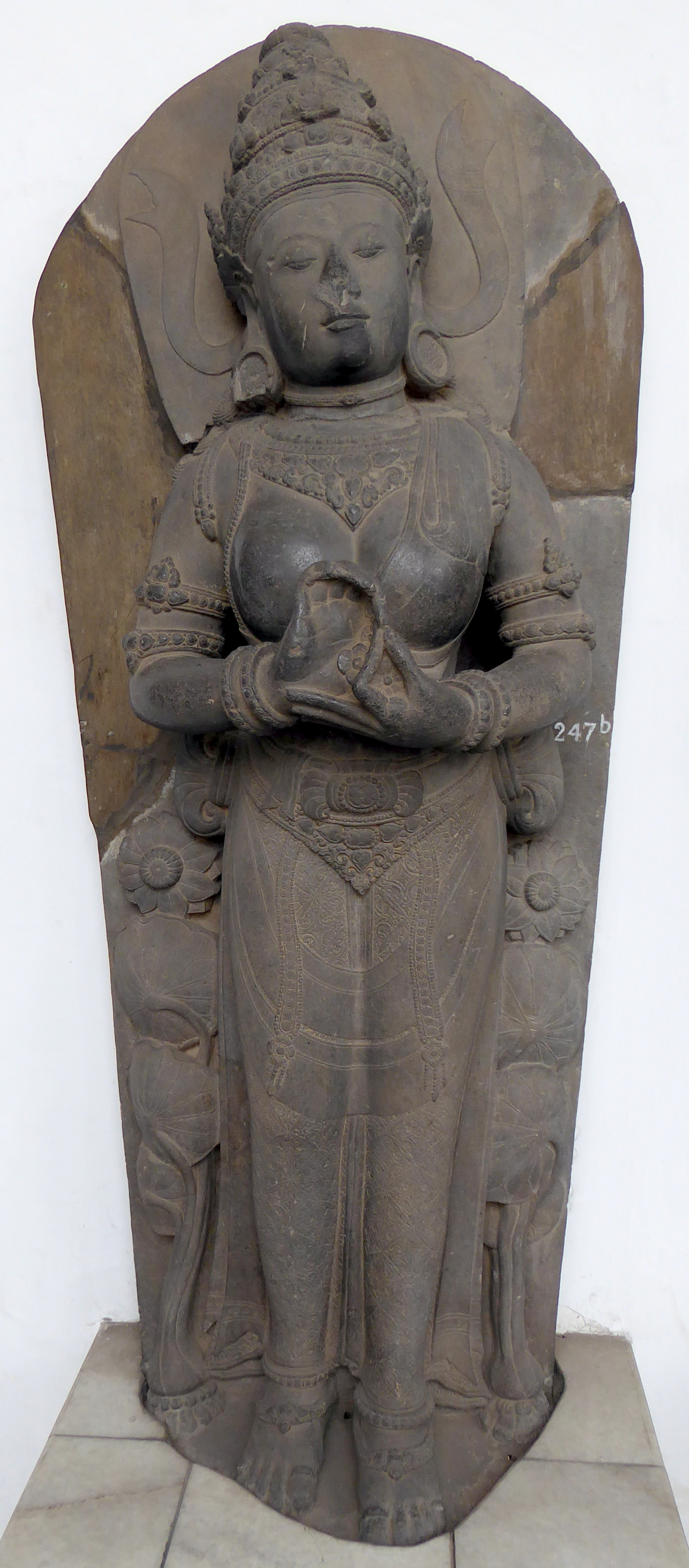
Syamatara, Candi Jago, Malang, East Java, 13th c.

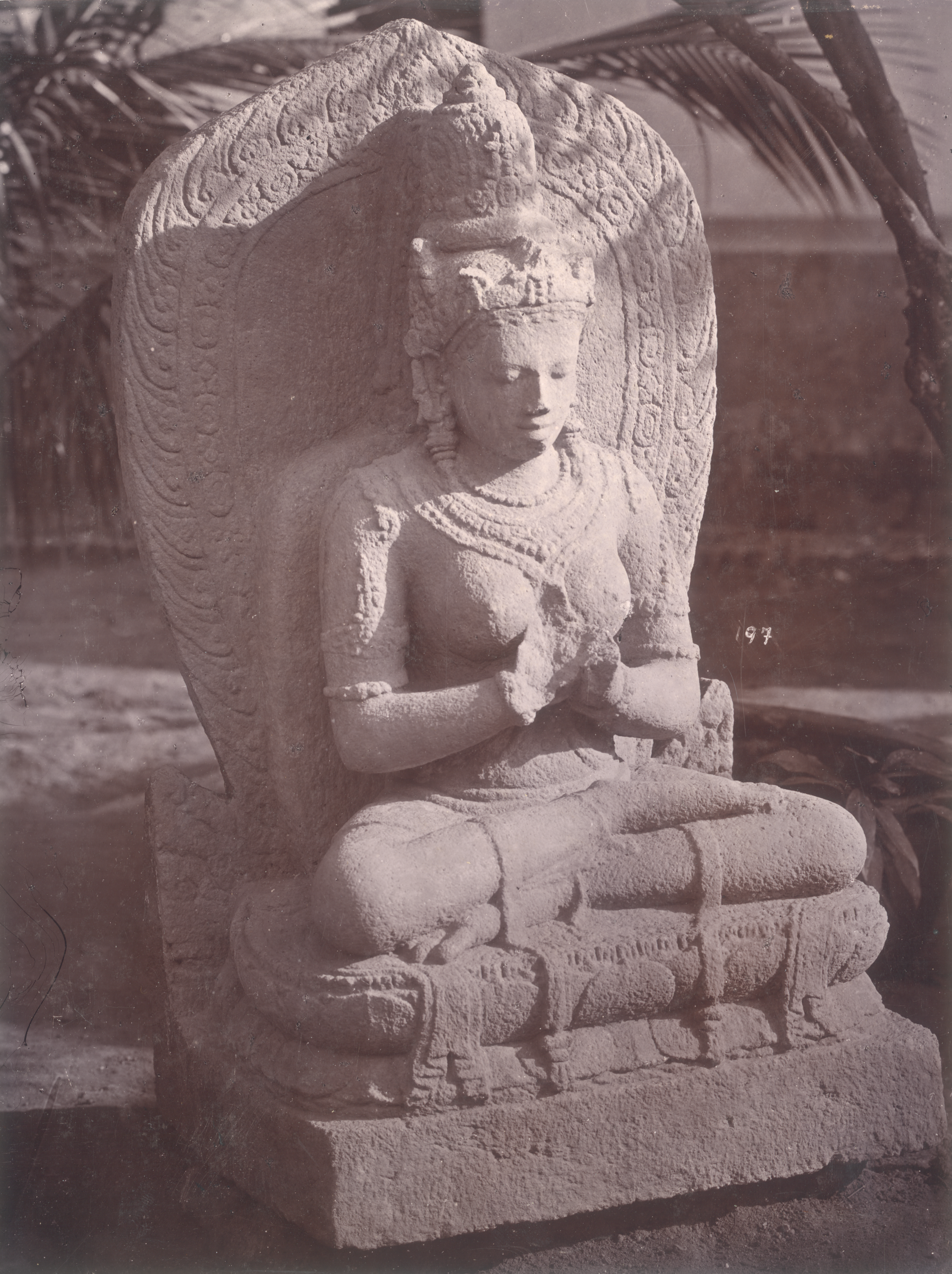
Sculpture of Tara in a museum in Yogyakarta

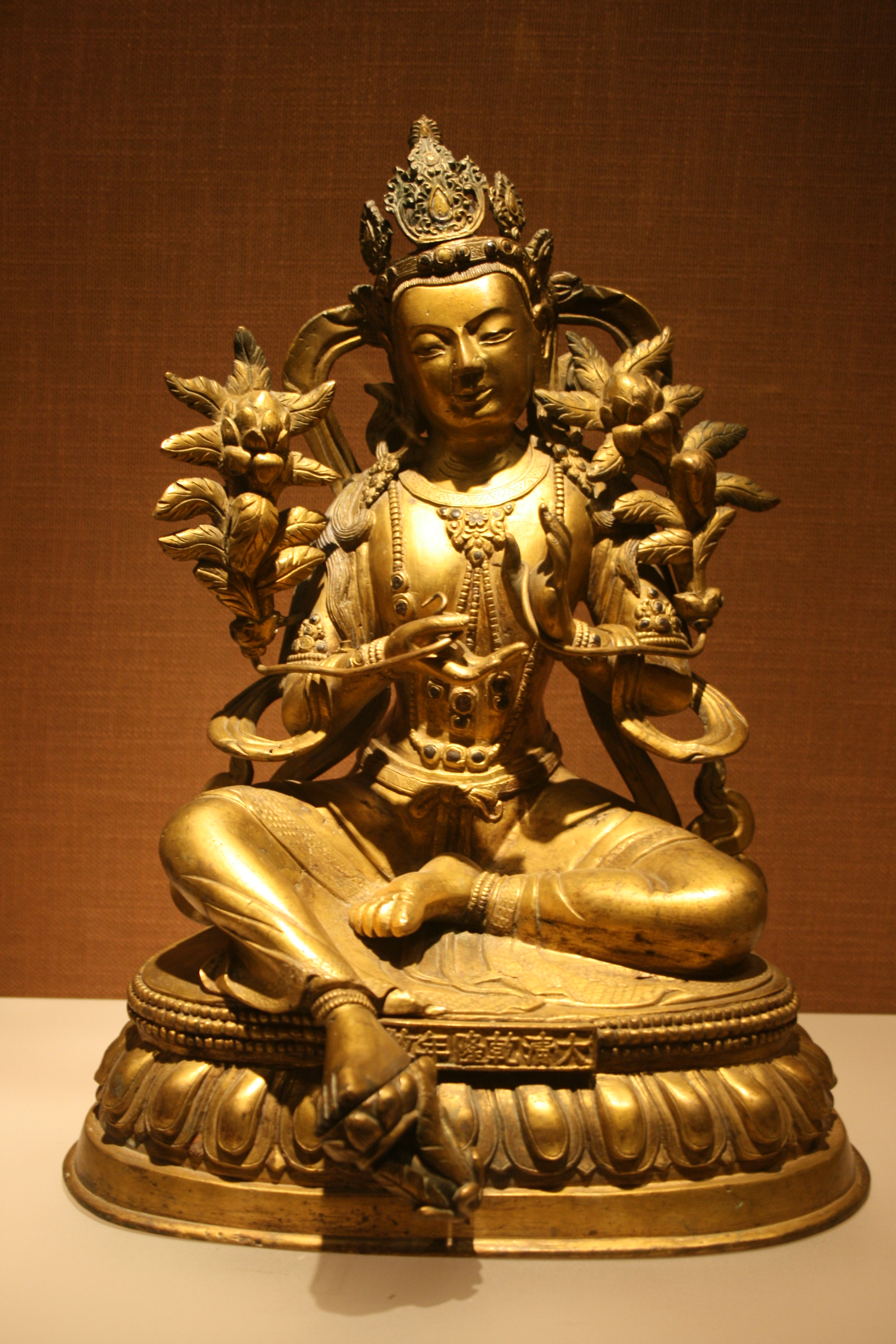
Green Tara statue, Qing dynasty

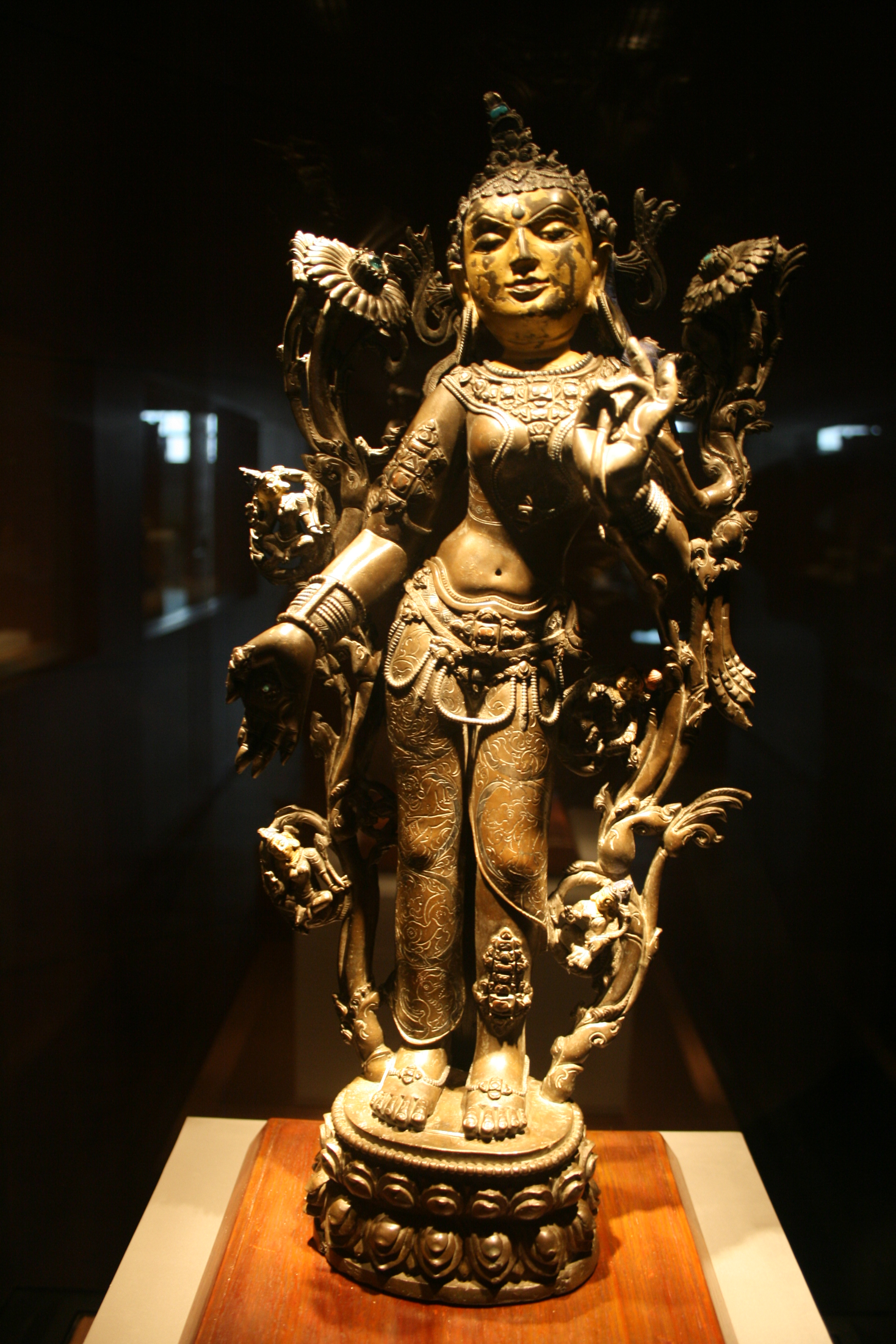
Tara statue from the Qing dynasty

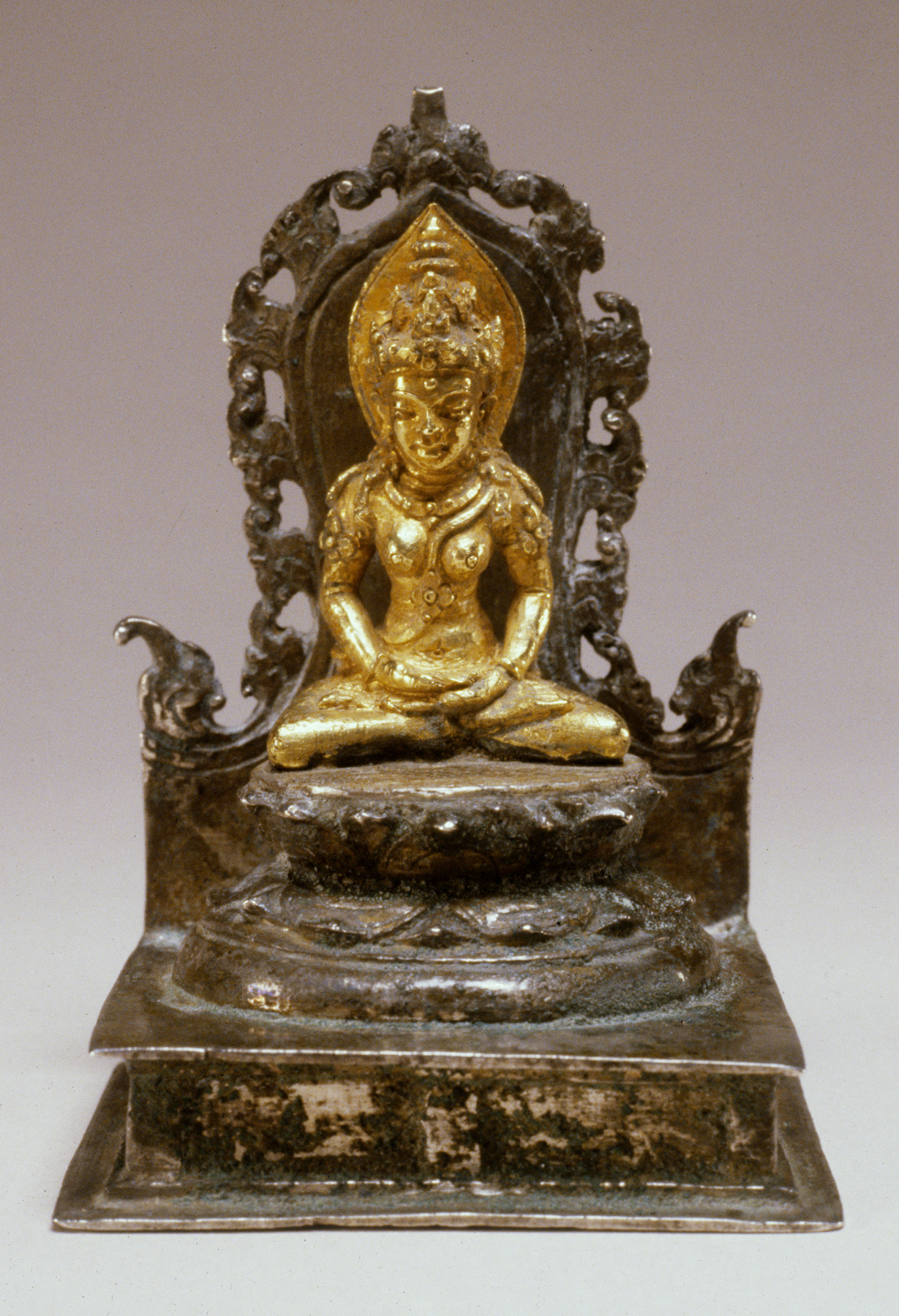
The Buddhist Goddess Tara, gold and silver, Central Java, Indonesia, c. 9th century.

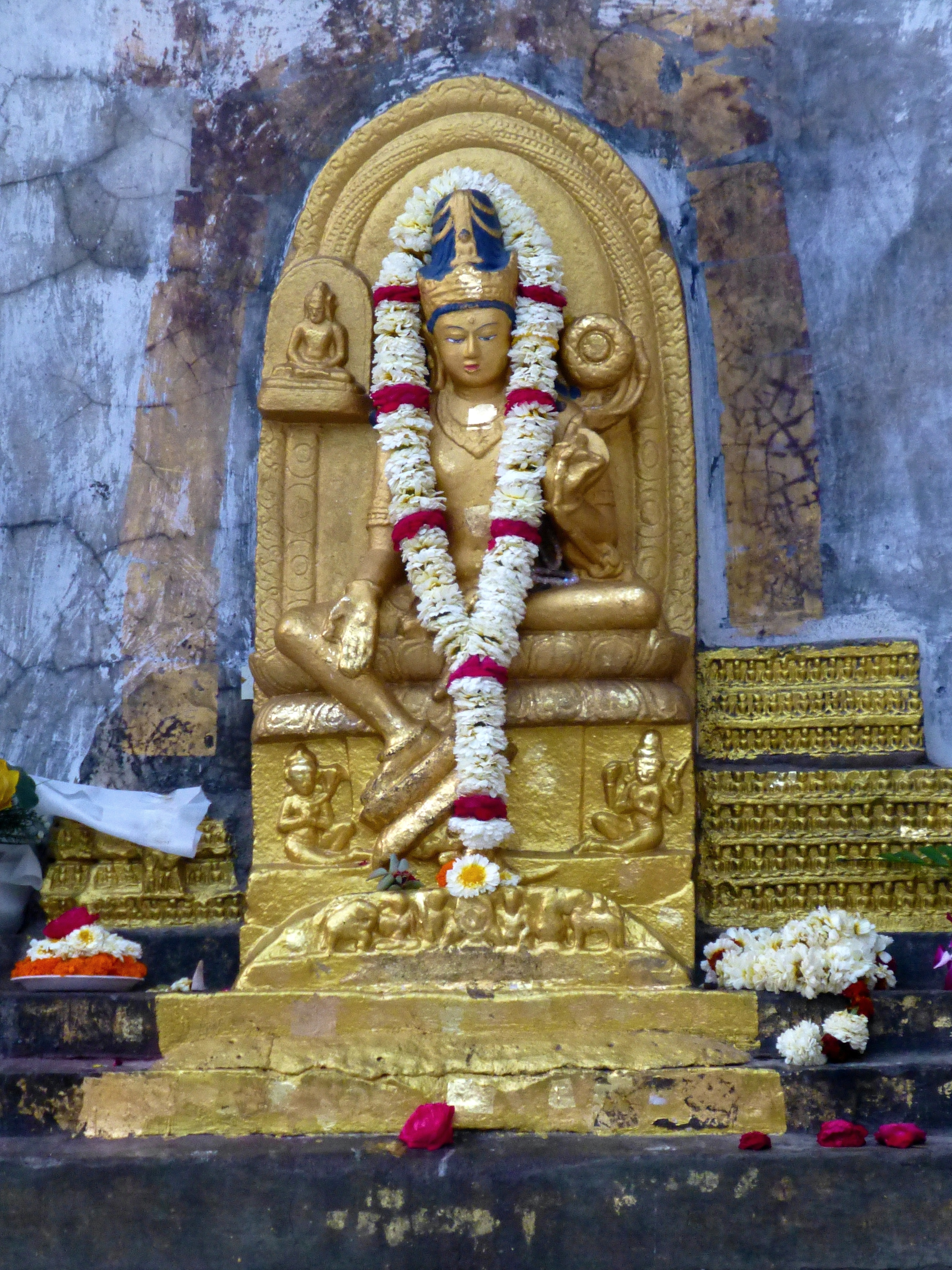
Tara, Mahabodhi Temple, Bodhgaya

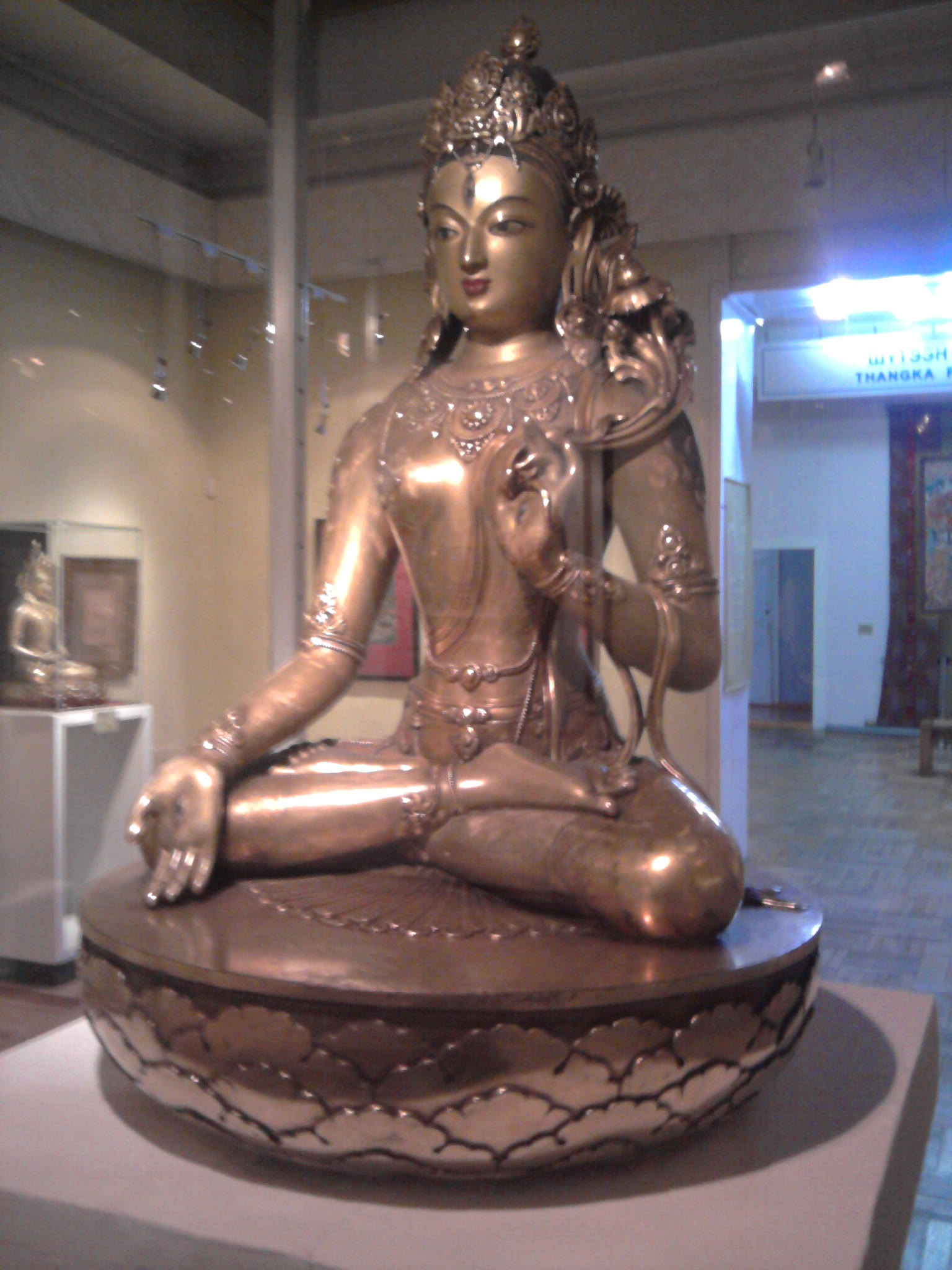
Sita (White) Tara by Öndör Gegeen Zanabazar. Mongolia, c. 17th century.

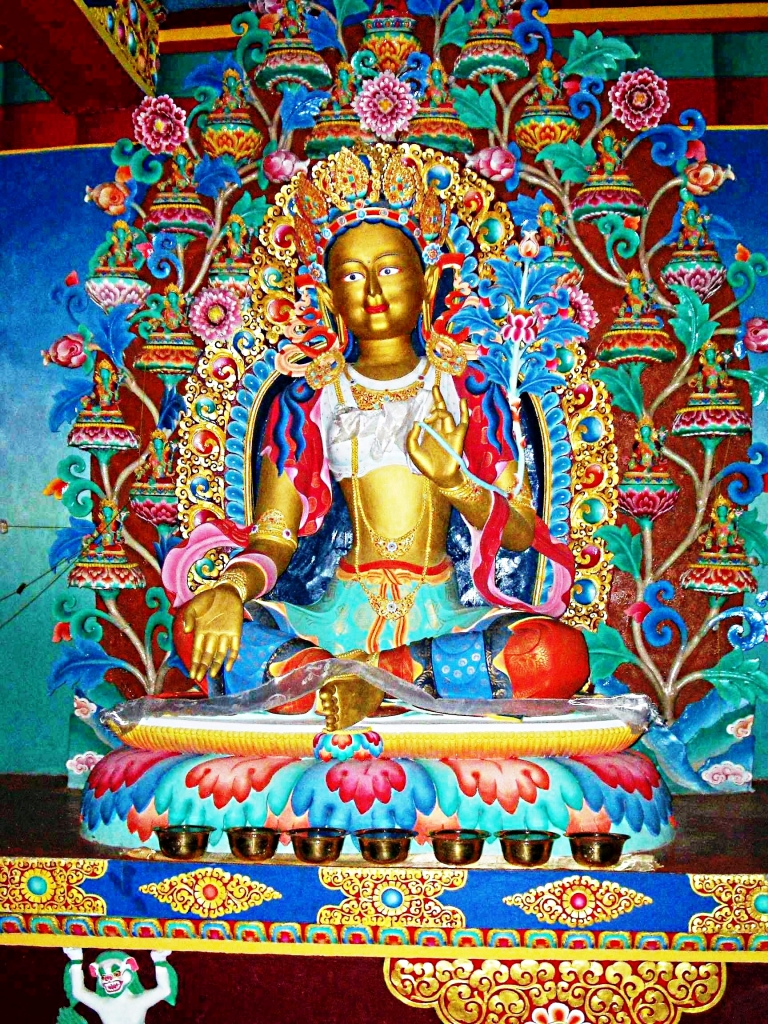
Tara statue near Kullu, Himachal Pradesh, India

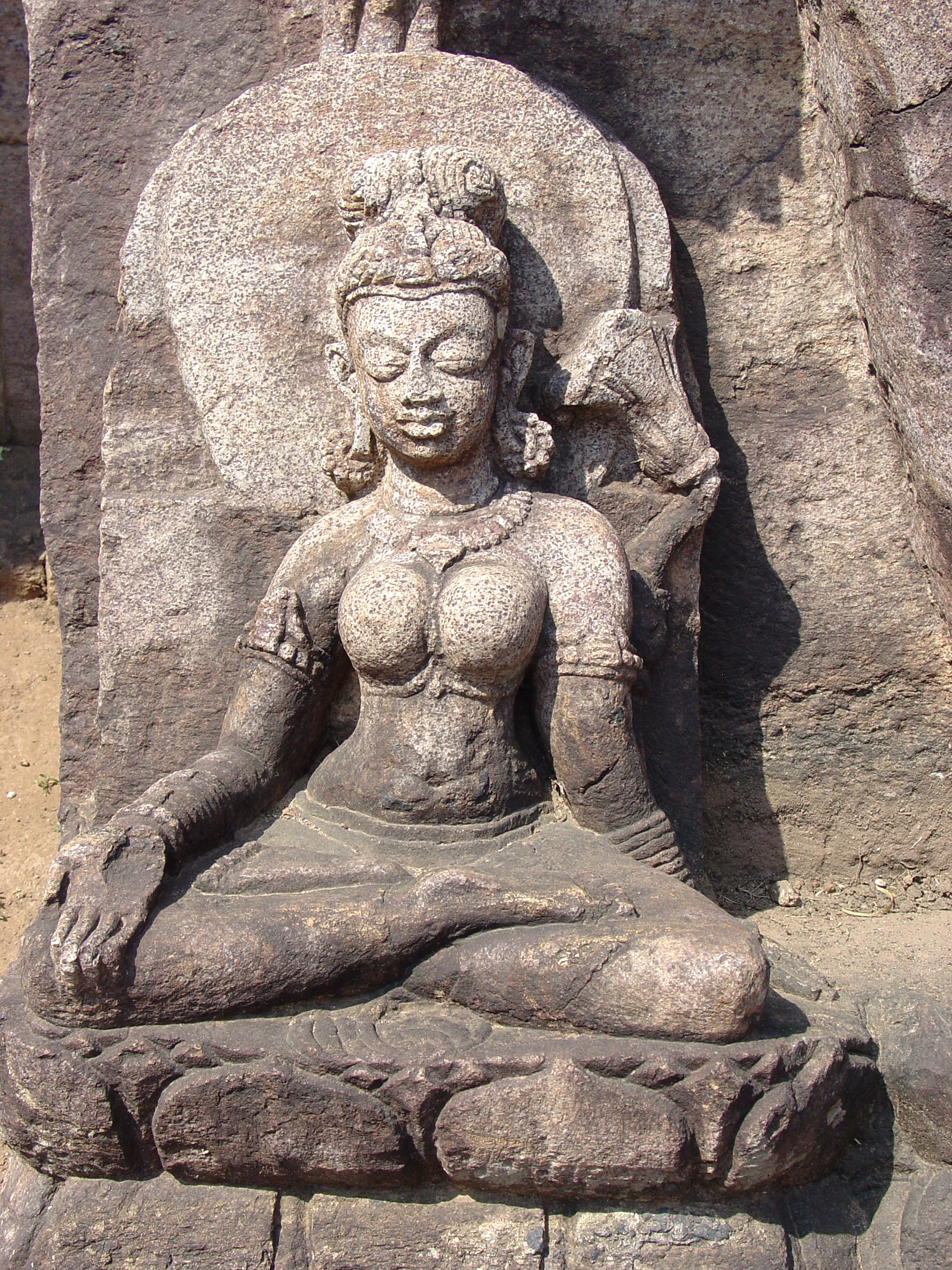
Medititating Tara, Ratnagiri, Odisha, India, 8th century

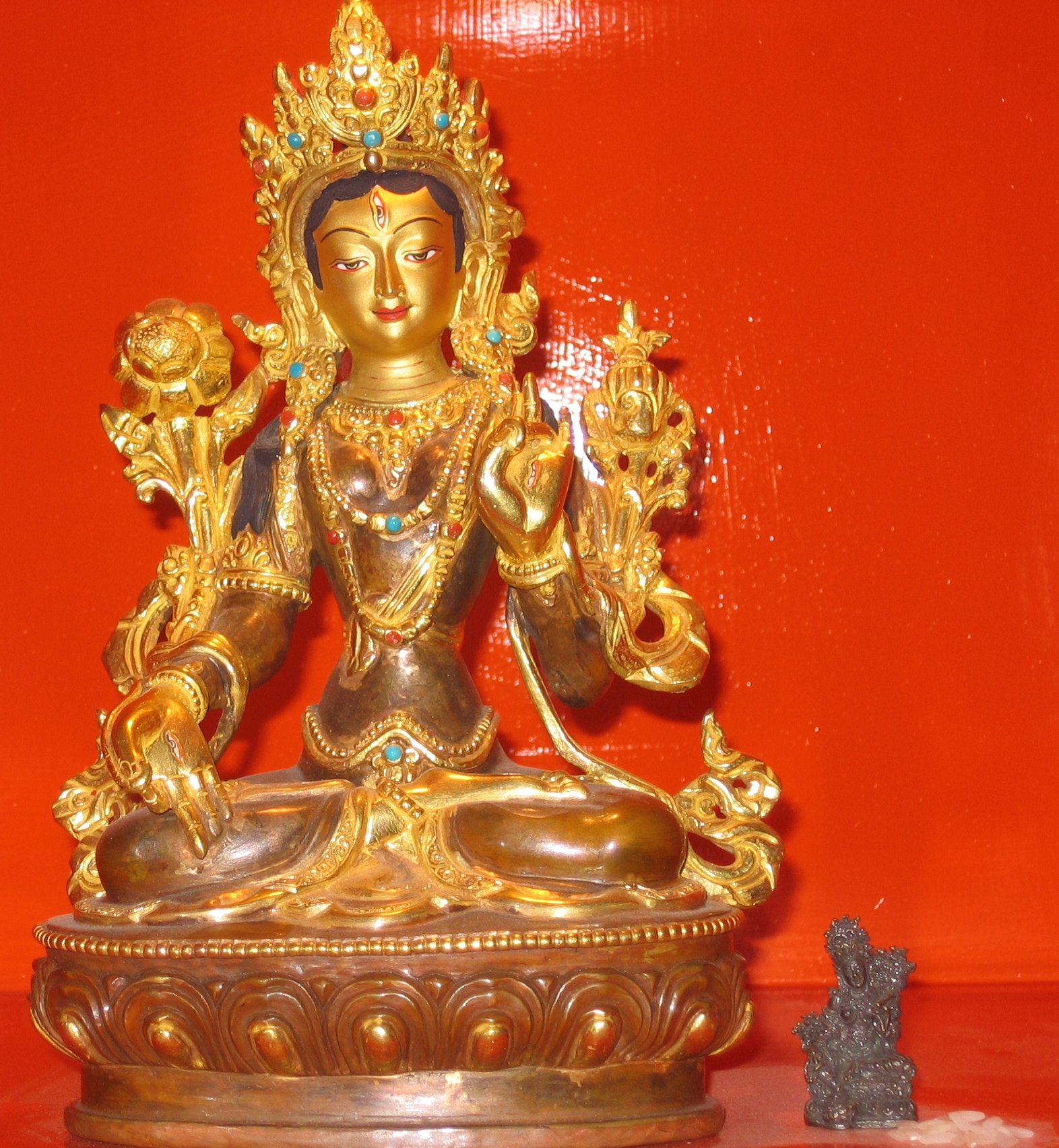
White Tara statue in a Karma Kagyu dharma centre

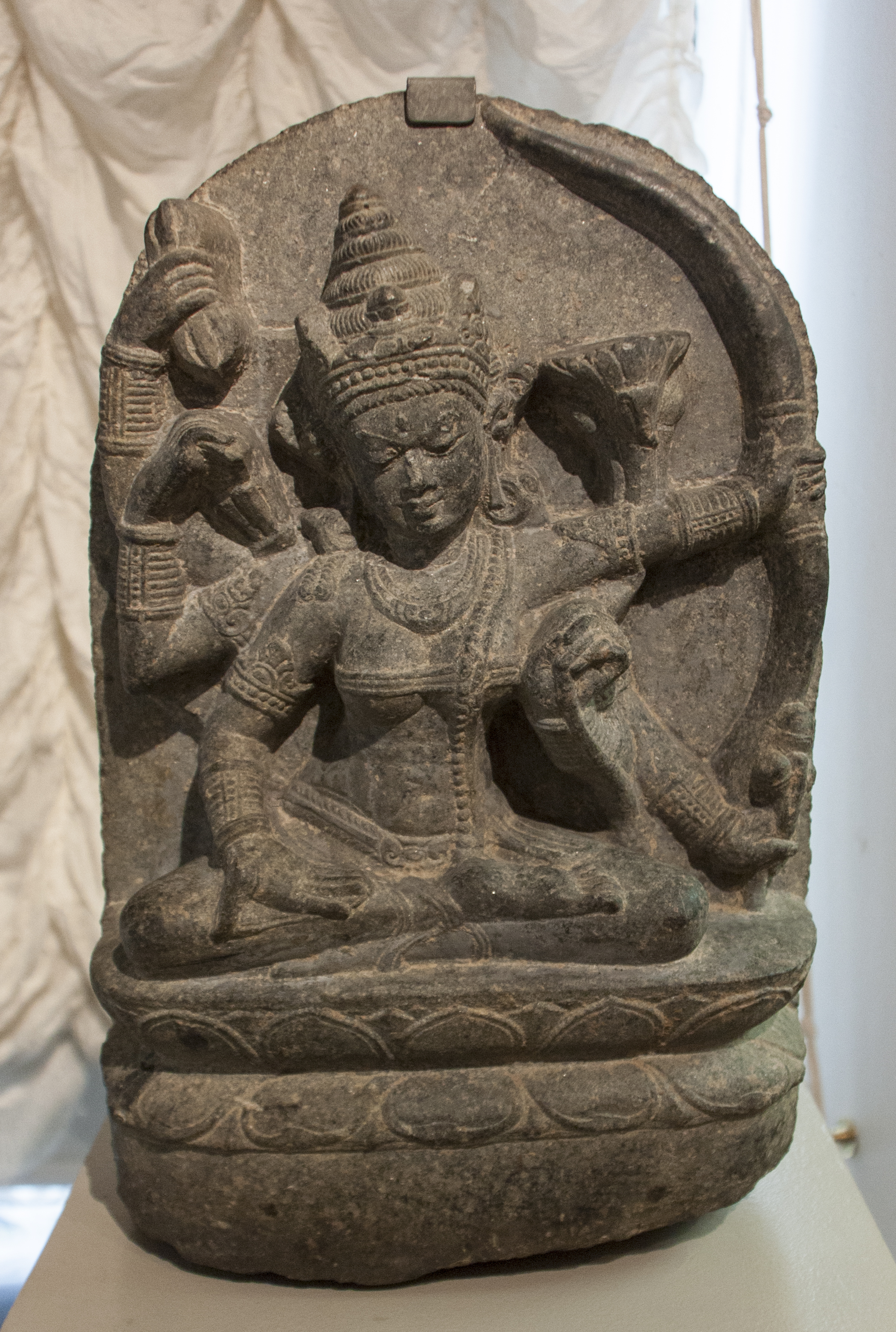
Late Pala era Tara, c. 10th–11th centuries

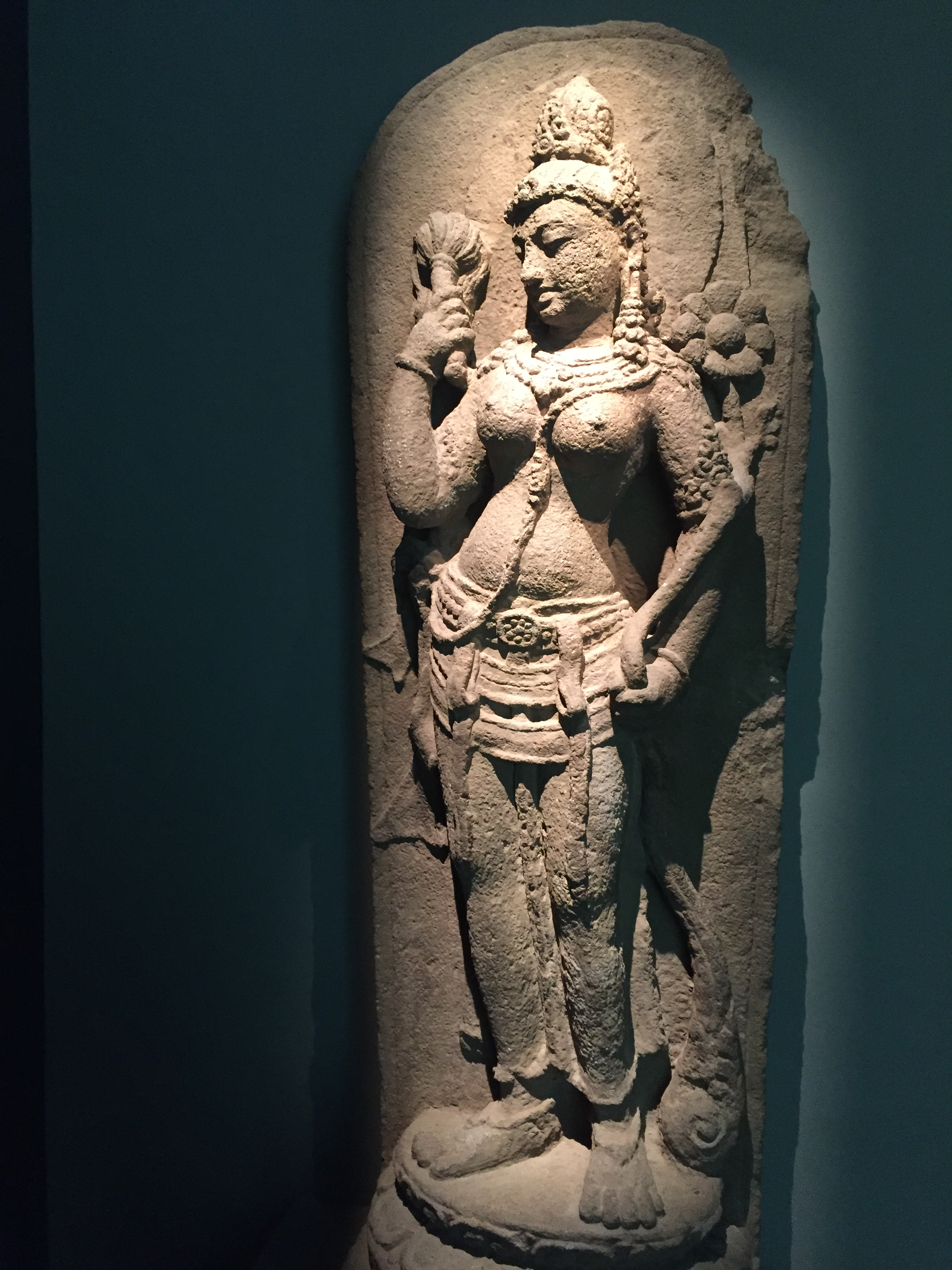
Syamatara (Green Tārā), 9th century Javanese Shailendran art, from Central Java, Indonesia

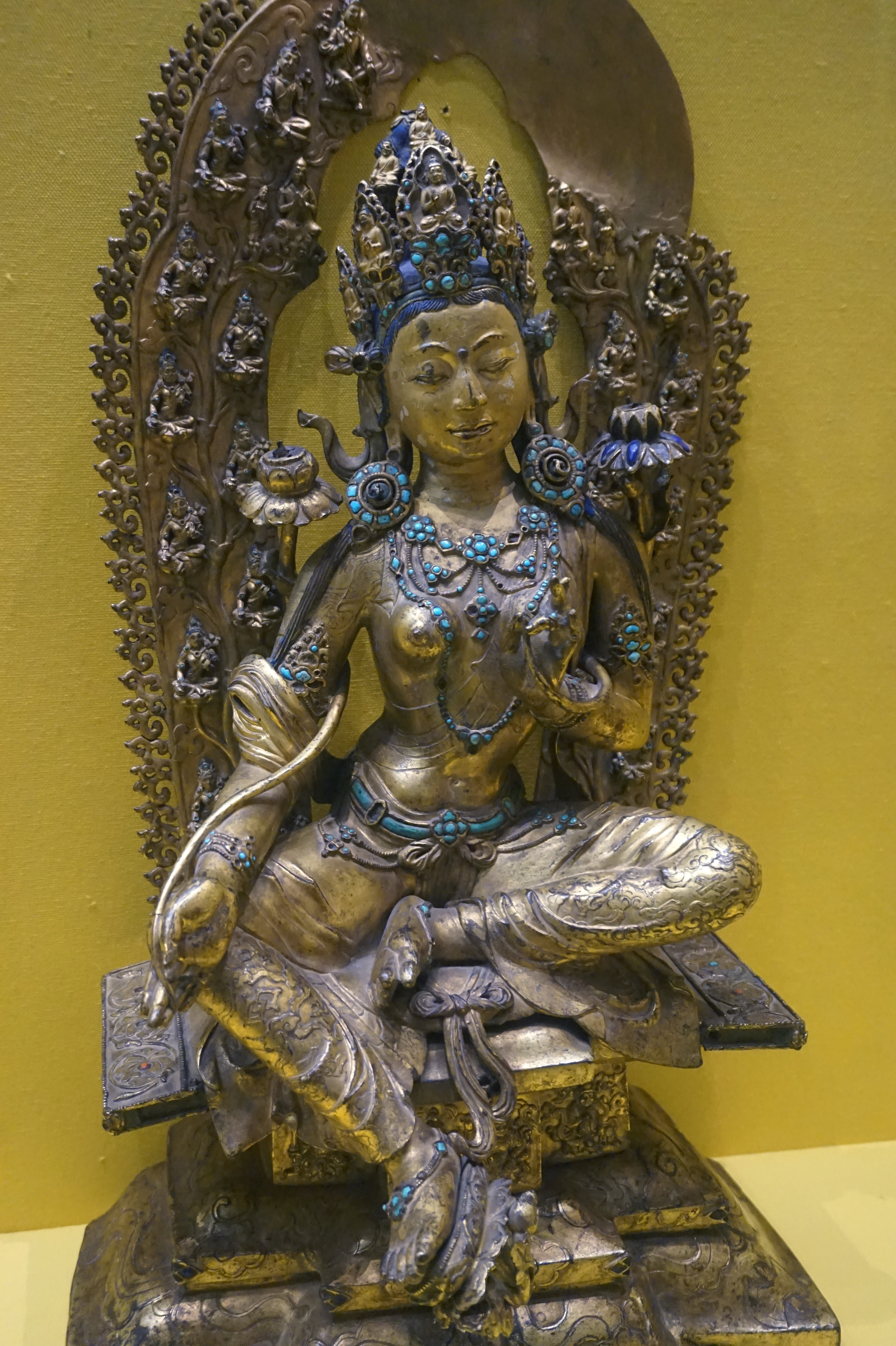
Green Tara c. 15th–16th century, copper with gilding, painted with clay and gold, held in the Tibet Museum.

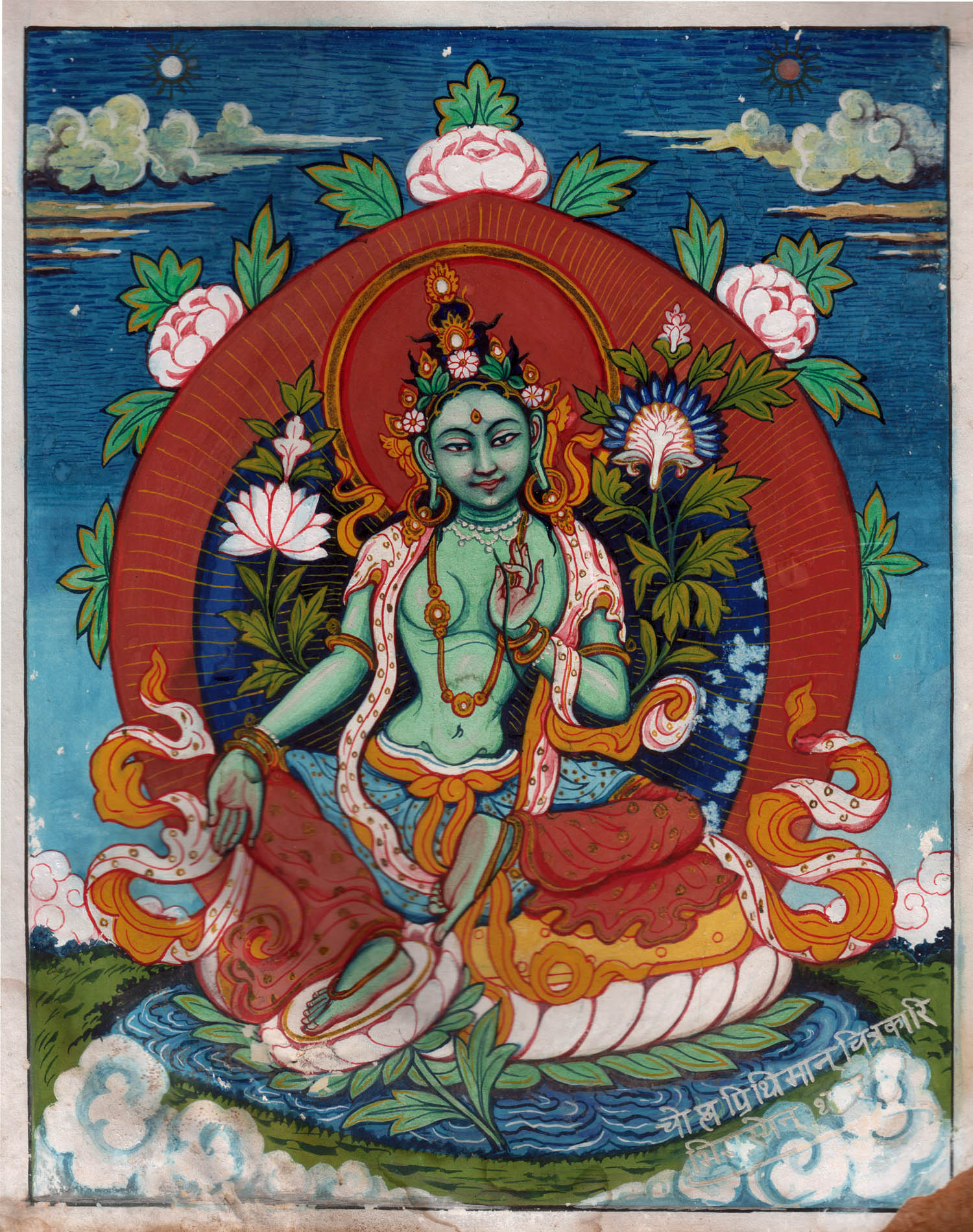
Painting of Buddhist goddess Green Tara by Prithvi Man Chitrakari done in 1947

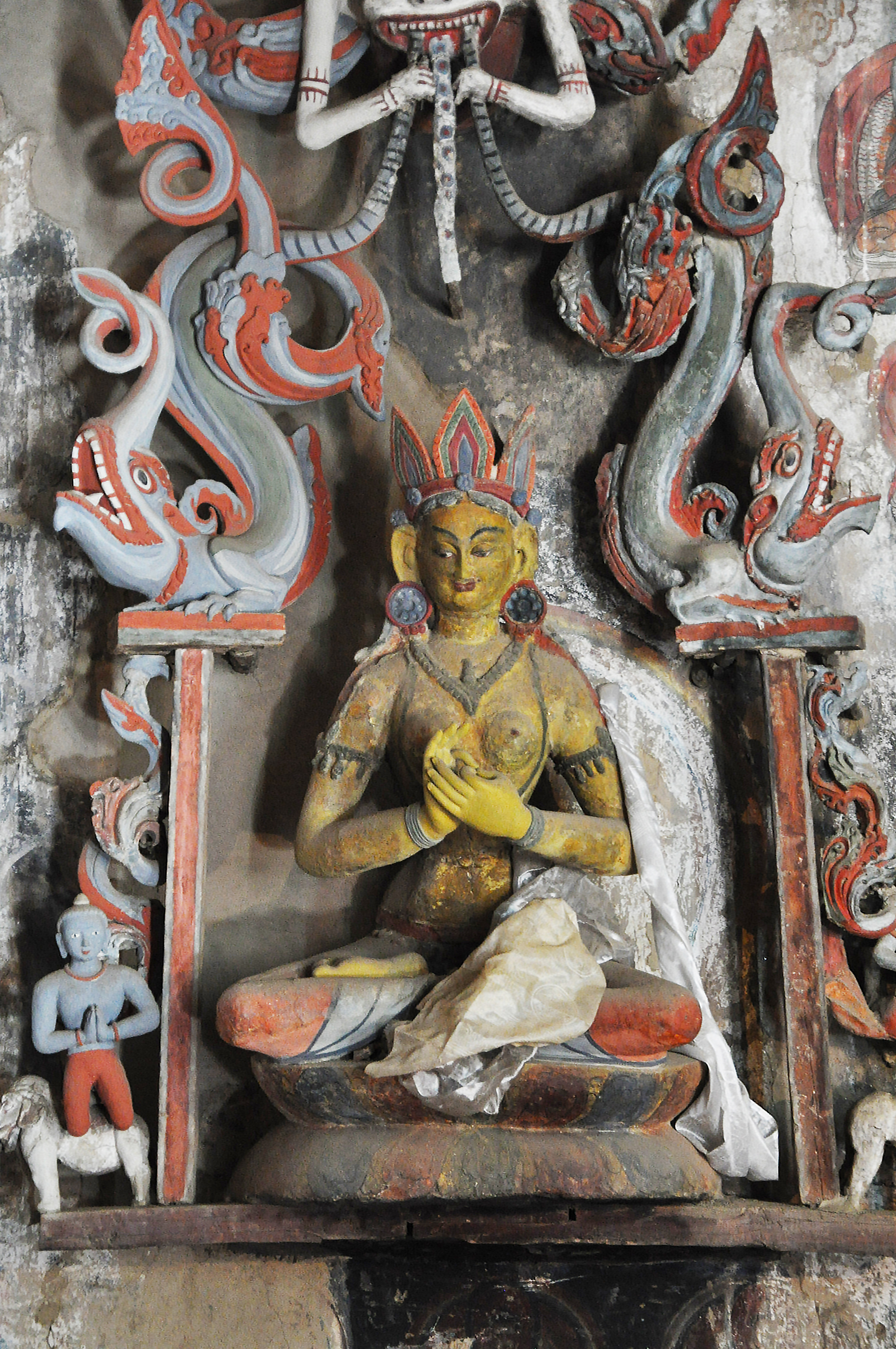
Yellow Tara, Nako Monastery, India

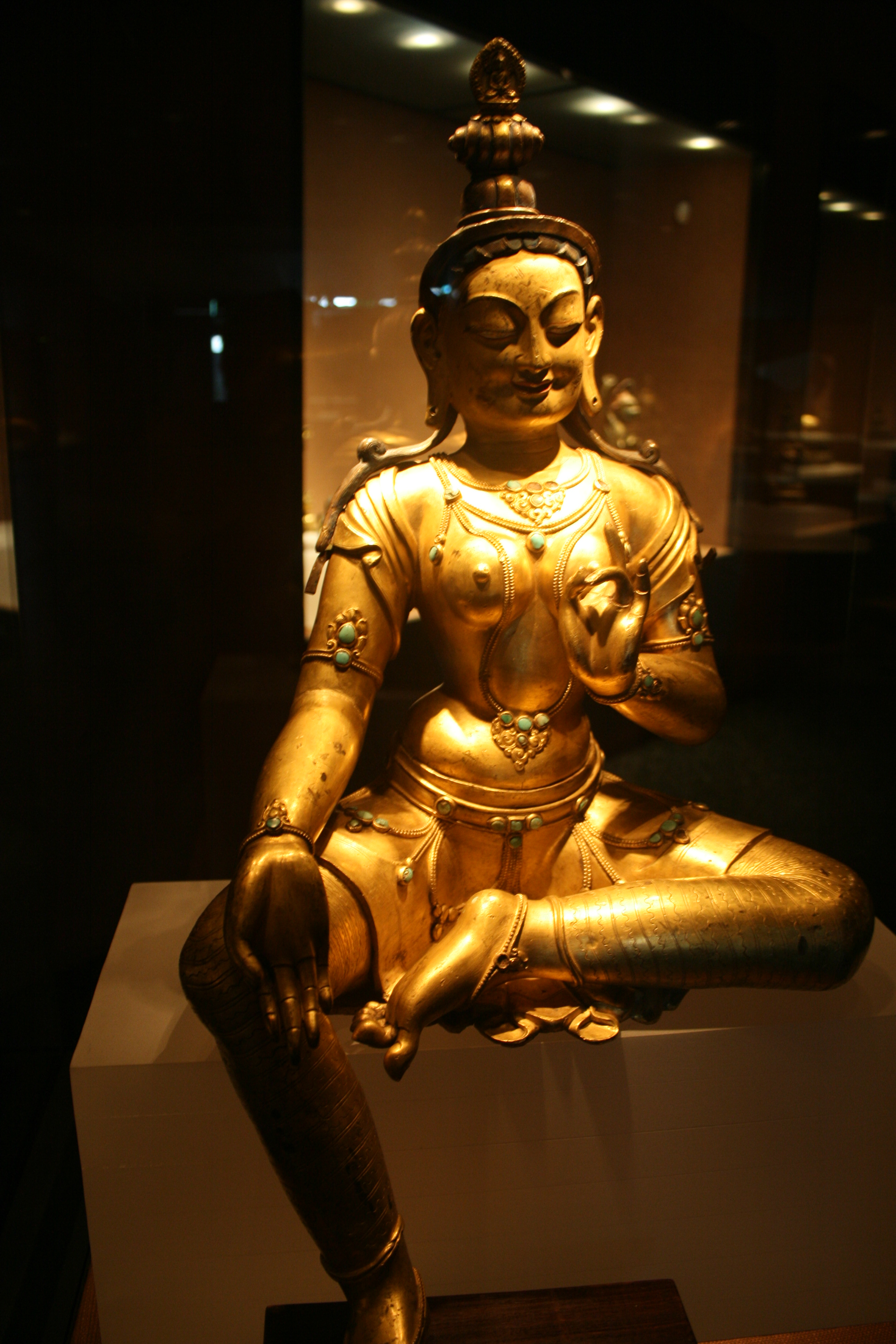
Qing Green Tara

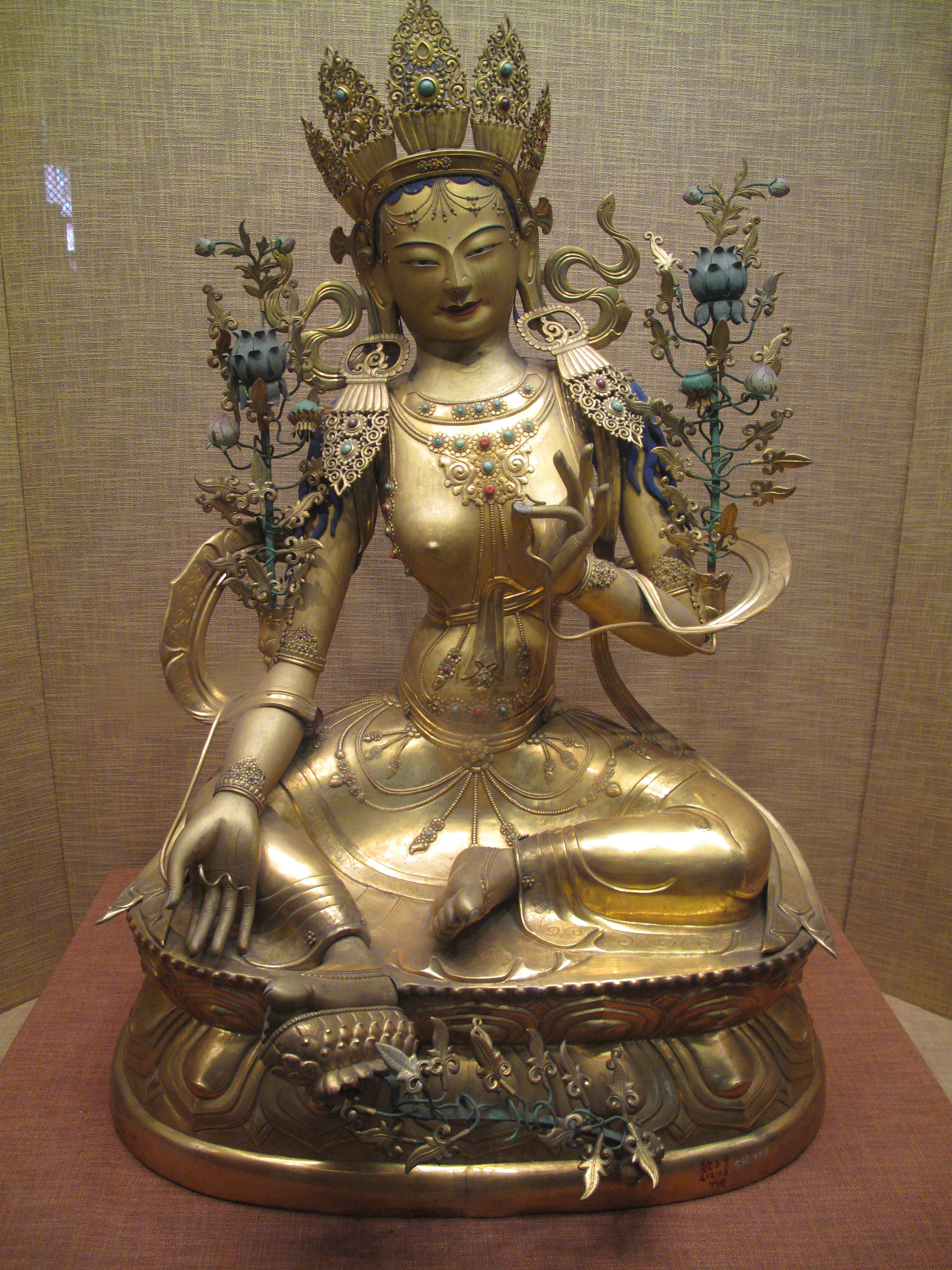
Syama Tara. Reign of Qianlong, 1736–1795. Lama Temple, Beijing

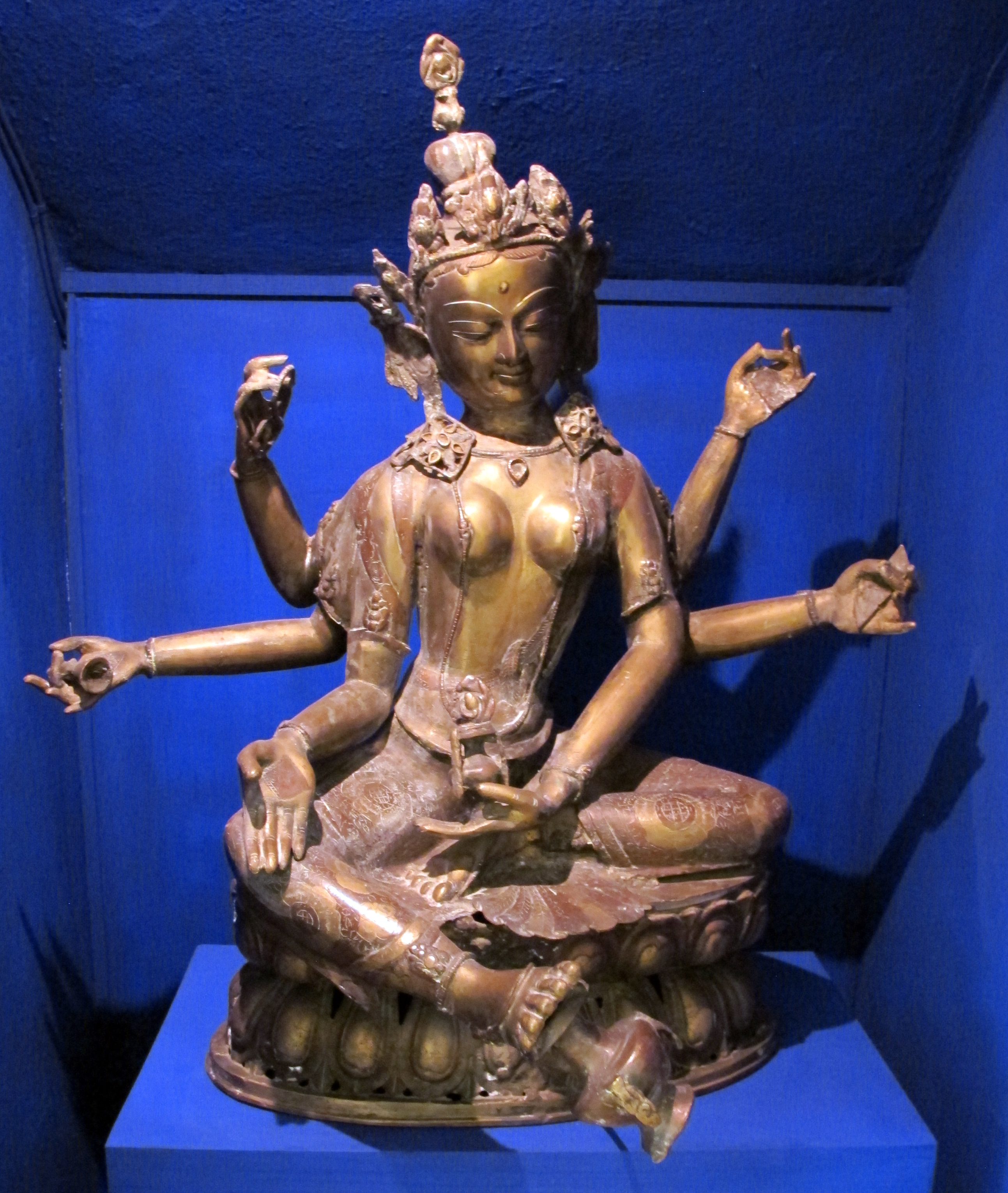
Indian bronze, Museo di storia naturale (Florence)

== See also ==
- Agusan image – Solid gold statue found in the Philippines
- Cundi – Female deity in Vajrayana Buddhism
- Nairatmya – Personification of Buddhist concept of "no soul"
- Vajrayogini – Tantric Buddhist female Buddha and ḍākiṇī
- Tara – Hindu goddess
