= Li Gotami Govinda =

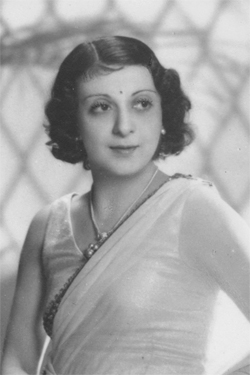
- Born: Ratti Petit; 22 April 1906; Bombay, Bombay Presidency, British India
- Died: 18 August 1988 (aged 82); Pune, Maharashtra, India
- Spouse: Anagarika Govinda (m. 1947; died 1985)

Li Gotami Govinda (born Ratti Petit, 22 April 1906 – 18 August 1988) was an Indian painter, photographer, writer and composer. She was also skilled in ballet and stagecraft. She gained fame with her conversion to Mahayana Buddhism and travels in Tibet.

== Biography ==
Ratti Petit was born on 22 April 1906 in Bombay to an affluent Parsi family. Her family owned the Bomanjee Dinshaw Petit Parsee General Hospital in Cumbala Hill, Bombay. Gotami had at least one sister, Coomie Vakharia, and one brother, Maneckji Petit. She received her education in England at a school located in Harrow on the Hill and later at the Slade School of Fine Art in 1924. Ratti Petit traveled extensively across Europe, before returning to India in the 1930s. In India, she worked with artist Manishi Dey who introduced her to the Bengal School of Art, which significantly influenced her. Petit married art collector and critic Karl Jamshed Khandalavala in the 1930s. However, the marriage was brief. Petit also co-founded the Camera Pictorialists of Bombay in the 1930s.

Petit traveled to Rabindranath Tagore's ashram in Shantiniketan in 1934 to study under artist Nandalal Bose, and to learn Manipuri dance. According to Li Gotami's niece, Sylla Malvi, "Her parents were not happy about her going away. In fact, my grandfather even sent her brother (Maneckji Petit) to check on her." Petit spent 12 years at Shantiniketan. She also earned diplomas from the Arts and Music Schools. She met painter Abanindranath Tagore, who taught at the arts school, eight years later. Tagore was impressed by Petit's paintings and became her mentor. According to Malvi, "She absolutely worshipped Abanindranath Tagore. It was he who told her that she would excel in religious and children's paintings".

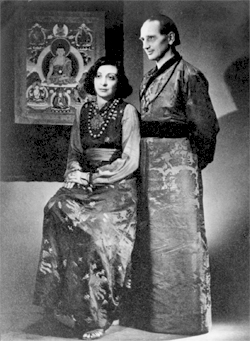
Govinda and Li Gotami after their wedding in 1947.

While at Shantiniketan, Petit also studied under Anagarika Govinda, the Bolivian-German Professor of Vishwa Bharati University. Petit married Govinda in 1947, in four separate ceremonies. Civil ceremonies were held in Bombay and Darjeeling, and "lama marriage" ceremonies were performed in the Chumbi Valley by Ajo Rinpoche and by Govinda himself. Petit converted to Mahayana Buddhism, and adopted the name Li Gotami, against the wishes of her devout Zoroastrian parents. Govinda, who had acquired British citizenship in 1938, became a citizen of India in 1947. The couple lived in a house rented from the writer Walter Evans-Wentz at Kasar Devi, near Almora in northern India. Kasar Devi, in hippie circles known as "Crank's Ridge", was a bohemian colony home to artists, writers and spiritual seekers such as Earl Brewster, Alfred Sorensen and John Blofeld. Many spiritual seekers, including the Beat Poets Allen Ginsberg and Gary Snyder, the LSD Gurus Timothy Leary and Ralph Metzner, the psychiatrist R. D. Laing, and Tibetologist Robert Thurman came to visit Govinda at his ashram. The number of visitors became so great that the couple eventually put signs to keep unwanted visitors away.

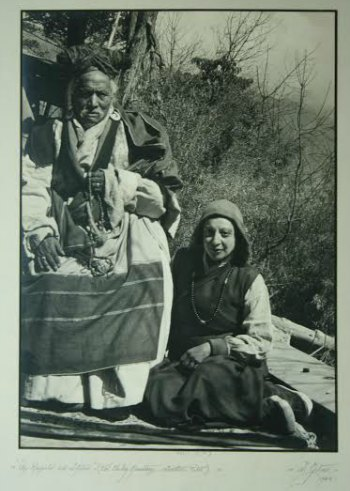
Li Gotami in Tibet with Ajo Repa Rinpoche in 1948.

From Kasar Devi, Li Gotami and Govinda embarked on several expeditions to central and western Tibet in 1947-49. The expeditions were financed by the Illustrated Weekly of India. During these expeditions, they made a large number of paintings, drawings and photographs. These travels are described in Govinda's book The Way of the White Clouds. Li Gotami and Govinda set out on an expedition to Tsaparang in western Tibet in July 1948, arriving in the ancient city in September. They endured harsh conditions in the deserted city taking shelter in a crude stone hut with rough interiors and sooty walls. They ate two meals a day consisting of porridge and chappatis, cooked slowly over yak dung and brushwood fires. The temperature was so low that tea would freeze inside a cup if it was not consumed quickly. The couple stayed in the city until at least December 1948, painstakingly photographing, sketching and tracing surviving frescoes.

Pictures of the Tsaparang frescoes taken by Li Gotami, still intact, appear in Govinda's The Way of the White Clouds Foundations of Tibetan Mysticism and Tibet in Pictures (co-authored with Li Gotami). Li Gotami's photos of Tibet in the late 1940s are one of the last significant pictorial documentations of local life before the Chinese occupation of Tibet and the subsequent destruction during the Cultural Revolution. During their 1947–1948 expeditions to Tibet, Govinda and Li Gotami met Ajo Repa Rinpoche, who, according to Govinda, initiated them into the Kagyüpa school of Tibetan Buddhism.

From 1955, Li Gotami, together with Govinda, lived on a 40-acre estate in Almora, in the north-west of India, where they maintained an ashram and studied painting, Buddhist studies and meditation. The ashram was located in the wilderness and had no access to electricity or running water. From India, in the sixties and seventies, they undertook several lecture journeys, which took them around the world. In 1960, Govinda went to Europe as a representative of Tibetan Buddhism at an international religious conference in Venice. Subsequently, he went to England, Germany, Switzerland, Austria and the Netherlands. In 1965, he went on a lecturing tour through Germany, France, and Switzerland, and in 1968-69, through the USA and Japan. Govinda went on world tours in 1972-73, and 1974-76. In 1977, he visited Germany.

== Death ==
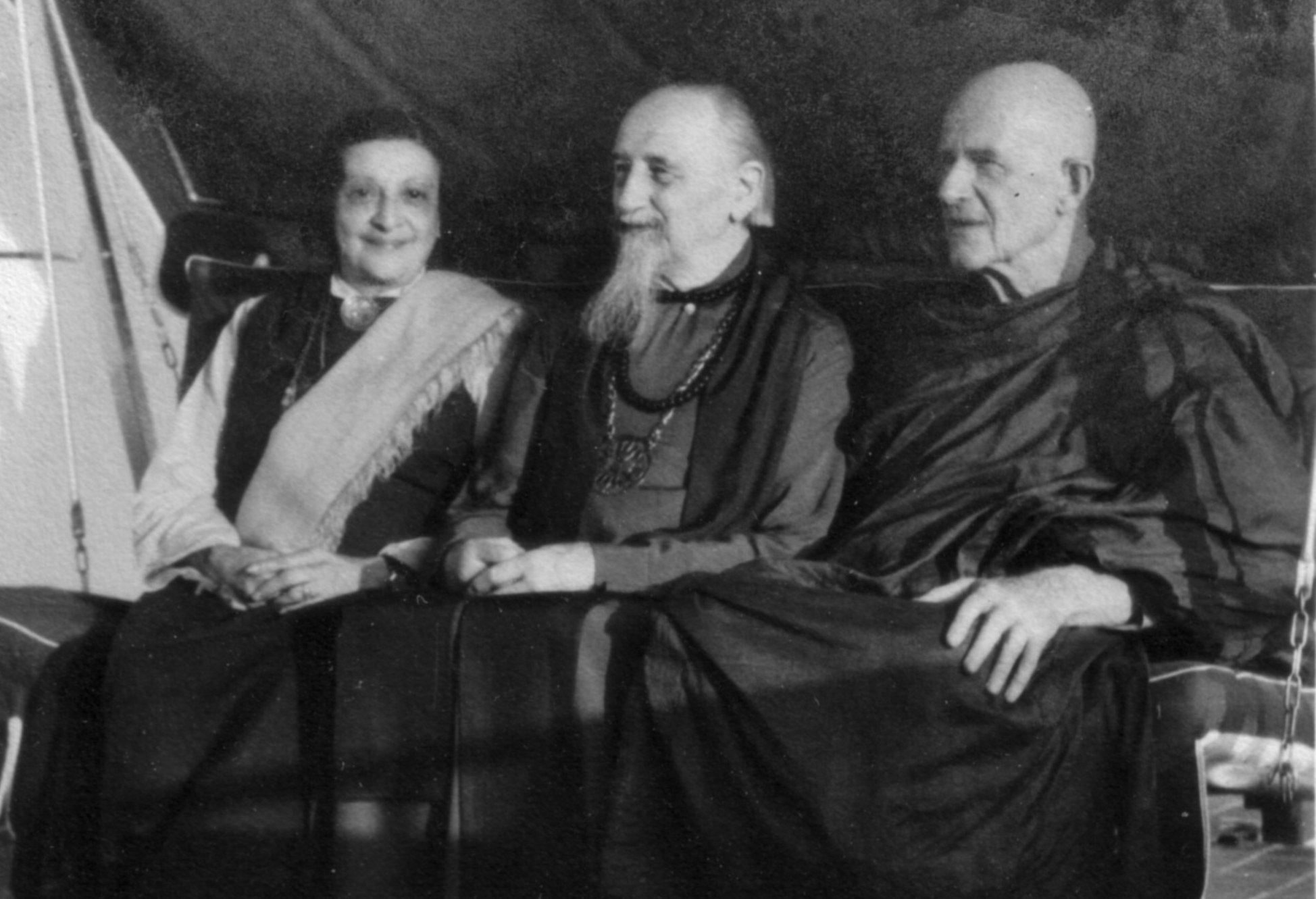
Li Gotami, Govinda, and Nyanaponika Thera in the late 1960s or early 1970s. Probably taken in Germany or Switzerland.

In the early 1970s, Li Gotami and Govinda were invited by American Buddhist scholars to live in the United States. The couple initially lived in Sausalito, California and later settled in Mill Valley in the San Francisco Bay Area for health reasons. Li Gotami had Parkinson's disease, and Govinda suffered several strokes from 1975 onwards. The couple were cared for by Alan Watts and Elsa Gidlow's Society for Comparative Philosophy, and Suzuki Roshi's San Francisco Zen Centre. During an evening discussion on 14 January 1985, Govinda suddenly felt a sharp pain in his neck that traveled downwards. He lay down on his right side and died laughing. Li Gotami lived with her husband in Mill Valley until his death. A few months after her husband's death, Li Gotami returned to India to live with her family. She died in Pune, Maharashtra on 18 August 1988.

Many of her artistic works and fresco tracings from Tibet are held in the collection of the Chhatrapati Shivaji Maharaj Vastu Sangrahalaya in Mumbai. On 2 February 2008, the museum opened an exhibition called "Tibet through the eyes of Li Gotami". The exhibition featured a selection of her photographs, sketches, and fresco tracings.

== Works ==
- Tibet in Pictures. Berkeley 1979, Vol. 1 ISBN 0913546577, Vol. 2 ISBN 0913546585
- Tibetan Fantasies: Paintings, Poems, and Music. Emeryville, Cailf. 1976, ISBN 0913546488
