= Anagarika Govinda =

German Buddhist expositor, painter, and poet

Lama Anagarika Govinda
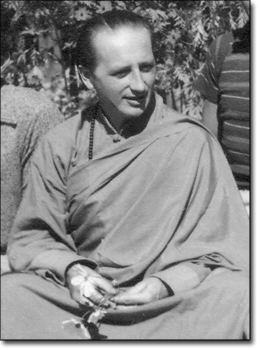
- Govinda, c. 1940–45
- Born: Ernst Lothar Hoffmann; 17 May 1898; Waldheim, Saxony, German Empire
- Died: 14 January 1985 (aged 86); Mill Valley, California, U.S.
- Other names: Lama Govinda
- Citizenship: German (1898–1938); British (1938–47); Indian
- Spouse: Li Gotami Govinda (m. 1947)

Anagarika Govinda (born Ernst Lothar Hoffmann, 17 May 1898 – 14 January 1985) was the founder of the order of the Arya Maitreya Mandala and an expositor of Tibetan Buddhism, Abhidharma, and Buddhist meditation as well as other aspects of Buddhism. He was also a painter and poet.

== Life in Europe ==
Ernst Lothar Hoffmann was born in Waldheim, Germany, the son of a German father and a Bolivian mother. His father was quite well to do and owned a cigar factory. His mother died when he was three years old. While enrolled in the German army during World War I, he caught tuberculosis in Italy and was discharged. He recovered at a sanatorium and then studied philosophy, psychology and archaeology at Freiburg University. He did not finish his studies, but went to live in a German art colony on Capri in Italy, as a painter and poet. He studied at the Universities of Naples and Cagliari and made archeological research journeys in North Africa. He lived on Capri from 1920 until 1928. During his time in Italy Hoffman became familiar with the work of German life-philosopher Ludwig Klages whose biocentric metaphysics greatly fascinated him and influenced his approach to and understanding of Buddhism. Already at the age of 16 he started to study philosophy and by way of Schopenhauer he encountered Buddhism. After having made a comparative study of the major religions, he became a convinced Buddhist at the age of 18. He joined the Bund für buddhistisches Leben (Association for Buddhist Living). On Capri he practiced meditation with an American Buddhist friend.

== Sri Lanka ==
In December 1928, Hoffman moved from Capri to Sri Lanka and stayed as a celibate Buddhist layman (brahmacāri), and later as a celibate, homeless layman (anagarika), for nine weeks at the Island Hermitage with Nyanatiloka Thera, a teacher and scholar in the Theravada tradition. He was instrumental in founding the International Buddhist Union (IBU) in 1929, of which he made Nyanatiloka the president. The aim of the IBU was to unite all Buddhists worldwide and to promote Buddhism through the virtuous and exemplary conduct of practising Buddhists. As secretary of the IBU, he travelled to Burma and Europe to raise support. Although he came to Sri Lanka with the aim of becoming a Buddhist monk, he was discouraged to do so by Anagarika Dharmapala on the grounds that it would be difficult to travel as a Buddhist monk. In 1930 he founded the Variyagoda Hermitage in a tea-estate in the mountains near Gampola, but he only lived there for one year with his German stepmother Anne Habermann who had come with him from Europe. At Variyagoda Govinda studied Abhidhamma and Pali.

== Life and travels in India and Tibet before WWII ==
In April 1931 Govinda went to All-India Buddhist Conference in Darjeeling as the representative of the IBU, to propagate the "pure Buddhist teaching as preserved in Ceylon, in a country where it had degenerated into a system of demon worship and fantastic forms of belief." However, in nearby Sikkim he met the Tibetan Gelugpa meditation teacher Tomo (or Domo) Geshe Rimpoche alias Lama Ngawang Kalzang (1866–1936), who greatly impressed him and completely changed his views about Tibetan Buddhism. From then on he embraced Tibetan Buddhism, although he never abandoned his Theravada roots and stayed in contact with Nyanatiloka and later with Nyanaponika. Lama Ngawang Kalzang taught meditation to Govinda, who remained in contact with him until his death. During their 1947–1948 expeditions to Tibet, Govinda and Li Gotami met Ajo Repa Rinpoche, who, according to Govinda, initiated them into the Kagyüpa school of Tibetan Buddhism.

The scholar Donald Lopez questions whether the 'initiations' that Govinda received are to be understood in the traditional Tibetan way of the term, i.e., as an empowerment by a Lama to carry out Tantric rituals or meditations. When he first met Lama Ngawang Kalzang, Govinda spoke no Tibetan and his description of the initiation is vague. According to Lopez, no initiation into the Kagyu order or any other Tibetan order exists, and it is unclear what was the nature of the initiation ceremony and the teachings that Govinda and his wife received from Ajo Repa Rinpoche. Govinda himself wrote in Foundations of Tibetan Mysticism that he understood 'initiates' to mean 'individuals who, in virtue of their own sensitiveness, respond to the subtle vibrations of symbols which are presented to them either by tradition or intuition.' And in The Way of White Clouds, he wrote: "A real Guru's initiation is beyond the divisions of sects and creeds: it is the awakening to our own inner reality which, once glimpsed, determines our further course of development and our actions in life without the enforcement of outer rules."

Govinda stayed on in India, teaching German and French at Rabindranath Tagore's Visva-Bharati University in Santinekan. He lost interest in the IBU, which caused it to collapse. In 1932 Govinda briefly visited Tibet from Sikkim (visiting Mount Kailash), and in 1933 from Ladakh. The summer months of 1932 and 1934 he and his stepmother, who had followed him to India, stayed at his hermitage at Variyagoda, where a German Buddhist nun, Uppalavaṇṇā (Else Buchholz), and a German monk, Vappo, were then also living. Uppalavaṇṇā acquired the property from Govinda in 1945 and stayed there until the 1970s. In a letter dated 1.9.1934 Govinda wrote that he had come to Sri Lanka accompanied by Rabindranath Tagore and had given a series of lectures on Tibetan Buddhism in various places in Sri Lanka, trying to raise support for the planned Buddhist university at Sarnath. The reception in Sri Lanka was poor and Govinda, who had run out of funds, was quite disappointed.

On orders of Tomo Geshe Rimpoche Govinda founded his order, The Buddhist Order Arya Maitreya Mandala, on 14.10.1933. Fourteen people were then ordained. Govinda received the name Anangavajra Khamsung Wangchuk. In 1934, in Calcutta, he had the first exhibition of his paintings. From 1935 to 1945 he was the general secretary of the International Buddhist University Association (IBUA), for which he held lectures on Buddhist philosophy, history, archeology, etc., at the Buddhist academy at Sarnath. In 1936 he got a teaching position at the University of Patna, from where he gave guest lectures at the universities of Allahabad, Lucknow and Benares. His lectures on Buddhist psychology at the University of Patna were published in 1939 as The Psychological Attitude of Early Buddhist Philosophy, and his lectures at Shantinekan as Psycho-Cosmic Symbolism of the Buddhist Stupa in 1940. In 1938, after two failed attempts and on recommendation of the prime minister of Uttar Pradesh, he managed to become a full British citizen. In 1947 he became a citizen of India. From 1937 to 1940 he lived with his stepmother in a house in Darjeeling.

== World War II ==
Although Govinda was now a British citizen, he was nevertheless interned by the British during WWII due to his associations with "persons of anti-British sympathies," i.e. the Nehru family. First he was interned at Ahmednagar. Because he made no secret of being against Fascism, the Nazis in the prison camp bullied him, just as they did with other anti-fascists. This bullying compelled the British to open a special camp for anti-fascists at Dehra Dun, where he was transferred to in 1942. Nyanatiloka and other German Buddhist monks from Sri Lanka were also interned at Dehra Dun. In the camp Govinda stayed with the German monk Nyanaponika Thera, with whom he studied languages, and formed a close friendship that lasted till the end of his life.

== Life in Kasar Devi after WWII and travels to Tibet ==
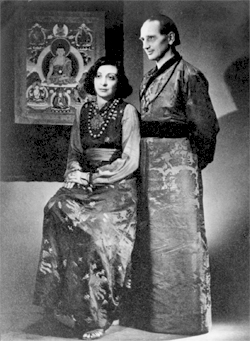
Lama Govinda and Li Gotami after their wedding in 1947.

In 1947 he married the Parsi artist Li Gotami (original name Ratti Petit, 22 April 1906 – 18 August 1988) from Bombay, who, as a painter, had been his student at Santinekan in 1934. Govinda and Li Gotami wore Tibetan styles robes and were initiates in the Drugpa Kagyu lineage. The couple lived in a house rented from the writer Walter Evans-Wentz at Kasar Devi, near Almora in northern India. Kasar Devi, in hippie circles known as 'Crank's Ridge', was a bohemian colony home to artists, writers and spiritual seekers such as Earl Brewster, Alfred Sorensen and John Blofeld. Many spiritual seekers, including the Beat Poets Allen Ginsberg and Gary Snyder, the LSD Gurus Timothy Leary and Ralph Metzner, the psychiatrist R. D. Laing, and Tibetologist Robert Thurman came to visit Govinda at his ashram. The number of visitors became so great that the couple eventually put signs to keep unwanted visitors away.

From Kasar Devi, Govinda and Li Gotami undertook journeys to Tibet in the late 1940s, making a large number of paintings, drawings and photographs. These travels are described in Govinda's book The Way of the White Clouds. While on the expedition to Tsaparang and Tholing in Western Tibet in 1948–49, sponsored by the Illustrated Weekly of India, Govinda received initiations in the Nyingma and Sakyapa lineages. Pictures of the Tsaparang frescoes taken by Li Gotami, then, before the Cultural Revolution, still intact appear in Govinda's The Way of the White Clouds Foundations of Tibetan Mysticism and Tibet in Pictures (co-authored with Li Gotami). In The Way of the White Clouds Govinda writes that he was a reincarnation of the poet Novalis.

== 1960s and 1970s world tours ==
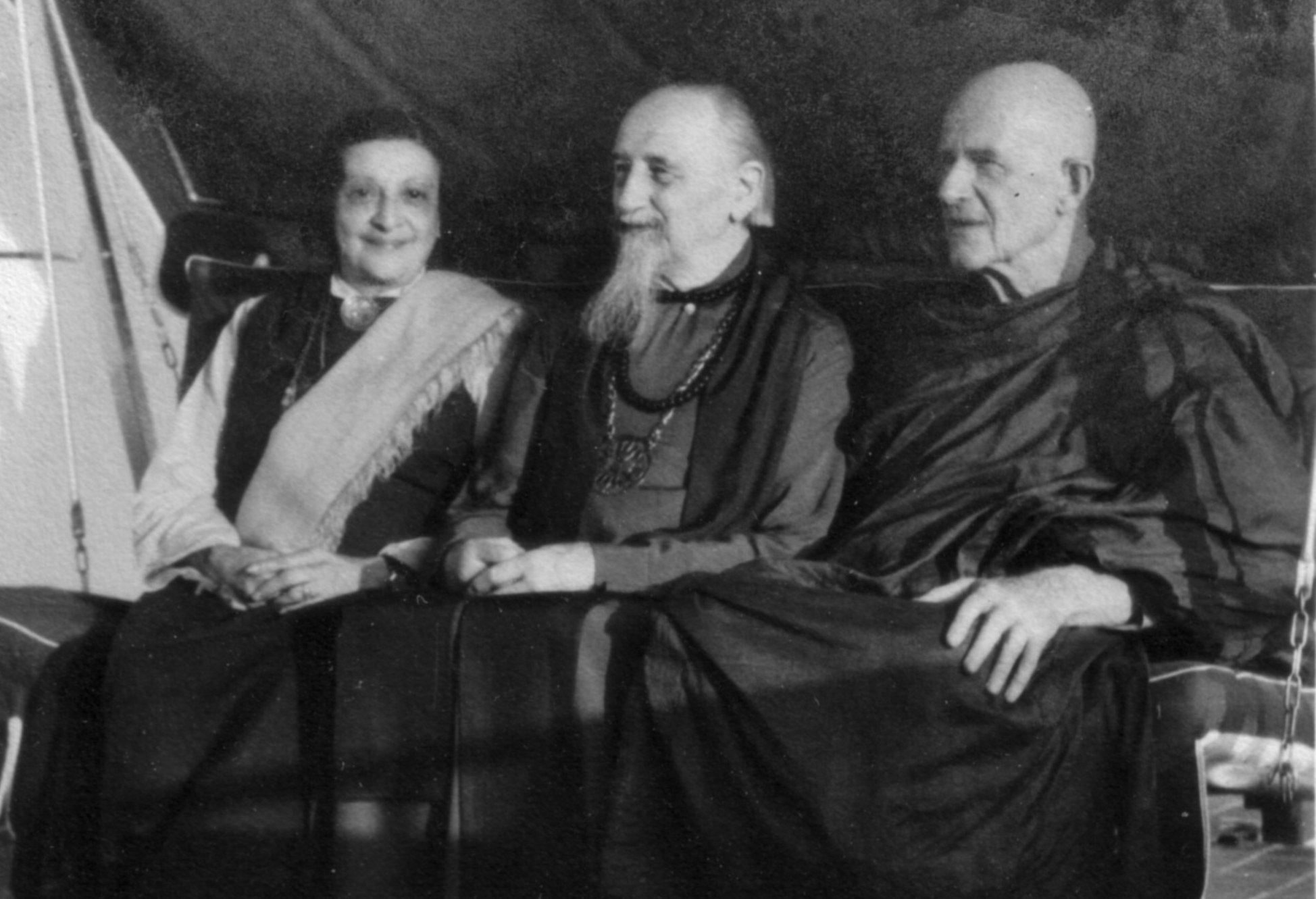
Li Gotami, Anagariki Govinda, Nyanaponika Thera, late 1960s or early 1970s

The German Hans-Ulrich Rieker, who was ordained in the Arya Maitreya Mandala Order in 1952, was ordered by Govinda to set up a Western wing of the Order. The founding took place simultaneously in Berlin by Rieker, and in Sanchi by Govinda, on 30.11.1952. In 1960 Govinda went to Europe as a representative of Tibetan Buddhism at an international religious conference in Venice. Subsequently, he went to England, Germany, Switzerland, Austria and the Netherlands. In 1965 he went on a lecturing tour through Germany, France, and Switzerland. In 1968–69 through the US and Japan. In 1972–73, and 1974–76 he went on world tours. In 1977 he last visited Germany.

On his journeys to the West Govinda made friends with the Swiss philosopher Jean Gebser, the Zen and Taoist teacher Alan Watts, the pioneer of transcendental psychotherapy Roberto Assagioli and the author Luise Rinser.

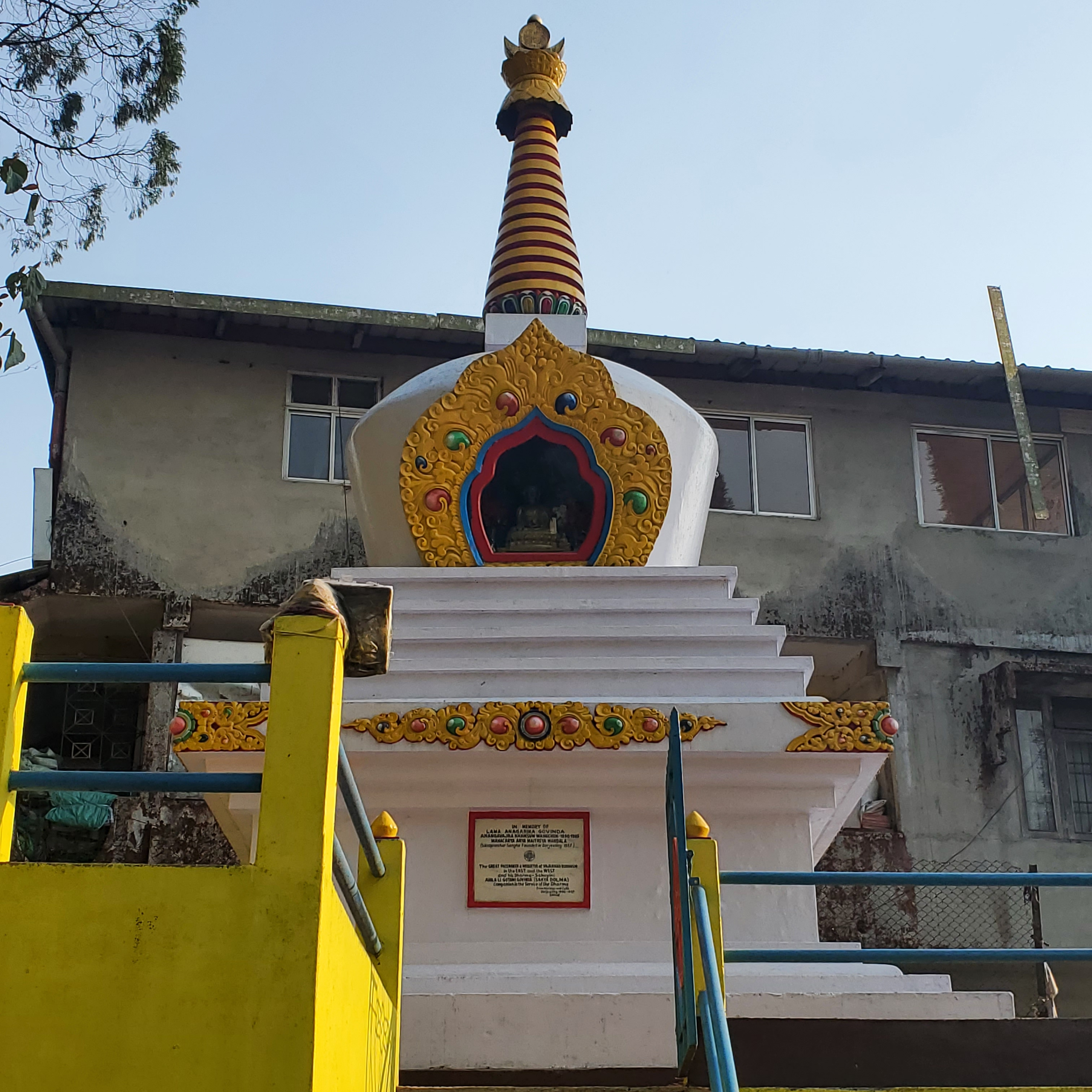
Lama Govinda Stupa

== Later years ==
For health reasons Govinda finally settled in the San Francisco Bay area, where he and his wife were taken care of by Alan Watts and Suzuki Roshi's San Francisco Zen Centre. In San Francisco he established a branch of his order, called "Home of Dhyan". In 1980 he visited India for a last time and gave up his house in Almora. He remained mentally agile despite suffering from several strokes from 1975 onwards. During an evening discussion on 14.1.1985, he suddenly felt a sharp pain in his neck that traveled downwards. He lay down on his right side and died laughing.

His ashes were placed in the Nirvana-Stupa, which was erected in 1997 on the premises of Samten Choeling Monastery popularly known as Ghum Monastery in Darjeeling.

== Writings ==
Govinda wrote several books on a wide variety of Buddhist topics. His most well known books are The Way of the White Clouds and Foundations of Tibetan Mysticism, which were translated in many languages. Some of his works such as Foundations of Tibetan Mysticism were written in German and were subsequently translated to English. His articles were published in many Buddhist journals such as the Maha Bodhi, and the German journal Der Kreis published by his Buddhist Order Arya Maitreya Mandala. Govinda considered The Inner Structure of the I Ching, the Book of Transformation as his most important book.

=== Works in English ===
- Art and Meditation, (an introduction and 12 abstract paintings), Allahabad 1936.
- The Psychological Attitude of Early Buddhist Philosophy, Allahabad 1937; New Delhi (Motilal Banarsidass Publishers), 1992: ISBN 81-208-0941-6, 1998 edition: ISBN 81-208-0952-1
- Psycho-Cosmic Symbolism of the Buddhist Stupa, Emeryville 1976 (Dharma Publishing): ISBN 0-913546-36-4. First shorter edition published as Some Aspects of Stupa Symbolism, Allahabad 1936.
- Foundations of Tibetan Mysticism, London 1957, 1959, 1969 edition, ISBN 0-87728-064-9
- The Way of the White Clouds, London 1966; Fourth reprint, 1972. 1988 edition: ISBN 0-87773-462-3, reprint: ISBN 0-87773-007-5, Hardcover: ISBN 1-58567-465-6, Paperback: ISBN 1-58567-785-X, Ebury: ISBN 0-7126-5543-3.
- Tibet in Pictures: A Journey into the Past, coauthored with Li Gotami, 1979, 2004, Dharma Publishing. ISBN 978-0-89800-345-1
- Drugs or Meditation? Consciousness Expansion and Disintegration versus Concentration and Spiritual Regeneration, Kandy 1973, Buddhist Publication Society, Bodhi Leaves Series No. 62.
- Creative Meditation and Multi-Dimensional Consciousness, London 1976, Allen and Unwin.
- Pictures of India and Tibet, Haldenwang and Santa Cruz 1978. (Perhaps identical with Tibet in Pictures: A Journey into the Past?)
- The Inner Structure of the I Ching, the Book of Transformation, San Francisco 1981 (Wheelwright Press). Reprinted: Art Media Resources, ISBN 0-8348-0165-5
- A Living Buddhism for the West, Boston 1990, (Shambhala), translated by Maurice Walshe, ISBN 0-87773-509-3

=== Compilations ===
- Buddhist Reflections, New Delhi 1994, Motilal Banarsidass, ISBN 81-208-1169-0 (Collected essays.)
- Insights of a Himalayan Pilgrim, Oakland 1991, Dharma Press. ISBN 0-89800-204-4. (Thirteen later essays on Buddhism, art, and the spirituality that appeared in American, British, German Buddhist magazines.)
- The Lost Teachings of Lama Govinda: Living Wisdom from a Modern Tibetan Master, Wheaton, IL, 2008, Quest Books. Ed. Richard Power, Foreword by Lama Surya Das. ISBN 978-0-8356-0854-1 (Collection of essays and dialogues. Includes a comprehensive introduction to Govinda's life and work by R. Power.)

== Sources ==
- Hellmuth Hecker, Lebensbilder Deutscher Buddhisten Band I: Die Gründer. Konstanz, 1990, 2. verb. Aufl. Verlag Beyerlein-Steinschulte, Stammbach, ISBN 978-3-931095-57-4. (A whole chapter is on pp. 84–115 is on Govinda. Includes an extensive bibliography.)
- Volker Zotz, Ludwig Klages as reflected by Lama Anagarika Govinda, in: Gunnar Alksnis, Chthonic Gnosis – Ludwig Klages and his Quest for the Pandaemonic All, Theion Publishing, Munich 2015
- Bhikkhu Nyanatusita and Hellmuth Hecker, The Life of Nyanatiloka: The Biography of a Western Buddhist Pioneer, Kandy, 2009, ISBN 978-955-24-0290-6. Book
- Hellmuth Hecker, Der Erste Deutsche Bhikkhu: Das bewegte Leben des Ehrwürdigen Nyanatiloka (1878–1957) und seiner Schüler. Konstanz 1995 (University of Konstanz; reprinted by Verlag Beyerlein – Steinschulte) ISBN 978-3-931095-67-3. (A whole chapter, pp. 155–176, is on Govinda and includes his correspondence with Nyanatiloka from 1931 to 1939.)
- Donald S. Lopez, Prisoners of Shangri-La: Tibetan Buddhism and the West, Chicago 1998.
- Birgit Zotz, 'Tibetische Mystik: nach Lama Anagarika Govinda Lama Anagarika Govinda'
