= Cranks' Ridge =

Cranks' Ridge, sometimes called Hippie Hill, is a pine-covered ridge located on the way to Kasar Devi temple, above the town of Almora, Uttarakhand, India, the ancient capital of Kumaon.

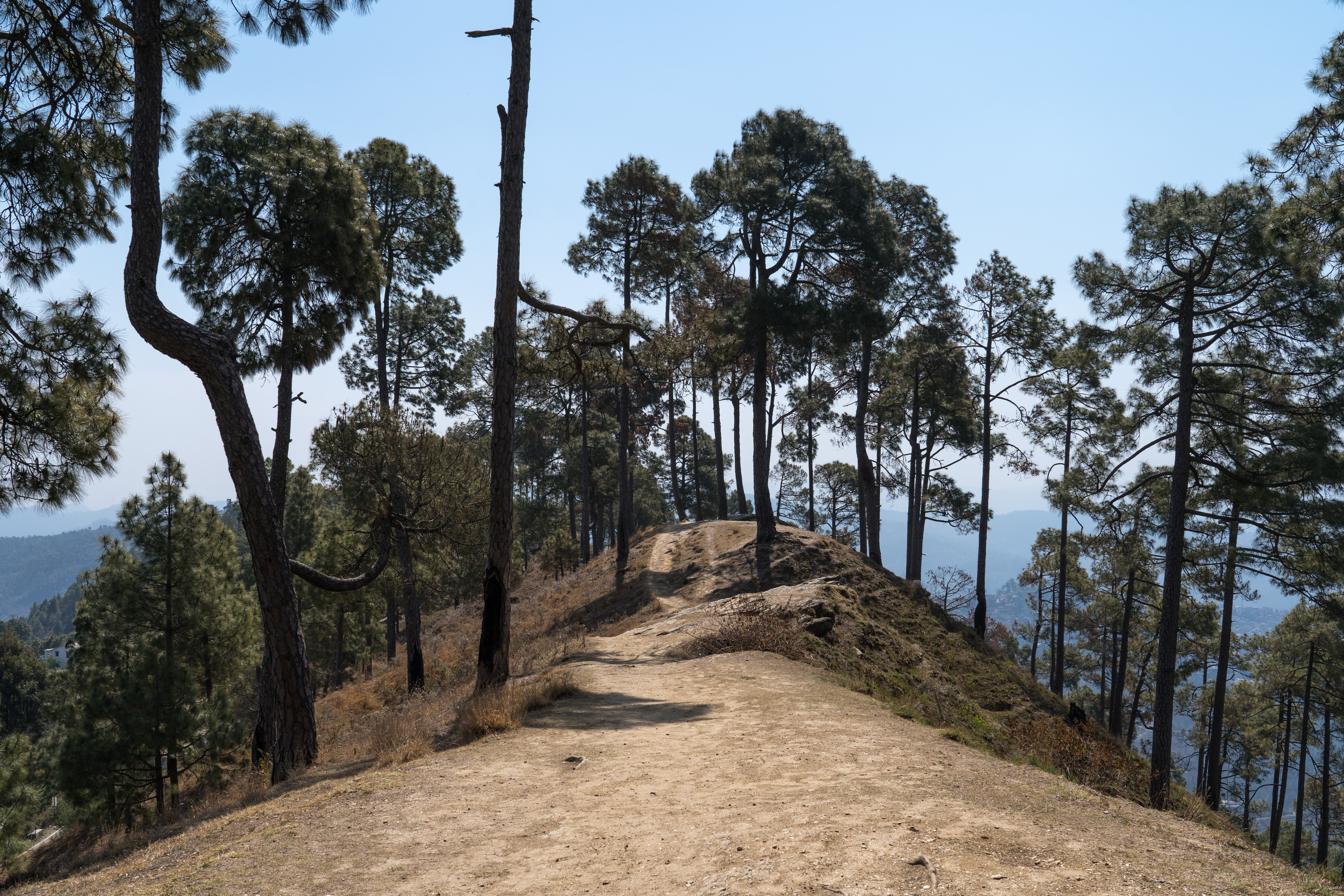
Crank's Ridge

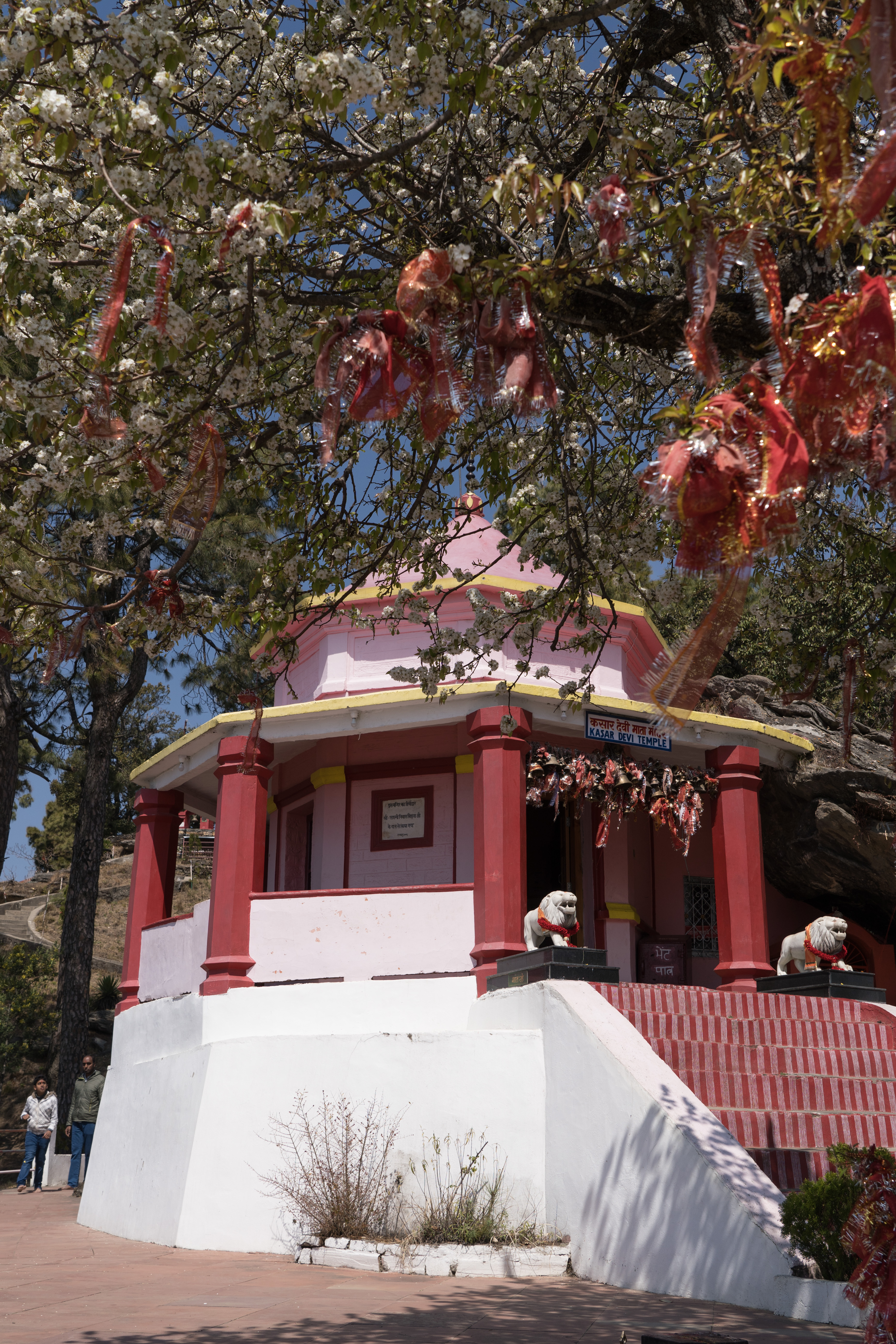
Kasar Devi Temple

Kasar Devi is a temple on the Kaashaay Hills, 7 km north from Almora, where Swami Vivekananda once came to meditate in the late 19th century. The place, got its popular name, Crank's Ridge, ever since Timothy Leary streaked on the ridge in the 1960s, when it became part of the Hippie trail, during the peak of hippie movement.

== History ==
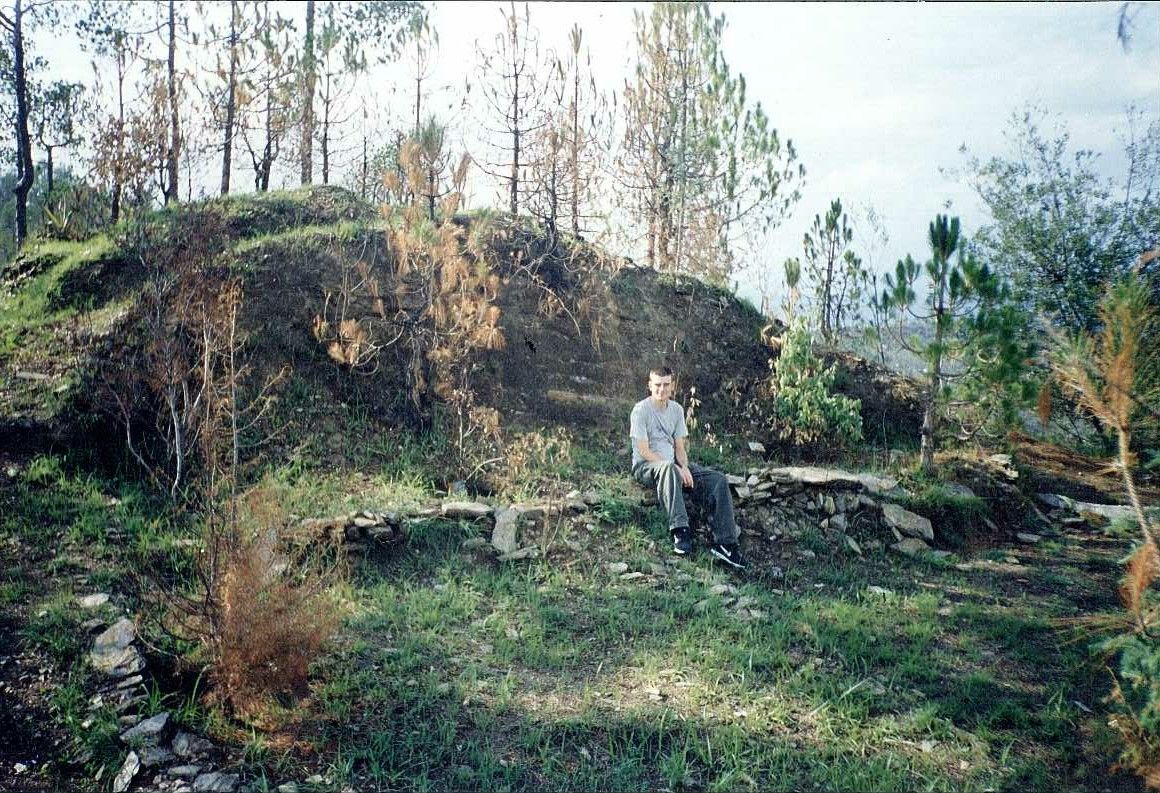
The remains of Alfred Sorensen (Sunyata)'s cave, near Crank's Ridge in 1999

The ridge became a haunt for bohemian artists, writers and spiritual seekers in the 1920s and 1930s, including notable western Tibetan Buddhists, W. Y. Evans-Wentz, and Lama Anagarika Govinda, who in turn was visited by Anandamayi Ma and Neem Karoli Baba. Other early people connected to Crank's Ridge were Earl Brewster, an American artist and his wife Achsah Barlow Brewster, author John Blofeld and Danish mystic Alfred Sorensen. In 1934, Alfred Sorensen who was earlier introduced to Nehru by Tagore, visited the home of Nehru's sister and brother-in-law at their house Khali, Binsar where he stayed and used his horticultural skills in the garden, while still travelling during the summer. It was while staying with the Nehru family that one of their friends offered Sorensen a piece of land where he could live on Crank's Ridge, near Almora.

In the 1960s and 1970s, luminaries of the counter-culture, including Bob Dylan and Cat Stevens made pilgrimages to the ridge to visit these established inhabitants. In 1962, Allen Ginsberg came with Peter Orlovsky, Gary Snyder and Joanne Kyger to visit Lama Govinda. Ginsberg commented in a letter to John Kelley that "Rishikesh and Almora were not unlike the Catskills readily accessible, only more spiritual." In late 1964, Ralph Metzner visited Lama Govinda on the ridge and was later joined by Timothy Leary on honeymoon with his wife Nena von Schlebrügge. The marriage did not last long. Leary wrote much of Psychedelic Prayers, a psychedelic version the Tao Te Ching composed from nine English translations of the book, on the ridge. Later in the decade Richard Alpert (Ram Dass), visited the ridge as a part of his own pilgrimage. Scottish psychiatrist, R. D. Laing spent some time there in the early 1970s; as did Robert Thurman, the Buddhist scholar, who spent six months with his wife Nena von Schlebrügge and family, including their 3-year-old daughter Uma Thurman, studying with Lama Govinda as a part of his doctoral dissertation over the summer of 1971. Lama Govinda's ashram was visited by many other spiritual seekers. Physician Karl-Heinz Gottmann, composer Peter Michael Hamel and the philosopher Volker Zotz visited his ashram. In the mid-seventies Alfred 'Sunyata' Sorensen was taken to San Francisco by the Alan Watts society.

The village of Kasar Devi has now become a cult destination, many incognito celebs visit frequently and it also has a small community of backpackers. Participants of the hippie movement settled there ever since the place gained the reputation of being a Power Centre during the 1960s counter-culture. This reputation is due to the alleged gap in the Van Allen Belt above the ridge, a perception arguably strengthened by the free and easy availability of hemp on the slopes.

There is also a Buddhist meditation center on the ridge. This Center is in a Buddhist Ashram (Bodh Ashram), originally the estate of Evans-Wentz, then of Lama Anagarika Govinda, then of a Tibetan-Ladakhi family. The Center is affiliated to the Drikung Kagyu order of Tibetan Buddhism.

== See also ==
- Manali
- Goa
