= Kieran Leonard =

English musician (born 1987)

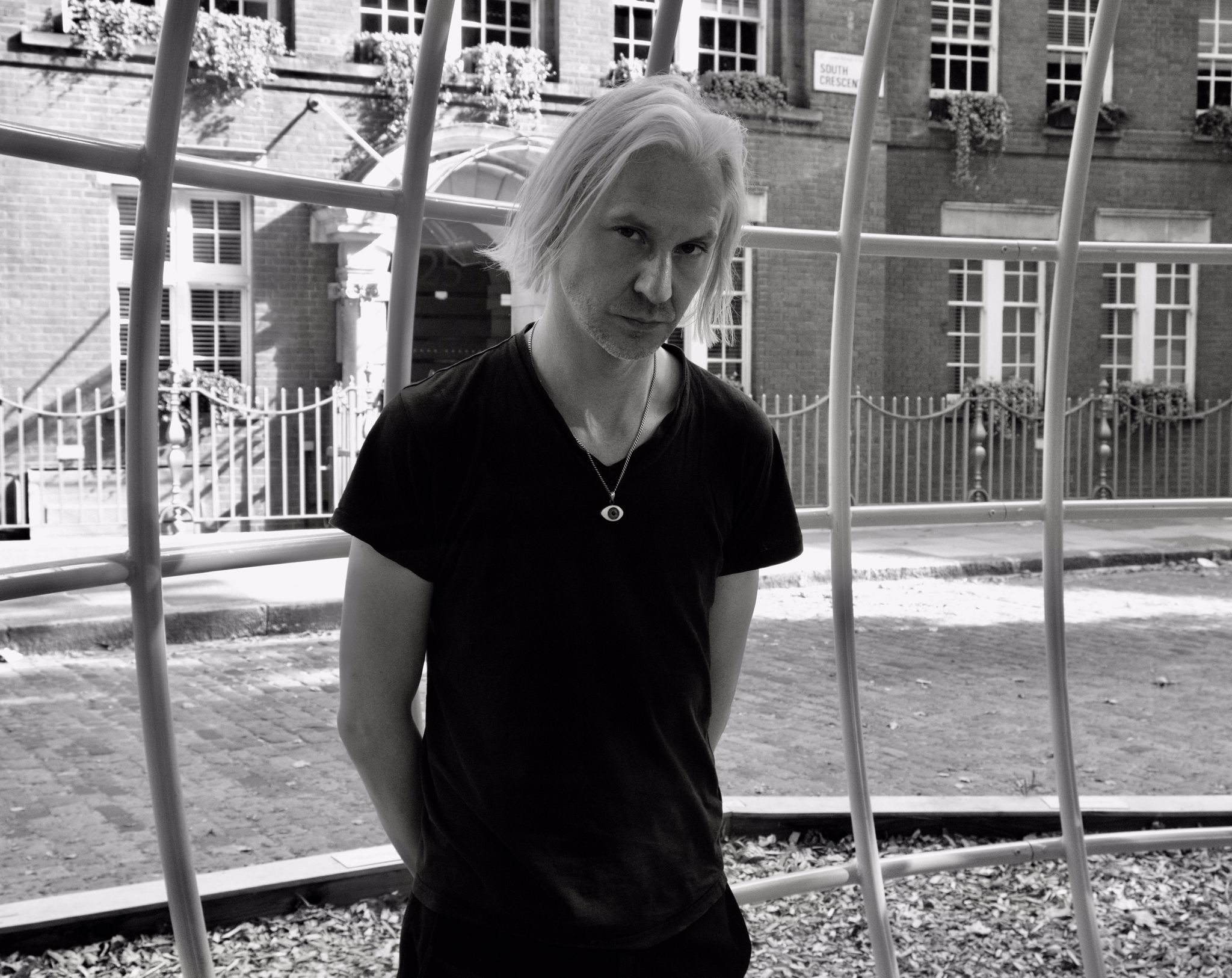
- Leonard photographed in 2022

Background information
- Born: 1987 (age 38–39)
- Genres: Indie Rock, Folk Rock, Alternative Rock
- Instruments: Vocals, Guitar, Piano
- Years active: 2009-present
- Label: Fierce Panda Xtra Mile Recordings

Kieran Leonard, also known as Saint Leonard and Saint Leonard's Horses, is a British musician, songwriter, actor and author.

From 2009 to 2015, Leonard wrote and performed under his own name, releasing one album, an EP and four singles. His second album Good Luck Everybody (2016) and third album The Golden Hour (2025) were both released under the Saint Leonard moniker.

== Early life ==
Leonard spent much of his childhood travelling. He has two older brothers, and has never known his father but has a good relationship with his mother. His upbringing has been described as 'unorthodox'. His restless upbringing left an indelible impression, and a sense of displacement and alienation would become one of the central themes of much of his creative work. Leonard has stated in several interviews that he was inspired to write music after watching a David Bowie retrospective at the age of 13, and subsequently wrote 100 songs in the space of six months. In both his work and interviews Leonard often cites writers and world literature as a central influence on his musical output.

== Career ==
In 2009, Leonard recorded his first professional demos at London's Konk Studios. The Scapegoat EP was produced by The Libertines' Carl Barât, and was mixed by Chris Sheldon. The four songs were released as individual tracks timed to coincide with the full moon each month. This unusual release schedule garnered some media attention and led to Leonard being invited to perform on Absolute Radio UK for two of the "Full Moon" release nights.

The following year he recorded and released his debut single 'Jerusalem'. The single was well received both critically and commercially, and appeared in the soundtrack for Ridley Scott's film Life in a Day. 'Jerusalem' was noted for its timely response to the social unrest occurring in London at the time, and for its relevance to the global Occupy movement in particular.

=== Out of Work Astronaut (2012) ===
Kieran Leonard's debut album Out of Work Astronaut was recorded largely in a home studio in North London and released in August 2012. It featured the singles 'Harold Pinter is Dead', 'Wooden Man', 'Vampire', and 'Air Raid'. The album garnered generally favourable reviews, being listed as one of BBC London's Albums of the Year, and enabled Leonard to tour UK and Europe several times.

=== Los Angeles recording sessions (2013–2015) ===
In 2013, Leonard left the UK and moved to California. Citing the collapse of a long-term relationship, he abandoned the gothic church where he had been living on the Moors of North Yorkshire and spontaneously moved to Los Angeles for an indefinite time.

Upon his arrival he was offered a tour of California with Australian rock band Wolfmother. This delayed the commencement of recording by a month, and was the first of a series of unusual and chance occurrences that led to the entire recording session taking almost 10 months. Leonard ended up using several Hollywood studios and producers, however he was ultimately dissatisfied with the extensive LA sessions, despite having been enthused and inspired by the musicians and artists he had met and worked with. He also cites the friendships and experiences he had while there as reason enough for the costly abandoned year of recordings.

=== Nashville – London (2014–2015) ===
In late 2014, Leonard left Los Angeles, briefly returned to London, and then for a short time his whereabouts were totally unknown. He was later found to have taken up residence in a log cabin on the outskirts of Nashville, Tennessee, where he spent several months writing a semi-autobiographical novel. He continued working in isolation until Autumn 2014, ultimately completing a draft of the book alongside an extensive batch of new songs.

=== Kubrick recording sessions (2015) ===
In January 2015, Leonard was invited to continue work on his upcoming second album at Stanley Kubrick's family estate in St. Albans, Hertfordshire. The intention cited by Leonard was to record the material he had developed in LA as entirely 'live' as possible, with his band playing together in the same room and even his lead vocals being laid down 'live' with the track. This now quite unusual approach was drawn from his negative experience of digital multi-tracking in LA and also his desire to capture the heightened spontaneity of records such as Bob Dylan's Blonde on Blonde and The Rolling Stones' Exile on Main Street.

Leonard immediately released the single 'Underwood Milk' on Fierce Panda Records from this session and in February embarked on an extensive tour of UK and Europe with his friend Father John Misty.

It was during the Kubrick sessions that Leonard and his band improvised and recorded the fifteen minute long 'The Greatest Show on Earth' in a single take. After its release the song was noted in the music press for its satirical tone and its references to current social and political issues. Figures and corporations referenced in the track include Ai Wei Wei, Edward Snowden, Julian Assange, Amazon, Apple, and Google.

=== Saint Leonard's Horses (2016) ===
At the end of a busy 2015 full of extensive festival appearances and many London shows, Leonard left the capital once again and maintained sporadic contact with his team in the UK. He eventually surfaced in late December in the Mojave Desert residing in a motel near Joshua Tree, where he was undergoing what he describes as a transcendental mystical experience. After this, he became known as Saint Leonard. He cites the experience of the Kubrick estate and several bizarre episodes in the isolation of the desert as the grounds for this shift in artistic identity.

With the start of 2016, Leonard continued to adapt his musical stylings under his new moniker and started performing with a full band known as The Horses. It was later announced that Leonard had signed to the indie Label Xtra Mile Recordings, with the contract being signed on the grave of William Blake.

=== Good Luck Everybody (2016–2019) ===
Good Luck Everybody was the first work published under the Saint Leonard's Horses banner. It was recorded at Childwickbury Manor in St Albans, the former estate of Stanley Kubrick. The album was released in October 2016 to significant critical acclaim. Mark Beaumont of NME called it "a surrealist, mystical odyssey of self-discovery, maximal hedonism and jaws-of-death revelation". Clash Magazine commented that it was "Weird, wonderful and evocative - a broad, cinematic, engrossing piece of work, rippling with ambition". The album also received praise from GigSoup who included it as one of their top 13 albums of 2016. Tom Doyle from Q magazine gave the album a four star rating, describing it as "top notch stuff that draws comparisons with Neil Young and Father John Misty".

On 2 June 2017, Saint Leonard released 'Little Girl Scientist', the first single from the album. A music video was released on 12 June, directed by Markus Schroder and starring Sophie Kennedy Clark; with Jonathan Meades providing additional narration.

Both 'Little Girl Scientist' and 'Rise Up' garnered strong support from BBC 6 Music upon their release, with presenter Tom Robinson describing the album as 'Brilliant, adventurous music from an extraordinarily talented artist'. On December 23 2017, Leonard joined Robinson in the 6 Music studio for a two hour session where the host played the majority of the album.

=== India, Church Studios sessions and third album (2017–2019) ===
In 2017, Leonard travelled to Rishikesh, India to visit Beatles Ashram, where he spent several weeks writing material for his third album. He then travelled to the Devi temple located at Kasar Devi. The site is a famous Hindu shrine which sits high at an altitude of 2,116 ft in the Himalayas. Here, Leonard studied transcendental meditation and Hindu philosophy with monks and teachers at the shrine. He stayed in the Nepalese hotel on Crank's Ridge known for the extended stays of Bob Dylan, George Harrison and Timothy Leary.

In 2018, Leonard began collaborating with guitarist Joshua Hayward of the Horrors, alongside Bassist Panda from TOY and former Klaxons member Steffan Halperin rejoining on drums.

Leonard started recording material for what was to become the basis of his upcoming third record at Paul Epworth's The Church Studios in Crouch End. Of the 11 or so songs recorded in this session 'Light Years' was selected as a single and released in May 2019.

The single was received to very favourable reviews with NME declaring 'The result is a psych-rock cracker that sounds like the great lost collaboration between Sgt. Pepper's Lonely Hearts Club Band, The Spiders From Mars and Sunn 0))), drifting by in a giddy swirl of surreal visions, H. G. Wells references ("he knows what sells”), inappropriate behaviour at major tourist landmarks (“I undress you on The Bridge of Sighs”) and space-age philosophies. “I’m an existentialist with an Oxycontin kiss,” Leonard wails at the chorus. We bet he is. ‘Light Years’: ahead of the game.'

The Music video released for 'Light Years' is a single shot of Leonard performing the song live in Abbey Road Studios 'Studio One' on a piano originally used by The Beatles. To mark the release date of the show Saint Leonard performed a headline show at 'Electrowerkz' London.

In June, another track taken from the church album sessions titled 'Dark Miracles' was released, accompanied by a notably avant garde music video featuring the Korean visual artist Seulgi Lee Kang.

=== Club NME secret show (2019) ===
In June 2019, Leonard was invited to play the inaugural return of the legendary Club NME hosted at the Moth Club in Hackney, London. He was billed to headline alongside "a very special guest". Shortly before the event it was rumoured that the special guest was in fact Dave Grohl (Foo Fighters, Nirvana).

On the night, Leonard performed an hour-long set, with Grohl joining Leonard in performing a stripped-down set alongside members of the Foo Fighters and Rick Astley.

=== Pandemic and move to Berlin (2020–2022) ===
In March 2020, during the first national lockdown due to the COVID-19 pandemic in the United Kingdom, Leonard commenced a sequence of 'Live Transmission Gigs' from his living room in Highgate, London. The shows were live streamed weekly in association with Clash Magazine to a nightly online audience of roughly 250k viewers via the CLASH Magazine instagram and website platform. He was joined each week by a special guest. These included musician Josh T Pearson live from Texas and Jonathan Meades in Marseille. Each week, Leonard sent out 'Lockdown Letters' to any viewers who signed up; these letters often included golden tickets for a special free concert after the pandemic as well a free bottle of Black Tot Rum.

In September 2020, Leonard relocated to the relatively re-opened Berlin, Germany to continue work on his third album. He initially moved to an apartment in the Neukolln district. Leonard quickly became involved in the Berlin art scene and was invited to read from his forthcoming novel 'A Muse' at the Neurotitan Gallery. Other contributors to this event included Irish author Rob Doyle and poet Kirsty Allison. It was at this reading that Leonard was introduced to Nathan Saoudi and Alex White, members of the band Fat White Family. They subsequently began collaborating on new material for Leonard's rebooted third record, also revisiting some of the pre-existing material from The Church Studios recording sessions. The trio then went into a studio in Friedrichshain. Leonard is cited as saying that the collaboration worked 'like a preordained happening' with 6 songs being written and recorded in under two weeks.

The third album, which ultimately went on to be titled The Golden Hour, was initially scheduled for release in Late 2021, but this was delayed due to the impact of the ongoing pandemic.

Leonard also stated that the initial draft his debut novel A Muse was completed in the winter of 2020 while he was living in Neukoln.

In July 2021, Leonard released a single titled 'Always Night'. This track was premiered via "Tim's Twitter Listening Party", a digital music programme hosted by Tim Burgess, vocalist for The Charlatans.

=== The Golden Hour and A Muse (2023–2025) ===
On 1 August 2023, Saint Leonard released 'Tell Me The Truth' as the first of three singles scheduled for release on consecutive full moons. This was followed by 'God Give Me Strength' on the Blue Moon of 31 August and 'Bells and Ecstasy' on the Blood Harvest Moon 29 September.

In support of these releases, Leonard played a London show at Third Man Records in Soho and then played two special shows with The Libertines, the first at The Cavern Club in Liverpool and the second in Milton Keynes.

In September 2024, Saint Leonard shared a picture of him signing a new record deal in the room in which Mozart was born in Salzburg.

In October, Saint Leonard released 'The Red Book', a seven minute single co-written with Brian Eno.

On 29 January 2025, Leonard released single 'Wits End' and announced his third album The Golden Hour was set to be released in April of that year.

In February, Saint Leonard opened for The Libertines on a sold out run of European tour dates.

The Golden Hour was released 18 April to considerable press attention and acclaim, with Clash Magazine calling the album "a bold, atmospheric song cycle", whilst The Spectator classed it simply as "a lovely album". Several reviewers drew attention to the album's stylistic similarities to David Bowie's Berlin Trilogy. The Arts Desk said The Golden Hour was "channelling the late great singer" and that "the album does well capturing that mood and place, as well as Leonard’s own emotional delivery, with songs to match". The Times also drew attention to the link between the two artists, by stating the album "has something of Bowie’s Berlin era to it. Stylish and Unusual”. Likewise, in a rare 10/10 rated review, Vice Magazine drew on the connection, saying “God Bless Kieran Saint Leonard, who’s doing all he can to bring David Bowie back from the dead... a 6D reincarnation of the thin white duke.”

Also in April, Leonard's debut novel A Muse was released via publishing house Hyperidean Press.

== Acting career ==
Leonard also had a brief acting career in the mid 2000s, appearing in the BBC TV series Casualty and Hustle.

== Notable appearances ==
- Feis Festival with Bob Dylan (2012)
- The Forum with The Libertines (2013)
- The Great Escape Festival Brighton Museum (2014)
- Standon Calling Festival Mainstage (2015)
- Hyde Park British Summertime with The Strokes and Beck (2015)
- Three Nights at Dublin's Vicar Street with Father John Misty (2018)
- All Points East festival with Patti Smith and Nick Cave (2018)
- Moth Club with Dave Grohl and Rick Astley (2019)

== Discography ==
=== Albums ===
- Out Of Work Astronaut (2012)
- Good Luck Everybody (2016)
- The Golden Hour (2025)

=== EPs ===
- Scapegoat (2009)

=== Singles ===
- Jerusalem (July 2012)
- Hipster Jesus (June 2013)
- Underwood Milk (June 2015)
- The Greatest Show on Earth (December 2015)
- Rise Up (October 2016)
- Little Girl Scientist (June 2017)
- Light Years (May 2019)
- Dark Miracles (June 2019)
- Always Night (July 2021)
- Soul Survivors (September 2022)
- Tell Me The Truth (August 2023)
- God Give Me Strength (August 2023)
- Bells And Ecstasy (September 2023)
- Threshold (February 2024)
- The Red Book (October 2024)
- Wits End (January 2025)
- Martini Symphony (April 2025)
