= Gora Padao =

- village
- Location in Uttarakhand, India Gora Padao (India)
- Coordinates: 29.13°N 79.31°E
- Country: India
- State: Uttarakhand
- District: Nainital

Languages
  - Official: Hindi
- Time zone: UTC+5:30 (IST)
- Vehicle registration: UK
- Website: uk.gov.in

Gora Padao is an Indian village 5 km south of Haldwani is named after a British camp/post at that location in the mid-19th century. In 1856, Henry Ramsay took over as the Commissioner of Kumaon.

The village population is about 5,000. The landmark of this village is 'Chandrawati Tewari Girls College' named after the aunt of Narayan Dutt Tiwari, one of the top political leaders of India and former Chief Minister of Uttarakhand. The oldest temple (100 years) in the village is Kali temple maintained by the Pandey family with the help of local people.

== Defence Agricultural Research Laboratory ==
Gora Padao is also known for the Defence Agricultural Research Laboratory run by Defence Research and Development Organisation (DRDO). The importance of high altitude agricultural research was realized when troops had to be deployed in high altitude and snow bound areas.

The first Prime Minister of India, Pt. Jawahar Lal Nehru wrote to the renowned botanist, the late Prof. Boshi Sen, then Director, Vivekanand Laboratory, Almora in January 1960. Realizing the indispensability of encompassing the diversified agro-ecological zones of Central Himalayas, field stations were opened in the remote border areas at Auli (3142 m) and Pithoragarh (1524 m) in April 1972 with the controlling office at Almora (1530 m). Another detachment was established at Harsil (3243 m) in May 1973 and transit base at Gora Padao (333 m) in June 1981 to provide logistic support for undertaking research work in difficult areas. The laboratory has successfully introduced hydroponics and established the greenhouse cultivation of vegetables and flowers in polar regions for the first time ever in the history of Indian Antarctic Expeditions.
