= Kasar Devi =

Human settlement in India

Coordinates: 29°38′30.2″N 79°39′42.4″E

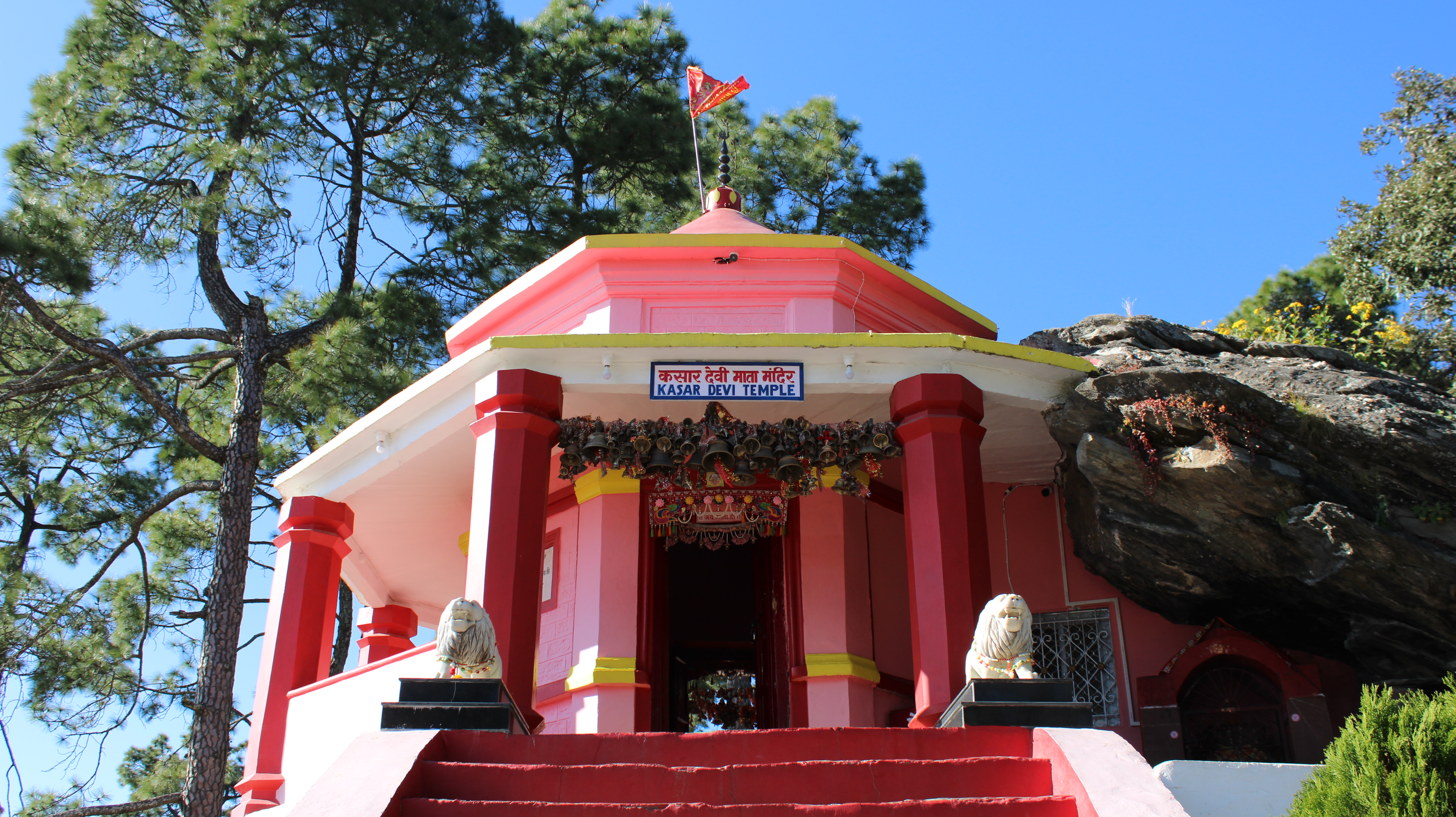
Mata Kasar Devi Temple Image Taken on November 13, 2022 Location Almora, Uttarakhand, India

Kasar Devi is a village near Almora, Uttarakhand, India. It is known for the Kasar Devi temple, a Devi temple, dedicated to Kasar Devi, an incarnation of Goddess Durga after whom the place is also named. The temple structure dates to the 2nd century CE.

The temple became famous after Swami Vivekananda visited Kasar Devi in 1890s, and numerous western seekers like Sunyata Baba Alfred Sorensen and Lama Anagarika Govinda.

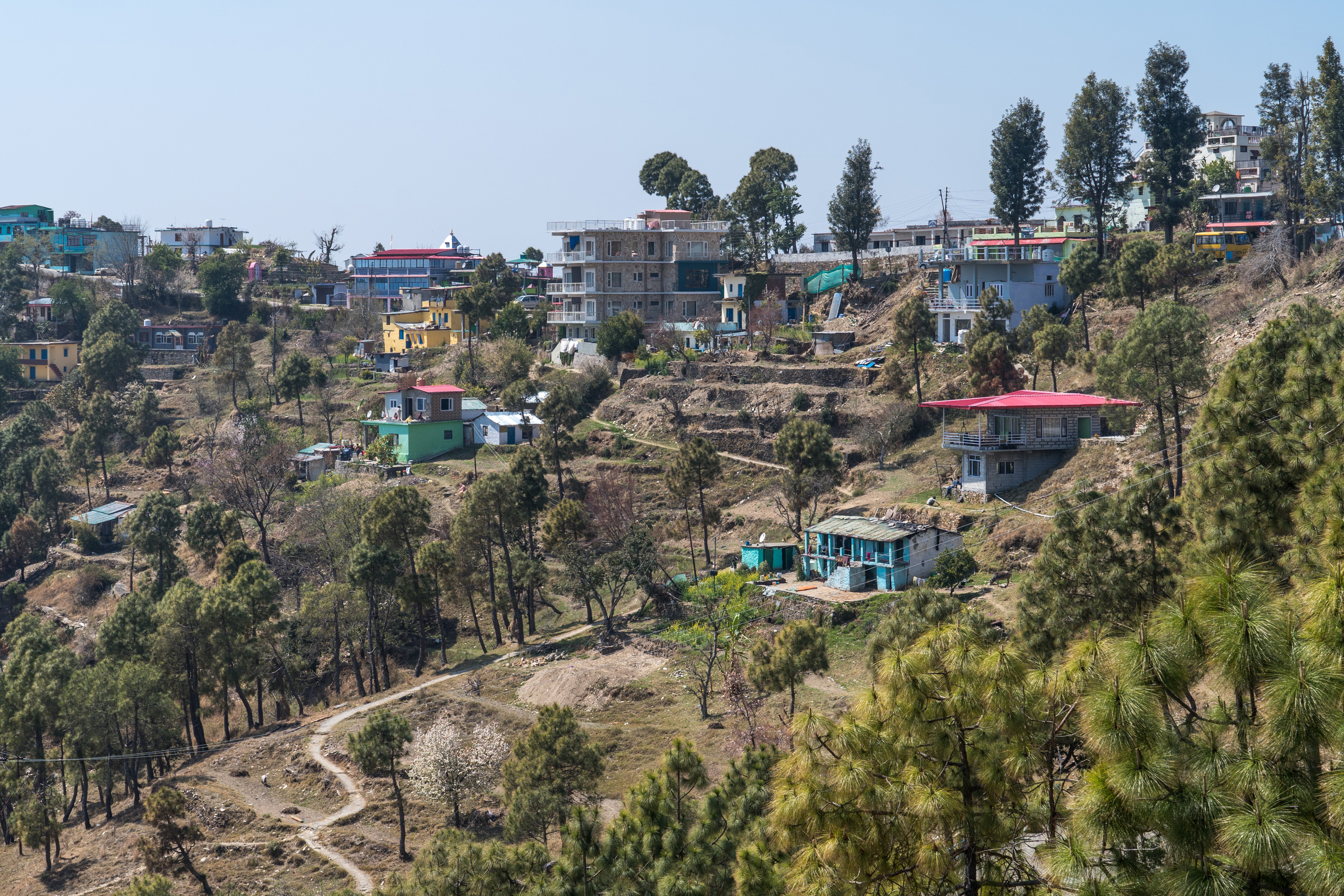
Kasar Devi Village

Also known as Hippie Hill or Crank's Ridge, Kasar Devi Temple complex has always been a melting pot of art, spiritualism and poetry. Singer Bob Dylan and actor Uma Thurman, have made this popular and today Kasar Devi continues to attract folks looking for answers to life's challenging questions.

The temple hosts the annual Kasar Devi Fair on Kartika Purnima (November–December).

== History ==
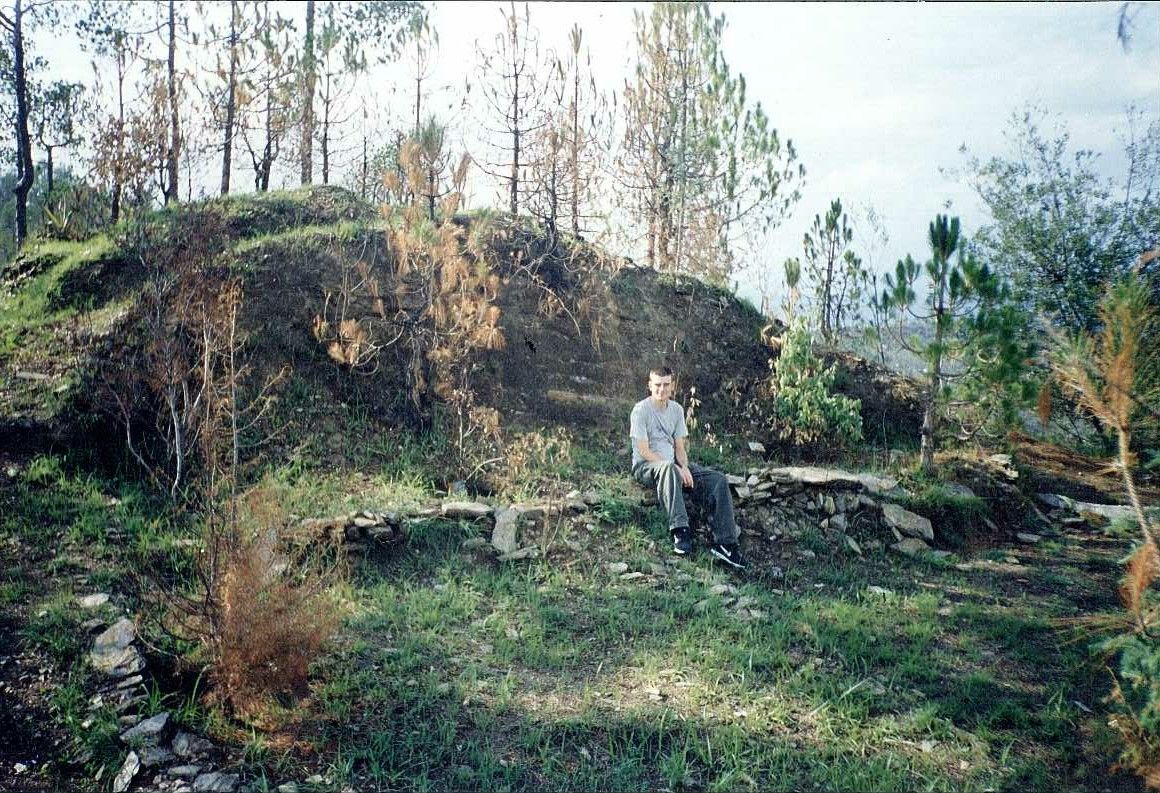
The remains of Sunyata's cave, near Crank's Ridge in 1999

Kasar Devi first became known when in the 1890s, Swami Vivekananda visited and meditated here and has mentioned his experience in his diaries.Walter Evans-Wentz, a pioneer in the study of Tibetan Buddhism, who later translated The Tibetan Book of the Dead, stayed here for some time.

Then in the 1930s, Danish mystic Sunyata Baba (Alfred Sorensen) came here and lived here for over three decades, as did Ernst Hoffman, who became Tibetan Buddhist Lama Anagarika Govinda and Li Goutami. This led to a series of spiritual seekers from the west, visiting them. In 1961, Govinda was visited by Beat poets, Allen Ginsberg, Peter Orlovsky and Gary Snyder. In later history, at the peak of the Hippie movement, the area also became a part of the Hippie trail. Crank's Ridge, colloquially known as Hippie Hill, which lies ahead of Kasar Devi became a popular destination. It became home to several bohemian artists, writers and western Tibetan Buddhists, and even visited by mystic-saint Anandamayi Ma. The ridge got its name amongst hippy circles, after American psychologist Timothy Leary streaked here in the 1960s. Leary wrote majority of his ‘psychedelic prayers’ here. Through the 1960 and 1970s, the area was visited by personalities of the counter-culture, George Harrison and Cat Stevens, Western Buddhist Robert Thurman, and writer D. H. Lawrence, who spent two summers here.

== Kasar Devi temple ==
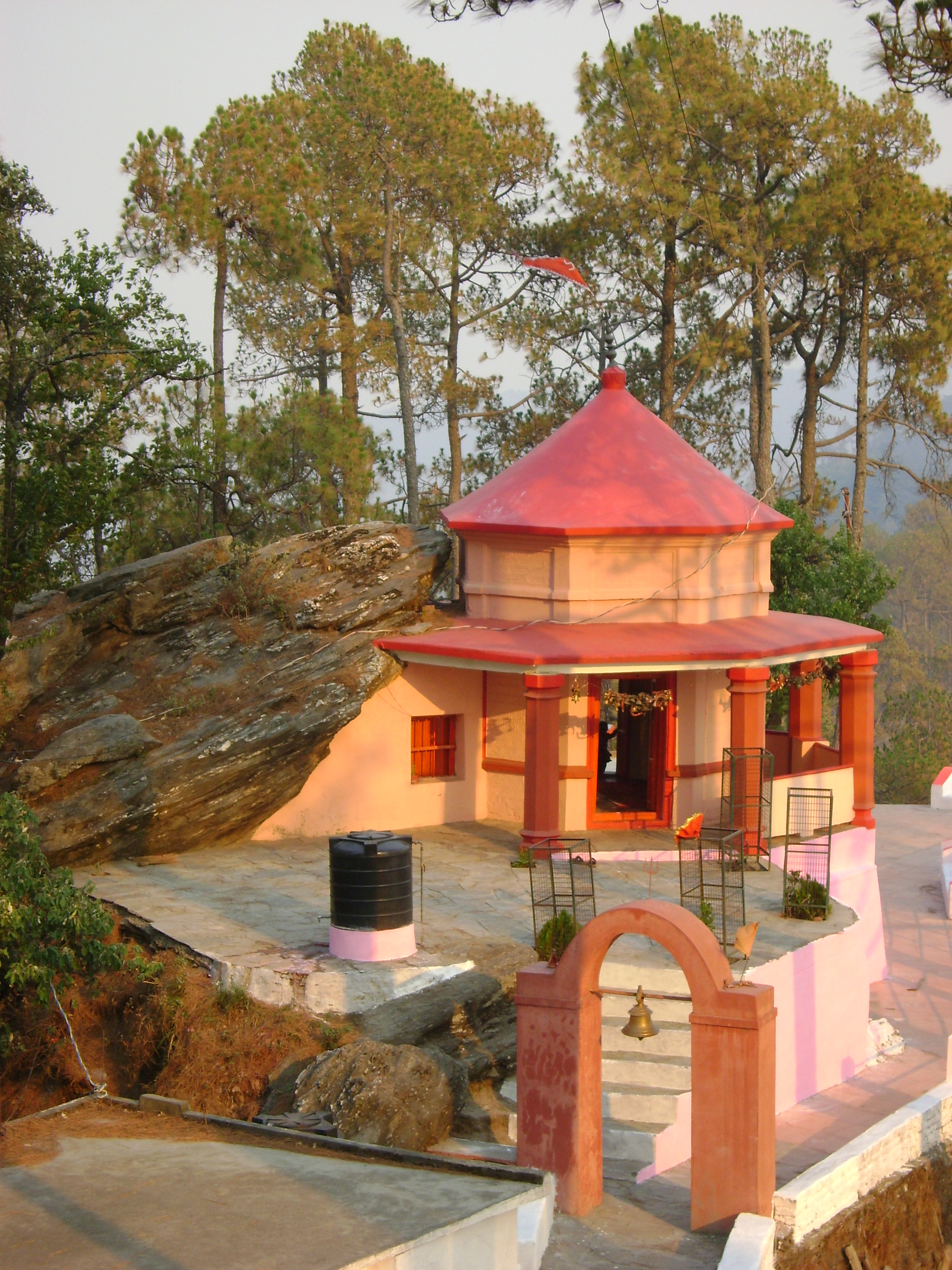
Kasar Devi Temple near Almora, Uttarakhand, India

The village is mainly known for the Kasar Devi temple, the 2nd century shrine dedicated to Kasar Devi, a form of Goddess Durga. The original temple was just a simple stone temple, and the current structure was built in 1948 by the Birla family. The temple complex consist of two different group of temples, one of devi and another of Lord Shiva and Bhairava. The main temple houses an akhand jyoti (eternal flame) which has been burning continuously for years. It also has a dhuni (havan kund) where wood log are burned 24 hours. The ash from the dhuni is said to be very powerful and has healing powers.

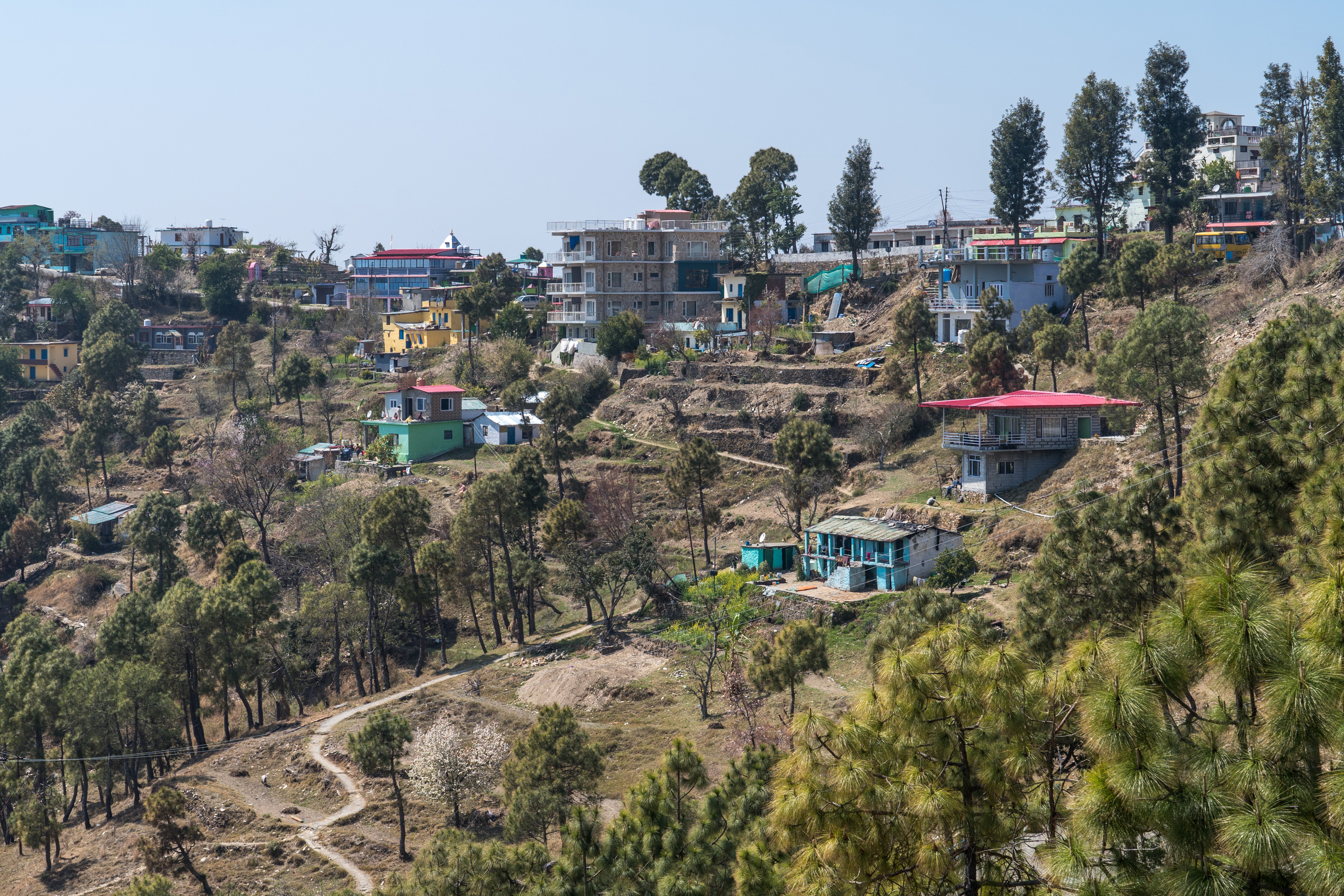
Kasar Devi Village

A winding walkway from gateway on the main road, right the beginning of the village, leads up to the temple.

The area is home to deodar and pine (Pinus roxburghii) forests. It also provides views not just of Almora and the Hawalbagh Valley, but also of the panoramic view of the Himalayas from Bandarpunch peak on the Himachal Pradesh border to Api Himal in Nepal.

A large fair, known as Kasar Devi Fair, is held at the Kasar Devi temple on the occasion of Kartik Poornima in the Hindu calendar, corresponding to November and December.

The Hill top provides beautiful scene of the valley and Himalayas that make it a place suitable for photography.

The main shrine of devi is situated inside a cave like formation by the huge rocks. City buses, taxies and cabs can take you there at suitable prices. But it can also be reached by hiking and trekking.

== Geomagnetic field and regional lore ==
The ridge surrounding the Kasar Devi temple, popularly known as "Crank's Ridge," has achieved notable contemporary exposure due to widespread claims of localized geomagnetic anomalies. Popular literature and regional tourism boards frequently assert that the site falls within a specialized geomagnetic zone under the direct impact of the Van Allen radiation belt, drawing comparisons to other historical sites like Machu Picchu in Peru and Stonehenge in the United Kingdom. According to these popular accounts, the NASA has allegedly documented a "dip" or "gap" in the radiation belts over the Kaashay hills, resulting in heightened cosmic energy or magnetic fields conducive to altered states of consciousness and deep meditation.

== Getting there ==
Kasar Devi is situated on a hilltop, on the edge of a ridge off the Almora-Bageshwar highway on the Kaashay hills of Kumaon Himalayas. As it is situated above the ridge of Almora town, it is accessible through eight-km hike from Almora or 10 km by road. One km away is the village of Kalimath, popular with tourists. Also close by is the Binsar Wildlife Sanctuary, 30 km away.
