= Henry Ramsay (Indian Army officer) =

General Sir Henry Ramsay KCSI CB
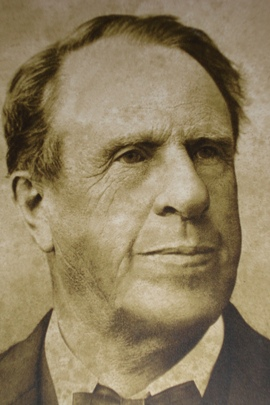
- Born: 25 August 1816
- Died: 16 December 1893 (aged 77)
- Allegiance: United Kingdom
- Branch: Bengal Army; British Indian Army
- Rank: General
- Awards: Knight Commander of the Order of the Star of India; Companion of the Order of the Bath

General the Hon. Sir Henry Ramsay KCSI CB (1816 – 16 December 1893) was a British general in the Indian Army, who served as Commissioner of the Kumaon division. He is regarded as one of the great soldier-administrators of British India and was dubbed "The King of Kumaon".

== Family ==
Ramsay was the son of Lieutenant-General the Hon. John Ramsay, fourth son of George Ramsay, 8th Earl of Dalhousie, and Mary Delise. His elder brother George was an admiral in the Royal Navy. Upon the death of his cousin, Fox Maule-Ramsay, 11th Earl of Dalhousie without issue in 1874, Queen Victoria issued a special allowance to allow Henry and his siblings the style and precedence as if their father had still been alive to inherit the earldom. Thus he was styled as The Honourable Henry Ramsey from 1874.

== Career ==
In 1840, Ramsay was appointed Assistant Commissioner of Kumaon, when a colonel in the Bengal Army. Ramsay was amongst the most able of the British officials posted to the Kumaon district and came to enjoy the respect and support of the people. His modest and genial approach ensured the region remained loyal to the British. In 1856 Ramsay became Commissioner and worked another 28 years in the Garhwal and Kumaon.

== Residences ==
The Commissioner was based in Almora, but moved the administration 23 km to the cooler Binsar during the summer. In 1866, Ramsay bought land measuring about 26 acres (110,000 m^{2}) at Binsar from Sri Jai Sah of Almora. It was known as Binsar Estate, situated in Pargana Baramandal District, Almora (formerly called Kumaon District), now a heritage property named Grand Oak Manor. Here he built his residential bungalow having a ballroom, a private chapel and staff quarters from which he used to administer the region. The civil and criminal courts were also held here. He also bought another property near Binsar known as 'Khali', meaning empty, where a bungalow was built along with orchards though he never lived there. Khali is now a resort. After retiring in 1884, Ramsay had hoped to live in Binsar, but had to return to England. In the 1930s Vijaya Lakshmi Pandit, Pandit Jawaharlal Nehru's sister lived in the house at Khali.

== Personal life and honours ==
For his services in the Kumaon Ramsay was appointed a Companion of the Order of the Bath (C.B.) in the 1860 Birthday Honours. He was invested as Knight Commander of the Order of the Star of India (K.C.S.I.) in the 1876 New Year Honours. According to P Whalley, "Henry Ramsay not only consolidated the earlier gains (of previous Kumaon Commissioners' Traill, Gardner, Batten & Lushington) but propelled Kumaon-Garwhal into the mainstream of modern India".

He married Laura Lushington (daughter of the previous Commissioner of the Kumaon) in 1850 and together they had five children. He died at Norwood on 16 December 1893 at the age of 77.

In his obituary in The Times, he was eulogised as "A man, keenly observant and sagacious, of cool, clear judgment and strong will, tempered by Scotch caution with a single-hearted desire for the well being and prosperity of the people over whom he was set in authority, he was trusted alike by them and by his official superiors."
