= Achsah Barlow Brewster =

American painter and writer (1879–1945)

Achsah Barlow Brewster (November 12, 1879 – February 16, 1945) was an American painter and writer, and wife of artist Earl Brewster (1878–1957). They are best known today for their close friendship with such prominent figures of the time as D. H. Lawrence, Willa Cather and the Nehru family.

Achsah Leona Barlow Brewster was born in 1878 in New Haven, Connecticut. After graduating from Smith College in 1902, she went to New York City where she studied art under Kenyon Cox, Arthur Wesley Dow, Walter A. Clark and Frank Vincent DuMond at the Art Students League and with Robert Henri at the New York School of Art. During 1906-07 she studied in France at the Institut des Beaux Arts and the studios of Lucien Simon and Castelluchio. She also visited art galleries in England, Belgium, the Netherlands and Italy. After returning to the United States, she spent three summers at the MacDowell Colony in New Hampshire.

In 1904 Achsah and Earl Brewster were introduced by the poet Vachel Lindsay after he noticed that Earl's imaginary portrait of a woman for a magazine cover closely resembled her. The Brewsters were married in 1910 and immediately moved to Italy. They never returned to the United States except for a short visit in 1923. They lived mostly in southern Italy but also spent time in France, Greece, and Ceylon (Sri Lanka). In 1935 they moved to a snowview estate above Almora, Uttar Pradesh, India, where they lived from 1935 until they died, Achsah in 1945 and Earl in 1957. They had one daughter, Harwood, who was born in 1912 in Paris and became the model for many of Achsah's paintings and the subject of her vivid memoir, The Child.

The Brewsters' art was influenced by Puvis de Chavannes, the Italian primitive painters and their own spirituality. Together they wrote L'oeuvre de E.H. et Achsah Barlow Brewster (1923), which explained their artistic principles, influences and goals. Subjects of Achsah's paintings included religious figures, children and local people in Ceylon. Her paintings were often large (sometimes murals). She used bright colors and often included flowers, animals and an imaginative touch. In Paris Maurice Denis and George Desvallières invited Achsah to join their Atelier d'Art Sacre, but she declined out of concern for maintaining artistic independence. Her work was exhibited in Paris at the Salon d'Automne, Galerie Cheron, the Salon des Societe des Artistes Independents and the Salon des Tuileries; in Rome at the Secessione and the Pincio Casino and in India at the Roerich Center of Art & Culture in Allahabad and at the Indian Society of Oriental Art in Calcutta. In India some of her paintings were bought to be displayed in public buildings. Recent exhibitions of the Brewsters' work were held in 2001 and in 2007–08 at ACA Galleries in New York City. Achsah's large Sermon on the Mount, a triptych, is still on view at St. Georges Church, Crecy-en-Brie, France. In 2008 her painting, Hamadryad, was acquired by the Telfair Museum of Art in Savannah, Georgia.

The Brewsters were remarkable in numbering among their circle of friends many prominent artistic, literary and political figures, including D.H. Lawrence and Willa Cather, both of whose writings they influenced, Elihu Vedder, Vachel Lindsay and three generations of the Nehru family. The Brewsters and Lawrences met on Capri in 1921 and maintained a close friendship and frequent correspondence. After Lawrence's death in 1930, the Brewsters compiled a book of his letters to them, with their memories of him. D.H. Lawrence: Reminiscences and Correspondence was published in 1934. Achsah also wrote many short stories and articles, including The Postmaster's Farewell and Ceylon the Luxuriant, which were published in Asia magazine. Her unpublished memoir, The Child, written in India during 1941–42, recounts the family's history during the seventeen years from Harwood's birth up to the time that she left for school in England in 1929.

The personal correspondence of Earl and Achsah Brewster as well as Achsah's The Child and a memoir by Harwood are housed at Drew University in Madison, New Jersey.

== Books/References ==
- Earl H. Brewster and Achsah Barlow Brewster. D.H. Lawrence: Reminiscences and Correspondence. London: Martin Seeker, 1938.
- Earl H. Brewster and Achsah Barlow Brewster. L'oeuvre de E.H. Brewster et Achsah Barlow Brewster: 32 reproductions en phototypie precedees d'essais auobiographiques. Rome: Valor Plastici, 1923.
- David Porter. "Life is very simple - all we need to do is our best"!: Willa Cather and the Brewsters, in Willa Cather: New Facts, New Glimpses, Revisions edited by John J. Murphy and Merrill Maguire Skaggs. Madison and Teaneck: Fairleigh Dickinson University Press.
- Lucy Marks and David Porter. Seeking Life Whole: Willa Cather and the Brewsters. Madison, NJ; Fairleigh Dickinson University Press, 2009.
- Mohindar Singh Randhawa. The Art of E.H. Brewster & Achsah Brewster. Allahabad: Kitabistan, 1944. ASIN: B0007KOZWG
- The Divinity That Stirs Within Us. Exhibition catalog. New York: Borghi, 1992.
- Divine Pursuit: The Spiritual Journey of Achsah and Earl Brewster. Exhibition catalog. New York: ACA Galleries, 2007.
