= Earl Brewster =

American painter and writer (1878–1957)

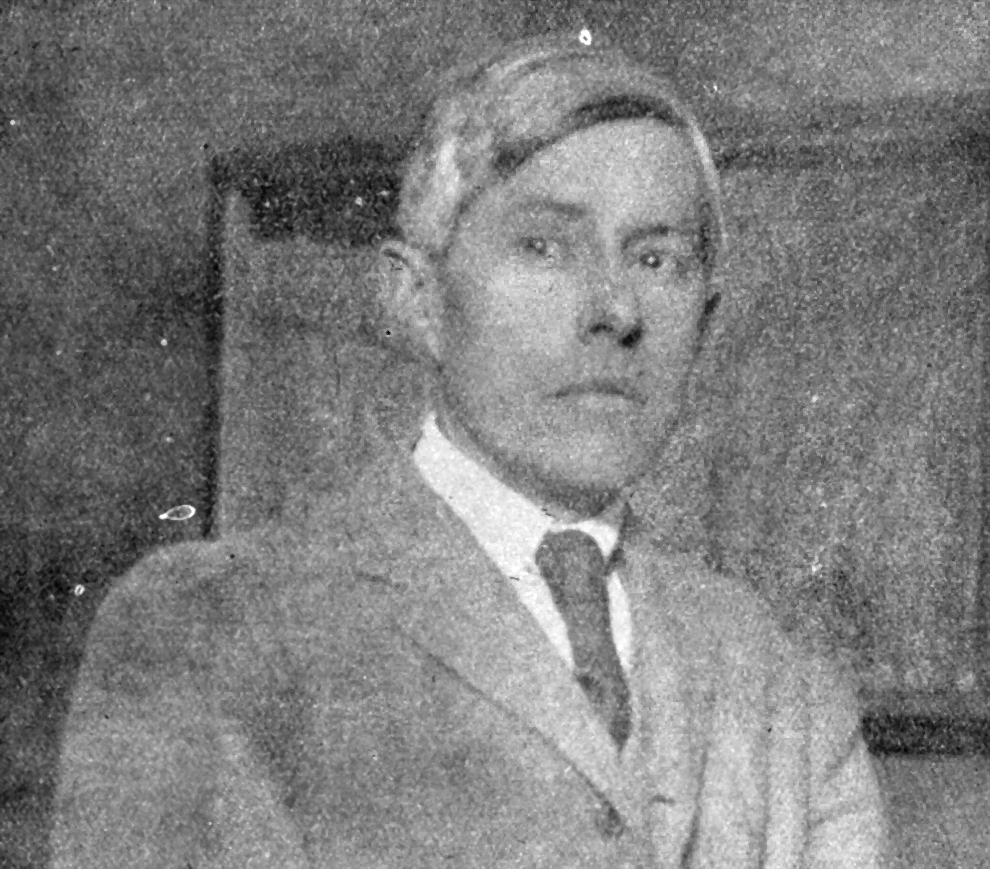
Earl H. Brewster ca. 1928.

Earl Henry Brewster (1878–1957) was an American painter, writer, and scholar, best known today for his close friendship with D. H. Lawrence, and for his compilation of the life of the Buddha, first published in 1926 and still in print.

== Early life ==
Brewster was born in Chagrin Falls, Ohio, in 1878.

== Education ==
After studying art at the Cleveland School of Art, he moved to New York, where he attended the Art Students League of New York and the New York School of Art, working with William Merritt Chase and Frank Vincent DuMond.

== Career ==
While living in New York, Brewster exhibited his paintings at the Pennsylvania Academy of Fine Arts, the Boston Art Club, the Corcoran Gallery of Art in Washington, D.C., and in New York City at the Society of American Artists' 28th Annual Exhibition, the National Academy of Design and the New York School of Art. One of his paintings, The Grey Harbor, was purchased by artist William Merritt Chase; another was later acquired by the Hillyer Gallery at Smith College.

In 1904 a fellow art student, the poet Vachel Lindsay, introduced Brewster to his future wife, Achsah Barlow, herself a painter, after noticing her resemblance to an imaginary portrait Earl had painted for a magazine cover. The two were married in 1910 and immediately moved to Italy. Except for a brief visit in 1923, they never again returned to the United States. Their daughter, Harwood, was born in Paris in 1912. The Brewsters spent nearly twenty years in southern Italy, with travels to Greece, France, Ceylon and India. After six years in southern France, they moved in 1935 to live at Snow View Estate Crank's Ridge in Almora, Uttarakhand, India.

Earl and Achsah Brewster's art was influenced chiefly by the mural paintings of Puvis de Chavannes and the Italian primitive painters. Their work exhibits a wide-ranging spirituality, encompassing Christian, Buddhist and Hindu subjects. Earl painted mostly landscapes, portraits, and religious scenes, as well as some abstract works. During their years in Italy, the Brewsters exhibited regularly at the Salon d'Automne and the Société des Artistes Indépendants. They also had shows at the Galerie Cheron and the Grand Palais in Paris, the Pincio Casino in Rome and with the Secessione in Rome. In 1923 they published L'oeuvre de E.H. et Achsah Barlow Brewster, which set forth their artistic principles, influences and goals. Earl's greatest artistic success came during his years in India, where more than a dozen of his paintings were purchased for public buildings. Copies of his statue of the Buddha were placed in several temples. In India their work was shown at the Indian Society of Oriental Art in Calcutta and at the Roerich Centre of Art and Culture in Allahabad. More recently, the ACA Galleries in New York held exhibitions of their paintings in 2001 and 2007–08. In 2008 Earl's landscape, The Gulf of Salerno, was acquired by the Telfair Museum of Art in Savannah, Ga.

The Brewsters were remarkable in numbering among their circle of friends many prominent artistic, literary and political figures, including D. H. Lawrence and Willa Cather, both of whose writings they influenced, Elihu Vedder, Vachel Lindsay and three generations of the Nehru family. The Brewsters and Lawrences met on Capri in 1921 and maintained a close friendship and frequent correspondence. Together Earl and Lawrence toured Etruscan sites and antiquities in 1927, which inspired Lawrence's Etruscan Places. After Lawrence's death, the Brewsters compiled a book of his letters to them, with their memories of him. D. H. Lawrence: Reminiscences and Correspondence was published in 1934. In India they became part of a distinguished community that included the Nehru family, dancer Uday Shankar (brother of Ravi Shankar), mystics and intellectuals. In 1947 Earl Brewster was honored to accept an invitation to raise the Indian flag at a celebration in Almora of India's independence.

Earl was interested in both Eastern and Western philosophy and religion, and after an early involvement with Theosophy, he followed first Buddhism and then Vedanta Hinduism, subjects of his numerous articles. At the suggestion of the English Buddhist scholar Caroline Rhys Davids, he published in 1926 The Life of Gotama the Buddha (Compiled Exclusively from the Pali Canon).

== Personal life ==
He was married to Achsah Barlow Brewster, also an artist.

The personal correspondence of Earl and Achsah Brewster, as well as memoirs by Achsah Brewster and Harwood Brewster Picard, are housed at Drew University, Madison, NJ.

== Books/References ==
- Achsah and Earl Brewster. D. H. Lawrence: Reminiscences and Correspondence. Martin Secker, London, 1934.
- Earl H. Brewster. The Life of Gotama the Buddha (Compiled Exclusively from the Pali Canon). Trubner's Oriental Series. London: Kegan Paul, 1926. ASIN: B001AFJL4A
- Earl H. Brewster and Achsah Barlow Brewster. L'Œuvre de E. H. Brewster et Achsah Barlow Brewster : 32 reproductions en phototypie précédées d'essais autobiographiques. Rome: Valori Plastici, 1923.
- Lucy Marks and David Porter. Seeking Life Whole: Willa Cather and the Brewsters. Madison, N.J.: Fairleigh Dickinson University Press, 2009.
- Mohindar Singh Randhawa. The Art of E.H. Brewster & Achsah Brewster. Kitabistan, 1944. ASIN: B0007K0ZWG
- The Divinity That Stirs Within Us. Exhibition catalog. New York: Borghi, 1992.
- Divine Pursuit: The Spiritual Journey of Achsah and Earl Brewster. Exhibition catalog. New York: ACA Galleries, 2007.
