= John Blofeld (writer) =

British writer (1913–1987)

John Eaton Calthorpe Blofeld (2 April 1913 – 7 June 1987) was a British writer on Asian thought and religion, especially Taoism and Chinese Buddhism.

== Early life ==
Blofeld was born in London in 1913. In his youth, he happened to come across a small statue of Gautama Buddha and, without knowing what it was, he felt a great passion to possess it, and then privately offered it flowers and prostrated before it every night. Experiences like this led Blofeld to believe in reincarnation, and that he had been a Buddhist in China in a previous life. He was educated at Haileybury College then Downing College, Cambridge, where he read natural sciences but did not complete his degree. Instead he left in his second year for travels to China. From 1932 to 1935 he lived in Hong Kong, teaching English at Munsang College in Kowloon and learning Cantonese. Then in the summer of 1935, he moved to China, having obtained a teaching position at the Hebei Academy of Industry in Tianjin, with a teaching schedule that would allow him to spend three nights a week in Beijing. Family matters called him back to England in the summer of 1937, so he was not present when the Japanese occupied northern China.

== War years and after ==
Returning to Hong Kong in September 1937, he mostly resided in and traveled around China until 1939, visiting monasteries and all the sacred mountains and talking to Mongolian lamas, Zen masters, Taoist sages, and others. He lived for some time in Peking, and traveled through Asia (Tibet, Mongolia, China, India, and Burma) to visit the places where those religions lived within their practitioners. He talked to Taoist eremites (hermits), spent time in monasteries and experienced how alive the spiritual culture of China was in this period. Blofeld became a pupil of Hsu Yun but actually received training in Chan meditation from Hsu Yun's pupils at a monastery near Kunming, Yunnan. He also received Vajrayana teachings.

Starting in 1937, he traveled around south China and southeast Asia, visiting Guilin, Hanoi, Kunming (where he spent ten months meditating in the Hua Ting monastery), and eventually returned to Hong Kong to resume teaching at Munsang College in Kai Tack Bund, Kowloon. But after several months there, he returned to England in 1939, to enroll in the School of Oriental and African Studies at the University of London, where he studied Chinese, Japanese, Korean, and Malay. His academic studies were again interrupted, this time by World War II. After one year of studies, he enlisted in counterintelligence (otherwise he would have been conscripted without a choice of which service to enter), and was soon promoted and sent to the British Embassy in Chongqing as cultural attache, on the basis of his proficiency in Chinese.

When the war ended, Blofeld returned to England and, in six months, received a master's degree in literature at the University of Cambridge. In 1946, he flew to Hebei. He had a Chinese National Government grant to study Tang dynasty Buddhism, and taught English at Shi Fan University.

Seeing that a Communist takeover was imminent, Blofeld fled Beijing with his pregnant wife. He then taught English in Hong Kong (1949–1951) and Chulalongkorn University in Bangkok (1951–1961). During these years he also visited Darjeeling to study with Nyingma teachers including Dudjom Rinpoche and Dodrupchen Rinpoche.

Blofeld worked for the United Nations (ECAFE, later ESCAP – Economic and Social Commission for Asia and the Pacific) (1961–1974), and then retired. In his later years, he conducted extensive lecture tours of America and Canada (1978–1980), and subsequently studied Chinese composition and literature.

His studies and his collected experiences with the sages and mystics of China are of special interest, because he entered this realm in an era before the Cultural Revolution which aimed at annihilating all ties to the old feudal Chinese identity.

His own view on the practices and beliefs he encountered was always marked by admiration of this lived spirituality. In the beginnings of his travels and studies, he was not very familiar with the native languages, and held a skeptical position against the shamanistic elements of those religions. But as his studies dove deeper into the complex symbolism of Asian thought, he developed a broader view, and became himself a deeply spiritual man. Blofeld mentored Red Pine in his translation work. According to Red Pine, Blofeld "was a very sincere Buddhist who practiced every night for several hours and loved what he did. I don't think he ever stopped learning."

== Personal life ==
Aged 34, Blofeld married Chang Mei-fang, of whom he wrote, "She was half Manchu and half Chinese... She was a woman of excellent character, intelligent and capable, but she was extremely argumentative! This goes to show that the old saying, 'Heaven punishes the guilty', is not just an empty slogan."

His first child was a son, named Ming Deh ("Bright Virtue"), born in Hong Kong the year Blofeld fled the Communist takeover of Beijing. A year later, his daughter, Shueh Chan ("Snow Beauty"), was born.

He died of cancer at age 74 in Bangkok, Thailand. His ashes occupy a place of honour in a Chinese Guan Yin temple he had helped build in 1951.

== Selected works ==
- The Huang Po Doctrine of Universal Mind – 1947, under pseudonym Chu Ch'an
- The Path to Sudden Attainment, a treatise of the Ch'an (Zen) school of Chinese Buddhism by Hui Hai[ar] of the T'ang Dynasty – 1948
- Some Hill Tribes of North Thailand – monograph in Orient Review and Literary Digest, Vol. 3, No. 1, January 1957. – Condensed from Journal of the Siam Society
- The Zen Teaching of Huang Po: On the Transmission of Mind – 1959
- City of Lingering Splendour : A Frank Account of Old Peking's Exotic Pleasures – 1961
- The Zen Teaching of Hui Hai – 1962
- I Ching, the Book of Change – 1968
- The Way of Power. A guide to Tantric mysticism of Tibet – 1970
- The Tantric Mysticism of Tibet : A Practical Guide to the Theory, Purpose, and Techniques of Tantric Meditation – 1970
- The Secret and Sublime: Taoist Mysteries and Magic – 1973
- Atisha: A biography of the renowned Buddhist sage – 1974, Translated by Thubten Kelsang Rinpoche and Ngodrub Paljor, with John Blofeld.
- Bodhisattva of Compassion : The Mystical Tradition of Kuan Yin – 1977
- The Jewel in the Lotus: An outline of present day Buddhism in China – 1977
- Mantras: Sacred Words of Power – 1977
- Wheel of Life : The Autobiography of a Western Buddhist, ISBN 0-87773-034-2, 1978
- Taoism: The Quest for Immortality – 1978
- Gateway to Wisdom: Taoist and Buddhist Contemplative Healing Yogas – 1979 -1980
- The Chinese Art of Tea – 1985
- My Journey in Mystic China: Old Pu's Travel Diary – 2008 (originally published in Chinese in 1990)
