= Alfred Sorensen =

Danish philosopher (1890–1984)

- Born: October 27, 1890; North Denmark
- Died: July 13, 1984 (aged 93); Fairfax, California, US
- Other names: Sunyata

Alfred Julius Emmanuel Sorensen (October 27, 1890 – August 13, 1984), also known as Sunyata, Shunya or Sunyabhai, was a Danish mystic, horticulturist and writer who lived in Europe, India and the US.

== Early life and background ==
Alfred Sorensen was the son of a peasant farmer near Aarhus in central Denmark. His formal education ended after the family sold their farm when Sorensen was 14 years old. Sorensen then worked as a gardener on estates in France, Italy and finally England.

In 1929, while working at Dartington Hall, near Totnes, Devon Sorensen met Rabindranath Tagore, the Indian Nobel Laureate poet. The two shared conversation and Sorensen introduced Tagore to gramophone recordings of Beethoven's Late Quartets, the poet then invited him to his newly created university, Shantiniketan in Bengal to 'teach silence'.

== India ==
For three years, from 1930 to 1933, Sorensen visited India and came to see the country as his home. After initially staying at Shantiniketan, he travelled around India visiting places of interest. In 1933, he returned to the west to tie up loose ends there, before heading back to India, where he would stay until the mid-1970s. When Sorensen returned to India, he started wearing Indian clothing, a style of dress he would continue for the rest of his life.

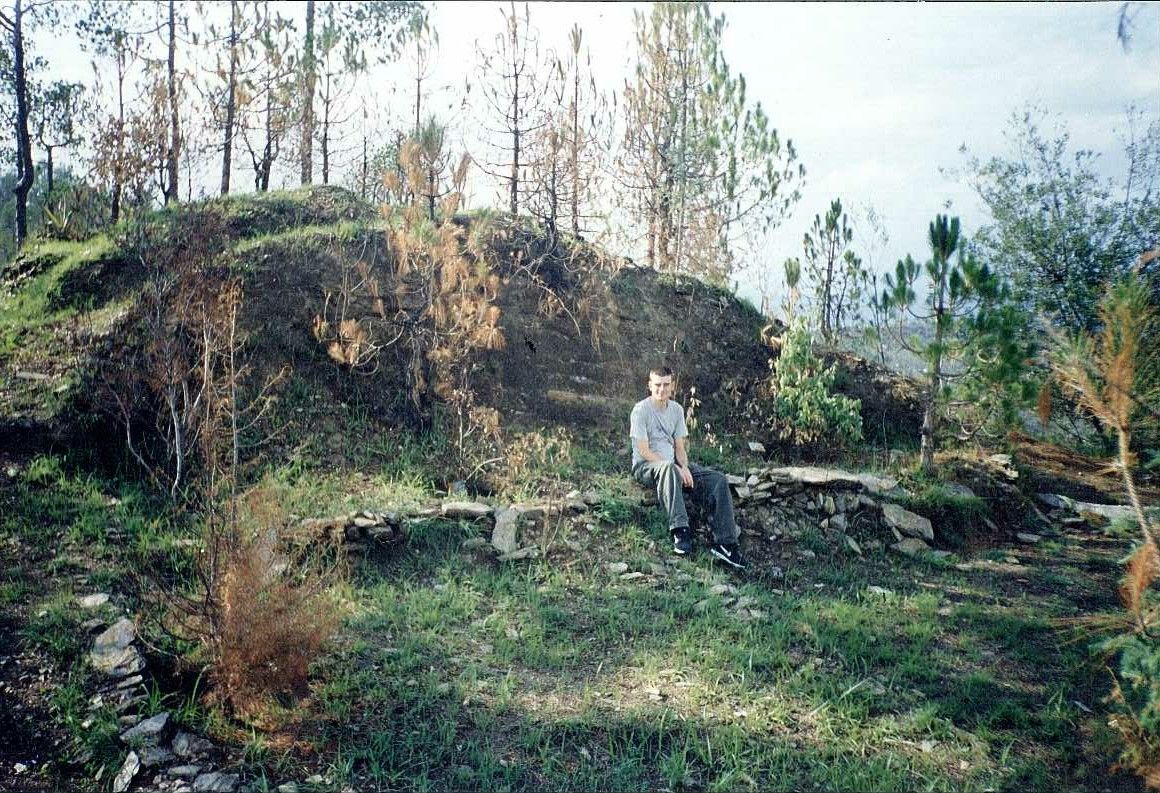
The remains of Sunyata's cave, near Crank's Ridge in 1999

Tagore had introduced Sorensen to Nehru, and in 1934, he visited the home of Nehru's sister and brother-in-law at their house Khali, Binsar where he stayed and used his horticultural skills in the garden, while still travelling during the summer. It was while staying with the Nehru family that one of their friends offered Sorensen a piece of land where he could live: Crank's Ridge, near Almora.

India's rich spiritual heritage provided a perfect environment for Sorensen's natural mystical attitude. During his first stay in the country, Sorensen had been initiated into Dhyāna Buddhism, but it was Ramana Maharshi who was to provide the biggest influence on his spiritual life. He had read Paul Brunton’s classic A Search in Secret India (1934), and soon after he met Brunton who arranged for Sorensen's first visit to Sri Ramana.

Sorensen made four trips to Tiruvannamalai ashram between 1936 and 1946, staying for a few weeks each time. It was during his visit to Sri Ramana that Paul Brunton told him that Ramana had referred to him as a ‘janam-siddha’ or rare born mystic.

A profound experience occurred to Sorensen while he was on his third visit to Sri Ramana in 1940: "Suddenly, out of the pure akasha and living Silence, there sounded upon Emmanuel [his preferred name for himself] these five words ‘We are always aware, Sunyata!’" Sorensen took these five words to be a mantra, initiation and name. He would use the name Sunyata, or subtle variations on it for the rest of his life.

Although Sorensen, or Sunyata, as he came to be known for the last forty four years of his life, kept his Almora hut as his base he would continue to travel around India visiting friends and ashrams, especially during the cold, Himalayan winter months. Sunyata met many prominent spiritual teachers in addition to Ramana Maharshi, including Anandamayee Ma, Yashoda Ma (Mirtola), Swami Ramdas, Baba Hari Dass, and Neem Karoli Baba.

Sunyata lived in India as a sadhu or ascetic, subsisting on donations. Although in 1950 he accepted half of a grant of 100 Rs a month offered to him by the Birla Foundation, a charitable body. He subsisted on this goodwill and the vegetables he grew in his garden until he moved to California a quarter of a century later.

From at least the 1930s, Sunyata wrote diaries and reflections. His writing used a highly idiosyncratic, playful language to express the spiritual concepts that he focused on. He often combined English and Sanskrit, used obscure literary terms or invented his own words. In 1945 he wrote Memory, an autobiography, which is the core of Sunyata – The life and sayings of a rare-born mystic. Sunyata continued to write throughout his life and another collection of his writings is collected in Dancing with the Void. He acquired Indian citizenship in 1953.

== United States ==
In 1973, members of the Alan Watts Society travelled to India after Watts' death. They dropped in on Sunyata and were impressed by his spiritual understanding. One of the group told him "You'll be in California next year." To which Sunyata replied "But I have nothing to teach and nothing to sell." To which he was told "That's why we want you." Sunyata flew to the US for a four-month trip from late 1974 to early 1975.

In 1978, the Alan Watts Society arranged for a final permanent move to California where he lived until his death in 1984. While in America Sunyata held weekly meetings at Alan Watts' houseboat SS Vallejo, where he would answer questions from visitors.

== Death ==
On August 5, 1984, Sunyata was hit by a car when crossing the road in Fairfax, California and died eight days later.

== Teachings ==
Although Sunyata denied that he had a 'teaching', he expounded an Advaitic world view and maintained that he had always known "the source and I are one". Like Ramana Maharshi, Sunyata regarded silence both as the highest teaching and "the esoteric heart of all religions". Silence for Sunyata was the stilling of desires, effort, willfulness and memories.

Sunyata coined words himself to convey some of his more unusual perceptions. Innerstand meant an intuitive comprehension that did not involve the intellect or effort, while headucation was mental conditioning. Those of us who falsely identified with our individuality he referred to as egojies (-ji is an honorific suffix used in India) and he was fond of the Japanese Zen term Ji Ji Muge, meaning the interdependence of all things.

Sunyata's understanding of his essential nature was condensed in the word Mu, a Chinese term similar to the Sanskrit term Sunyata, which he used both in reference to himself and as an exclamation.

== Writings ==
- Sunyata, the life and sayings of a rare-born mystic. Ed. Betty Camhi and Elliott Isenberg. North Atlantic Books ISBN 1-55643-096-5.
- Dancing with the Void. Ed Betty Camhi and Gurubaksh Rai. Blue Dove Press ISBN 1-884997-19-8

== Works involving Sorensen ==
- Eating The "I": An Account of the Fourth Way: The Way of Transformation in Ordinary Life by William Patrick Patterson, Ed. Barbara C Allen ISBN 978-1-879514-77-5
- Teachers of No-Thing & Nothing – Eating The "I" Parts II & III by William Patrick Patterson, ISBN 978-1-879514-30-0
- The Book of Enlightened Masters: Western Teachers in eastern traditions, by Andrew Rawlinson. Open Court, 1997. ISBN 0-8126-9310-8
