= Buddhism in Hungary =

Buddhism in Hungary has existed since 1951 when Ernő Hetényi founded the Buddhist Mission in Germany, as a member of the Arya Maitreya Mandala Buddhist order (Mahayana school). However, the first Buddhist community had been founded in the 1890s in Máramarossziget (today Sighetu Marmației, part of Romania). József Hollósy took refuge and wrote Buddhista Kátét ("Buddhist Catechism") (1893) — the first Buddhist catechism in Hungarian. According to this, the Dharma has been present in Hungary for more than a century. In 1933 the Hungarian philologist and Orientalist — author of the first Tibetan-English dictionary and grammar book Sándor Kőrösi Csoma — was recognised as a bodhisattva in Japan. In Hungary József Hollósy is regarded as the second bodhisattva.

In Hungary Buddhism has several forms, all of them with their own independent schools of thought. The different organisations coexist fairly harmoniously, but active communication between them is rather feeble.

Officially seven stupas have been inaugurated in Hungary: two in Budapest, and one in Budakeszi, Bükkmogyorósd (Csernely), Zalaszántó, Tar, and Becskén. The Peace Stupa in Zalaszántó is the biggest Buddhist shrine in Europe with a 30-meter height and 24-meter width.

Hungary has a Buddhist college named Dharma Gate Buddhist College in Budapest.

== History ==
=== Beginning ===
Route travelled by Körösi Csoma

The ancient religion of Hungarian tribes was shamanism, but presumably some had come across Buddhism during their westward migration and some of them had probably adopted Buddhism as their religion. Due to the religious tolerance of Buddhism it was possible to practice two or more traditions at the same time, as was the case for Tibetan and Mongolian tribes. In the 15th century a Geleotti, humanist philosopher, fleeing the inquisition, found refuge at the court of Matthias Corvinus, king of Hungary. Galeotti called the Buddha an "Indian sage" and he thought that the capital of the country, Buda was named after him.

Sándor Kőrösi Csoma, in the hope of finding the ancient homeland of the Hungarians, wanted to travel to India via Afghanistan, and further on to Mongolia via Tibet. Eventually he reached Ladakh in Northern India. During this period at Zanskar — Csoma was the first European to visit the valley — he was immersed in an intense sixteen-month study of the Tibetan language and the Indo-Tibetan Buddhism at the core of its literature, with a local lama, Sangs-rgyas-phun-tshogs. He was one of the first Europeans to master the Tibetan language and read two of the great encyclopaedias of Indo-Tibetan Buddhist literature, the Kangyur (100 volumes) and the bsTan-'gyur (224 volumes), which contained translations of Buddhist books brought from India. Kőrösi Csoma was given the title of bodhisattva in Tokyo in 1933 at the Taishyo Buddhist University as Csoma Bosatsu.

=== After Kőrösi Csoma ===
Buddhism appeared first in Hungary in the end of the 1890s, when József Hollósy, brother of painter Simon Hollósy, took refuge and wrote Buddhista Káté (1893).

László Mednyánszky was working on the sketches of the Arrival of the Hungarians, painting of Árpád Feszty, in Máramarossziget. József Hollósy lead a Buddhist circle which became a great influence for Mednyánszky. As a result, he dedicated the rest of his life to Buddhism. Mednyánszky was the first Hungarian artist to represent Buddhism with his choice of colours and themes. There was another Buddhist community in Budapest between 1931 and 1935. The main figures were László Vágó wholesaler and Tibor Boromisza painter. Their seals represented Buddha under a székely gate (ornate door) surrounded by an epigraph: „Magyar Buddhisták” (Hungarian Buddhists).

Writer Géza Gárdonyi also believed in reincarnation and there was a time when he wanted to convert to Buddhism.

The first official Sangha in Hungary was founded in 1951-ben by Ernő Hetényi who was ordained in Germany in 1938. The actual date of the foundation of the Hungarian Buddhist Mission is 18 February 1952. Arya Maitreya Mandala German Buddhist order was founded by Lama Anagarika Govinda, German traveller, philosopher, painter, and poet. This order belongs to Mahayana and its rites follow the Tibetan tradition. Ernő Hetényi was the third person who graduated from this order. In 1956 the Buddhist Mission was declared Eastern European centre to promote Buddhism in the neighbouring countries. The mission aimed at representing all Buddhist schools without partiality. The foundation of Kőrösi Csoma Sándor International Buddhology Institute in Berlin was aimed to achieve the same goal. During his eastern travels Hetényi visited monasteries in India, Mongolia, Buryatia, and Laos. He received empowerment from Tibetan and Mongolian lamas and in 1982 he was blessed by the 14th Dalai Lama whom he met three times.

In 1990, due to several issues, the Kőrösi Csoma Sándor Institute was closed, but later, two great historical figures of Hungarian Buddhism, Dobosy Antal and Takács László, reorganised and reopened it. After this Buddhist orders and schools were open throughout the country. The sudden liberty and the large number of institutions also involved some degree of drop in quality. New books appeared which were mainly translations from English. A large part of the works of Sándor Kőrösi Csoma remain untranslated to this day.

== Places ==
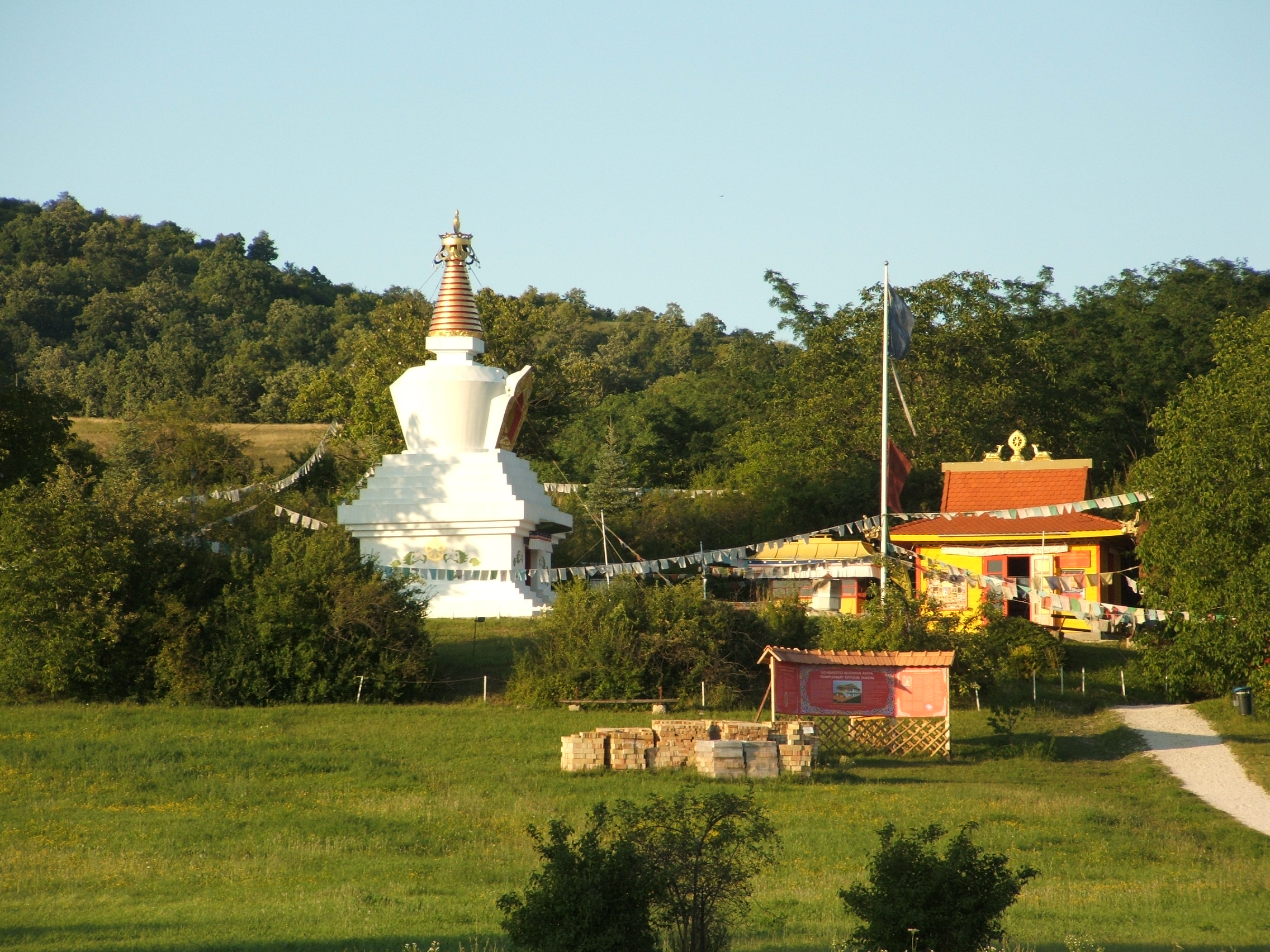
Sándor Kőrösi Csoma stupa in Tar village.

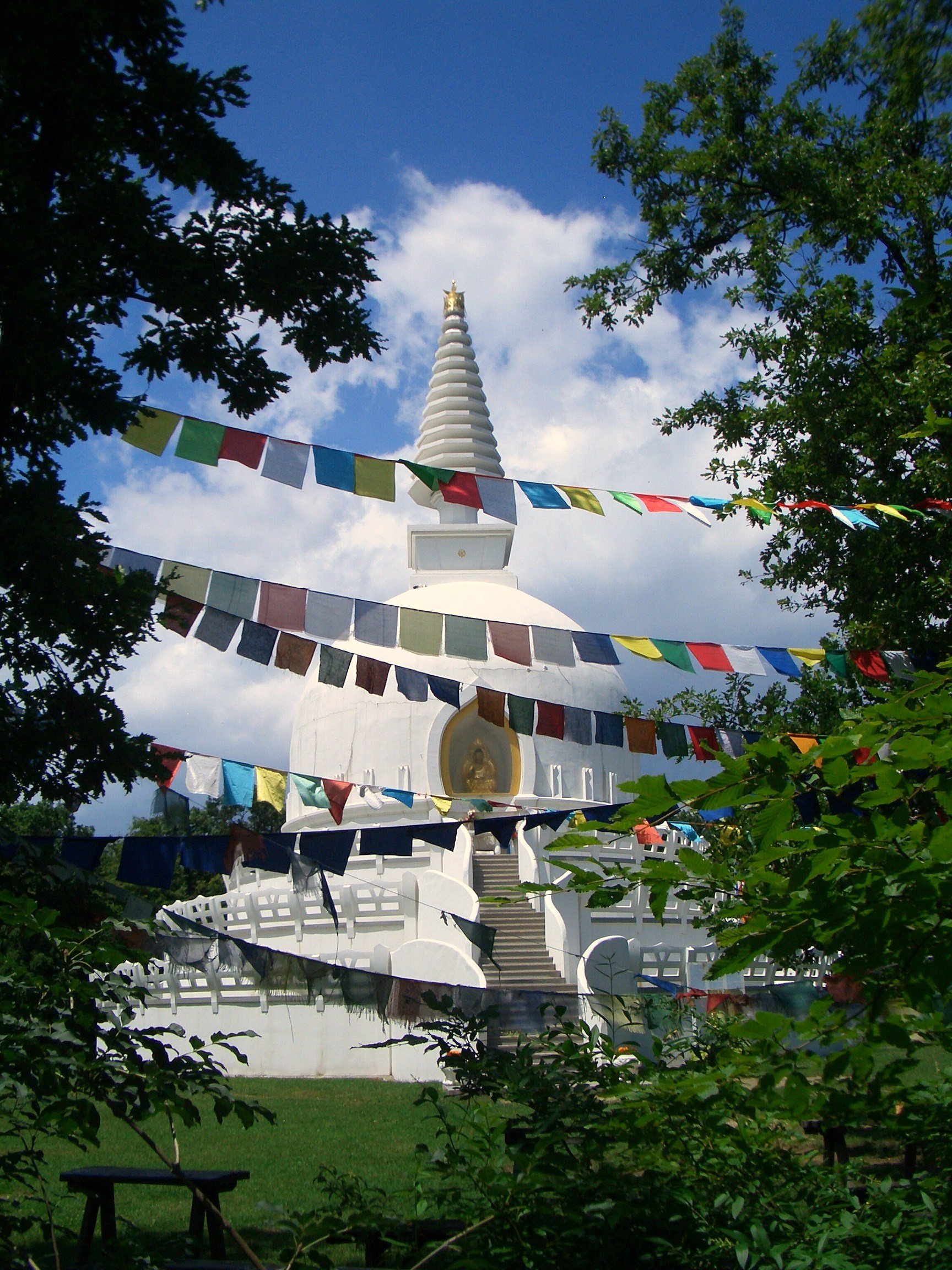
The 33-meter-high stupa in Zalaszántó

There are seven stupas in Hungary so far: two in Budapest, and one in Budakeszi, Bükkmogyorósd (Csernely), Zalaszántó, Tar, and Becske. Three of them can be visited freely for the public: the one in Zalaszántó (the biggest, in Zala County), the one in Tar and the newest one in Becske (these later two in Nógrád County); two out of the other four are in Budapest, one in Budakeszi, and near Bükkmogyorósd, in Úszón (Borsod-Abaúj-Zemplén County). Furthermore, there is a stupa in Biri, Szabolcs-Szatmár-Bereg County which was built in 2010.

The Hoboji Zen Temple is in Pilisszentlászló, Von Kvang Sza International Zen Temple is near Esztergom, and Mokusho Zen House is in Szombathely.

Bu Yi Temple in the 15th district of Budapest is the first temple of the Chan Buddhists of the Hungarian Chinese.

Dhammadipa Monastery is in Bajna village in a small valley, along the road between Bajna and Epöl.

== Visits of the 14th Dalai Lama in Hungary ==
The 14th Dalai Lama, Tenzin Gyatso has visited Hungary seven times. First in 1982, then in 1990, 1992, 1993, 1996, 2000, and 2010. His first visit was during his travel to Rome (to meet Pope John Paul II) on 26 September 1982. He spent the night in the guest house of government of the Hungarian People's Republic. He was welcomed on behalf of the government by József Marjai, chief prime minister of Hungary. At the airport waiting lounge he met the Mongolian ambassador, and Ernő Hetényi, founder and leader of the Hungarian Buddhist Mission. The Dalai Lama was invited by several Hungarian Buddhist institutions and he paid a visit to Hungary between 25 and 30 April 1990. During his stay he gave Chenrezig empowerment at the Marx Károly University of Economics (today Corvinus University of Budapest), and he gave sermon in St. Stephen's Basilica together with Cardinal László Paskai and other representatives of the historically important churches. Between 20 and 25 July 1992 he paid visit to Hungary for the invitation of Csan Buddhist Church amongst others. His public speech in Budapest Sportcsarnok was attended by 4000 people, his teaching at Corvinus University of Budapest was also great success amongst the students. He also travelled to Tar village to give his blessings to a newly built 13-meter-high stupa dedicated to the 150th anniversary of the death of Sándor Kőrösi Csoma. One year later the Dalai Lama consecrated the 36-meter-high stupa in Zalaszántó which became the highest such building in Europe. The Dalai Lama visited Hungary on 27 and 28 October 1996 and he met several politicians, religious leaders, scientists and artists. He signed the Proclamation of Planetary Mind. He gave a public speech in the Congressional Centre of Builders. In October 2000 the Dalai Lama was invited by Central European University and Tibetet Segítő Társaság. This time he met Viktor Orbán, prime minister of Hungary. First day he had a press conference and he introduced his new book in Libri Book Palace. The next two days he gave teaching and public speech in Budapest Sportcsarnok. On 14 October he met Asztrik Várszegi abbot of Pannonhalma Archabbey and he also gave a speech. In 2010 he gave a teaching for more than ten thousand people in Budapest. Gábor Demszky mayor of Budapest gave him Honorary citizenship of the city.

== Roma Buddhists ==
They are a big minority of Romani people in Hungary who adopted Theravada Buddhism, they belong to the Dalit Buddhist movement of B.R. Ambedkar, and are believed to be descendants of Chandala who left Bihar in 400-500 AD, also the Bihar County and Hajdú-Bihar County in Hungary, as János Bihari named after their Homeland Bihar state in India.

== Media ==
=== Radio ===
The first official broadcast of Buddha FM radio, the first Buddhist on-line radio channel of Hungary, was at 6 am on 22 September 2014. Founders of the radio are all the Hungarian Buddhist communities, members, students, and teachers of the Dharma Gate Buddhist College.

== Buddhist communities, organisations, and schools ==
Buddhist communities in alphabetical order:

=== Mahayana ===
- Dharma Gate Buddhist Church (1991) – a unity of five Buddhist communities
- Dharma Gate Buddhist College (1991)
- Đại Bi tự (大悲寺, 2018)

=== Theravada ===
- Vipassana Hungary
- Buddhist Vipassana Party

=== Tibetan buddhism ===
- Diamond way Buddhist Community – Láma Ole Nydahl
- Dharmaling Hungarian Tibetan Buddhist Community (1989) – Shenphen Rinpoche Lama
- Kamala Buddhist Community (2003) – Shamar Rinpoche
- Khyenkong Karma Tharjay Buddhist Community (2007)
- Hungarian Árya Maitreya Mandala Community – Buddhist Mission
- Hungarian Dzogcsen Community (2012)
- Hungarian Karma-Kagyüpa Buddhist Community, Karma Ratna Dargye Ling (1987)
- Hungarian Nyingmapa Community (1991)
- Mahá Maitrí Buddhist Community and Consultation Service
- Maitreya Buddhist Martian Art Association Non-profit Unity (1992)
- Mantra Hungarian Buddhist Church – Nepal-Bhutan Buddhist Drukpa Kagyü community
- Sakya Tashi Chöling Buddhist Community (1986)
- Sangye Menlai Gedün, Healing Buddha Community
- Part To Help Tibet – Shambhala Tibet Centre (1994)

=== Zen ===
- One Drop Sanhga Hungary (2000) – Japanese Zen
- Kvan Um Zen Hungary (1989) – Korean Zen
- Original Light Zen Community and Church(2011) – Korean Zen
- Hungarian Chinese Chan Buddhist Church (2003) – Chinese Zen (Chan)
- Mokusho Zen House – Taisendji Temple (2002) – Japanese Zen
- Dharma Gate Zen Community (1992) – Korean Zen

== Famous Hungarian Buddhists ==
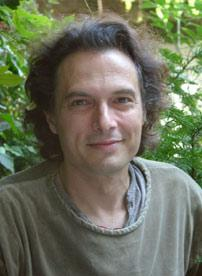
András Laár

- Anita Ábel – actress, tv personality
- Zoltán Bereczki – actor, singer, music producer
- Éva Csepregi – singer, actress, member of Neoton Família
- János Kulka – Kossuth Prize and Jászai Mari Prize winner actor
- András Laár – humorist, poet, composer, actor, Buddhist teacher
- László Mednyánszky – painter
- Kristof Steiner – journalist, actor
- Dóra Szinetár – actress, singer
- Gábor Terebess – writer, translator, ceramist, book designer, orientalist

== See also ==
- Religion in Hungary
- Buddhism by country
