= Zsóka Gelle =

Hungarian Tibetologist, translator, writer, filmmaker and guide

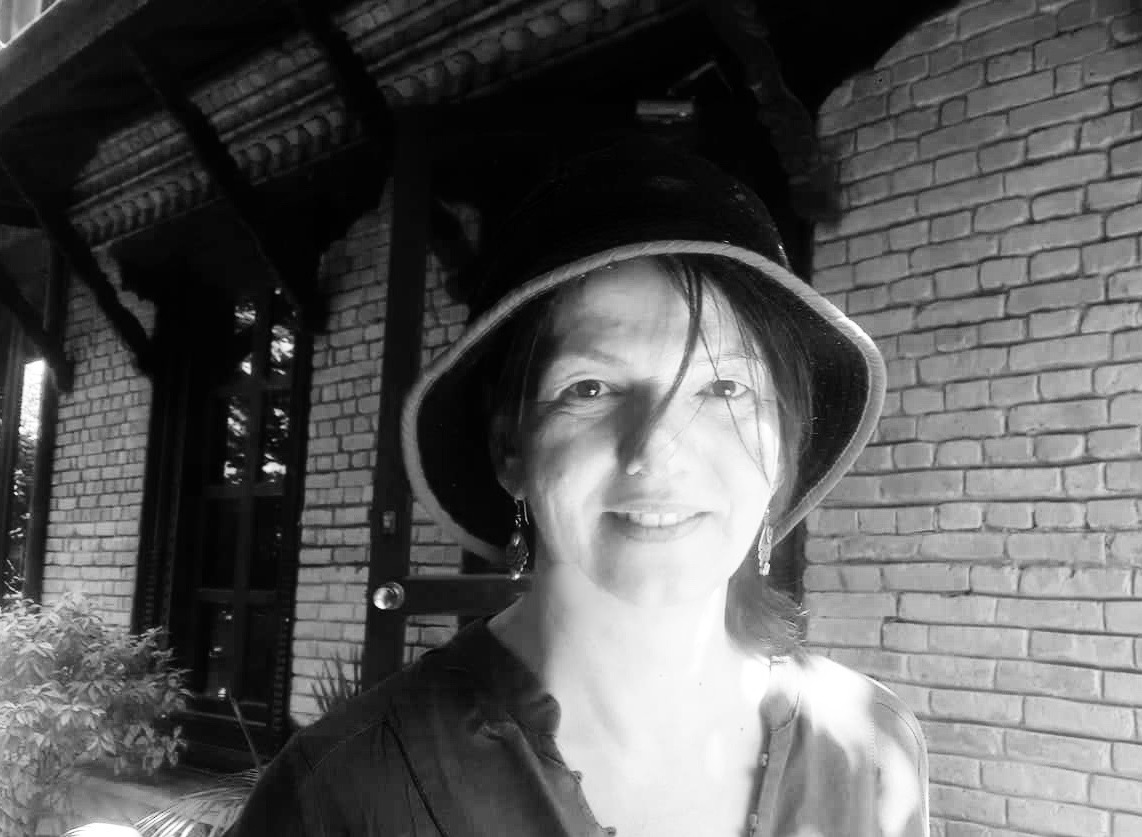
- Zsoka Gelle in Kathmandu, Nepal in 2018
- Born: October 12, 1967 (age 58); Szombathely, Hungary
- Other names: བསྟན་འཛིན་བཟང་མོ་
- Occupations: tibetologist, translator, writer, filmmaker, guide
- Known for: Mani Lama Project, Hyolmo Heritage Project
- Website: www.zsokagelle.com

Zsóka Gelle (born October 12, 1967) is a Hungarian Tibetologist, translator, writer, filmmaker and guide.

== Career ==
Gelle was born in Szombathely, Hungary. She lived and worked in Asia for several years. After graduating in History and Cultural Management at BDTF College, Szombathely in 1990, and in Tibetan Studies at Eötvös Loránd University (ELTE), Budapest in 1995, she worked as an office manager at Tibet House Foundation, and as a lecturer at ELTE University and Dharma Gate Buddhist College. She did her colloquial Tibetan Studies in Darjeeling at the Manjushree Institute in 2005-2006, and was a member of the Doctoral College for Himalayan Cultural Transfer and Cross-Contacts in the Himalayan Borderlands at the University of Vienna between 2011 and 2014. She worked as a Khyentse Fellow at ELTE University, Budapest at the Institute of Far Eastern Studies between 2014-2016. She taught the following subjects: Tibetan literature, Tibetan canonical literature, Tibetan religion in practice, Civilized Shamans, sacred space and pilgrimage, and sacred places of Buddhism. Among her responsibilities was to organize lectures and conferences about Buddhism, to invite foreign scholars and promote research on Buddhism.

She has a broad interest in the field of Tibetan and Buddhist studies, Himalayan religious practices, rituals, ritual texts, mountain cult, pilgrimage, and Asian performing arts. Her main areas of interest are the teaching lineages of the Nyingma school, gter ma tradition, Himalayan hidden lands (beyul), Buddhist eschatology, and Hyolmo tradition.

Between 1999 and 2003 she worked with some of the last Tibetan storytellers in India, Mani Lamas, who used to recite stories with painted scrolls to spread the teaching of compassion and popularize the Chenrezi cult, and the use of its mantra, Om mani padme hum. Gelle traveled widely in India to find traces of this storytelling tradition, and meet its representatives, the buchens of Spiti; Buchen Gyurme, one of the last active mani lamas living in Dekyiling that time; and Buchen Norgye in Kollegal, South India. She was one of the main contributors of the exhibition "Demons and Protectors" organized by the Ferenc Hopp Museum of Eastern Asiatic Arts in 2003.

Her other major project started in 2011, when she became a member of the Doctoral College for Himalayan Cultural Transfer and Cross-Contacts on the Himalayan Borderlands at the University of Vienna, Austria to conduct research on Hyolmo history and tradition. When the earthquake hit Nepal in 2015, most of the Hyolmo villages were destroyed, and she started the Hyolmo Heritage Project to preserve Hyolmo tradition and create a platform where memories can be shared.

Presently, she is working as a freelance translator and independent researcher, writing contributions for museum catalogues, project publications and conference proceedings.

== Publications ==
=== Publications in English ===
- Gelle, Zs. 2003. The Masters of Mani mantra. In: Demons and Protectors. Budapest: Ferenc Hopp Museum of Eastern Asiatic Arts
- Gelle, Zs. 2010. Ratnabhadra`s Lifestory – *The Origin of a Tibetan Narrative Tradition – In Memoriam Buchen Gyurme, 1930-2004. In: Buddhism in the 21st century. Korea: IV. Lay Buddhist Forum (published in English and Korean)
- Gelle, Zs. 2012. Masters of the Mani Mantra – A Tibetan Narrative Tradition and Its Indian Parallels. In: Buddhism in East Asia. Delhi: Vidyanidhi Prakashan
- Gelle, Zs. 2014. Hidden Lands in the Himalaya – Notes on a story of Buddhist eschatology and Himalayan migration (web publication by SOAS, London)
- Gelle, Zs. 2017. Sa bdag, gzhi bdag, yul lha. In: Encyclopedy of Buddhism. V ol. 4. Mythology. Leiden: Brill (print in progress)
- Gelle, Zs. 2017. A Treasure Text on the Age of Decline: Authorship and Authenticity in Tibetan Prophetic Literature. In: The Words of the Buddha. Kyoto: Otani University. (print in progress)
- Gelle, Zs. 2017. Treasure Texts on the Age of Decline: Prophecies concerning the Hidden Land of Yolmo, their reception and impact. In: Making Ends Meet. Wien: Österreichische Akademie der Wissenschaften (print in progress)

=== Publications in Hungarian ===
- Gelle, Zs. 2002. Tibet – Mítosz és valóság. Kisebbségkutatás. Budapest: MTA 2002: 11/3 (Tibet – Myth and Reality) Minority Studies and Reviews. Budapest: Hungarian Academy of Sciences
- Gelle, Zs. 2003. A mani mantra mesterei. In: Démonok és megmentők. Budapest: Hopp Ferenc Kelet-Ázsiai Múzeum (The Masters of Mani Mantra)
- Gelle, Zs. 2005. Kunga Rangdöl alászállása a poklok birodalmába – Egy tibeti delog beszámolója. In: Emlékkönyv Kara György Professzor 70. születésnapjára. Budapest: ELTE (Kunga Rangdol’s Journey into Hell – An Account of a Tibetan Delog)
- Gelle, Zs. 2006. A mani thangkáról és indiai előzményeiről. Keletkutatás. Budapest: ELTE (The Tibetan Narrative Thangka and Its Indian Genesis)
- Gelle, Zs. 2009. Ratnabhadra életrajza – Buchen Gyurme emlékére. Keletkutatás. Budapest: ELTE (Ratnabhadra’s Namthar)
- Gelle, Zs. 2010. Mo – Tibeti jóslás. In: Démonok és védelmezők – Őseink nyomában. Budapest: ELTE (Mo – Tibetan Divination)
- Gelle, Zs. 2012. Kolostori tánc Tibetben. Keréknyomok. Budapest: TKBF (Monastic Dance in Tibet)
- Gelle, Zs. 2015. Jolmó maṇḍala – Horváth Z. Zoltán emlékére. Keréknyomok. Budapest: TKBF (Yolmo Maṇḍala – In Memoriam Horváth Z. Zoltán)
- Gelle, Zs. 2015. Gter ma a hanyatlás koráról. Szerzőség és hitelesség kérdése egy tibeti szöveg kapcsán. In: Kéklő hegyek alatt lótuszok tava – Tanulmányok Bethlenfalvy Géza tiszteletére. Budapest: L’Harmattan (Gter ma on the Age of Decline – Notes on Authorship and Authenticity)
- Gelle, Zs. 2017. Ama Jangri, a sárkányon lovagló dákiní – Hegykultusz a nepáli Himalájában. In: Szent hegyek, szent emberek. Budapest: Buddhizmus-kutatás Központ (Ama Yangri, the Dakini Riding on a Dragon – A Mountain Cult in the Nepali Himalaya)
- Gelle, Zs. 2018. A belső démonok és az “elvágás” (csö) tibeti gyakorlata. In: A köztes lét túloldalán. Hajas Tibor művészete és a tibeti misztériumok. Budapest: Hopp Ferenc Kelet-Ázsiai Múzeum (Inner Demons and the Tibetan Practice of „Cutting” (gcod))
- Gelle, Zs. 2018. A bódhnáthi sztúpa története tibeti források tükrében. In: Orpheus Noster 11/3. Budapest: Károli Gáspár Református Egyetem (The History of the Bodhnath Stupa)
