= Dharma Gate Buddhist Church =

Hungarian religious organization

- A Tan Kapuja Buddhista Egyház
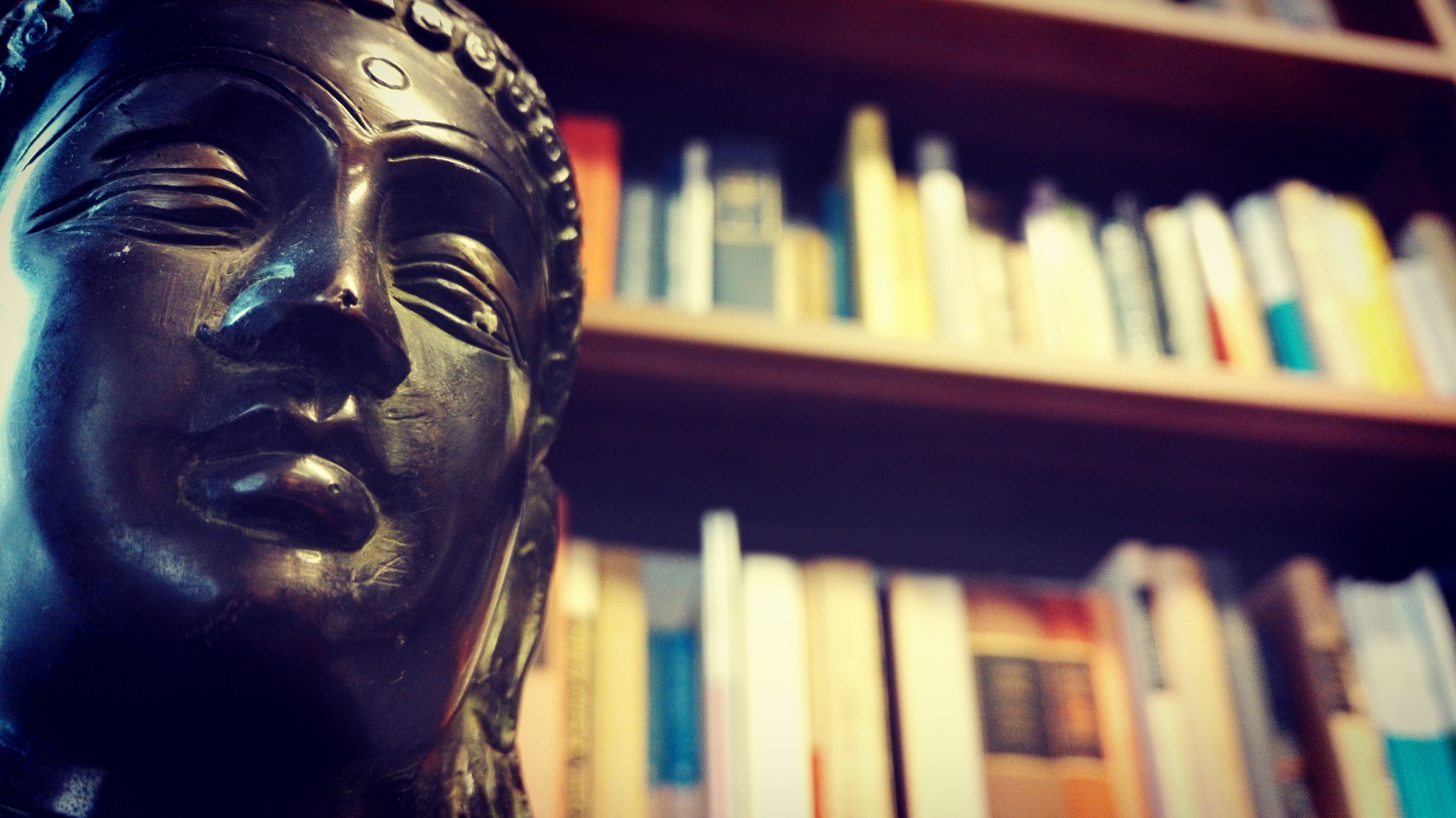
- Theology: Buddhism
- Language: Hungarian, Pali, Sanskrit, Tibetan, Chinese, Japanese
- Territory: Hungary
- Founder: László Mireisz
- Origin: 1991; Budapest, Hungary
- Number of followers: 30,000

The Dharma Gate Buddhist Church (Hungarian: A Tan Kapuja Buddhista Egyház) is one of the official Buddhist organizations in Hungary. It was established in May 1991 as an umbrella organization for several Buddhist communities and traditions in the country.

== History ==
The Dharma Gate Buddhist Church was founded on 27 May 1991 by 108 founding members representing five Buddhist communities. The Church was officially registered later that summer. Its establishment aimed to create a pluralistic, ecumenical Buddhist institution in Hungary, welcoming all Buddhist schools and traditions.

Shortly after its foundation, the Church established the Dharma Gate Buddhist College (DGBC, Hungarian: A Tan Kapuja Buddhista Főiskola), which became the first state-accredited Buddhist college in Central Europe. The college offers undergraduate and graduate programs in Buddhist studies and is a central institution for Buddhist education in Hungary.

== Organization and Activities ==
The Dharma Gate Buddhist Church operates as an umbrella organization, uniting various Buddhist communities, including Theravāda, Mahāyāna, and Vajrayāna traditions. The Church is governed by an ecclesiastical council, with leadership positions elected from among the member communities.

The Church organizes regular teachings, meditation sessions, cultural events, and festivals, including the annual Maitreya Festival at the winter solstice.

== Dharma Gate Buddhist College ==
The Dharma Gate Buddhist College is the educational arm of the Church, founded in 1991. The college offers accredited bachelor's and master's degrees in Buddhist studies. Its curriculum covers the history, philosophy, and practice of various Buddhist traditions, as well as related Eastern philosophies such as Hinduism and Taoism.

The college is notable for its open, non-sectarian approach, allowing students to study and practice multiple Buddhist traditions. The institution also participates in the Erasmus+ program, enabling student and staff exchanges with partner universities across Europe.

== International Relations ==
The Dharma Gate Buddhist Church is a member of the European Buddhist Union and collaborates with Buddhist organizations and educational institutions internationally. The college regularly hosts international conferences and maintains academic partnerships with universities in Europe and Asia.

== See also ==
- Dharma Gate Buddhist College
- Dharma Gate Buddhist High School
- Manfa Retreat Center and Creative Space
- Buddhism in Hungary

== Further information ==
- Dharma Gate Buddhist Church official website
- Digital version of the book A Tan Kapuja Buddhista Egyház 25 éve (Publisher: A Tan Kapuja, 2016)
- TanKapu 30; ed. Géza Rába; Dharma Gate Buddhist Church – Dharma Gate Buddhist College, Budapest, 2021
