= Hetény =

Hetény may refer to:

- Hungarian name of Chotín, now Slovakia
- Hungarian name of Hetin, now in Serbia
- Hosszúhetény (means "long Hetény")

== See also ==
- Hetényi
