= Arya Maitreya Mandala =

- Formation: 1933
- Founder: Anagarika Govinda
- Type: Tibetan Buddhism; Western Buddhism
- Headquarters: Stückelhäldenstr 9, 75175 Pforzheim, Germany
- Acarya: Volker Zotz
- Website: arya-maitreya-mandala.org

Arya Maitreya Mandala is a tantric and Buddhist order founded in 1933 by Lama Anagarika Govinda.

== History ==
Lama Anagarika Govinda founded the Arya Maitreya Mandala order on 14 October 1933 and made fourteen Indian scholars members. The order's activities concentrated on India until 1952 Phue-Tuê, a Buddhist monk from Hanoi, and the German author Hans-Ulrich Rieker (1920–1979), set up branches of the order in Eastern Asia and in Europe. During the following decades the Arya Maitreya Mandala established branches in Vietnam, Singapore, Germany, Belgium, The Netherlands, England, Austria and the United States of America. In Hungary Ernő Hetényi became the leader of the order's Eastern European branch. In 1982 Govinda appointed as his successor Karl-Heinz Gottmann who became the head (Acharya) of the Arya Maitreya Mandala. In 1999 Armin Gottmann became the Acarya. He is currently the spiritual leader of the worldwide Arya Maitreya Mandala. Beside him leading members of the order are Austrian philosopher Volker Zotz and Robert Janssen, a clinical psychologist and indologist from Amsterdam.

== Philosophy ==
The order's foundation was inspired by a Lama of the Gelugpa Tradition, Lama Ngawang Kalsang (aka Tomo Geshe Rinpoche), who was Lama Govinda's teacher. Lama Ngawang Kalsang saw the future Buddha Maitreya as a model for modern spirituality.

== Sources ==
- Hellmuth Hecker, Lebensbilder Deutscher Buddhisten Band I: Die Gründer. Konstanz, 1990, 2. verb. Aufl. Verlag Beyerlein-Steinschulte, Stammbach, ISBN 978-3-931095-57-4 (pp. 84–115)
- Birgit Zotz, 'Tibetische Mystik: nach Lama Anagarika Govinda Lama Anagarika Govinda'
- Martin Baumann: Der buddhistische Orden Arya Maitreya Mandala. Religionswissenschaftliche Darstellung einer westlich-buddhistischen Gemeinschaft. Religionen vor Ort - Bd. 3. Marburg 1994, ISBN 3-9802994-4-9
