= Hans-Ulrich Rieker =

- Born: 1 February 1920; Germany
- Died: 26 October 1979 (aged 59)
- Known for: The Secret of Meditation

Hans-Ulrich Rieker (1 February 1920 – 26 October 1979) was a German actor, author, and leader of the Buddhist religious order Arya Maitreya Mandala in Europe.

== Life ==
Rieker initially worked as a stage actor in classical theatre roles. Deeply affected by Buddhism, he was ordained a novice monk in the Berlin Buddhist Temple in 1950. As a Buddhist mendicant monk, he then wandered around India on foot, where in 1951 he encountered the German-born Buddhist Lama Anagarika Govinda who became his main teacher. Govinda initiated Rieker into the order he founded in 1933, Arya Maitreya Mandala. In 1952 Rieker founded the European branch of the Arya Maitreya Mandala on behalf of his teacher and accepted Harry Pieper and Lionel Stützer as its first members. He built up the order in Europe and headed this branch for twelve years until progressive deafness caused him to withdraw from public life. His successor as head of the western branch of the order was Karl-Heinz Gottmann.

== Journalism and public activity ==
Rieker gave radio lectures on RIAS on topics of Buddhism as well as Indian and Chinese philosophy. He submitted numerous articles and several books on these subjects. Rieker founded the magazine Der Kreis together with Wilhelm A. Rink. After training in India, he worked as a yoga teacher. His books on Buddhism, yoga and meditation contributed to the growing interest in these subjects in Germany in the 1950s and 1960s. Rieker's literary merits in conveying the authentic tradition of classical yoga were recognized in India, for example by the yoga guru B. K. S. Iyengar.

== Works ==
- Das Geheimnis der Meditation. Rascher Verlag, Zürich 1953; new edition 2006 (Wishbohn Verlag): ISBN 978-3-9809647-8-4

The Secret of Meditation, Rider & Co., 1974.

- Die zwölf Tempel des Geistes. Weisheit und Technik der Yogasysteme. Rascher Verlag, Zürich 1955.
- Das klassische Yoga-Lehrbuch Indiens. Hatha Yoga Pradipika. Rascher Verlag, Zürich 1957.

The Yoga of Light: Hatha Yoga Pradipika, trans. Elsy Becherer, George Allen & Unwin, 1972

- Bettler unter Toten. Ein buddhistischer Bettelmönch in Indien. Rascher Verlag, Zürich 1958.

Beggar Among the Dead: Some Experiences of a Buddhist Monk in India, Rider & Co., 1960.

- Ich lerne Yoga. Fackelverlag, Stuttgart 1959.
- Meditation. Übungen zur Selbstgestaltung. Rascher Verlag, Zürich 1962.

== Sources ==
- Christian Fuchs: Yoga in Deutschland. Rezeption – Organisation – Typologie. Kohlhammer Verlag, Stuttgart 1990, ISBN 978-3-17-011016-8.
- Hellmuth Hecker: Lebensbilder deutscher Buddhisten. Ein bio-bibliographisches Handbuch. Volume II: Die Nachfolger. Universität Konstanz Forschungsberichte, 1992.
- Volker Zotz: "Bleibt Philosophen, solange ihr es wollt!" Die Anfänge des Ārya Maitreya Maṇḍala in Europa. In: Derselbe (Hrsg.): Schnittstellen. Buddhistische Begegnungen mit Schamanismus und westlicher Kultur. Festschrift für Armin Gottmann zum 70. Geburtstag. Luxemburg: Kairos Edition 2013 (ISBN 978-2-919771-04-2), pp. 153–176
