= Sándor Kőrösi Csoma =

Hungarian linguist and orientalist (1784–1842)

Alexander Csoma de Kőrös
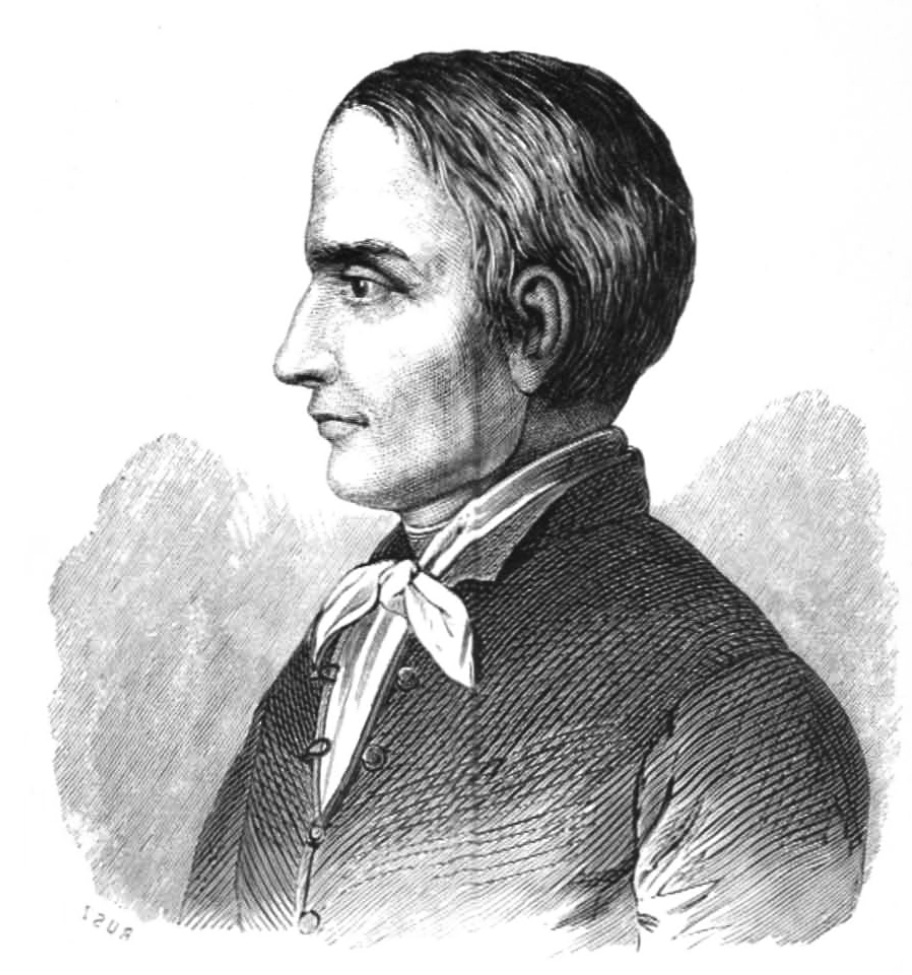
- Born: Sándor Csoma; 27 March 1784; Kőrös, Grand Principality of Transylvania (today part of Covasna, Romania)
- Died: 11 April 1842 (aged 58); Darjeeling, Colonial India
- Occupations: Linguist; philologist; traveller

Sándor Csoma de Kőrös (Hungarian: [ˈʃaːndor ˈkøːrøʃi ˈt͡ʃomɒ]; born Sándor Csoma; 27 March 1784/8 – 11 April 1842) was a Hungarian philologist and Orientalist, author of the first Tibetan–English dictionary and grammar book. He was called Phyi-glin-gi-grwa-pa in Tibetan, meaning "the foreign pupil", and was declared a bosatsu or bodhisattva by the Japanese in 1933. He was born in Kőrös, Grand Principality of Transylvania (today part of Covasna, Romania). His birth date is often given as 4 April, although this is actually his baptism day and the year of his birth is debated by some authors who put it at 1787 or 1788 rather than 1784. The Magyar ethnic group, the Székelys, to which he belonged believed that they were derived from a branch of Attila's Huns who had settled in Transylvania in the fifth century. Hoping to study the claim and to find the place of origin of the Székelys and the Magyars by studying language kinship, he set off to Asia in 1820 and spent his lifetime studying the Tibetan language and Buddhist philosophy. Csoma de Kőrös is considered as the founder of Tibetology. He was said to have been able to read in seventeen languages. He died in Darjeeling while attempting to make a trip to Lhasa in 1842 and a memorial was erected in his honour by the Asiatic Society of Bengal.

== Biography ==
=== Youth in Transylvania ===
Csoma de Kőrös was born into a poor Székely family, the sixth child of András Csoma and his wife, Krisztina Getse (or Ilona Göcz?). His name in English would be written Alexander Csoma of Koros and in Hungarian Kőrösi Csoma Sándor where Kőrösi means "of Koros" (i.e., a praedicatum of nobility) and alternate continental forms include "Sándor Csoma de Koros". His father served with the Székely Border Guards. His early schooling was at the local village school. In 1799, he went to Nagyenyed (present-day Aiud) to join the boarding school Bethlen Kollégium. The education program was free (gratistae) in return for manual labor. Here he was influenced by the professor Samuel Hegedüs. He left the school in 1807 and continued university studies, taking an interest in history, a subject made popular by Professor Ádám Herepei. In 1815 he passed the public rigorosum in his studies at Bethlen Kollégium. A scholarship allowed him to continue to Göttingen, where he began to learn English under Professor Fiorillo. Csoma de Kőrős also came under the influence of Professor Johann Gottfried Eichhorn.

=== Studies in Göttingen ===
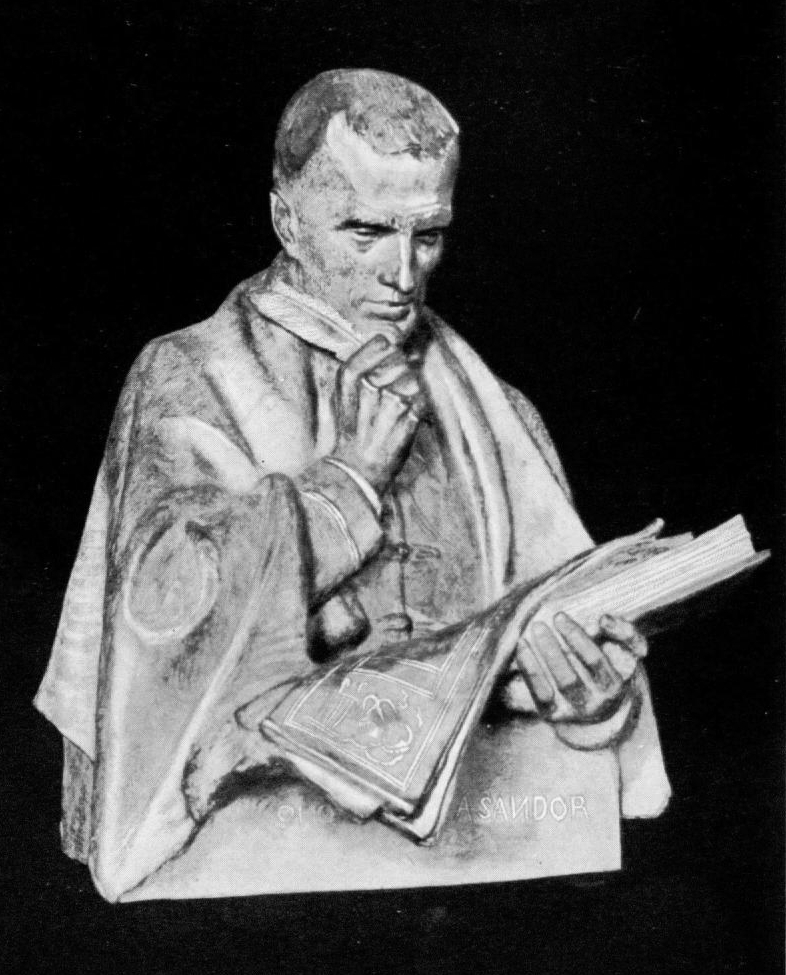
Bust presented by the Hungarian Academy of Sciences to the Asiatic Society of Bengal

Between 1816 and 1818 he studied Oriental languages. In Göttingen, he was noted for being literate in thirteen languages including Latin, Greek, Hebrew, French, German, and Romanian apart from his native Hungarian. In his Calcutta years he also mastered Bengali, Marathi and Sanskrit. He returned to Transylvania in 1818. On 7 February 1819, Csoma met Hegedűs and informed him of his intent to learn Slavonic in Croatia. He left on foot for Agram and spent a few months there. He received the aid of one hundred florins from Michael de Kenderessy to help him in this journey.

=== Eastward bound ===
The journey that Csoma undertook after leaving Croatia is reconstructed mainly from to a letter that Csoma wrote introducing himself to the British Captain Kennedy who detained him on entry at Sabathu on suspicion of being a spy. Csoma did not apply for an Imperial passport and obtained a Hungarian passport at Nagyenyed and visited Bucharest. He had it signed by the General Commandant in Nagyszeben (today Sibiu, Romania) and went to Wallachia at the end of November 1819. He attempted to go to Constantinople but not finding the means he left Bucharest on 1 January 1820 and passed the Danube by Rustchuk and reached Sofia and then after five days to Philipopolis (now Plovdiv).

=== Middle East, Central Asia ===
Route taken by Csoma

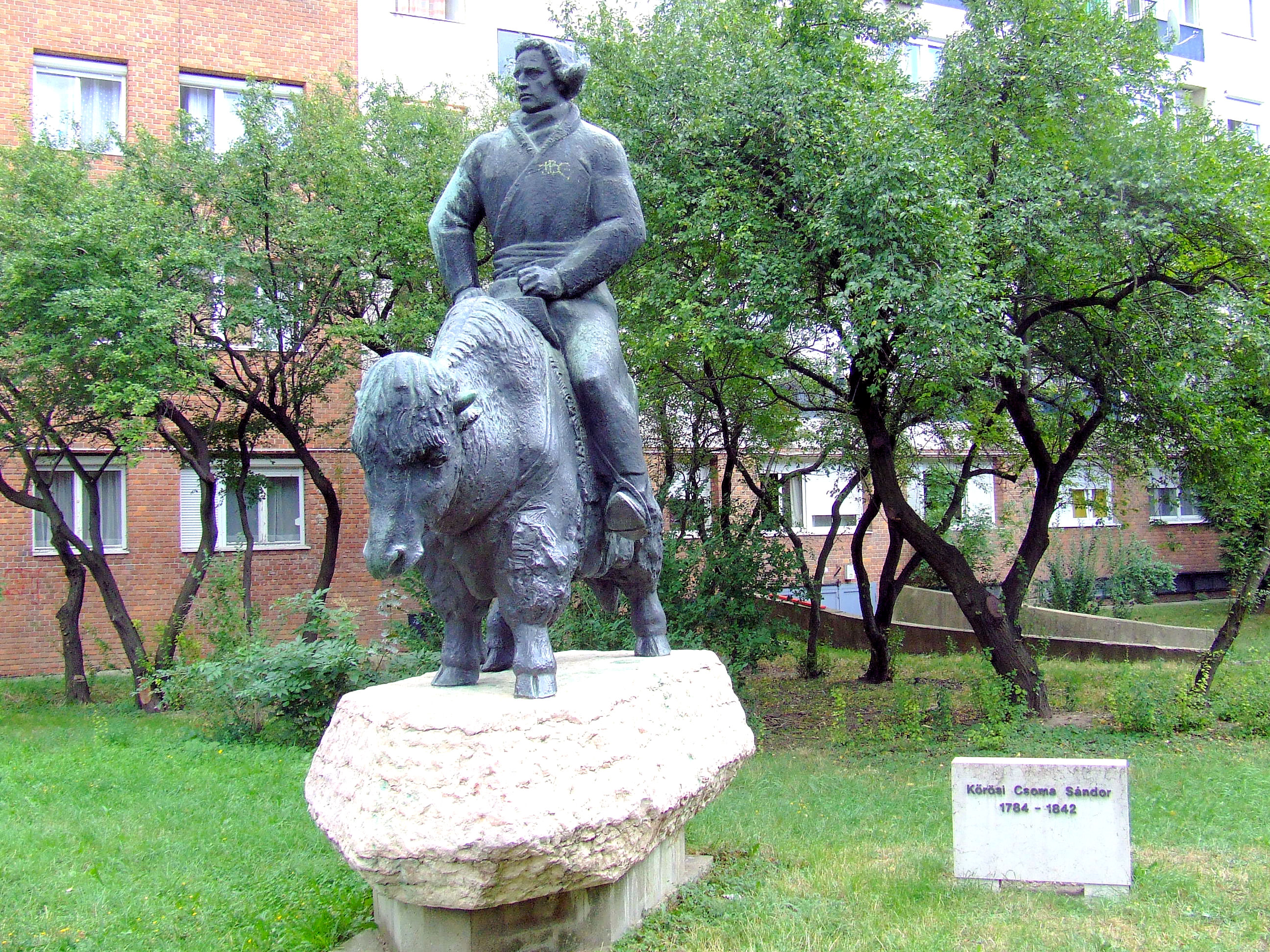
Statue of Alexander Csoma de Koros riding a yak

Csoma de Kőrös arrived in Edirne (Adrianopolis) and he wished to go from there to Constantinople but was forced by a plague outbreak to move to Enos. He left Enos on 7 February 1820 and reached Alexandria on a Greek ship. He reached on the last day of February but had to leave soon due to a plague epidemic. He boarded a Syrian ship to Larnaca in Cyprus and then took another ship to Tripoli and Latakia. From here he travelled on foot and reached Aleppo in Syria on 13 April. He left on 19 May, joining various caravans and by raft along the river going through Urfa, Mardin and Mosul to arrive in Baghdad on 22 July. He wrote to the British resident Mr. Rich and sought help in his travels. He was provided a European dress and money through a Hungarian friend Mr. Swoboda with whom he stayed. He left Baghdad on 4 September and travelled with a caravan through Kermanshah and Hamadan and reached Tehran on 14 October 1820. He sought help from Henry Willock who made it possible for him to stay on for about four months. He left Tehran on 1 March 1821, leaving behind his passport and papers and changing from a European costume to a Persian one apart from writing notes in Hungarian which were to be passed on in the event that he died on his way to Bukhara. He reached Meshed on 18 April and due to the troubles in the area he could not continue until 20 October. He reached Bukhara on 18 November. He initially intended to spend the winter in Bukhara but fearing the Russian army he left after five days and joined a caravan that passed through Balk, Kulm, and Bamian to reach Kabul on 6 January 1822. He left Kabul on 19 January and headed towards Peshawar. On 26 January he met two French officers at Daka, Messrs. Allard and Ventura, who joined him to Lahore. He reached Lahore on 11 March and left on the 23rd passing through Amritsar, Jammu to reach Kashmir on 17 April. Finding company to travel with he left on 9 May to reach Leh on 9 June. Finding the route to Yarkand risky, he decided to return to Lahore and on the way to Kashmir, on 16 July 1822 he met William Moorcroft, the famous English explorer. He decided to stay on with Moorcroft and joined him to Leh. Here Moorcroft introduced Csoma to George Trebeck. He also lent Csoma a copy of Alphabetum Tibetanum by Agostino Antonio Giorgi. He also helped Moorcroft by translating a Russian letter (from Count Nesselrode Petersburgh dated 17 January 1820) addressed to Ranjeet Singh into Latin. Before Moorcroft left Leh, Csoma requested him that he wished to stay on with Trebeck in Leh. He then joined Trebeck back to Srinagar on 26 November. He stayed on here for five months and six days during which time he took an interest in the Tibetan language and discussed with Moorcroft an interest in examining the contents of the books found in the local monasteries.

=== In Ladakh ===
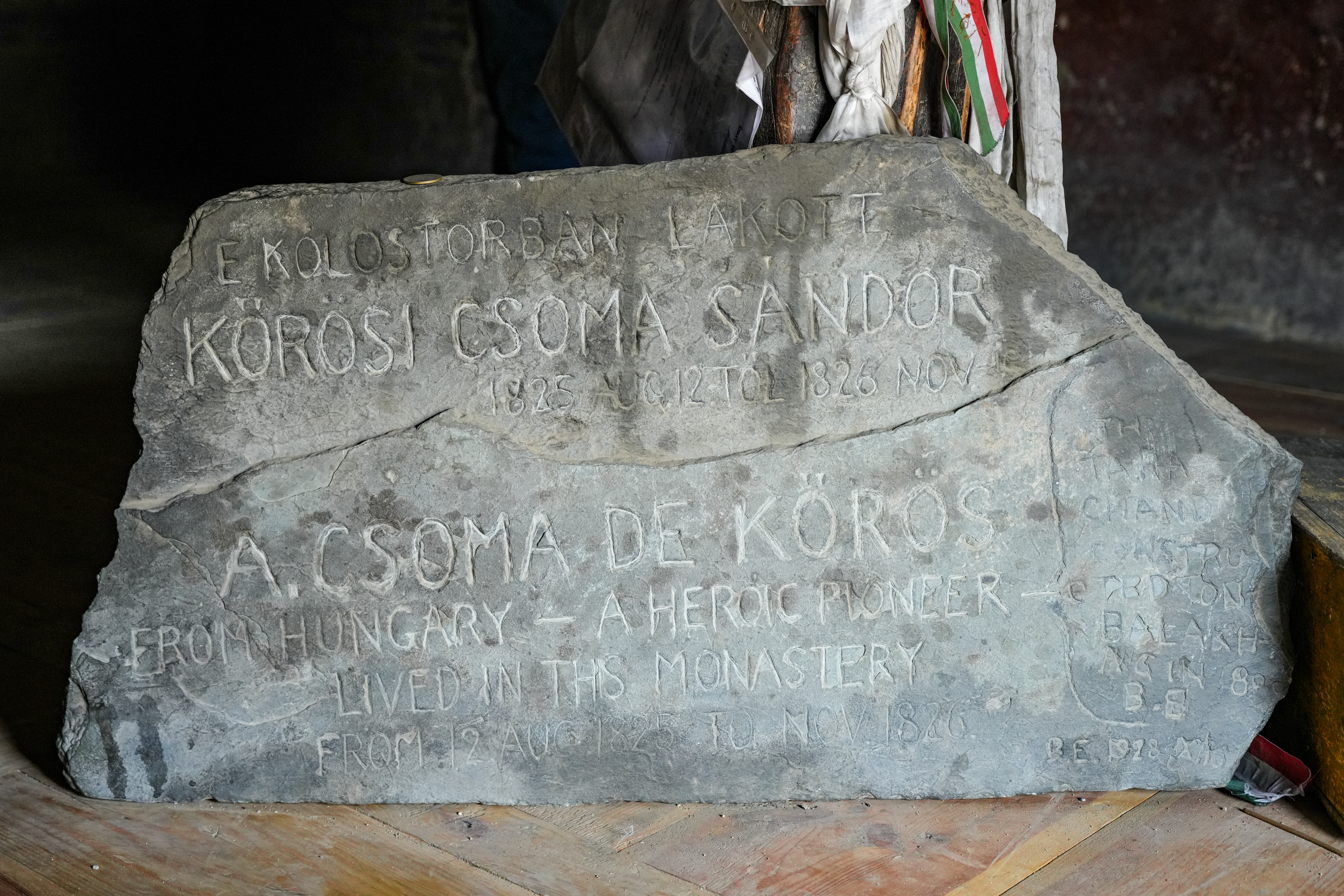
Stone plaque in Phuktal Monastery commemorating Csoma's stay there from 12 August 1825 to November 1826.

Moorcroft recommended Csoma and wrote to obtain subsistence and support from the chief officer at Leh and the Lama of Yangla at Zanskar. Csoma left Kashmir on 2 May 1823 and reached Leh on 1 June 1823. From here he travelled to Yangla on the 9th and stayed in Zanskar from 20 June to 22 October 1824. At Zanskar he studied under a Lama. Towards winter he decided to move to Kullu and reached Subathu on 26 November. Here he was detained by Captain Kennedy who suspected him of being a spy. However, a letter of introduction and testimony from Moorcroft clarified his position. It was not until May that the government response from Calcutta reached Subathu which absolved him of any suspicion from the British government. On 6 June 1825, he left Subathu and reached Pukdal or Pukhtar in Zanskar. He returned to Subathu only on 17 January 1827 with some regret that his Lama instructor was not able to give enough time and attention. On his return to Subathu, Captain Kennedy wrote to Horace Hayman Wilson at the Asiatic Society of Bengal that he wished to discuss literary subjects and Tibet. He also noted that Csoma was not in need of money, having saved Rs. 150 from the Rs. 500 advanced to him by the Government two years ago. He also noted that Csoma ".. declines any attention that I would be most happy to show him, and he lives in the most retired manner."

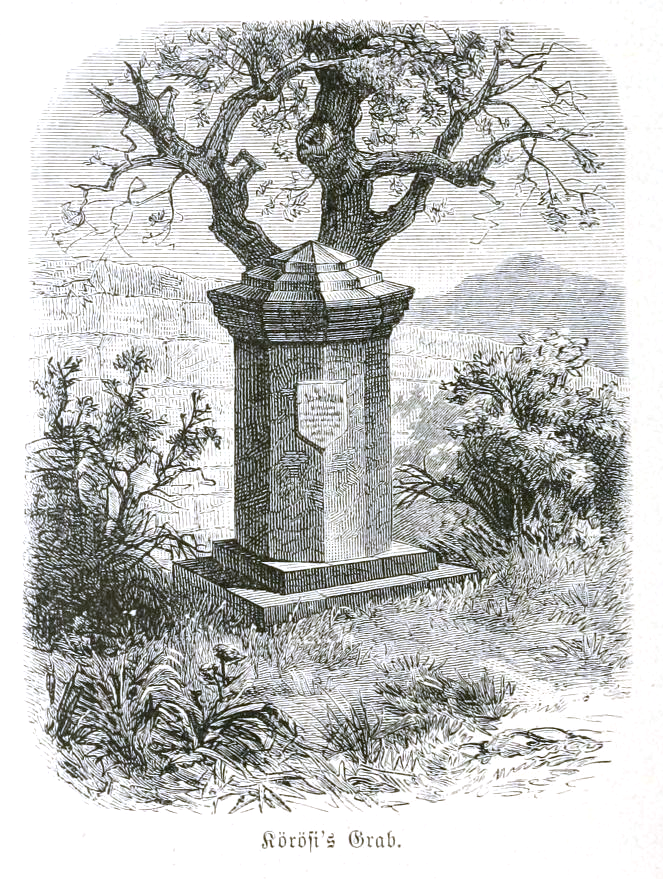
Grave of Csoma in 1877

During this period at Zanskar (he was the first European to visit the valley), he was immersed in an intense sixteen-month study of the Tibetan language and the Indo-Tibetan Buddhism at the core of its literature, with a local lama, Sangs-rgyas-phun-tshogs. He was one of the first Europeans to master the Tibetan language and read two of the great encyclopedias of Indo-Tibetan Buddhist literature the Kangyur (100 volumes) and the bsTan-'gyur (224 volumes) which contained translations of Buddhist books brought from India. From May 1827 to October 1830 he resided in Kanum in Upper Bashahr (present-day Kinnaur) in the Simla Hill States where he studied the collection of Tibetan manuscripts he had amassed in Ladakh, living on a monthly stipend of Rs. 50/- from the British. With his dictionary and grammar complete, Csoma went to Calcutta to oversee its publication.

In the course of his travels Csoma used various names modified for local use. These included Sikander (from Alexander) with the Beg or Mulla suffix and Rumi, Roome, modified into Tibetan as Rumpa as a prefix indicating he was from Rome. He sometimes signed as Secunder Roome.

=== In Calcutta and Darjeeling ===
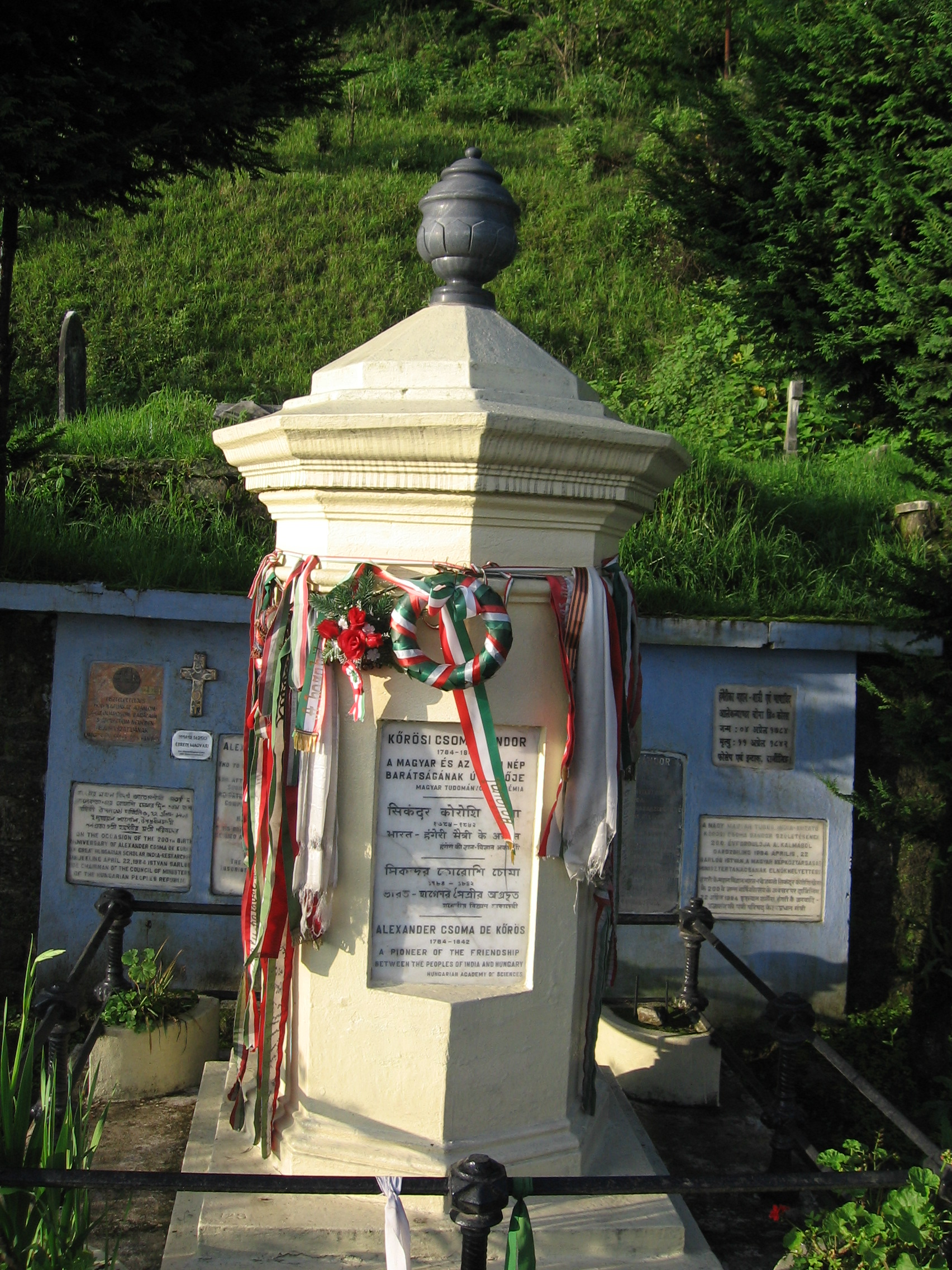
Memorial at Darjeeling

In 1831 Csoma joined the Royal Asiatic Society of Bengal in Calcutta. In 1833 he was unanimously elected as an honorary member of the Asiatic Society. In 1834 he was made an honorary member of the Royal Asiatic Society. From 1837 to 1841, he worked as Librarian of the Asiatic Society. In 1842 he planned to travel to Lhasa, but contracted malaria while traveling in the Terai and died in Darjeeling. He was buried in Darjeeling Old Cemetery.

== Personal life ==
Csoma lived as an ascetic. He often slept on bare earth and ate a diet of bread, curd cheese, fruit and salad or boiled rice and tea. He rarely ate meat and never consumed alcohol. Csoma was known to abstain from drinking water for days. He could "live in the most trying circumstances in the most difficult of climate and terrain". He never sought financial assistance for his work.

== Memorials and honours ==
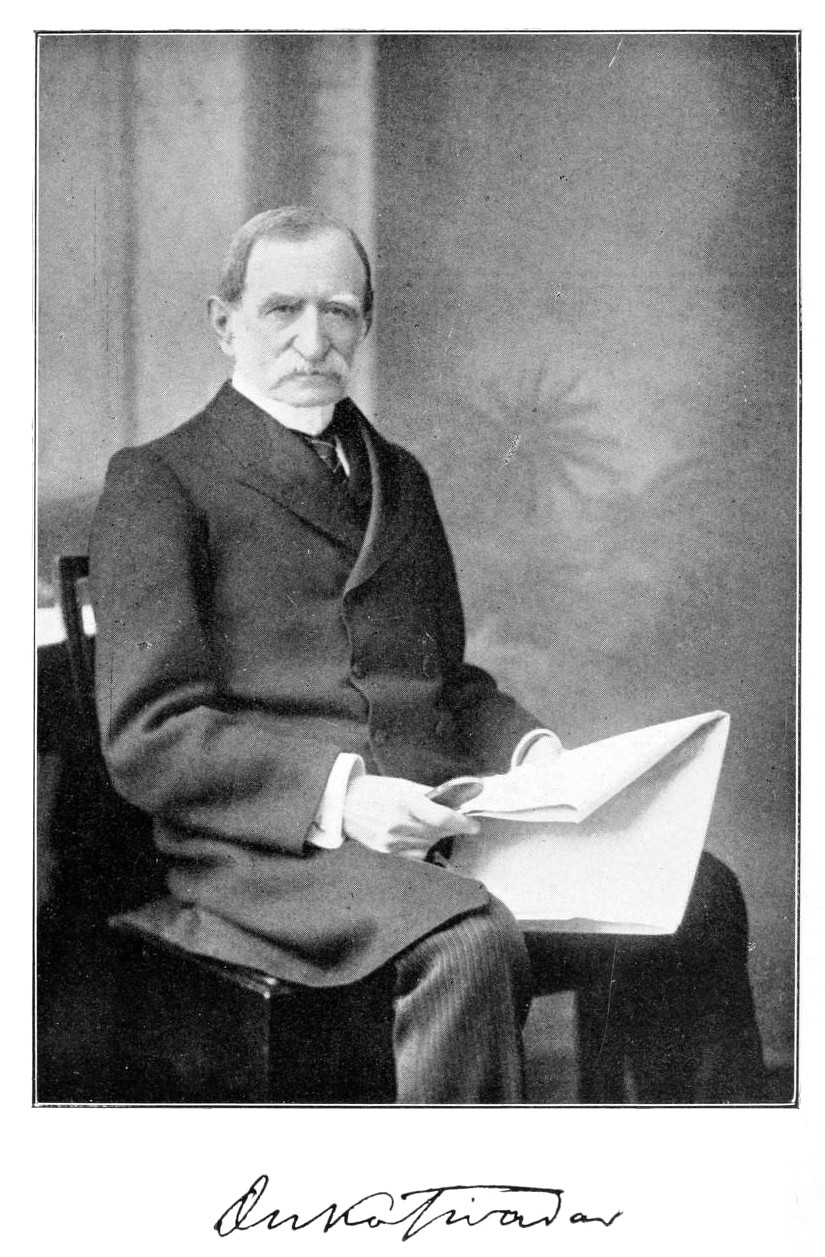
Csoma's biographer, Theodore Duka, was an Army surgeon of Hungarian origin who worked in India

The grave of Csoma at Darjeeling was marked by a memorial by the Asiatic Society of Bengal. It is included in the list of monuments of historical maintained by the Archaeological Survey of India (Calcutta circle). A tablet was placed by the Hungarian government with the words of Count István Széchenyi : "A poor lonely Hungarian, without applause or money but inspired with enthusiasm sought the Hungarian native country but in the end broke down under the burden". A project has been started to restore the old royal palace (Kharkongma) of Zangla where Csoma de Kőrös lived and compiled his Tibetan–English dictionary.

He was declared as a Bodhisattva (canonized as a Buddhist saint) on 22 February 1933 in Japan. A statue of him in lotus posture by the Hungarian sculptor Géza Csorba was placed on the occasion at the shrine in the Tokyo Buddhist University. On his 200th birth anniversary in 1984, the Hungarian government released a postal stamp depicting him and his travel. In 1992 a park in his memory was opened at Tar and inaugurated by the Dalai Lama.

- In 1904, Kőrös, his home village changed its name to Csomakőrös in honour of the 120th anniversary of Csoma's birth, and to distinguish itself from other towns named Kőrös in Hungary.
- In 1920, the Kőrösi Csoma Society, a society dedicated to the study of the Orient was founded and named for Csoma.
- Csoma was honoured by Hungary by the issuance of a postage stamps: on 1 July 1932.
- On 30 March 1984, Csoma, the Master of Tibetan Philology, was depicted on a commemorative postage stamp by Hungary; in the background a map of Tibet can be seen.

== Works of Csoma de Kőrös ==
- Essay towards a Dictionary, Tibetan and English. Prepared, with assistance of Bandé Sangs-rgyas Phuntshogs ... by Alexander Csoma de Kőrös, etc., Calcutta: Baptist Mission Press, 1834.
- Analysis of the Dulva, part of the Kangyur, Asiatic Researches, Calcutta, 1836, vol. 20-1, pp. 41–93 (on line).
- Essay towards a Dictionary, Tibetan and English, Budapest: Akadémiai Kiadó, 1984.
- A Grammar of the Tibetan Language in English. Prepared under the patronage of the Government and the auspices of the Asiatic Society of Bengal., Calcutta: Baptist Mission Press, 1834.
- Grammar of the Tibetan Language, Budapest: Akadémiai Kiadó, 1984.
- Sanskrit-Tibetan-English Vocabulary: being an edition and translation of the Mahāvyutpatti, Budapest: Akadémiai Kiadó, 1984.
- Collected works of Alexander Csoma de Körös, Budapest: Akadémiai Kiadó, 1984.

== Works about Csoma de Kőrös ==
Books

- Duka, Theodore Life and works of Alexander Csoma de Kőrös: a biography compiled chiefly from hitherto unpublished data; with a brief notice of each of his unpublished works and essays, as well as of his still extant manuscripts. London: Trübner, 1885. (Also in Project Gutenberg)
- Mukerjee, Hirendra Nath Hermit-hero from Hungary, Alexander Csoma de Koros, the great Tibetologist. New Delhi: Light & Life Publishers, 1981.
- Le Calloch, Bernard Alexandre Csoma de Kőrös. Paris: La nouvelle revue tibétaine, 1985.
- Fox, Edward The Hungarian Who Walked to Heaven (Alexander Csoma de Koros 1784-1842). Short Books, 2001.

Films

- A Guest of Life, a film by Tibor Szemző, 2006. IMDB
- Zangla – Path of Csoma, a film by Zoltán Bonta, 2008.

Scholarly Articles

- "New Discoveries about Alexander Csoma de Kőrös and the Buddhist Monasteries of Northern India" by Judith Galántha Herman (Montreal), Lectures and Papers in Hungarian Studies, no. 44.
- "Alexander Csoma de Kőrös the Hungarian Bodhisattva" by Dr. Ernest Hetenyi PDF of the full text

== Catalogue of the Csoma de Kőrös Collection ==
- Collection of Tibetan mss. and xylographs of Alexander Csoma de Kőrös. József Terjék. Budapest : Magyar Tudományos Akadémia Könyvtára, 1976.
- Original copies of the Tibetan and English Dictionary and Grammar of the Tibetan Language in English are available at the British Library.
