= Hetényi =

Hetényi is a Hungarian surname. Notable people with the surname include:

- Antal Hetényi (1947–2023), Hungarian judoka
- Ernő Hetényi (1912–1999), Hungarian tibetologist
- István Hetényi (1926–2008), Hungarian politician
- Miklós Imre Hetényi (1906–1984), Hungarian and american engineering scientist.
- Zoltán Hetényi (born 1988), Hungarian ice hockey player
