= William Moorcroft (explorer) =

18th/19th-century English traveler

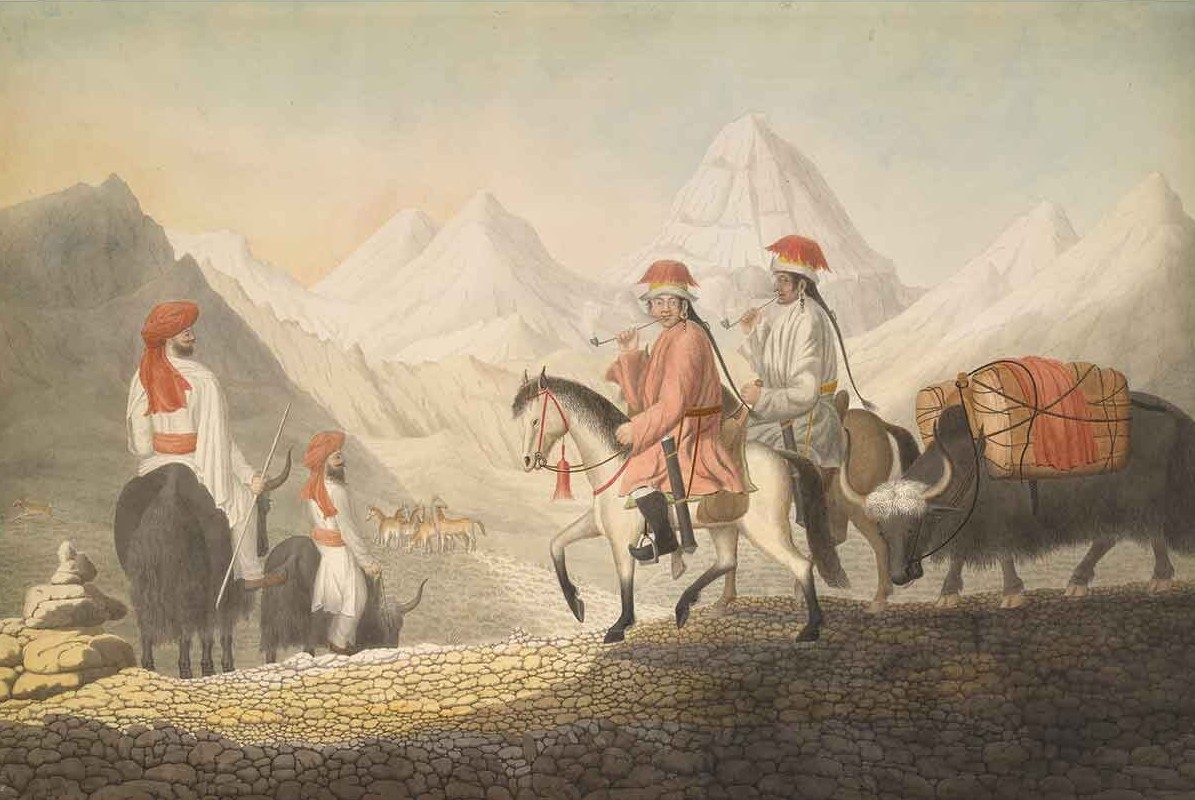
Moorcroft and Hyder Young Hearsey on yaks (left) with two Chinese horsemen near Lake Manasarovar, Tibet, July 1812

William Moorcroft (1767 – 27 August 1825) was an English veterinarian and explorer employed by the East India Company. Moorcroft travelled extensively throughout the Himalayas, Tibet and Central Asia, eventually reaching Bukhara, in present-day Uzbekistan.

== Early life and education ==
Moorcroft was born in Ormskirk, Lancashire, the illegitimate son of Ann Moorcroft, daughter of a local farmer. He was baptised in 1767 in St Peter & St Paul, the Parish Church of Ormskirk, where there is a commemorative plaque to his life. His family had sufficient means to secure an apprenticeship with a surgeon in Liverpool but during this time an unknown disease decimated cattle herds in Lancashire and young William was recruited to treat stricken animals. His proficiency so impressed the county landowners they offered to underwrite his education if he would abandon surgery to attend a veterinarian college in Lyon, France. He arrived in France in the revolutionary year of 1789 and became the first Englishman to qualify as a veterinary surgeon. On completing his course he began practice in London, established a "hospital for horses" on Oxford Street, helped found the first British veterinary college, proposed new surgical methods for curing lameness in horses, and acquired four patents on machines to manufacture horseshoes. In 1795, Moorcroft published a pamphlet of directions for the medical treatment of horses, with special reference to India, and in 1800 a Cursory Account of the Methods of Shoeing Horses.

== Career ==
=== Superintendent of stud ===
In 1803 a citizen army was mobilised to defend Britain against a threatened Napoleonic invasion. Moorcroft joined the Westminster Volunteer Cavalry. He came to the attention of Edward Parry, a director of the East India Company (EIC), who recruited Moorcroft to manage the East India Company's stud in Bengal. In 1808 Moorcroft left for India and arrived in Calcutta, the then capital of British India.

Moorcroft found the company stud in dire shape, with apparently depressing signs of laxness, neglect and ignorance. Often undersized mares were bred with local stallions, the best colts were kept back and stud books falsified. He improved the procedures at the stud. He took brisk charge of his staff and weeded out deficient horses. Moorcroft also cultivated oats on a large scale in India and set aside 3,000 acres (12 km^{2}) at Pusa for its production.

In 1811 Moorcroft travelled extensively in the northern sub-continent in search of better breeding stock. Despite travelling to Lucknow, the capital of Oudh, and to Benares, then still part of Maratha territory, Moorcroft failed to acquire the ideal breeding horses that he sought. In Benares he learned that Bukhara was rumoured to have "the greatest horse market in the world." Moorcroft recruited a Persian named Mir Izzat-Allah to make a scouting trip to Bukhara and map out the route. He also learned that fine breeding horses might be found in Tibet.

=== Expedition to Tibet ===
Moorcroft and Captain William Hearsey disguised themselves as gosain pilgrims, and travelled through Garhwal, carrying a stock of merchandise for trading with the Tibetans. They travelled through the upper Ganges valley, and then the Dhauliganga valley and crossed the Niti Pass on 1 July 1812. Here they were met by Rawats who were under strict orders from Tibet to repel the foreigners. With his charm, the promise of gain, and proficient use of his medical kit, Moorcroft gained the friendship of two influential Rawats, Deb Singh and his brother Bir Singh. The orders from Tibet were ignored and Amer Singh, the son of Bir Singh, was recruited to serve as a guide through the Niti pass and over the Tibetan plateau. Arriving at the town of Daba they awaited permission to proceed to Gartok (then the seat of the Garpon, or Governor, of Western Tibet). The Garpon agreed to sell them pashm shal wool (Cashmere), and granted permission for them to travel to the sacred lake of Manasarowar. Moorcroft reached the main upper branch of the Indus near its source, and on 5 August arrived at Lake Manasarovar, which they explored extensively. Returning via the Sutlej valley, he was detained for some time by the Gorkhas in Nepal, but eventually reached Calcutta in November, only to be chastised severely by the EIC for his failure to find horses—they were not interested in shawl wool or Tibetan lakes.

While in Nepal he collected botanical specimens with Nathaniel Wallich.

=== Bukhara ===
The journey to Tibet only served to whet Moorcroft's appetite for more extensive travel. But when he broached the idea of a new horse buying expedition to Bukhara in 1816, a searing reply from the EIC Board of Managers warned Moorcroft to keep "steady" at his stud duties and not "waste his time" on "wild and romantick (sic) excursions to the banks of the Amoo (Oxus) and the plains of Chinese Tartary." What Moorcroft coveted most were the Turkoman horses, with their pale golden coats, narrow chests, long necks and sturdy legs. The "good Turcoman horses" that Marco Polo had described some 500 years earlier could travel 100 miles (160 km) a day for weeks on end. Their descendants, the Akhal-Teke, are bred to this day in Turkmenistan and Russia. Moorcroft persisted in his quest and his seven-year campaign was finally rewarded in May 1819 when Charles Metcalfe, head of the EIC's Political and Secret Department, granted him leave to proceed. Metcalfe's goal was to use his friend as an intelligence scout on his epic journey.

Moorcroft's preparations took nearly a year. His roster of recruits included the Persian, Mir Izzat Khan, who had already made the trip alone some years before and an Afghan, Gulam Hyder Khan from his previous expedition to Tibet. Nineteen-year-old George Trebeck, a recent arrival in Calcutta, was selected as second in command. The total expedition totalled 300 persons, including an escort of 12 Gurkas, sixteen horses and mules along with £4,000 of trading goods as well as medical supplies and equipment.

Painting claimed to depict explorer William Moorcroft, c. 1820

Leaving the main caravan at the border of the Punjab on the Sutlej River, Moorcroft travelled separately to Lahore to obtain permission from Maharaja Ranjit Singh to traverse his territory. This was finally granted in mid May 1820. He then met up with Trebeck and the rest of his party at Sultanpur in the Kulu valley in August. From there the caravan trekked up the Beas River, crossed the 13,300-foot (4,100 m) Rohtang Pass and descended into the Lahul valley and the city of Leh, capital of the Buddhist kingdom of Ladakh. Leh was reached on 24 September where several months were spent exploring the surrounding country. A commercial treaty was concluded with the government of Ladakh, by which the whole of Central Asia was virtually opened to British trade in exchange for British protection. Unfortunately, this treaty would have required the Ladakhis to break relations with Ranjit Singh, the Maharajah of the Sikh Empire. The EIC placed a high value on its alliance with Ranjit Singh so once again Moorcroft had overstepped his authority. His engagement with Ladakh was repudiated and his salary suspended. In all nearly two years were spent in Ladakh, awaiting permission from the Chinese in Yarkand to proceed.

While exploring Ladakh he had a chance encounter with another European, Alexander Csoma de Kőrös a penniless Hungarian philologist from Transylvania. Csoma was searching for the ancient Asian roots of the Hungarian language in the Tibetan tongue. Moorcroft shared his own Tibetan dictionary with the traveller and although Csoma failed to prove his thesis he is now widely seen as the founder of Tibetology. It was Moorcroft who steered Csoma towards the compilation of the first Tibetan-English dictionary and grammar book for the EIC.

Moorcroft continued his journey, reaching Kashmir on 3 November 1822, Jalalabad on 4 June 1824, and Kabul on 20 June. He and his companions were the first Europeans to see the Buddhas of Bamiyan and the first Englishmen to see the upper Oxus. They reached Bokhara on 25 February 1825, but found none of the rumored horses and also learned that a Russian mission had reached Bokhara four years before.

== Death ==
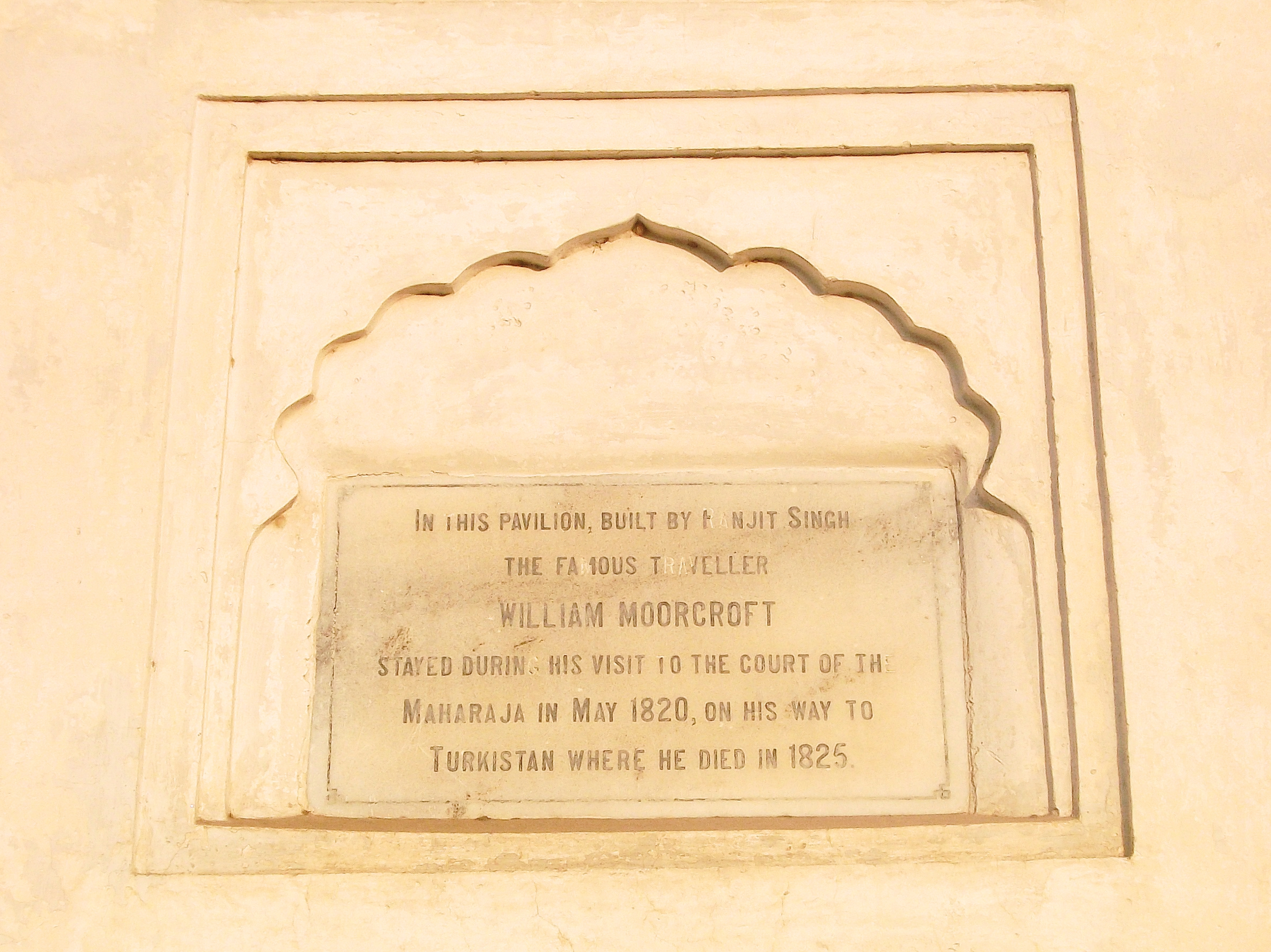
William Moorcroft's plaque in the Shalimar Gardens in Lahore, now in Pakistan, where Moorcroft stayed in May 1820

Returning, at Andkhoy, in Afghan Turkestan, Moorcroft was seized with fever, of which he died on 27 August 1825, with Trebeck surviving him by only a few days. However, according to the Abbé Huc, Moorcroft reached Lhasa in 1826, and lived there twelve years, being assassinated on his way back to India in 1838, although this story of Moorcroft's "second life" has been explained by late 20th-century research as unlikely.

== Legacy ==
In 1841, Moorcroft's papers were obtained by the Asiatic Society, and published under the editorship of H. H. Wilson as Travels in the Himalayan Provinces of Hinduslan and the Punjab, in Ladakh and Kashnair, in Peshawur, Kabul, Kunduz and Bokhara, from 1819 to 1825.

The columbine species Aquilegia moorcroftiana is named for Moorcroft. It is the species of columbine found at the highest altitude in nature.

== Bibliography ==
- Garry Alder, Beyond Bokhara: The Life of William Moorcroft, Asian Explorer and Veterinary Surgeon, 1767–1825. Century, 1985, ISBN 0712607226
- Peter Hopkirk, The Great Game: On Secret Service in High Asia, John Murray, 1990, ISBN 071954727X
