= Dharma Gate Buddhist College =

College in Budapest, Hungary

- A Tan Kapuja Buddhista Főiskola
- Type: Religious higher education institution
- Established: 1991
- Rector: Gábor Karsai
- Students: c. 300
- Location: Budapest, Hungary
- Website: http://www.tkbf.hu/

Dharma Gate Buddhist College (Hungarian: A Tan Kapuja Buddhista Főiskola) is a Hungarian religious higher education institution founded by the Dharma Gate Buddhist Church in 1991. Its undergraduate and graduate programs typically have around 300 students. The college is one of the most important elements of Buddhism in Hungary.

The institution is actively involved in the Erasmus+ program, offering its students opportunities for academic mobility and internships throughout Europe.

== History ==
On May 27, 1991, 108 founding members established the Dharma Gate Buddhist Church. The five founding communities formed the church council, and the church was officially registered at the beginning of summer. One month later, the church founded its higher education institution, the Dharma Gate Buddhist College. The church council appointed Antal Dobosy as rector and Pál Farkas as dean. After inviting teachers, compiling the college curriculum, and drafting organizational and operational regulations, the first entrance examination was held with 61 applicants. In the autumn, teaching began at Keleti Károly utca 13, in the premises of the Independent Lawyers’ Forum. The four-year educational system was established in 1995. In 2000, evening and weekend courses were officially launched. In 2006, the college transitioned to the Bologna system. The first distance learning program started in 2022.

== Notable events ==
- Loszang Szönam Geshe, a Tibetan Buddhist monk and teacher, became a professor at the college between 1995 and 2001.
- Ernő Hetényi gave a lecture at the college a year before his death. This became one of the most important church celebrations, the Maitreya Festival, held every year at the winter solstice (see Maitreya).
- In 2003, the renovation of the Börzsöny utca building was completed, including the transformation of the courtyard into a ritual hall and temple, with a stupa top consecrated by Namkhai Norbu Rinpoche.
- In 2015, a new altar was inaugurated in the old corner dharma room of the college.

== Education ==
The college does not have faculties but offers students the opportunity to become acquainted with a wide range of Buddhist traditions, with no one tradition considered superior to others. Theoretical and practical courses cover the history and teachings of Buddhist schools, as well as related philosophical and religious systems (such as Hinduism and Taoism). Emphasis is placed on personal master–disciple relationships in addition to classroom instruction. The college also provides opportunities to practice Eastern martial arts. Students can choose from among three classical Eastern languages: Sanskrit, Pali, and Tibetan. Students deeply committed to Buddhism can become religious teachers or monks. Specializations are offered annually or biennially under the credit system, and upon successful completion, the diploma lists the theological qualification. ·

== Facilities ==
- Uszó Buddhist Educational, Cultural, and Retreat Center (near Bükkmogyorósd)
- Mánfa Retreat Center and Creative Space (MEKA)

== Partner institutions ==
- Kodolányi János University
- Mahachulalongkornrajavidyalaya University

== See also ==
- Dharma Gate Buddhist Church
- Buddhism in Hungary
