= Volker Zotz =

Austrian religious studies scholar

- Born: 28 October 1956 (age 69); Landau in der Pfalz, Germany
- Citizenship: Austria
- Education: Ph.D. from University of Vienna
- Occupations: writer, university professor
- Spouse: Birgit Zotz
- Writing career
- Period: since 1978 (books)
- Subjects: Buddhism, Confucianism, philosophy, religious studies, lyric poetry, fiction, essay
- Notable works: Geschichte der buddhistischen Philosophie (1996); Konfuzius für den Westen (2007)
- Website: volkerzotz.eu

Volker Helmut Manfred Zotz (born 28 October 1956) is an eminent Austrian philosopher, religious studies scholar, Buddhologist and a prolific author.

== Early life ==
The Zotz family originated in Tyrol and spread to Germany. Volker Zotz was born in Landau in der Pfalz, Germany, where he attended elementary school and high school.

His interest in spirituality led him to an early study of Christianity as well as of Indian and Chinese religions. What impressed him most was Buddhist philosophy and meditation. When Zotz was sixteen he became a major disciple of Lama Anagarika Govinda, with whom he was close until his death in 1985. During his high school days, Zotz also met the author Oscar Kiss Maerth, whose ideas he did not completely agree with, but with whom he had an intense exchange of ideas.

After graduating from Max Slevogt High School in Landau in the 1970s, he published his first poems in two volumes and a novel. As a conscientious objector Zotz had to perform eighteen months of alternative civilian service in a nursing home. From 1978 he studied Buddhism under Ernst Steinkellner and philosophy under Kurt Rudolf Fischer at the University of Vienna. He repeatedly interrupted his studies in Vienna to conduct research and fieldwork in India, Nepal and Afghanistan and to receive spiritual training from Lama Anagarika Govinda.

== Career ==
In 1986 Zotz received a Ph.D. from the University of Vienna for his doctoral thesis Zur Rezeption, Interpretation und Kritik des Buddhismus im deutschen Sprachraum. This dissertation investigates the influence of Buddhism on German philosophy, literature and culture during the Fin de siècle.

Zotz has been a lecturer of Buddhist philosophy at the University of Vienna. 1989 he moved to Japan where he was a professor and researcher at Ryukoku University and Otani University in Kyoto and at Rissho University in Tokyo for ten years. During the period in Japan he was influenced considerably by the Buddhologist Takamaro Shigaraki. In 1999 Zotz was appointed professor of philosophy at the University of Luxembourg. At that time he was also teaching at Saarland University.

Besides his scholarly work, Volker Zotz's European audience knows him as author and publicist. The volume, Buddha, is the most popular book on its topic in German language, regularly reprinted and translated into several languages. Zotz is a leading member of the Arya Maitreya Mandala, founded by Lama Anagarika Govinda in 1933. In the early 1990s Zotz initiated a study centre called Komyoji in Austria which is an attempt at describing a cross-cultural philosophy of religion. Since 1994 Zotz has been the driving force behind many of Komyoji's educational programs, such as workshops explaining various philosophical and theological topics. Volker Zotz is married to the Austrian writer and anthropologist Birgit Zotz.

== Select bibliography ==
- Maitreya. Kontemplationen über den Buddha der Zukunft. Mit einem Vorwort von Lama Anagarika Govinda. Hannoversch Münden 1984 (ISBN 3-87998-054-3)
- Zur Rezeption, Interpretation und Kritik des Buddhismus im deutschen Sprachraum vom Fin-de-Siècle bis 1930. Historische Skizze und Hauptmotive. Wien: Phil. Diss., 1986.
- Maitréja. Elmélkedések a jövö Buddhájáról. Körösi Csoma Sandor Buddhológiai Intézet, Budapest 1986
- Freiheit und Glück. Buddhas Lehren für das tägliche Leben. München 1987 (ISBN 3-8138-0090-3).
- André Breton. Rowohlt, Reinbek bei Hamburg 1990 (ISBN 3-499-50374-3)
- Erleuchtung im Alltag. München 1990, (ISBN 3-8138-0175-6)
- Buddha. Rowohlt, Reinbek bei Hamburg 1991, 6. Auflage 2001 (ISBN 3-499-50477-4)
- André Breton. Préface de José Pierre. Paris: Édition d'art Somogy, 1991 (ISBN 2-85056-199-1)
- Der Buddha im Reinen Land. Shin-Buddhismus in Japan. Diederichs, München 1991 (ISBN 3-424-01120-7)
- Buddha. Votobia, Olomouc 1995 (ISBN 80-85885-72-7)
- Geschichte der buddhistischen Philosophie. Rowohlt, Reinbek near Hamburg 1996 (ISBN 3-499-55537-9)
- Buddha. Hangilsa, Seoul 1997 (ISBN 89-356-0136-5)
- Mit Buddha das Leben meistern. Buddhismus für Praktiker. Rowohlt, Reinbek bei Hamburg 1999, 4. Auflage 2003 (ISBN 3-499-60586-4)
- Konfuzius. Rowohlt, Reinbek bei Hamburg 2000 (ISBN 3-499-50555-X)
- Auf den glückseligen Inseln. Buddhismus in der deutschen Kultur. Theseus, Berlin 2000 (ISBN 3-89620-151-4)
- Totus tuus. Marianisches Lesebuch zur Luxemburger Muttergottes-Oktave., ed. with Friederike Migneco, Kairos, Luxembourg 2004, ISBN 2-9599829-9-1.
- Die neue Wirtschaftsmacht am Ganges. Redline, Heidelberg 2006, ISBN 3-636-01373-4
- Buda, Maestro de Vida. Ellago Ediciones 2006, ISBN 84-95881-87-X
- Konfuzius für den Westen. Neue Sehnsucht nach alten Werten. O.W. Barth 2007, ISBN 978-3-502-61164-6

== See also ==
- List of Austrian writers
