= Birgit Zotz =

Austrian writer and anthropologist

- Born: Birgit Hutter; 7 August 1979 (age 47); Waidhofen an der Thaya
- Citizenship: Austria
- Education: University of Vienna
- Occupations: writer, anthropologist
- Spouse: Volker Zotz
- Writing career
- Period: since 2010 (books)
- Subjects: Tibet, Buddhism anthropology of religion, cross-cultural hospitality management
- Notable work: Destination Tibet (2010)
- Website: birgit-zotz.at

Birgit Zotz (born 7 August 1979) is an Austrian writer, cultural anthropologist and an expert on the subject of hospitality management studies.

== Life ==
Born in Waidhofen an der Thaya, Lower Austria, Zotz grew up in the Waldviertel and in Vienna. From 1993 to 1997 she attended the Franz Schubert Konservatorium in Vienna, where she studied saxophone. She got a master's degree in tourism studies from Johannes Kepler University of Linz in 2008 and later obtained a master's degree in ethnology from Vienna University under Manfred Kremser. She is married to Volker Zotz, an eminent Austrian philosopher, and a prolific author in the German language.

== Career ==
Birgit Zotz has published books, essays and articles about Buddhist culture, mysticism and image-building in tourism. She is a lecturer at the International College of Tourism and Management in Bad Vöslau. Since 2005 she has been President of Komyoji, an internationally recognized center for the study of Buddhism in Austria. She is a researcher on the philosophy and life of Lama Anagarika Govinda, whose biography she wrote.

== Books ==
- Das Image des Waldviertels als Urlaubsregion. Vienna University of Economics and Business 2006
- Das Image Tibets als Reiseziel im Spiegel deutschsprachiger Medien. Linz: Kepler University 2008
- Das Waldviertel – Zwischen Mystik und Klarheit. Das Image einer Region als Reiseziel. Berlin: Köster 2010, ISBN 978-3-89574-734-2
- Destination Tibet. Touristisches Image zwischen Politik und Klischee. Hamburg: Kovac 2010, ISBN 978-3-8300-4948-7
- Zur europäischen Wahrnehmung von Besessenheitsphänomenen und Orakelwesen in Tibet Vienna University 2010 .

== See also ==
- List of Austrian writers

== Sources ==
- Lexikon des Waldviertels, Birgit Zotz
- International College of Tourism and Management, Faculty
- Lebenslauf von Birgit Zotz
- Birgit Zotz, Tibetische Mystik, – nach Lama Anagarika Govinda
