= George Trebeck =

British geographer

George Trebeck (1800–1825) was a British geographer. He was born in Middlesex, England and moved to Calcutta, Bengal Presidency circa 1815 with his father Charles Trebeck and brother of the same name. George Trebeck, who was trained as a solicitor, was recruited by William Moorcroft at the age of 19 as his geographer and draftsman and second-in-charge of an expedition to Central Asia, ostensibly to find horses. Along with Moorcroft, Trebeck travelled through the Himalayan provinces of United Provinces, the Punjab, Ladakh, Kashmir, Peshawar, Kabul, Kunduz and Bokhara. They were unable to purchase horses. During the return journey, both Moorcroft and Trebeck died of illness, Trebeck a few months after Moorcroft in late 1825, in Mazar, Afghanistan.

An abridged version of the journals of Moorcroft and Trebeck was published posthumously in London in 1841. Called Travels in the Himalayan Provinces of Hindustan and the Punjab in Ladakh and Kashmir in Peshawar, Kabul, Kunduz and Bokhara From 1819 to 1825 (in two volumes), it remains the sole literary legacy of the duo.
