= Tar, Hungary =

Tar
- Village
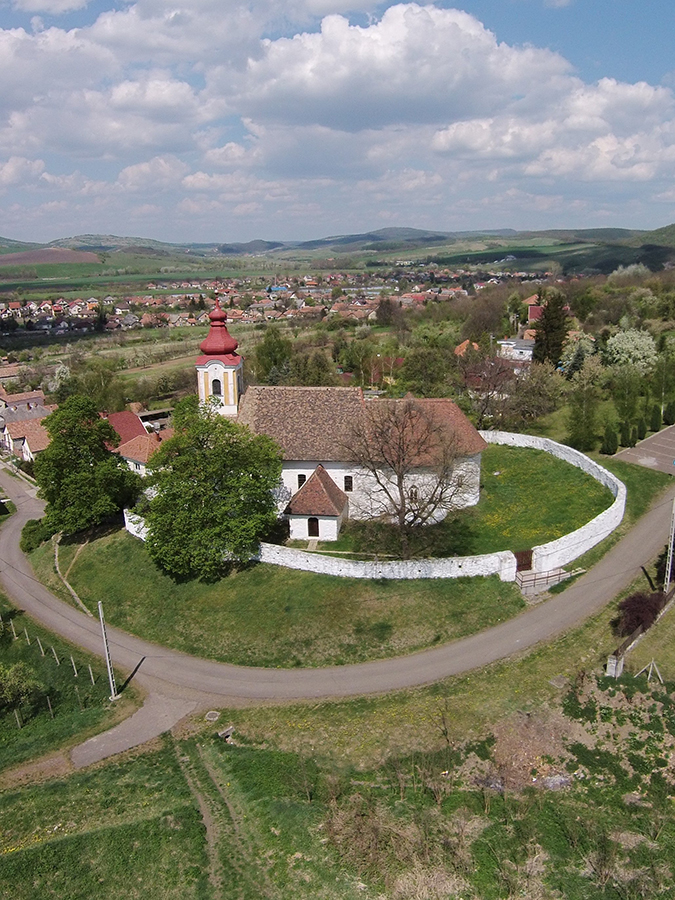
- Saint Michael Church

- Flag Coat of arms

- Location in Hungary
- Coordinates: 47°57′02″N 19°44′29″E
- Country: Hungary
- County: Nógrád
- District: Pásztó
- First mentioned: 1265

Government
  - Mayor: Zsolt Turopoli (Ind.)

Area
  - Total: 27.34 km^{2} (10.56 sq mi)

Population (2022)
  - Total: 1,790
  - Density: 65.5/km^{2} (170/sq mi)
- Time zone: UTC+1 (CET)
  - Summer (DST): UTC+2 (CEST)
- Postal code: 3073
- Area code: 32
- Website: www.tarkozseg.hu

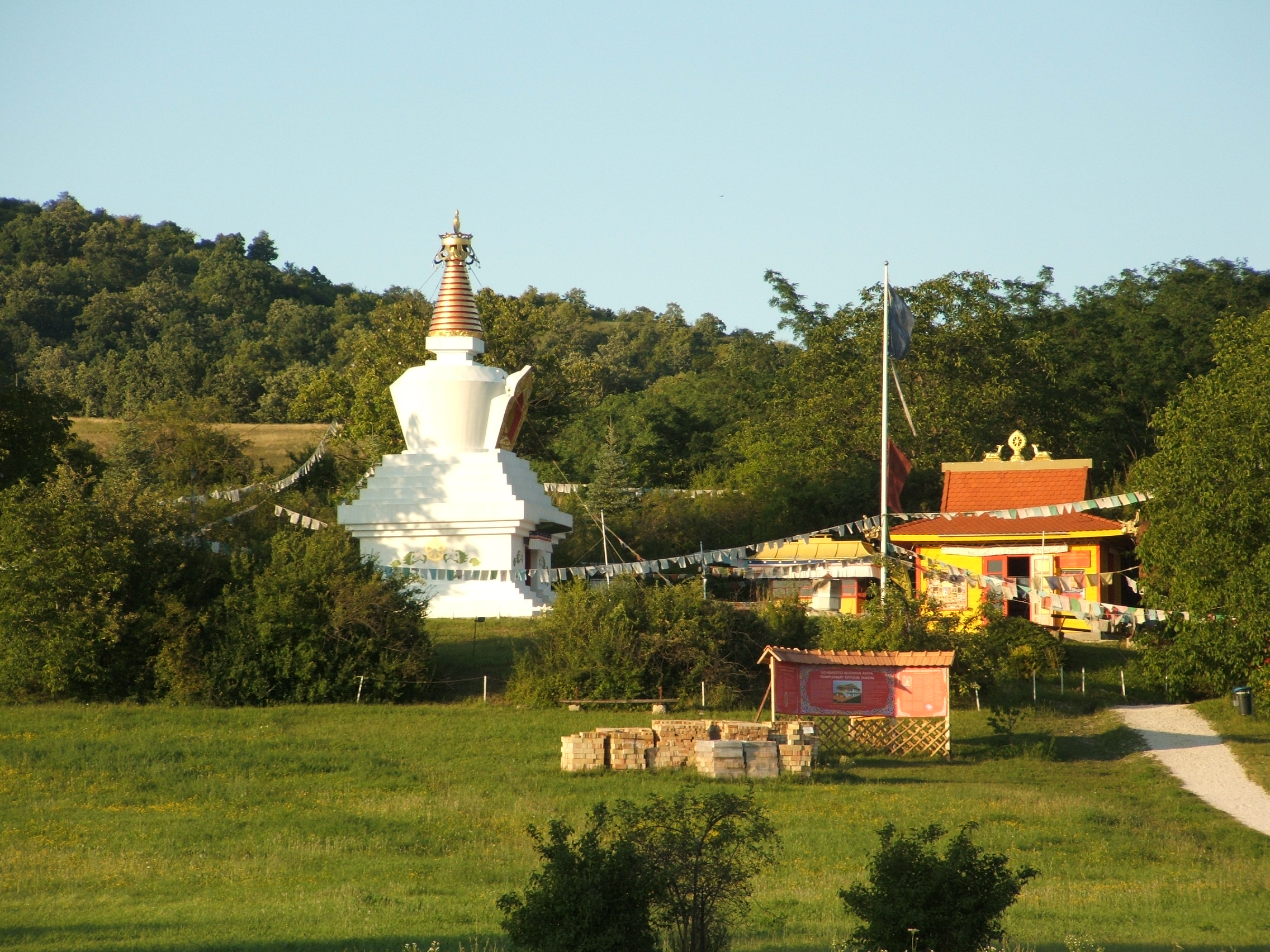
Stupa of Sándor Kőrösi Csoma

Tar is a village in Nógrád County, Hungary, beside of the Zagyva river, between the Cserhát and Mátra mountain ranges. As of 2022 census, it has a population of 1790 (see Demographics). The (Nr. 81) Hatvan–Fiľakovo railway line goes through the village, which is located beside the main road 21 and 34.4 km away from the M3 motorway. The village have its own railway station with public transport.

== History ==
The first written mention of the settlement dates from 1265, when the village belonged to the Rátót genus, from which the Tari family also originates. St. Michael's Church was built in the 13th century, which was expanded by Lőrinc Tari and a manor house was built nearby. In the 15th century, the settlement was given the status of a market town. The Ottomans destroyed the manor house in 1559, but the church remained. The ruins of the manor house are still visible today. In the 18th century, the church was rebuilt in the Baroque style. The church's wall paintings, significant art historical monuments, and the appearance of elements in the Roman, Gothic, Baroque and Classicist styles give its architectural value. It was owned by the Esterházy, Drašković, Reviczky and Almásy families until the 19th century. In the fire of 1880, 76 houses burned down. The population lived from agriculture. After the opening of the Bátonyterenye mines, commuting began. The settlement's own cooperative existed until 1975, after 1996 private farms became the main form in the capital-poor agriculture of the village. A doctor's office were built in 1975, and the pharmacy was opened in 1978. In 1980, the post office and community center were built. The current building of the primary school was built in 1994. The Dalai Lama inaugurated the stupa of Sándor Kőrösi Csoma next to main road 21 in 1992. The Hungarian orientalist was declared a bodhisattva in 1933.

In July 2023, the "Sándor Kőrösi Csoma Center for Scythian and Hungarian Spirituality" was opened in the Buddha park created here. In December 2023, the National Assembly rejected the initiative supported by 1371 signatures, which would have declared the Scythians as an indigenous minority. In January 2024, the police arrested 11 people who declared an armed struggle against the Hungarian state and wanted to create a "Scythian Hungary".

== Demographics ==
According the 2022 census, 87.2% of the population were of Hungarian ethnicity, 13.8% were Gypsies and 12.8% were did not wish to answer. The religious distribution was as follows: 51.8% Roman Catholic, 1.4% Lutheran, 1.0% Calvinist, 9.6% non-denominational, and 33.5% did not wish to answer. The Gypsies have a local nationality government. 1802 people live in the village and 23 persons live in 4 farms.

Population by years:

Year	1870	1880	1890	1900	1910	1920	1930	1941
Population	1321	1205	1256	1389	1705	1900	2156	2203
Year	1949	1960	1970	1980	1990	2001	2011	2022
Population	2287	2466	2654	2552	2332	2058	1926	1790

== Politics ==
Mayors since 1990:

- 1990–2006: Lajos Becze (independent)
- 2006–2014: István Román (independent)
- 2014–: Zsolt Turopoli (independent)
