= Ernő Hetényi =

Ernő Hetényi (a.k.a. Ernest Hetényi 1912–1999) was a Hungarian tibetologist and the leader of the Arya Maitreya Mandala for Eastern Europe.

== Life ==
Heténys father was the operetta composer Albert Hetényi Heidelberg (1875–1951).

Ernő Hetényi was the founder of the Buddhist society of Hungary in 1951. As a disciple of Lama Anagarika Govinda he became leader of the order of the Arya Maitreya Mandala. During Communist government Buddhism as practising religion was not encouraged, but the activity of the Buddhist community was tolerated by the authorities. "In 1956 Dr. Hetényi founded the Alexander Csoma des Körös Institute for Buddhology, the order’s first academic institution in Europe. He has been very successful in strengthening the order’s ties with Buddhist communities and institutions in Mongolia and countries of the former Soviet Union."

Hetényi published numerous books and articles on Buddhism and Tibet. He was also a researcher of the History of Buddhism in Hungary.

== Works ==
- Kőrösi Csoma Sándor dokumentáció. Budapest 1982, ISBN 9789630006385
- Alexander Csoma de Körös. The Hungarian Bodhisattva. Budapest 1984
- A Változás Könyve. Háttér 1989, ISBN 9789637403361
- Tibeti Halottaskönyv. Hatter Kiado 1991, ISBN 978-9637455339
- Tibeti tanítók titkos tanításai. Trivium Kiadó 1996, ISBN 9789637570100
