= Yashodhar Mathpal =

Indian archaeologist, painter, and curator

- Yashodhar Mathpal being felicitated at the ‘International Conference on Rock Art’, 2012
- Born: 6 June 1939 (age 87); Almora
- Occupations: Archaeologist; Painter; Curator; Gandhian; Rock Art Conservationist; Environmentalist
- Known for: Folk Culture Museum (Lok Sanskriti Sangrahalaya), Bhimtal
- Awards: Padma Shri (2006)

Yashodhar Mathpal (born 6 June 1939) is an Indian archaeologist, painter, curator, Gandhian and Rock art conservationist. He is most known for his study of cave art, especially in Bhimbetka rock shelters, Lakhudiyar Caves, Barechhina (Uttarakhand) and Kerala, along with the Folk Culture Museum (Lok Sanskriti Sangrahalaya) in Bhimtal, Nainital district, which he founded in 1983.

He was awarded the Padma Shri, fourth-highest civilian honour by Government of India in 2006.

== Early life and education ==
Mathpal was born in village Naula in Bhikiyasain Tehsil of Almora district of Uttarakhand to Haridutt Mathpal and Kanti Devi. He received his primary education from his native village, thereafter he did further schooling from Manila village, Mission Intercollege, Ranikhet and completed his schooling from Vikramajit Singh Sanatan Dharma College, Kanpur.

He did his B.A. from J. N. P. G. College, Lucknow, followed by an M.A. degree in drawing and painting from Agra University (now known as Dr Bhimrao Ambedkar University) and a PhD in Archaeology from University of Pune (Savitribai Phule Pune University) .

== Folk Culture Museum ==
Pre-historic Cave Paintings at Lakhudiyar Caves, which Mathpal studied

Mathpal established the Folk Culture Museum (Lok Sanskriti Sangrahalaya) in Bhimtal, in the present-day Indian Himalayan state of Uttarakhand, in 1983. The museum is divided into three parts and houses artefacts, paintings, archaeological finds, collections of old coins, vessels, clothes and rare reproductions of Stone Age rock paintings. The museum also documents oral and written traditions of the region, besides providing training in rare traditional arts and crafts. The oldest study items in the museum are marine fossils dating to about 150 million years ago.

Mathpal takes care of the museum with his son, a trained forester, and has spent all his life's earnings on it.

In 2012, he was felicitated by the Vice President of India at the "International Conference on Rock Art", organised by the Indira Gandhi National Centre for the Arts, in New Delhi.

== Bibliography ==
- Yashodhar Mathpal (1984). Prehistoric Rock Paintings of Bhimbetka, Central India. Abhinav Publications. ISBN 978-81-7017-193-5.
- Giacomo Camuri; Angelo Fossati; Yasodhar Mathpal (1993). Deer in Rock Art of India and Europe. Indira Gandhi National Centre for the Arts. ISBN 978-81-85503-02-8.
- Yashodhar Mathpal (1995). Rock Art In Kumaon Himalaya. Indira Gandhi National Centre for the Arts. ISBN 978-81-7305-057-2.
- Yashodhar Mathpal. Samahit. Shree Almora Book Depot. ISBN 978-81-85865-42-3.
- Yashodhar Mathpal (1998). Rock Art In Kerala. Indira Gandhi National Centre for the Arts. ISBN 978-81-7305-130-2.
