= Shailesh Matiyani =

Hindi writer and poet (1931–2001)

- Born: Ramesh Singh Matiyani; 14 October 1931; Barechhina, Almora, Uttarakhand, India
- Died: 24 April 2001 (aged 69); Delhi, India
- Other name: Ramesh Singh Matiyani 'Shailesh'
- Occupations: Writer, poet, essayist

Ramesh Singh Matiyani 'Shailesh', popularly known as Shailesh Matiyani (14 October 1931 – 24 April 2001), was a Hindi writer, poet, essayist from Uttarakhand, India.

He became most known for his short stories, depicting the struggles and the fighting spirit of the Indian lower and lower-middle class, which he embodied himself and expressed through his writings all through his life, and which gave him the title – People's Writer or 'Jankathakar'. And as, Hindi Littérateur, Pankaj Bisht puts it, "how intimate was his depiction of the displaced people from the villages in the urban slums, and those compelled to live and die on footpaths. You won't find this kind of intimacy in any other language. Matiyani's protagonists are beggars, pick-pockets, lumpens, drop-outs, marginalised characters. Fatedness – the lopsided policies of progress – they were its victims; and yet, their inner life was so full of humanism and faith." Today, many writers view his work, second to none other than Premchand himself, though some like Giriraj Kishore, even consider his story writing, beyond him as well.

He wrote over 30 novels, including Ramkali and Suryaasth Kosi, over 17 collections of stories including his most popular stories Maimood, Yada Kada and Ardhangini, 28 collections of stories, seven collections of folk tales, apart from writing numerous essays and over 16 books for children.

In 1994, he was awarded an honorary degree of D.Litt. by Kumaun University, Nainital.

== Biography ==
Ramesh Singh Matiyani 'Shailesh' was born on 14 October 1931 in Barechhina, Almora district, Uttarakhand; it was here and later at Almora that he studied up to High School. He did his higher studies in Allahabad with his younger cousin, Prem Matiyani, who later became a theatre director.

His first novel, Borivilli se Boribander tak was published in 1959, and in his career spanning five decades, he wrote numerous short stories and novels and published many collections of stories and essays. He was also known for his stories for children. He remained the editor of two publications, Janpaksh and Vikalp, for many years. Thereafter, he moved to Haldwani, where he spent the rest of his years, though suffering a depression attack in July 1995, he often travelled to Delhi and Lucknow, for treatment, despite that he continued writing prolifically. He was awarded Mahapandit Rahul Sankrityayan Award for his contribution to Hindi Literature in 2000.

He died on 24 April 2001, in Delhi and was cremated at Haldwani. After his death, 'Shailesh Matiyani Smriti Katha Puraskar' was established by the Madhya Pradesh Government.

'किसके राम कैसे राम' was written by him

== Bibliography ==
"लिखना, लेखक होना – अपने मानवीय स्वत्व के लिए संघषॆ करने का ही दूसरा नाम है, और जब यह दूसरों के लिए संघषॆ करने के विवेक से जुड़ जाता है, तभी लेखक सही अथों में साहित्यकार बन पाता है।"
— शैलेश मटियानी

- Shailesh Matiyani Ki Sampurna Kahaniyan 5 Vols.
- Shailesh Matiyani ki Ikkyavan Kahaniyan (Hindi), Vibhor Prakashan, Allahabad
- Bhage hue log, (Hindi). Ashu Prakasan,1143/31 old katra, Allahabad 1994.
- Suhagini tatha Anya kahaniyan (Hindi). Ashu Prakasan,1143/31 old katra, Allahabad
- Kise pata hai rashtriy sharm ka matlab (Hindi-Lekh). Ashu Prakasan,1143/31 old katra, Allahabad
- Ugte suraj ki Kiran (Hindi -Novel). Ashu Prakasan,1143/31 old katra, Allahabad
- 10 Pratinidhi Kahaniyan. ISBN 978-81-7016-380-0.
- Kanya Tatha Anya Kahaniyan (Hindi). ISBN 81-88266-40-X.
- Shreshtha Anchalik Kahaniya (Hindi), 2001, Kadamabari Prakashan. ISBN 81-85050-73-2.
- Parvat Se Sagar Tak. ISBN 978-81-7028-376-8.
- Aakash Kitna Anant Hai. OCLC 844895459.
- Trijya. OCLC 17149724.
- Rastrbhasha ka Sawal (Hindi- Lekh). Ashu Prakasan,1143/31 old katra, Allahabad 1994. ISBN 81-85377-04-9.
- Kagaz ki Naav (Collection of essays) Ashu Prakasan,1143/31 old katra, Allahabad.
- Koi Ajnabi Nahin, Manjil Sar Manjil (Hindi), Delhi, Granth Academy, 2006. ISBN 81-88267-45-7.
- Yada Kada, (Hindi), 1992.
- Kohra (Novel)
- Uthaigir, (Play)
- Chhote-Chhote Pakshi (Novel).
- Gopuli Gafooran (Novel).
- Maimood, Modern Hindi Short Stories; translated by Jai Ratan. New Delhi, Srishti, 2003, Chapter 11. ISBN 81-88575-18-6.
- Choti machali Badi machali, AtmaRam & Sons. 2002.
- Parvat Se Sagar Tak, Rajpal & Sons, ISBN 978-81-7028-376-8.
- Billi ke Bachche (Hindi-Bal sahitya). Ashu Prakasan,1143/31 old katra, Allahabad
- Maa ki wapsi (Hindi-Bal sahitya). Ashu Prakasan,1143/31 old katra, Allahabad
- Kali paar ki lokkathaen (Hindi-Bal sahitya). Ashu Prakasan,1143/31 old katra, Allahabad

== See also ==
- List of Indian writers
- Shekhar Joshi
- शैलेश मटियानी, अर्धांगिनी और दाम्पत्य-प्रेम संजय राय

== Works online ==
- Yada Kada by Shailesh Matiyani (1992) at Digital Library of India – Hindi.
- A collection of Essays. by Shailesh Matiyani – Hindi
- Bhasha aur Desh, an essay by Shailesh Matiyani – Hindi
- Maimood, a story by Shailesh Matiyani – Hindi
- Ardhangini, a story by Shailesh Matiyani – Hindi
