= Prem Matiyani =

Indian theatre director and arts administrator

- Prem Matiyani in 2006.
- Born: 11 June 1950; Pandetoli, Almora district, Uttar Pradesh, India (now Uttarakhand)
- Died: 13 September 2016 (aged 66); Delhi, India
- Education: National School of Drama; University of Leeds
- Occupations: Theatre director; Arts administrator
- Awards: Sangeet Natak Akademi Award (2001)

Prem Matiyani (11 June 1950 – 13 September 2016) was an Indian theatre director, actor and arts administrator. He served as director of the Song and Drama Division of the Ministry of Information and Broadcasting and held additional charge as director of the Film and Television Institute of India (FTII), Pune. He received the Sangeet Natak Akademi Award in 2001.

== Biography ==
=== Early life and education ===
Matiyani was born on 11 June 1950 in Pandetoli, near Barechhina in Almora district, in present-day Uttarakhand. He was the fourth-born in a family of five brothers. His father was Sunder Matiyani. He completed his schooling in Barechhina before moving to Allahabad with his cousin, Hindi writer Shailesh Matiyani, where he graduated from the Allahabad University in 1972. Next, he joined the National School of Drama, Delhi and graduated in 1976. He subsequently received a Commonwealth Scholarship in 1985–86 to study theatre at the University of Leeds, England, where he received a master's degree in theatre studies.

=== Career ===
Matiyani started his career in the traditional theatre of Uttarakhand. He remained part of the 'National School of Drama Repertory Company' as in an actor, from 1976 to 1983, and took part in plays including Skandagupta, Begum ka Takia, Sainya Bhaye Kotwal, Mahabhoj, Chhote Saiyed Badey Saiyed, The Fool, Uncle Vanya, and Mena Gurjari. He joined the Song and Drama Division of the Ministry of Information and Broadcasting as an assistant director in 1983. He became its director in 1991 and also held additional charge as director of the Film and Television Institute of India, Pune, from 2002. During his tenure, he is credited with restoring institutional stability following student unrest and introducing short-term television courses.

He directed sound-and-light productions including Yugpurush, Samar Yatra and Shatroopa. He retired as director of the Song and Drama Division in 2010.

He was associated with the Delhi-based cultural organisation, 'Parvatiya Kala Kendra', for many years, directing theatre in Kumaoni and Garhwali languages. Later, he also served as president of the organisation. Over the years, he several conducted theatre workshops in Nainital, and directed the sound-and-light productions Dharohar and Manzilein Aur Bhi Hain at the Nainital Sharadotsav (Autumn Festival) in 2000 and 2001.

In 2002, Matiyani took additional charge as director of the Film and Television Institute of India (FTII), Pune

At the 50th National Film Awards, he received the National Film Award for Best Film on Social Issues as producer (Films Division) of the film Avchetan.

== Personal life ==
Matiyani had a wife, with whom he had two sons. He died in Delhi on 13 September 2016, aged 66. At the 2017 Bharat Rang Mahotsav (National Theatre Festival), the National School of Drama announced a theatrical tribute to Matiyani.

== See also ==
- Mohan Upreti
