= Shekhar Joshi =

Indian writer (1932–2022)

- Born: 10 September 1932; Oliyagaon, Almora, United Provinces, British India
- Died: 4 October 2022 (aged 90)
- Occupations: Novelist, poet
- Writing career
- Notable works: Dajyu, Kosi Ka Ghatwar

Shekhar Joshi (10 September 1932 – 4 October 2022) was an Indian Hindi author, who was also known for his insight into the culture, traditions and lifestyles of people of Uttarakhand. With Shailesh Matiyani, he created a composite image of ethos of Kumaon. His best-known works are Dajyu (Big Brother) and Kosi Ka Ghatwar (The Miller of Kosi). Along with Sumitranandan Pant, he is considered to be the most influential writer of Kumaon.

== Biography ==
Shekhar Joshi was born on 10 September 1932 in the village of Oliyagaon, Almora district, Uttarakhand. His family were farmers and he received his early education at Dehradun and Ajmer. While studying in intermediate school, he was selected for entry to the Defence Institute of IMA. He worked there from 1955 to 1986, when he resigned to take up full-time writing.

Joshi's acclaimed story, Dajyu has been made into a children’s film by the Children's Film Society of India. Kosi Ka Ghatwar and many other stories have been translated into English, Russian, Czech, Polish and Japanese.

== Bibliography ==
- 10 Pratinidhi Kahaniyan (Hindi), ISBN 978-81-267-0314-2.
- Naurangi Bimar Hai Rajkamal Publications.
- The Miller of Kosi Modern Hindi Short Stories; translated by Jai Ratan. New Delhi, Srishti, 2003, Chapter 5. ISBN 81-88575-18-6.
- Bachche Ka Sapna 2004 (Hindi). ISBN 81-86209-44-1.
- Dangri Vale 1998.
- Mera Pahar
- "Big Brother" (Dajyu), Andersen 1994.
