= Uttarakhand Residential University =

University in Uttarakhand, India

- Type: Public
- Established: 2016
- Affiliations: UGC
- Chancellor: Governor of Uttarakhand
- Vice-Chancellor: H. S. Dhami
- Location: Almora, Uttarakhand, India
- Website: Official website

Uttarakhand Residential University (URU), also known as Uttarakhand Aawasiya Vishwavidyalaya, was a state university located at Almora, Uttarakhand, India. It was established in 2016 by the Government of Uttarakhand through the Uttarakhand Aawasiya Vishwavidyalaya Act, 2016 (Act No. 20 of 2016). It was the second residential university in Uttarakhand following Doon University, and modeled after Jawaharlal Nehru University. The first Vice-Chancellor (VC) was H. S. Dhami, formerly VC of Kumaun University.

== Courses offered ==
The university offers several undergraduate and postgraduate level courses and programs in science, arts, engineering, IT, management, law, design, etc. including doctoral programs in the same.
