= Lakhudiyar Caves =

Indian caves decorated with prehistoric paintings

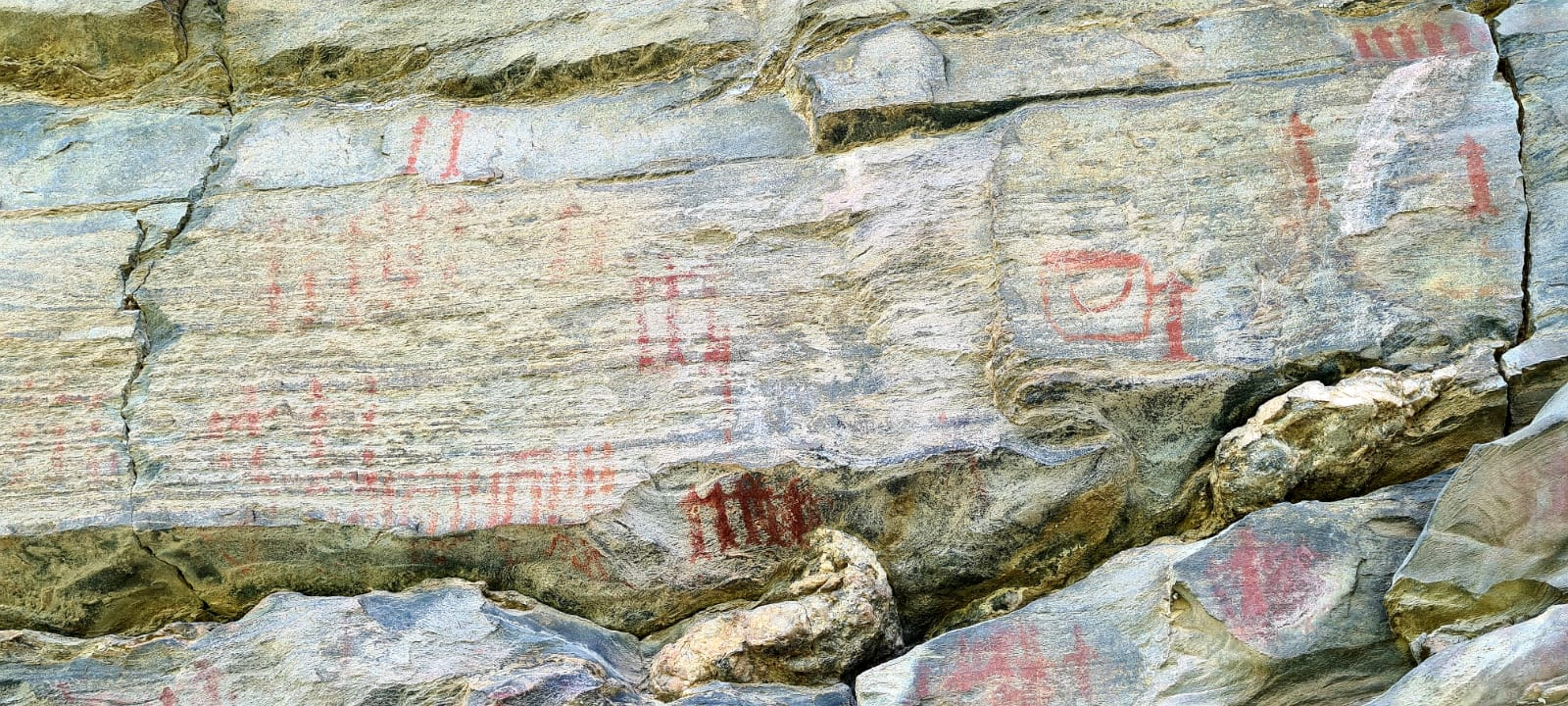
Rectangle designs at Lakhudiyar Caves.

The Lakhudiyar Caves, also known as the Lakhudiyar rock shelters, are a group of prehistoric painted rock shelters near Barechhina in the Almora district of Uttarakhand, India. Situated along the Suyal River, approximately 20 kilometres from Almora, the shelters contain prehistoric rock art depicting animals, humans and also tectiforms, created with fingers in black, red and white. There are also a few animal motifs, one of them closely resembling a fox. Wavy lines, rectangle-filled geometric designs and groups of dots are seen here. These paintiings have now become a tourist attraction as well.

The caves at Lakhudiyar were first brought to archaeological attention in 1968 by M. P. Joshi and other researchers. The paintings have been associated with different prehistoric periods, including the Mesolithic and megalithic cultural phases.

== History ==
Ancient Cave Paintings at Lakhudiyar

Lakhudiyar is a rock shelter which were the rescue spot of early man to save them from harsh climate. Lakhudiyar means 'one lakh caves'. These walls depict the life and the surroundings of early man.

== Location ==
Barechhina is situated at 29°38′32″N 79°44′51″E. This village is about 19 kilometres (12 mi) far from main Almora city.

== Paintings ==
The paintings are mostly drawings of people, animals and weapons used by early man. On one side of the wall is the painting of people who have been shown performing a mass dance in a group of 34 people on one side and 28 people on the other. These picture also depicted the clothes and domesticated animals, and is believed to represent life in the prehistoric village. Two painted rock shelters reveal paintings of animals and humans drawn with fingers in black, red and white.

These images have now become a tourist attraction. It is also the site for archaeological rock engraving being studied by Indira Gandhi National Centre for the Arts, which is located in New Delhi.

== Gallery ==
Panoramic View of Lakhudiyar painted Cave shelter

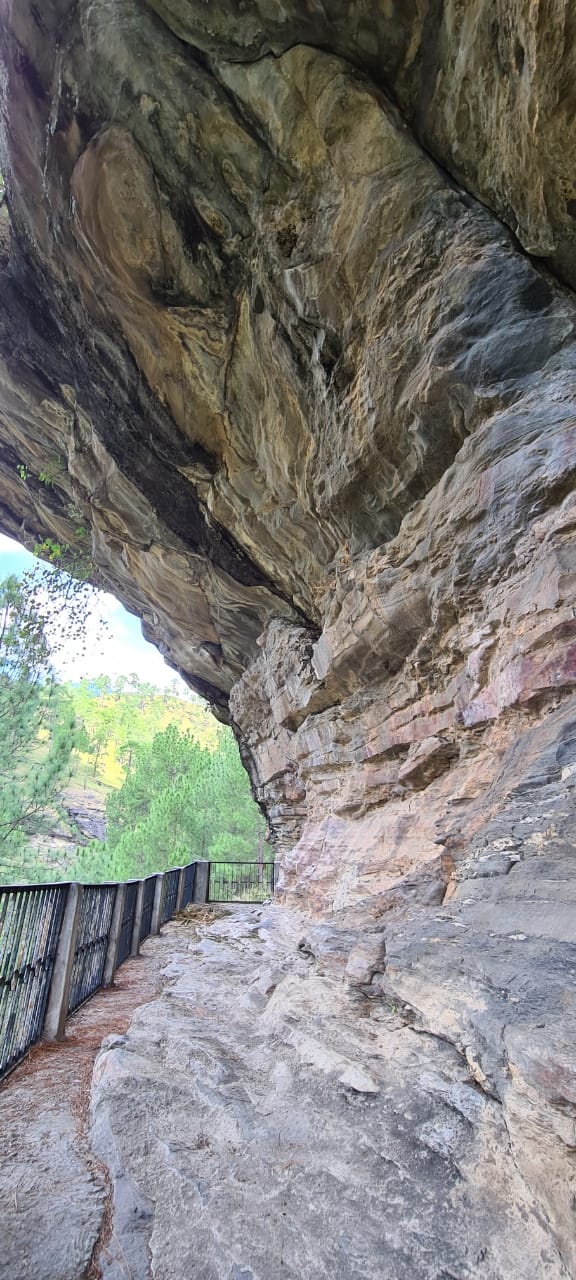
Lakhudiyar caves

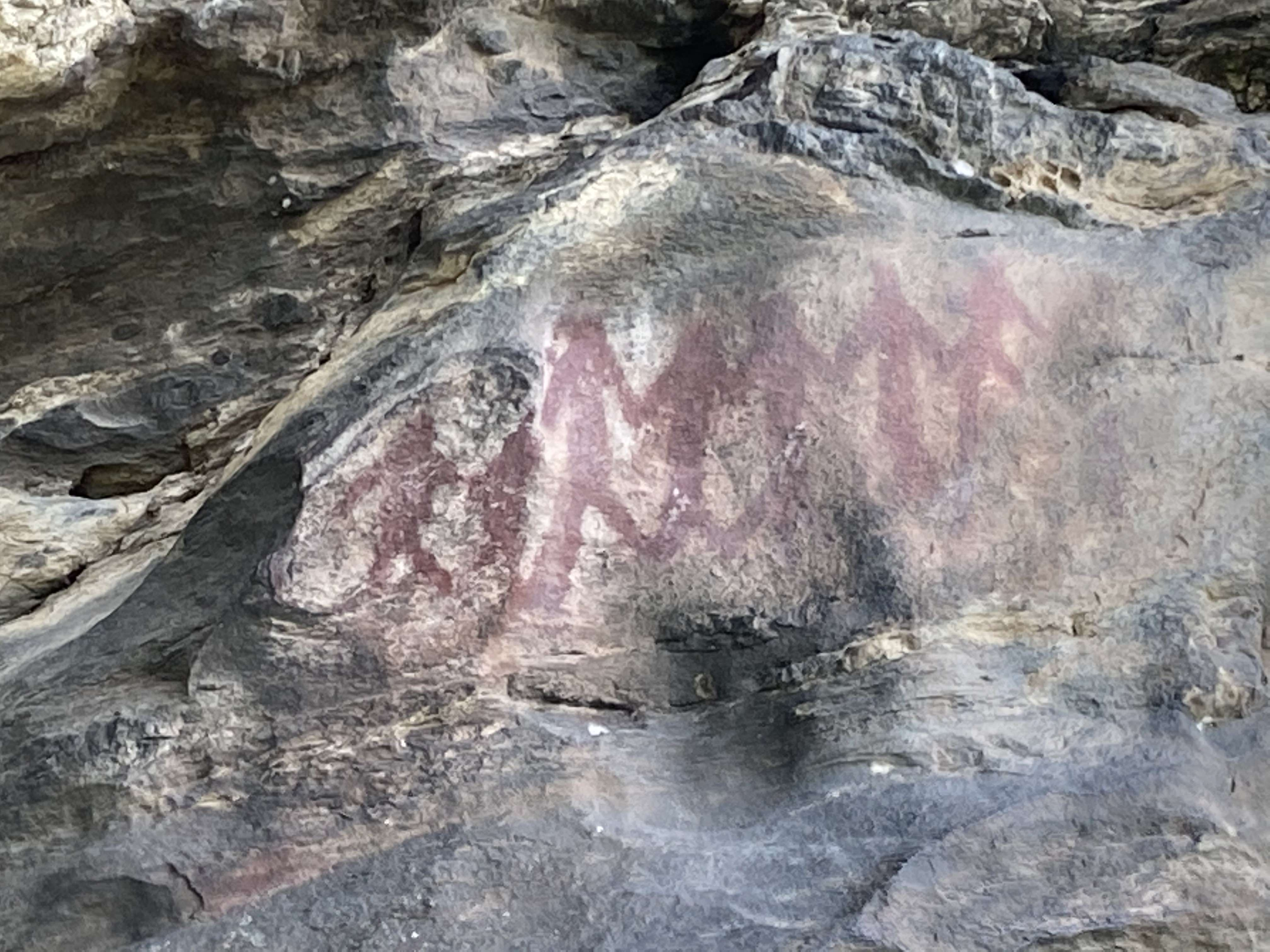
Cave Painting Depicting Hunter-Gatherer, Probably, On Their Way To Collect Wild Plants And Hunt Wild Animals

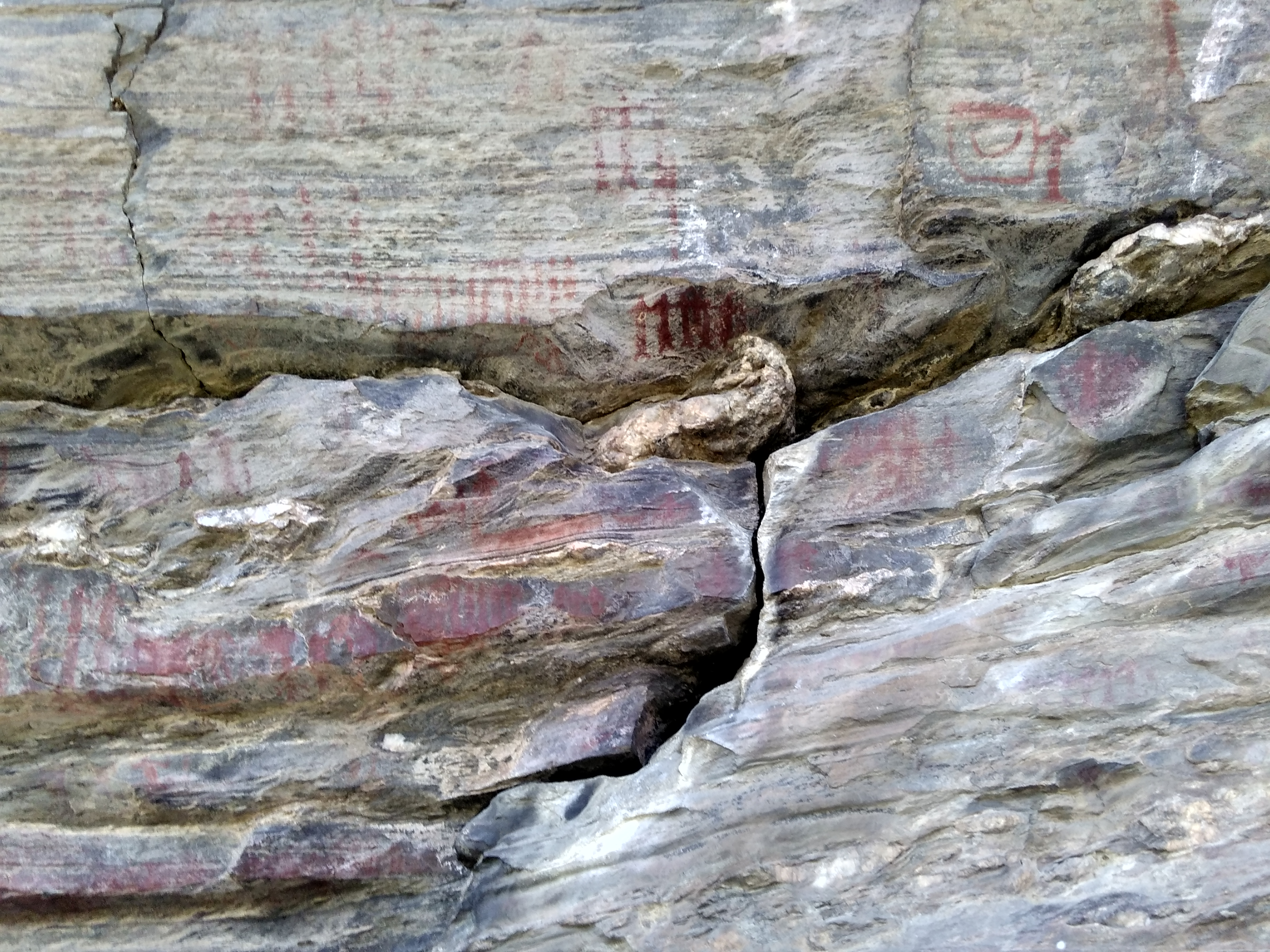
Ancient Cave Paintings at Lakhudiyar

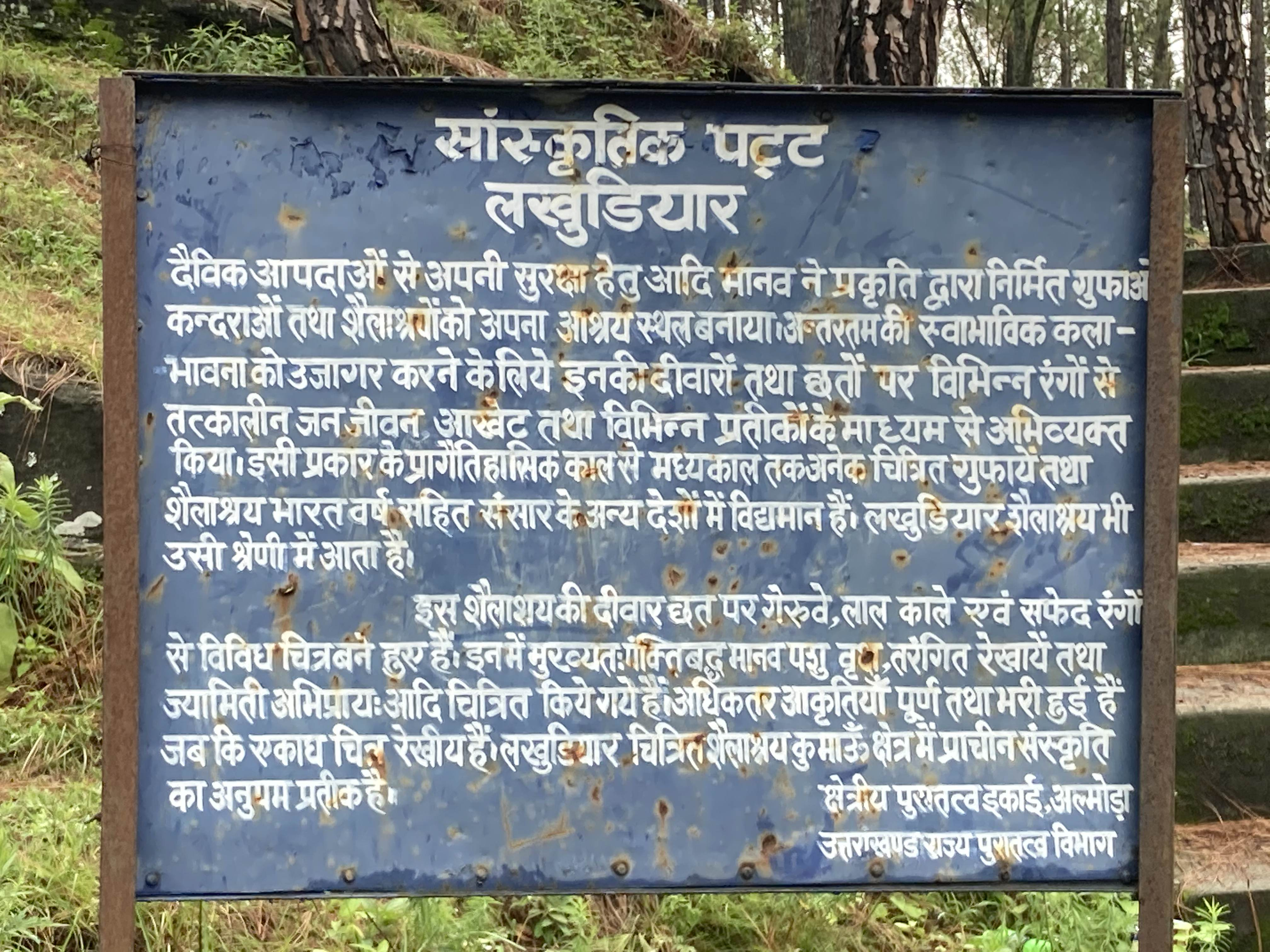
Culture Board depicting details on painted rock shelters of Lakhudiyar
