= Rudreshwar, Uttarakhand =

Hindu Temple in Uttarakhand

Rudreshwar is a Hindu pilgrimage centre dedicated to Shiva and home to the Rudreshwar Mahadev Temple in Almora district of Uttarakhand, India. Situated near the bank of the river Ramganga, Rudreshwar Mahadev Temple is only 10 km from Masi and Bhikiyasain. It is one of the ancient temples in Uttarakhand

This temple is just renovated. The temple has excellent look of river Ramganga from the hall. One can reach the temple via Kumaon Motor Owners Union (KMOU) buses from Almora.
