= Barechhina =

Barechhina Sheel
- village
- Location in Uttarakhand, India Barechhina Sheel (India)
- Coordinates: 29.38°N 79.44°E
- Country: India
- State: Uttarakhand
- District: Almora
- Elevation: 1,646 m (5,400 ft)

Languages
  - Official: Hindi & english
- Time zone: UTC+5:30 (IST)
- PIN: 263624
- Telephone code: 91-5962
- Vehicle registration: UK-01
- Climate: Alpine (BSh) and Humid subtropical(Bsh) (Köppen)
- Avg. annual temperature: 28 – −2 °C (82–28 °F)
- Avg. summer temperature: 28–12 °C (82–54 °F)
- Avg. winter temperature: 15 – −2 °C (59–28 °F)
- Website: almora.nic.in

Barechhina is an Indian village in Almora district, Uttarakhand, 18 km from the district headquarters, the city of Almora. . It lies on highway from Almora-Barechhina-Dhaulchina-Sheraghat-RaiAgar-Berinag-Chaukori-Thal-Tejam to Munsiyari.

== Prehistoric art ==
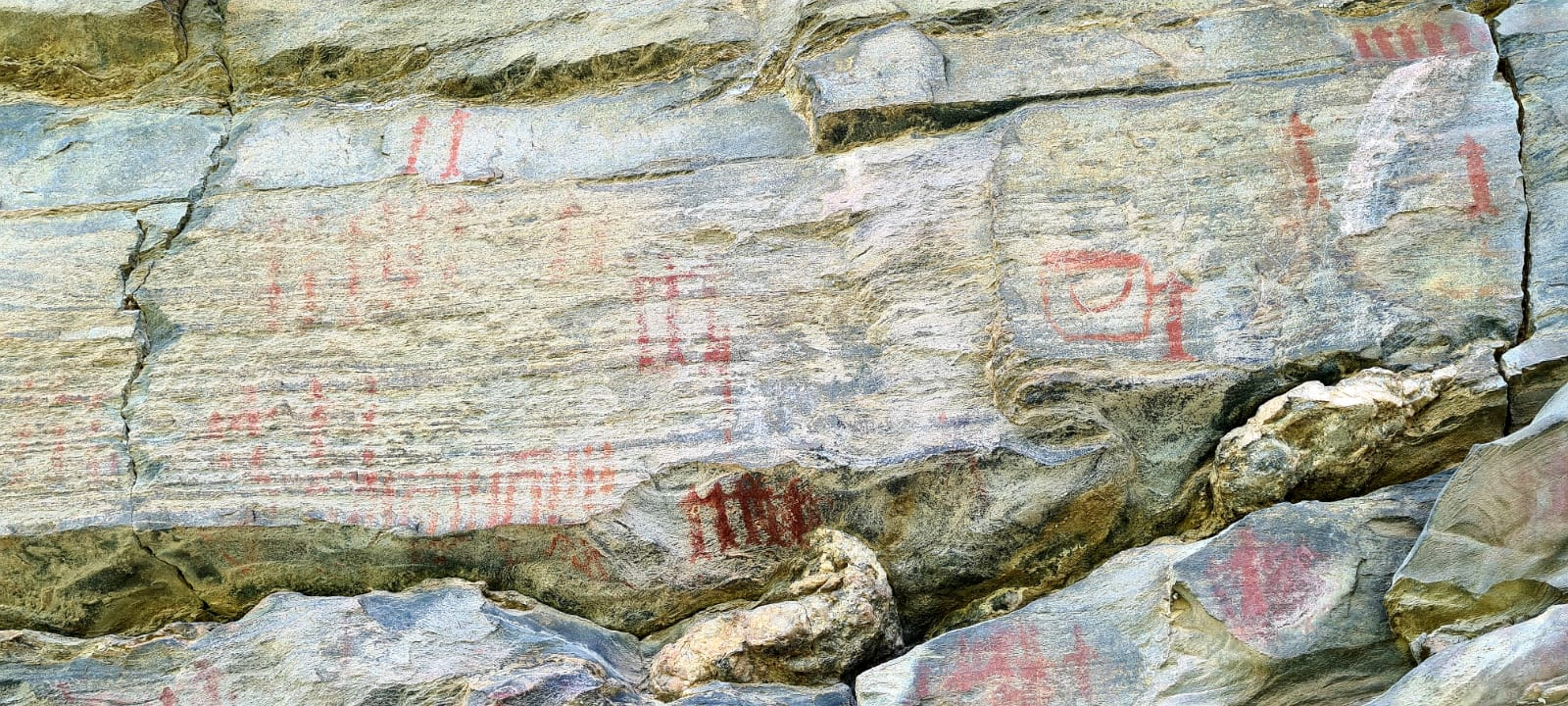
Rectangle designs at Lakhudiyar Caves.

Barechhina is also noted for its two pre-historic painted rock shelters, at 'Lakhudiyar Caves', which literally means 'one lakh caves', on the banks of Suyal river, it has with paintings of animals, humans and also tectiforms done with fingers in black, red and white colours, and engravings of trishul and Swastika.

These images have now become a tourist attraction as well It is also the site for archaeological rock engravings being studied by Indira Gandhi National Centre for the Arts, New Delhi. along with Government Girls' Inter College and other private schools like Maharshi Vidhya Mandir.

== Geography ==
Barechhina is situated at 29°38′32″N 79°44′51″E

== See also ==
- Lakhudiyar Caves
