= Indira Gandhi National Centre for the Arts =

Government-funded arts organisation in New Delhi, India

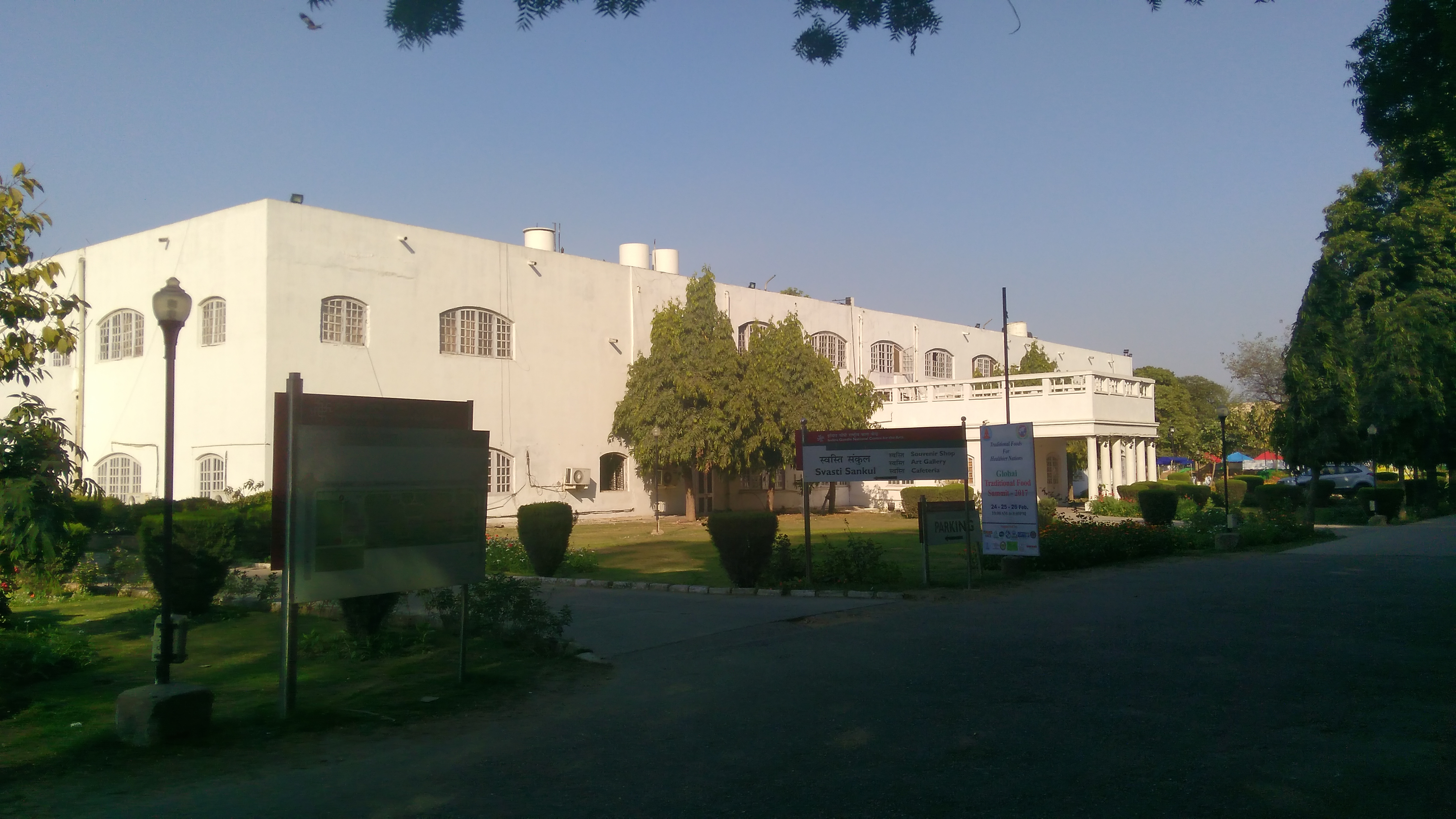
Indira Gandhi National Centre for the Arts, New Delhi.

Indira Gandhi National Centre for the Arts

Indira Gandhi National Centre for the Arts (IGNCA), New Delhi is a premier government-funded arts organisation in India. It is an autonomous institute under the Ministry of Culture.

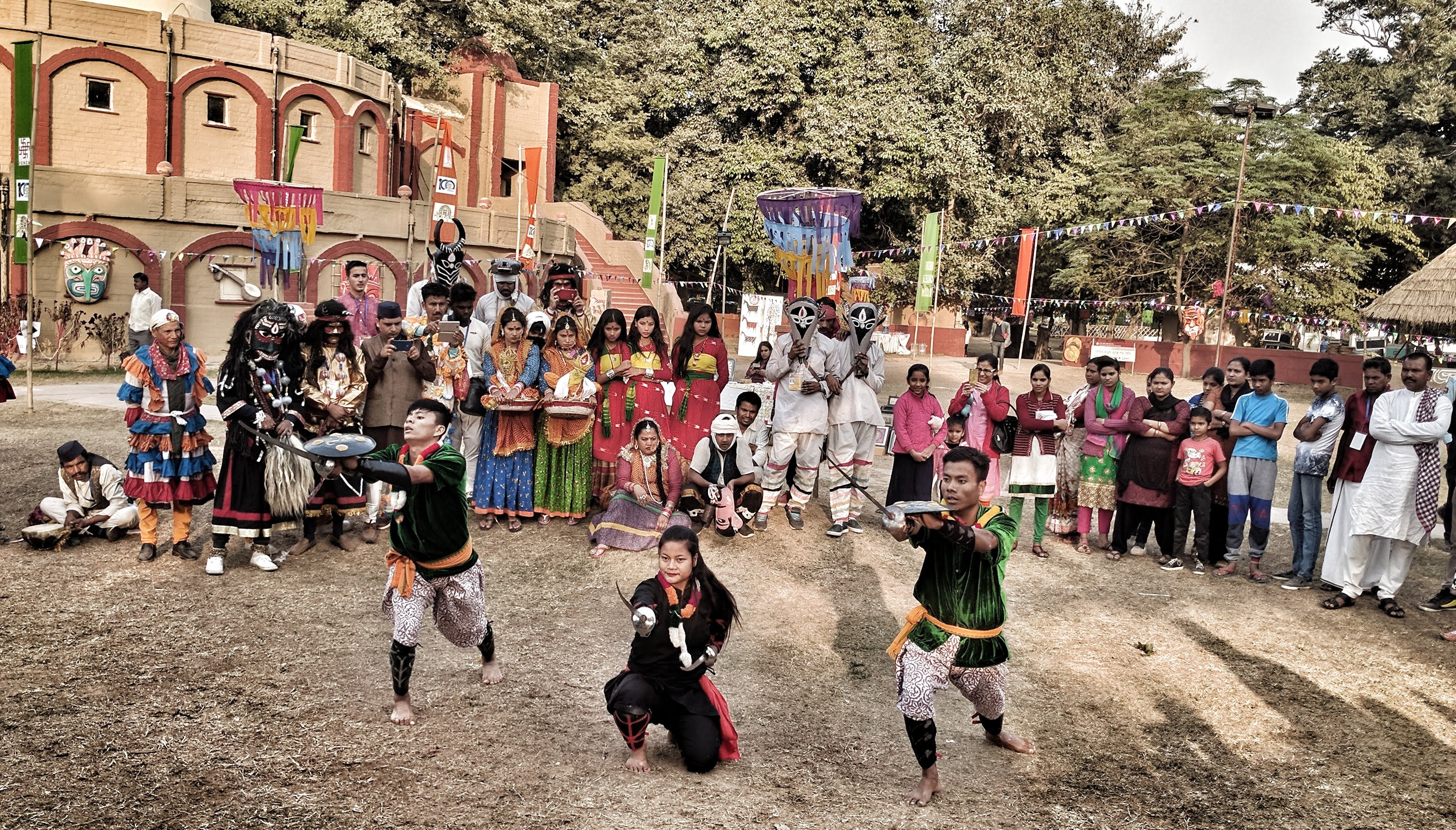
Cultural performances at IGNCA

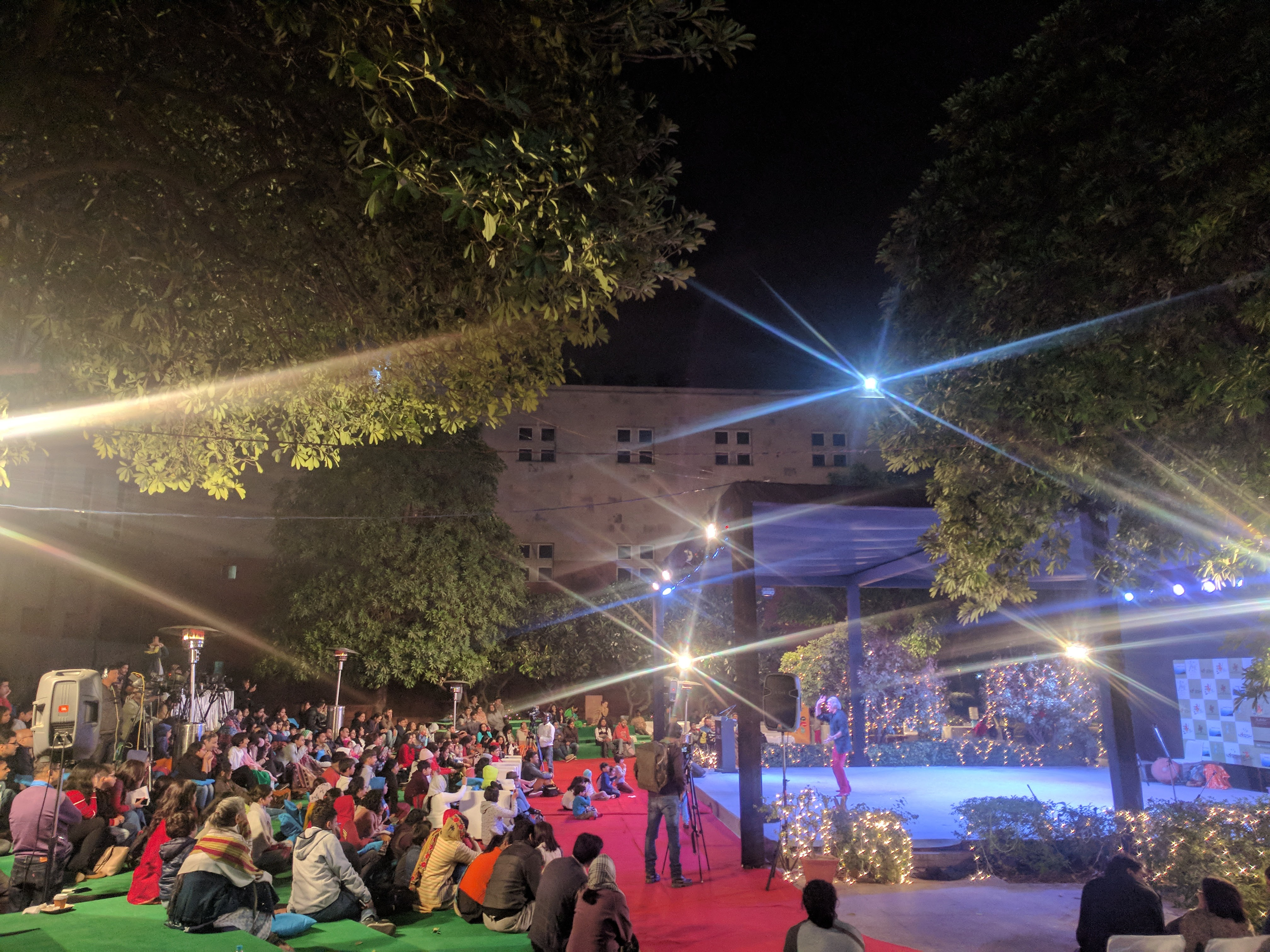
7th edition of three day 'Kathakar: International Storytellers Festival' at Indira Gandhi National Centre for the Arts (IGNCA), New Delhi.

== History ==
The Indira Gandhi National Centre for Arts was launched on 19 November 1985 by prime minister Rajiv Gandhi.

The Indira Gandhi National Centre for the Arts Trust was constituted and registered in New Delhi on 24 March 1987.

- Board of Trustees
- Executive Committee

== About ==
IGNCA is envisioned as an institution dedicated to the study and exploration of various art forms.

IGNCA collaborates with organisations such as the United Nations Development Programme (UNDP).

== Aims and Objectives ==
- to serve as a major resource centre for Indian arts, especially written, oral and visual source materials
- to conduct research on the arts and humanities, and to publish reference works, glossaries, dictionaries and encyclopaedia
- to establish a tribal and folk arts division with a core collection for conducting systematic scientific studies and live presentations
- to provide a forum for dialogue through performances, exhibitions, multi-media projections, conferences, seminars and workshops on traditional and contemporary Indian arts
- to foster dialogue between the arts and current ideas in philosophy, science and technology, with a view toward bridging the gap in intellectual understanding between modern sciences and arts and culture
- to evolve models of research programmes and arts administration pertinent to the Indian ethos
- to elucidate the formative and dynamic factors in the complex web of interactions between diverse social strata, communities and regions
- to interact with other national and international institutions
- to conduct related research in the arts, humanities and culture

== Divisions ==
- Kalanidhi – (कलानिधि) KalaNidhi is a repository of research and reference material in Humanities and the Arts. It has built a massive collection of source material, encapsulating the entire spectrum of textual, visual and auditory data. Within the Indira Gandhi National Centre for Arts (IGNCA).
- Kalakosa - (कलाकोश) Kālakośa is the research and publication division, investigating the intellectual traditions in their dimensions of multi-layers and multi-disciplines
- Janapada Sampada - (जनपद संपदा) Janapada Sampadā, is the division engaged in lifestyle studies. It has a programmatic character classified as Lifestyle Studies, Multi-media Presentation, Events, and Children's World, each with a number of subprograms.
- Kaladarsana - Kalādarśana (कलादर्शन) is the executive unit that transforms researches and studies emanating from the IGNCA into visible forms through exhibitions.
- Cultural Informatics - कल्चरल इन्फॉर्मेटिक्स (सीआईएल) – एक मल्टीमीडिया शोध केन्द्र Cultural Informatics Laboratory where there are applied technology tools for cultural preservation and propagation. Among its projects it is Kalāsampadā (कलासंपदा), a digital repository of content and information integrated with a user-friendly interface, for encompassing and preserving the rare archival collections of the IGNCA.
- Sutradhara - (सूत्राधार) Sutrādhāra is the administrative section, supporting and coordinating all the activities. The Member Secretary is the Executive head of both academic and administrative divisions. It comprises Administration, Finance, Accounts, Services & Supplies and International Dialogue Unit.
- Media Centre – (मीडिया सेंटर) Since the inception of IGNCA, it was envisioned that the centre would develop into a huge digital repository in future. Media Centre has been endeavouring to do audio/visual research documentation and archiving them for prosperity and implementing worldwide dissemination as well.
- Adi Drishya – (आदि-दृश्य ) The Indira Gandhi National Centre for the Arts (IGNCA) has conceived a major academic programme, which relates to exploring artistic manifestations emanating from man's primary sense perceptions. Amongst the senses that lead to aesthetic experience are vision (Drishya) and hearing (Shravya). The rock art forms a crucial component of the Adi Drishya programme.
- Conservation Lab. – (संरक्षण प्रयोगशाला ) Conservation Lab specialises in the areas of preventive conservation, conservation training, conservation of books, manuscripts, paintings, and objects (metals, wooden objects, ethnographic objects, etc.). Conservation Division also undertakes research and documentation projects in the field of cast iron objects and rust converters.
- Academic – (पीजी डिप्‍लोमा पाठ्यक्रम) Ministry of Culture, Government of India set up IGNCA in the year 1987 to explore, study and disseminate Indian arts, revive the dialogue between India and her neighbours, especially in South and Southeast Asia, in the areas pertaining to the arts. Arts encompasses a wide area of studies, such as creative literature – written and oral; visual arts – architecture, sculpture, painting, graphics and general material culture; photography and films; the performing arts – music, dance and theatre; festivals with artistic dimension
- Photo Unit – (फोटो यूनिट )The Photography Unit undertake photo-documentation of various Objects of Cultural Archives, Preparing Preservation copies and Copy Negatives of Photo collections, Regular activities of IGNCA, such as Seminars, Lectures, Workshops, Visits of Dignitaries, Documentation of Exhibitions as and when required also Preparation of Slides for various Divisions for publication purposes and for Lecture Series by Scholars.
