= Almora =

- City
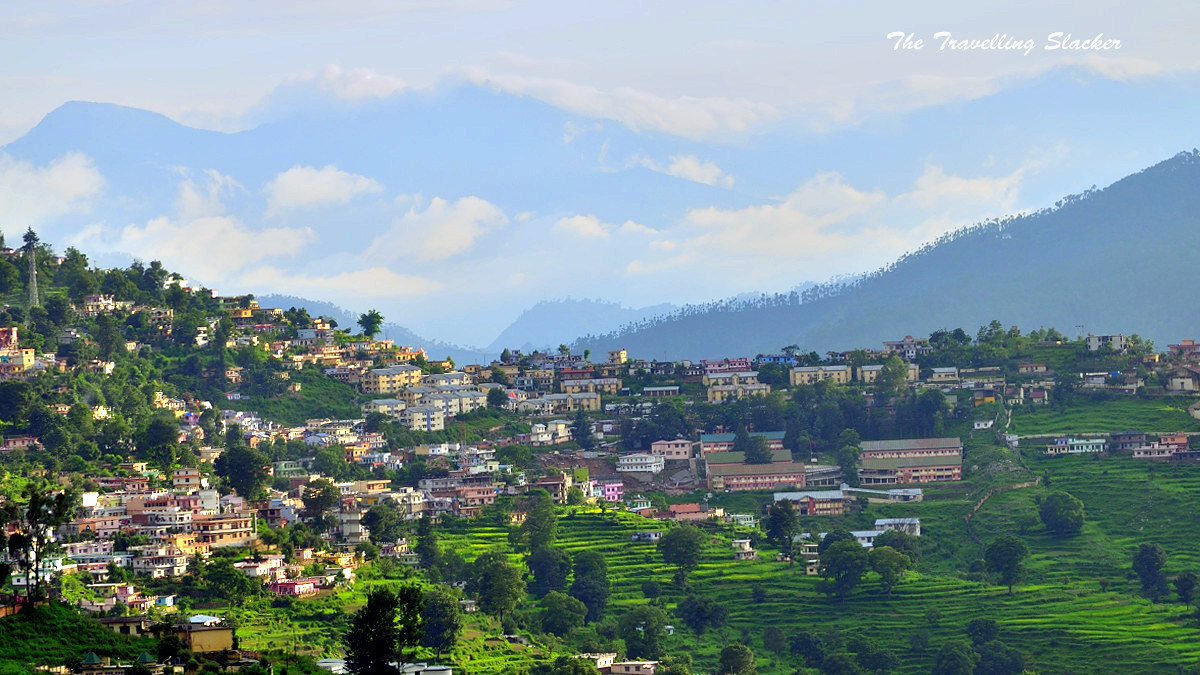
- View of Almora in 2013
- Nicknames: Cultural Capital of Kumaon, Heart of Kumaon
- Location in Uttarakhand, India Almora (India)
- Coordinates: 29.5971°N 79.6591°E
- Country: India
- State: Uttarakhand
- Division: Kumaon
- District: Almora
- Established: 1568
- Founder: Balo Kalyan Chand

Government
  - Type: Municipal Corporation
  - Body: Almora Municipal Corporation
  - Mayor: Ajay Verma (BJP)
  - Lok Sabha MP: Ajay Tamta (BJP)
  - MLA: Manoj Tiwari (INC)
  - Municipal Commissioner: Seema Vishwakarma, IAS

Area
  - Total: 16.60 km^{2} (6.41 sq mi)
- Elevation: 1,642 m (5,387 ft)

Population (2011)
  - Total: 35,513
  - Density: 2,139/km^{2} (5,541/sq mi)
- Demonym: Almoran (English) Almoradi(Kumaoni)

Languages
  - Official: Hindi; Sanskrit
  - Native: Kumaoni
- Time zone: UTC+5:30 (IST)
- PIN: 263601
- Telephone code: 91-5962
- Vehicle registration: UK-01
- Sex ratio: 1142 ♂/♀
- Climate: Alpine (BSh) and Humid subtropical(Cwb) (Köppen)
- Avg. annual temperature: −3 to 28 °C (27 to 82 °F)
- Avg. summer temperature: 12 to 28 °C (54 to 82 °F)
- Avg. winter temperature: −3 to 15 °C (27 to 59 °F)
- Website: almora.nic.in

Almora (Kumaoni: Almāḍ) is a municipal corporation and a cantonment town in the state of Uttarakhand, India. It is the administrative headquarters of Almora district. Almora is located on a ridge at the southern edge of the Kumaon Hills of the Himalaya range. The Koshi (Kaushiki) and Suyal (Salmale) rivers flow along the city and snow-capped Himalayas can be seen in the background.

Almora was founded in 1568. by King Kalyan Chand; however, there are accounts of human settlements in the hills and surrounding region in the Hindu epic Mahabharata (8th and 9th century BCE). Almora was the seat of Chand kings that ruled over the Kumaon Kingdom. It is considered the cultural heart of the Kumaon region of Uttarakhand.

According to the provisional results of the 2011 Census of India, Almora had a population of about 179,000. Nestled within higher peaks of the Himalaya, Almora enjoys a year-round mild temperate climate. There are 11 blocks in Almora district.

== Etymology ==
Almora got its name from Bhilmora, a kind of sorrel (although some have tried to derive it from Berberis "kilmora"), a short plant commonly found there which was used for washing the utensils of the sun temple at Katarmal. The people bringing the Bhilmora/kilmora were called Bhilmori/Kilmori and later "Almori" and the place came to be known as "Almora".

When king Bhishm Chand laid the foundation of the town, he had initially named it Alamnagar. Prior to that, Almora was known as 'Rajapur' during the early phase of Chand rule. The name 'Rajpur' is also mentioned over a number of ancient copper plates. There is still a place called Rajpur in Almora.

== History ==
Almora was founded in 1568 by Kalyan Chand during the rule of the Chand dynasty. Prior to that the region was under the control of Katyuri king Bhaichaldeo who donated a part of Almora to Sri Chand Tiwari.

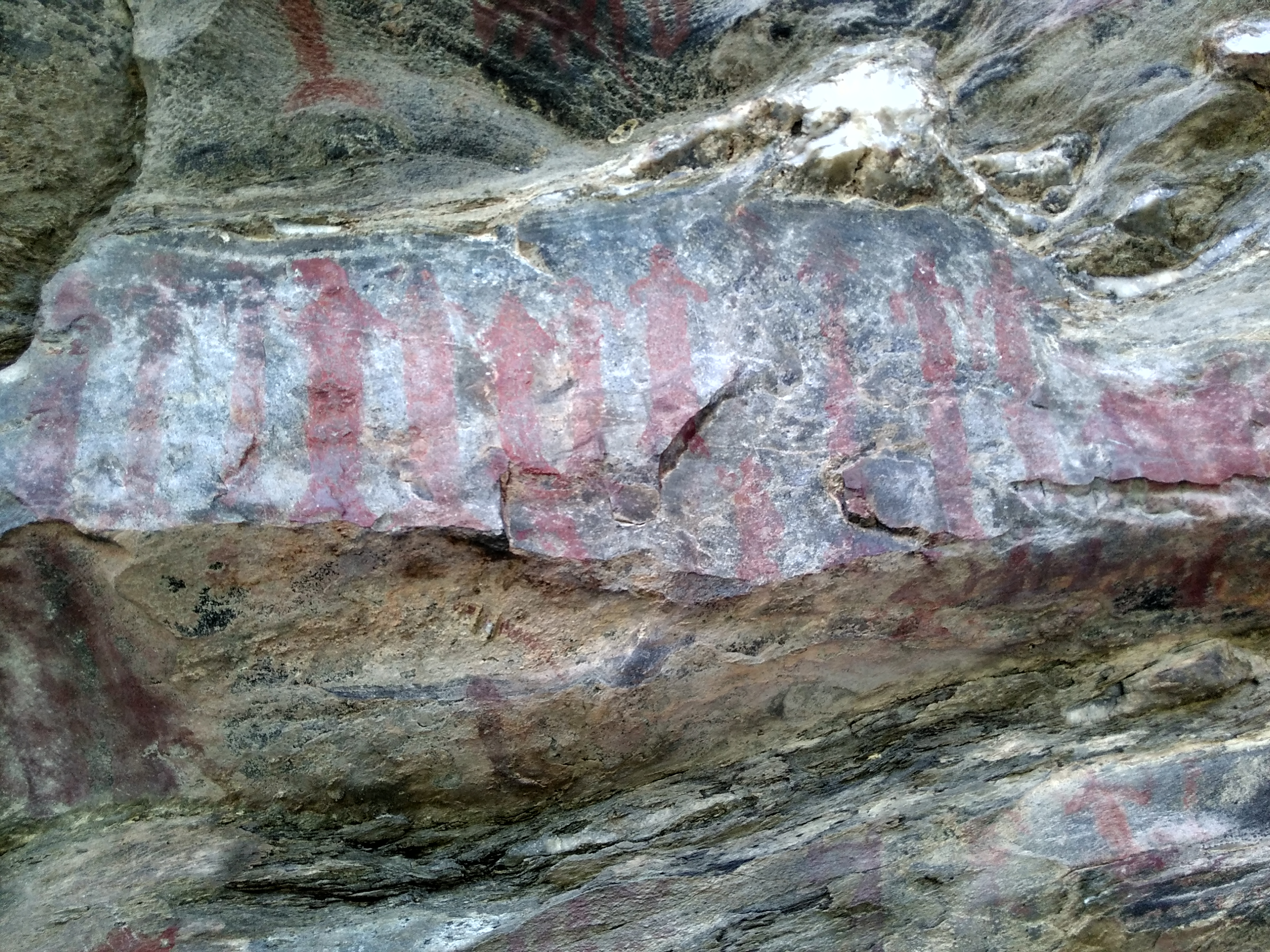
Ancient Paintings at Lakhudiyar Caves

According to local tradition, the earliest inhabitants in Almora were Tewaris who were required to supply Sorrel daily for cleansing the vessels of the sun temple at Katarmal. Ancient lore mentioned in Vishnu Purana and Mahabharata present primordial accounts of human settlements in the city. The Sakas, the Nagas, the Kiratas, the Khasas and the Hunas are credited to be the most ancient tribes. The Kauravas and Pandavas of the Hastinapur royal family were the next important princes from the plains who are said to have affected the conquest of these parts. After the Mahabharata War the district seems to have remained for some time under the sway of the kings of Hastinapur whose authority was never more than nominal. The actual rulers were the local chiefs of whom the Kulindas (or Kunindas) were probably strong in the southern and western part of the city. The Khasas were another ancient people who belonged to an early Aryan stock and were widely scattered in those times. They gave this region the name Khasadesha or Khasamandala.

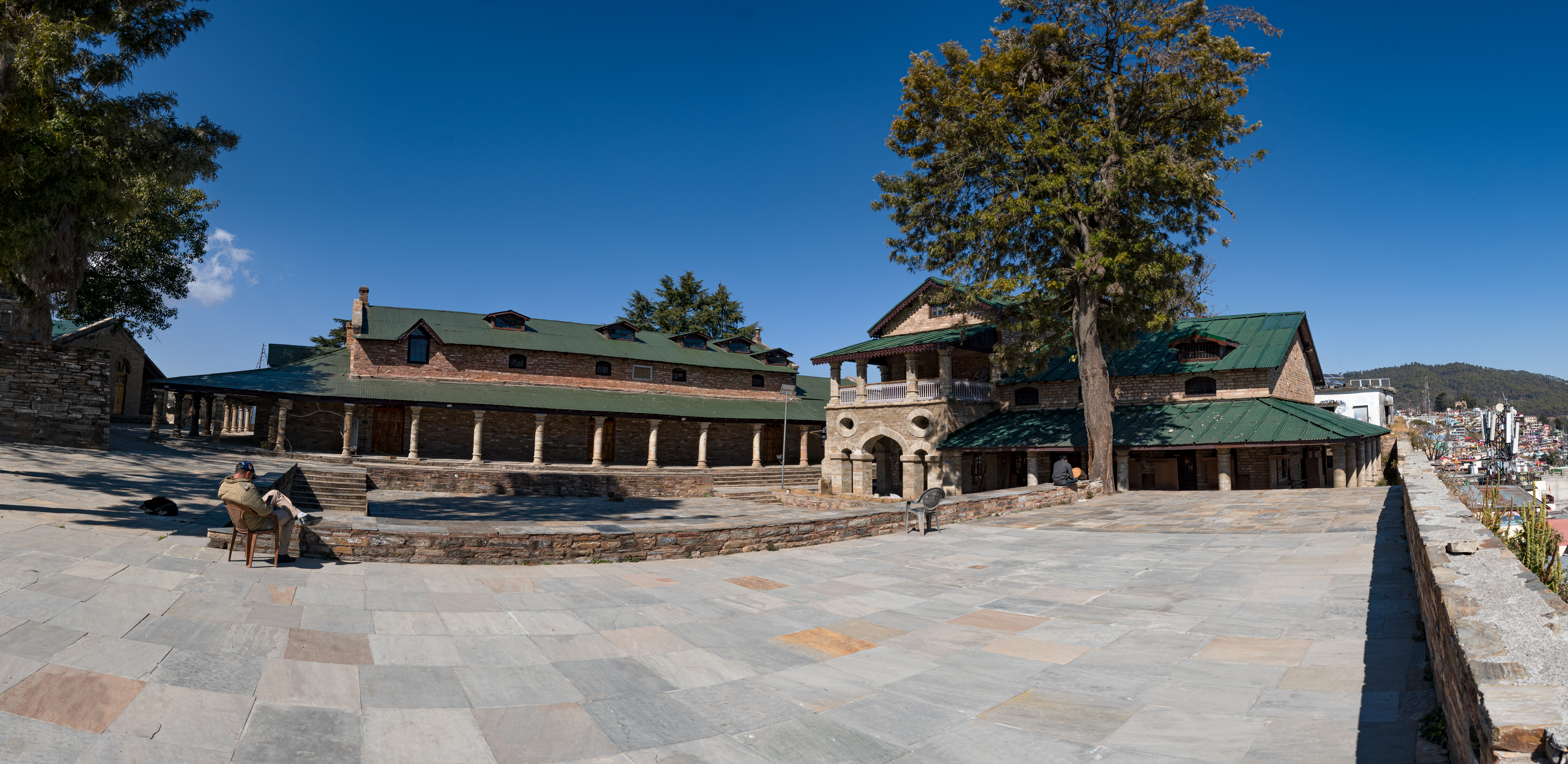
The Malla Mahal at Almora fort complex - the residence of the Chand kings

The next age was probably a period of many petty states rivalling each other for supremacy, which culminated in the inauguration of the noted and enduring dynasty of the Chands. Earlier than this, the Katyuris are recorded as the dominant clans in copper and stone engravings. The Chand dynasty from their inception in 953 A.D. to their ouster in the late 18th century present a saga of strife, with a horrifying series of wars with the rulers of Garhwal culminating in the destruction of this prosperous land and establishment of inglorious Gurkha rule. This dynasty was peculiar in that it made Almora the seat of strongest hill power in 1563 A.D. From that time onwards, the limits of the kingdom of Kumaon extended over the entire tracts of the districts of Almora and Nainital. Towards the end of the 17th century, the Chand Rajas again attacked the Garhwal kingdom, and in 1688, King Udyot Chand erected several temples at Almora, including Tripur Sundari, Udyot Chandeshwer and Parbateshwer, to mark his victory over Garhwal and Doti. The Parbateshwar temple was renamed twice, eventually becoming the present Nanda Devi temple.

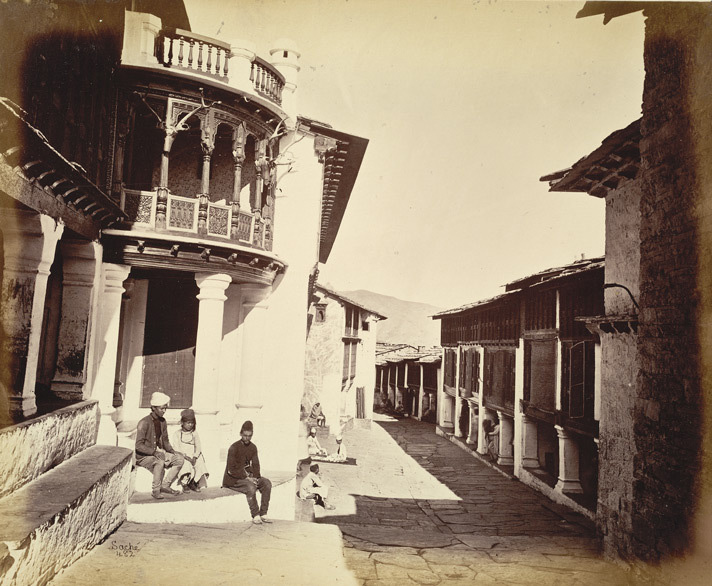
Almora Bazaar, c. 1860

In 1791, the Gorkhas of Nepal while expanding their kingdom westwards across the Kali River, invaded and overran Almora. In the meantime, the British were engaged in preventing the Gorkhas from over-running the whole of the northern frontier. The Gorkha rule lasted for twenty-four years. Due to their repeated intrusion into British territories in the Terai from 1800 onwards, Lord Moira, the Governor-General of India, decided to attack Almora in December 1814, marking the beginning of the Anglo-Gorkha war. The war that broke out in 1814 resulted in the defeat of the Gorkhas and subsequently led to the signing of the Treaty of Sugauli in 1816. According to the treaty, Nepal had to cede all those territories which the Gorkhas had annexed to the British East India Company. After the war, the old Lal Mandi fort, near Almora was renamed ‘Fort Moira’.

Unlike neighbouring hill stations such as Nainital and Shimla, which were developed by the British, Almora was developed long before by the Chand kings. The place where the present cantonment is located was formerly known as Lalmandi. Presently where the collectorate exists, the 'Malla Mahal' (Upper Court) of the Chand kings was located. The site of the present District Hospital used to be 'Talla Mahal' (Lower Court) of the Chand rulers. Almora had a population of 8,596 in 1901, falling to 8,359 in 1921.

== Geography ==
=== Location ===
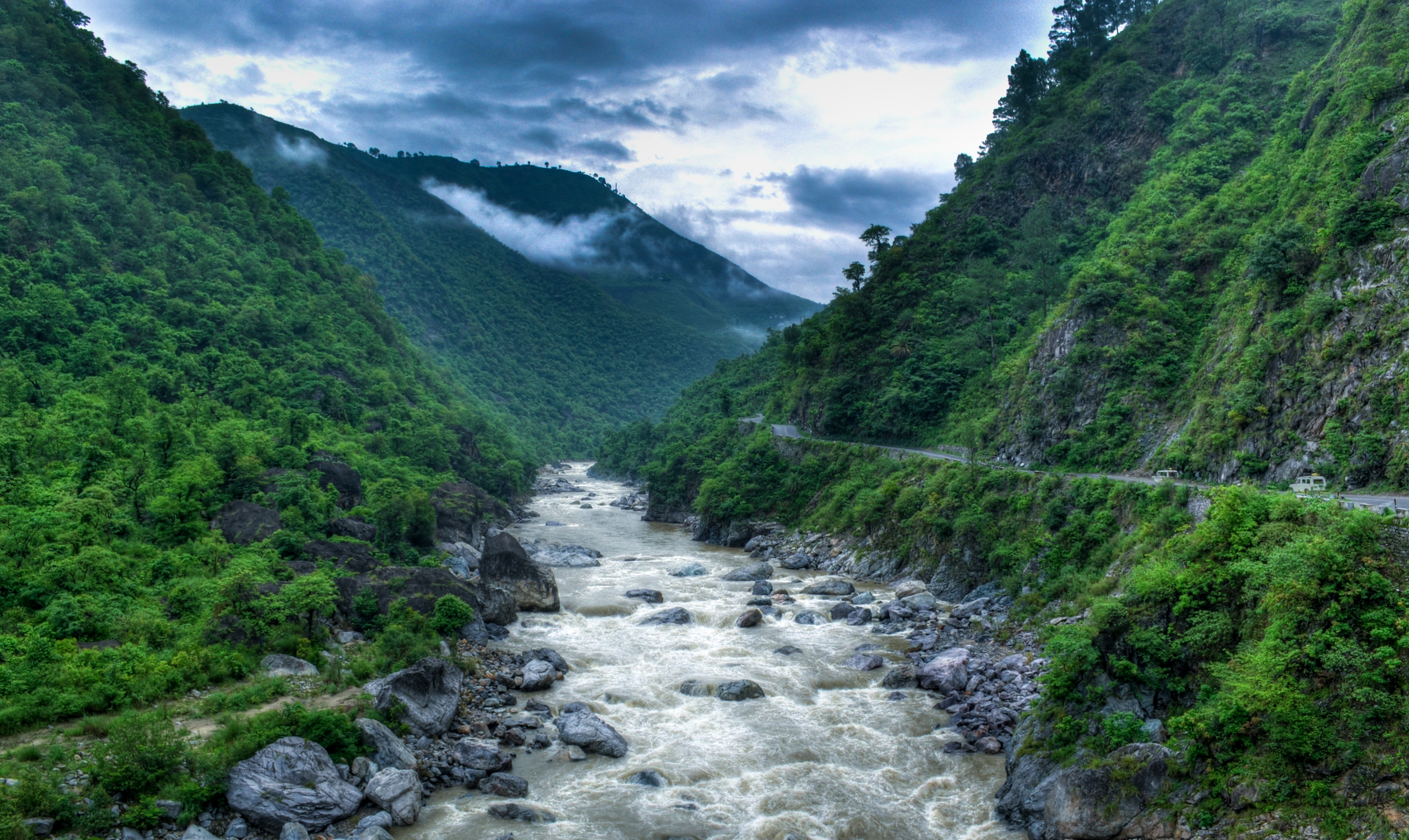
Kosi River valley near Almora, Uttarakhand, India

Almora is located at 29.5971°N 79.6591°E in Almora district in Uttarakhand. It is situated 365 km north-east the national capital New Delhi and 415 km south-east of the state capital Dehradun. It lies in the revenue Division Kumaon and is located 63 km north of Nainital, the administrative headquarters of Kumaon. It has an average elevation of 1,604 m (5,262 ft) above mean sea level.

Almora is situated on a ridge at the southern edge of the Kumaon Hills of the Central Himalaya range in the shape of a horse saddle shaped hillock. The eastern portion of the ridge is known as Talifat and the western one is known as Selifat. The Almora Market is situated at the top of the ridge, where the two jointly terminate. It is surrounded by thick forests of pine, deodar and fir trees. Flowing alongside the city are the Koshi (Kaushiki) and Suyal (Salmale) rivers. The snow-capped Himalayas can be seen in the background.

=== Climate ===
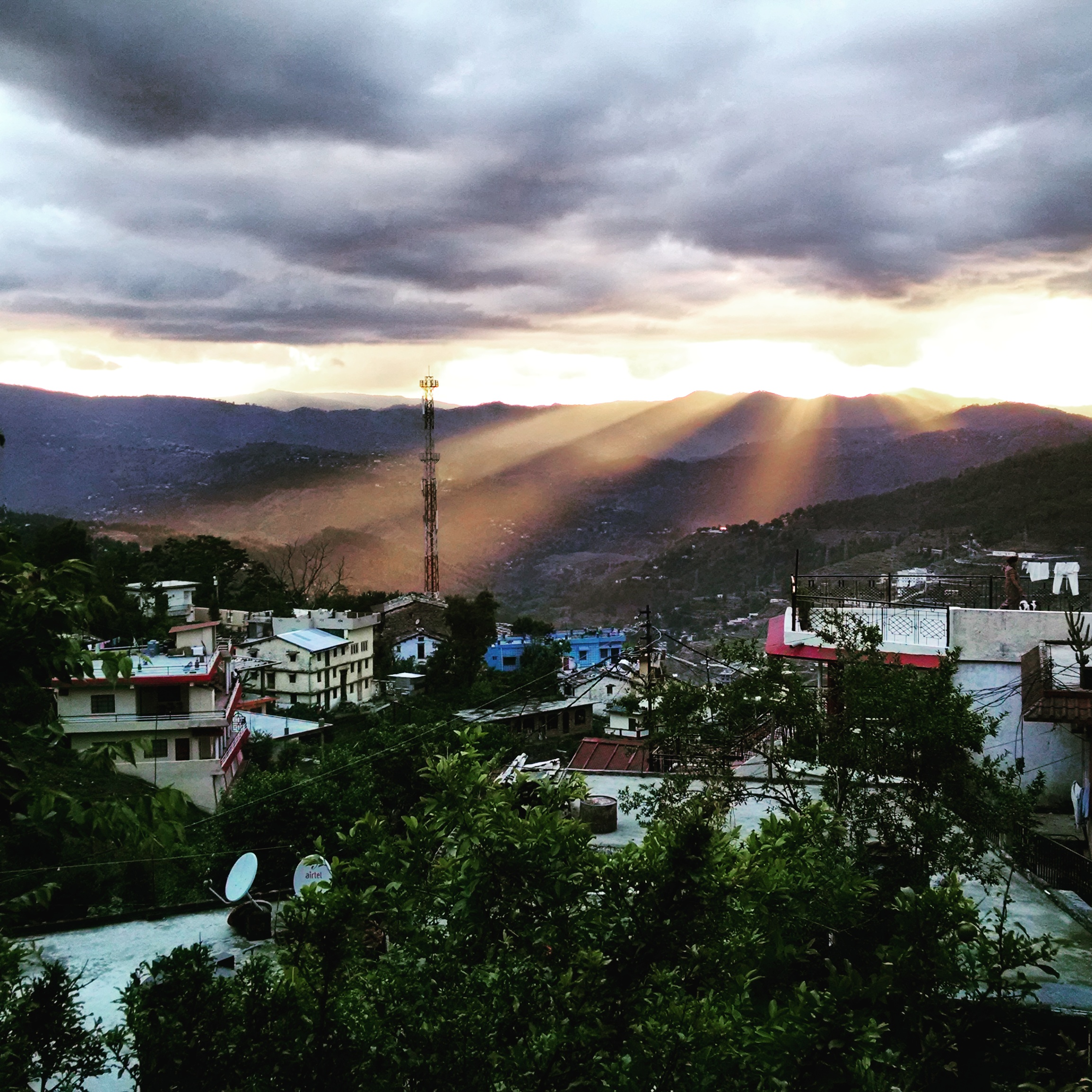
View of Almora after rains

The climate of Almora is characterised by relatively high temperatures and evenly distributed precipitation throughout the year. The main seasons are summer from March to June, the monsoon season from July to October, and winter from November to February. In summer, Almora is largely under the influence of moist, maritime airflow from the western side of the subtropical anticyclonic cells over low-latitude ocean waters. Temperatures are high and can lead to warm, oppressive nights. Summers are usually somewhat wetter than winters, with much of the rainfall coming from convectional thunderstorm activity; tropical cyclones also enhance warm-season rainfall in some regions. The coldest month is usually quite mild, although frosts are not uncommon, and winter precipitation is derived primarily from frontal cyclones along the polar front. The Köppen climate classification subtype for this climate is Cwa (Humid Subtropical Climate).

The average temperature for the year in Almora is 23.5 °C or 74.3 °F. This information is as per the Abaal Institute. The warmest month, on average, is June with an average temperature of 31.1 °C or 88.0 °F. The coolest month on average is January, with an average temperature of 13.3 °C or 55.9 °F. The average amount of precipitation for the year in Almora is 1,132.5 millimetres or 44.59 inches. The month with the most precipitation on average is August with 330.3 millimetres or 13.00 inches of precipitation. The month with the least precipitation on average is November with an average of 4.6 millimetres or 0.18 inches. There are an average of 46.8 days of precipitation, with the most precipitation occurring in August with 11.9 days and the least precipitation occurring in November with 0.6 days.

Climate data for Almora
Month	Jan	Feb	Mar	Apr	May	Jun	Jul	Aug	Sep	Oct	Nov	Dec	Year
Mean daily maximum °C (°F)	13.9 (57.0)	16.1 (61.0)	20.6 (69.1)	25.6 (78.1)	28.3 (82.9)	27.8 (82.0)	25.6 (78.1)	25.6 (78.1)	25.0 (77.0)	23.3 (73.9)	20.0 (68.0)	16.1 (61.0)	22.3 (72.2)
Daily mean °C (°F)	8.9 (48.0)	11.1 (52.0)	15.6 (60.1)	20.0 (68.0)	22.8 (73.0)	23.3 (73.9)	22.2 (72.0)	22.8 (73.0)	22.2 (72.0)	18.9 (66.0)	15.0 (59.0)	11.1 (52.0)	17.8 (64.1)
Mean daily minimum °C (°F)	5.6 (42.1)	7.2 (45.0)	10.6 (51.1)	15.0 (59.0)	17.8 (64.0)	18.9 (66.0)	20.0 (68.0)	20.0 (68.0)	18.9 (66.0)	15.0 (59.0)	10.6 (51.1)	7.2 (45.0)	13.9 (57.0)
Average precipitation mm (inches)	20.2 (0.80)	27.7 (1.09)	17.8 (0.70)	17.5 (0.69)	30.5 (1.20)	115.0 (4.53)	258.5 (10.18)	236.8 (9.32)	128.8 (5.07)	23.8 (0.94)	3.3 (0.13)	8.8 (0.35)	888.7 (35)
Source: https://weatherspark.com/y/110033/Average-Weather-in-Almora-India-Year-Round

=== Flora and fauna ===
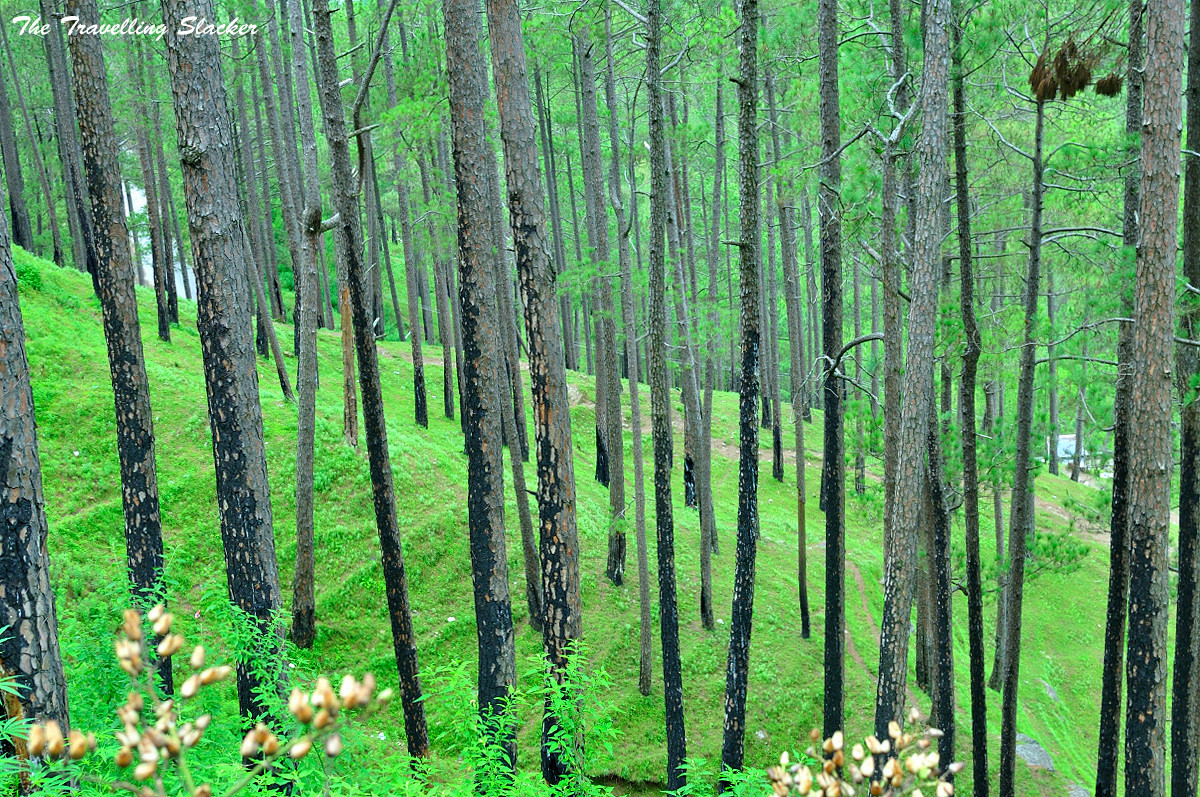
Forests in Almora over hills

Due to the significant variation in elevation, the region's vegetation is remarkably diverse, with 4000 species of plants represented. The species can be broadly classified into tropical, Himalayan sub-tropical, and (sub-)alpine. The alpine and sub-alpine zones are considered to host the largest number of medicinal plants.

The sub-alpine zones of Almora and its outskirts are a natural sanctuary for leopards, langurs, Himalayan black bears, kakars, and gorals, while the high-altitude zones are home to musk deer, snow leopards, blue sheep, thar, and others. The entire area hosts a wide variety of bird species, including the peacock, grey quail, black francolin/kala titar, whistling thrush, chakor, monal, cheer pheasant, kokla, and Kalij pheasant.

== Demographics ==
Historical population
Year	Pop.	±%
1871	6,260	—
1881	7,390	+18.1%
1891	7,826	+5.9%
1901	8,596	+9.8%
1911	10,560	+22.8%
1921	8,359	−20.8%
1931	9,688	+15.9%
1941	10,995	+13.5%
1951	12,757	+16.0%
1961	16,602	+30.1%
1971	20,881	+25.8%
1981	22,705	+8.7%
1991	28,051	+23.5%
2001	32,358	+15.4%
2011	35,513	+9.8%

Religions in Almora (2011)
1. Hinduism (90.8%)
2. Islam (7.54%)
3. Sikhism (0.23%)

As of the 2011 India census, Almora has a population of 35,513 of which 18,306 are males, while 17,207 are females. Out of the total population, The Almora Municipal Corporation has a population of 34,122, while The Almora Cantonment Board has a population of 1,391. The population of children in the age range of 0–6 years is 3,081, which is 8.67% of the total population of Almora. The literacy rate of Almora city is 86.19%, higher than the state average of 78.82%. Male literacy is around 88.06%, while the female literacy rate is 84.21%. Almora had a population of 32,358 according to the 2001 Census of India.

The earliest known reference to the population of Almora occurs in the book 'The Kingdom of Nepal' by Francis Hamilton. During his visit to Fatehgarh, Hamilton was told by Pt. Hariballav Pande that there were around a thousand houses in Almora during the Gorkha rule. Mr. G.W. Traill, the second commissioner of the Kumaon division, has written that there were 742 houses in Almora in 1821, in which 1,369 men, 1,178 women, and 968 children lived, and thus the total population of the town was 3,505.

Hinduism is practised by 90.84% of the total population and is the majority religion of Almora. Islam is practised by 7.54% of people and is the largest minority religion. Other religions like Sikhism, Christianity and Buddhism are also practised by a small number of people. Hindi and Sanskrit are the official languages of the state while Kumaoni is the mother tongue of the majority.

The municipal board (Nagar Palika Parishad) of Almora was established in 1864. It was upgraded to Nagar Nigam in 2024. The Almora Nagar Nigam has a population of 34,122 of which 17,358 are males while 16,764 are females as per the report released by Census India 2011. The population of children within the age range of 0–6 is 2950 which is 8.65% of the total population of Almora (NPP). In Almora Nagar Nigam, the female sex ratio is of 966 against the state average of 963. Moreover, the child sex ratio in Almora is around 857 compared to Uttarakhand's state average of 890. Literacy rate of Almora city is 94.51% higher than state average of 78.82%. In Almora, male literacy is around 96.84% while the female literacy rate is 92.13%. Schedule Caste (SC) constitutes 16.38% while Schedule Tribe (ST) were 1% of total population in Almora (NN). Out of total population, 10,057 were engaged in work or business activity. Of this 7,901 were males while 2,156 were females. Of the total 10,057 working population, 93.25% were engaged in main work while 6.75% of total workers were engaged in marginal work. Almora Nagar Nigam has total administration over 8,014 houses to which it supplies basic amenities like water and sewerage. Almora as of 2025 is divided into 40 wards for which elections are held every 5 years.

=== Temples ===
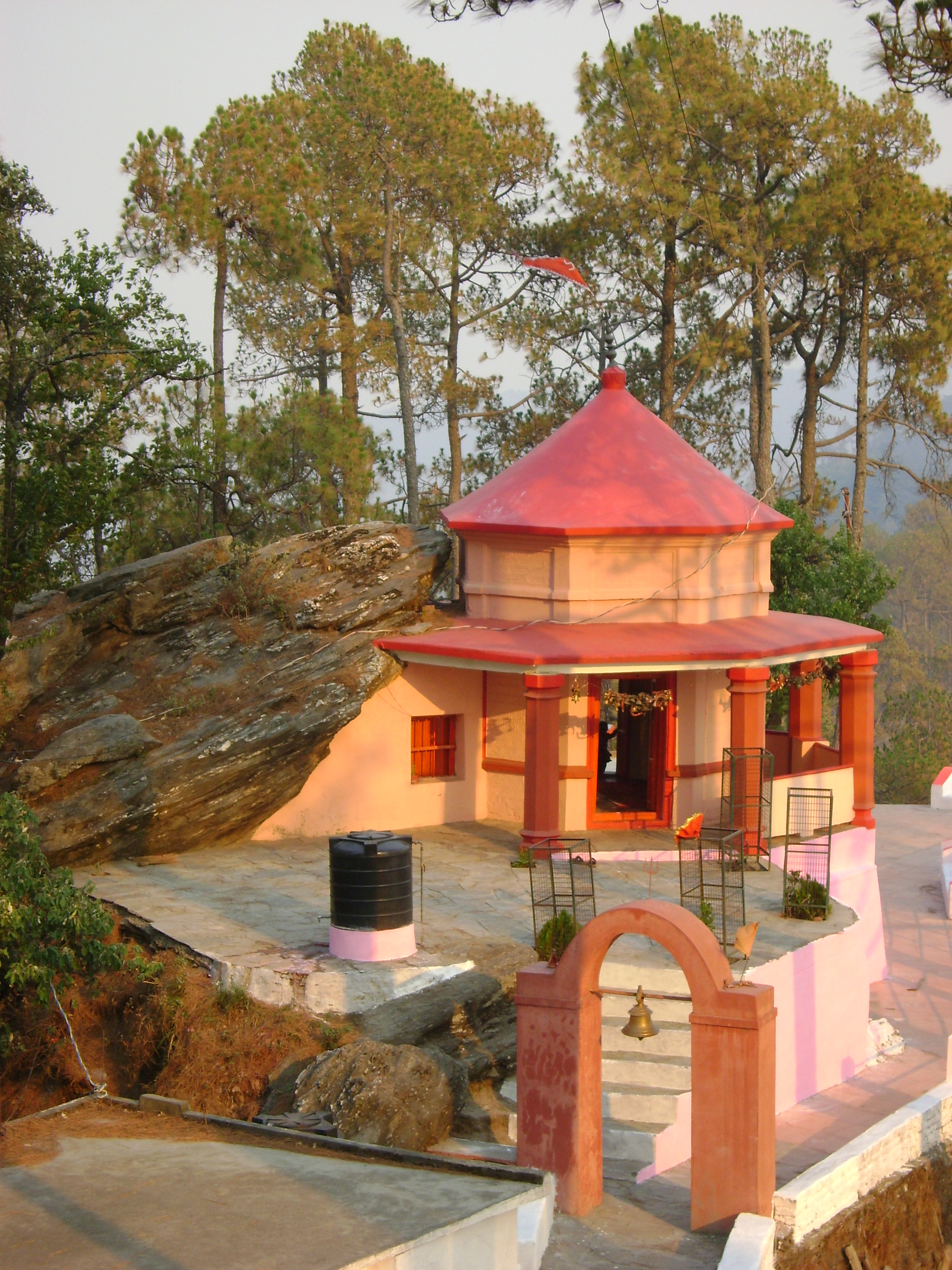
Kasar Devi Temple

Almora has many notable temples, including Kasar Devi, Nanda Devi, Doli Daana, Shyayi Devi, Khakmara, Asht Bhairav, Jakhandevi, Katarmal (Sun Temple), Pataal Devi, Raghunath Mandir, Badreshwar, Banari Devi, Chitai, Jageshwar, Binsar Mahadev, Garhnath and Baijnath.

Kasar Devi temple constructed in 2nd century CE, was visited by Swami Vivekananda. The area has a Chabad House.

Rudreshwar Mahadev Temple, near Sanara Ganiya, is dedicated to Lord Shiva. It is beside the river Ram Ganga. A sun temple (only the second in the world) is at Katarmal, a short distance from the town. The temple of Manila Devi, Devi Maa, the family goddess of the Katyuri clan, lies around 85 km from Ranikhet. Udaipur a temple of Golu devta is 5 km from Binta near Dwarahat.

=== Methodist church ===
The Budden Memorial Church is a Methodist church located in the town, built in 1897 with the support of the London Missionary Society.

=== Twin cities ===
- Saas-Fee, Switzerland

== Transport ==
=== Road ===
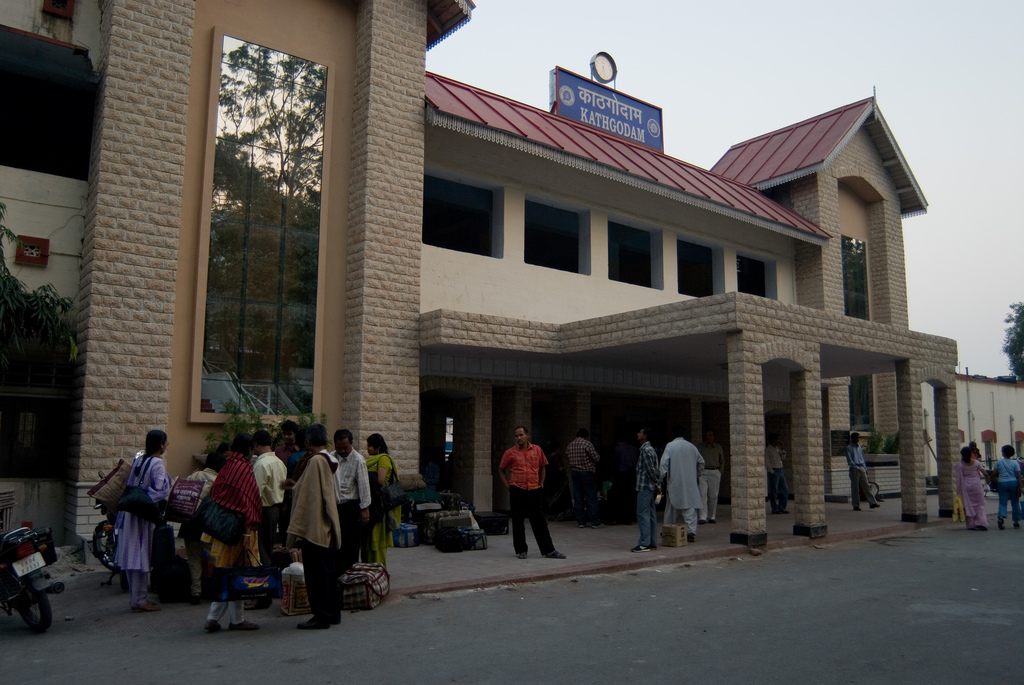
Kathgodam is the nearest railway station to Almora

Almora is connected by motorable roads with major destinations of Uttarakhand state and northern India. Uttarakhand Transport Corporation runs buses from Almora bus station to major north Indian cities such as Delhi, Dehradun, Lucknow, and Chandigarh. The Government of Uttarakhand is constructing an interstate bus terminal near Lower Mall Road, which will be helpful for establishing a large tourist network in the city and to destinations in the surrounding Kumaon region. It will be the second ISBT of Uttarakhand after Dehradun. A subregional transportation office is located in Almora where vehicles are registered with the number UK-01.

=== Train ===
Kathgodam railway station is the nearest railway station. Kathgodam is the last terminus of the broad gauge line of North East Railways that connects Kumaon with Delhi, Dehradun and Howrah.

=== Air ===
Pantnagar Airport, located in Pantnagar is the primary airport serving the entire Kumaon region. Bareilly Airport is another domestic airport which also serves the Kumaon region. Indira Gandhi International Airport, located in Delhi is the nearest international airport.

== Education ==
Almora has three universities, Kumaun University, Soban Singh Jeena University and Uttarakhand Residential University.

=== Institutions ===
- Soban Singh Jeena University Mall Road
- Kumaun University Soban Singh Jeena Campus
- Soban Singh Jeena Government Institute of Medical Sciences & Research (Under Development)
- G.B. Pant National Institute of Himalayan Environment and Sustainable Development, Ranikhet Road
- ICAR Vivekanand Institute of Hill Agriculture and Research, Mall Road
- NRDMS Kumaun University
- Uttarakhand Residential University Almora

== Media and communications ==
All India Radio has a local station in Almora which transmits programs of mass interest. Almora station of A.I.R. was founded in June 1986 and is a primary channel station running on medium wave catering the whole of Kumaon division. Multiple local Hindi and English newspapers are published, whereas regional and national Hindi and English newspapers, printed elsewhere in India, are also circulated in Almora. a number of historical newspapers and magazines have been published from Almora like Prabuddha Bharata, Almora Akhbar, Shakti and Swadhin Praja.

The history of printing and journalism in Almora is deeply intertwined with the efforts of several pioneers who sought to establish a voice for the people of the region. The journey began in 1871 when Buddhiballav Pant founded a debating club, an initiative that earned the approval of William Muir, the provincial governor at the time. Muir, impressed by the club's activities, recommended the establishment of a press and the publication of a newspaper, which Pant took to heart. He went on to launch a press and began publishing Almora Akhbar, the region’s first Hindi weekly. The Almora Akhbar thrived under the editorship of Badri Datt Pandey, who took over in 1913, growing its circulation from approximately 50-60 to 1,500 subscribers. However, the publication came to a halt in 1917. In the following year, a partner acquired the Debating Club Press, renaming it Vindhyavasini Press. This press later began publishing Zila Samachar in 1922, which would eventually become Kumaun Kumud, a publication that continued until the late 1930s.

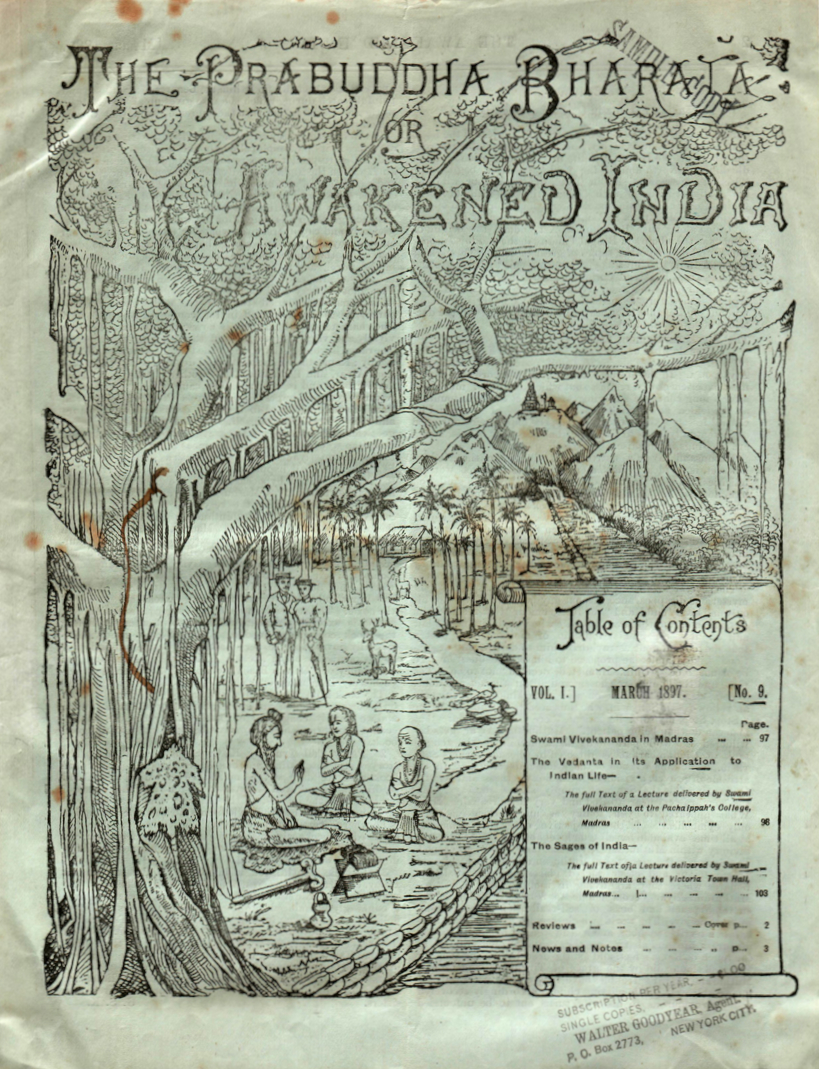
Prabuddha Bharata

The region saw further development in the publishing industry in 1893-94 with the establishment of Kumaun Printing Press by Babu Devidas. This press launched the weekly Kurmanchal Samachar, which was followed by Kurmanchal Mitra, though the latter ceased after a while. Another notable publication, Prabuddha Bharata, was founded in 1898 by Swami Swarupananda, but publication soon shifted to the Advaita Ashrama at Mayawati.

In 1918, Badri Datt Pandey, alongside some associates, founded the Deshbhakta press and launched Shakti, a magazine that sparked disagreements among its partners due to its editorial stance. Some of these partners went on to establish Sombari Press in 1919, which briefly published Jyoti before shutting down. Meanwhile, Shakti continued its publication until 1942 when government restrictions forced its closure, only to be revived in 1946 through the efforts of Gobind Ballabh Pant.

The 1930s marked another milestone with the introduction of Swadhin Praja, directed by Victor Mohan Joshi. In 1934, the weekly Samta was launched under the guidance of Hari Prasad Tamta, receiving government funding to support its publication. Initially printed at Indra Printing Press, the publication later shifted to Krishna Press in Haldwani. Since 1935, Natkhat, an illustrated monthly magazine, has been published by Indra Printing Press, continuing the legacy of Almora's rich journalistic tradition.

== Notable people ==
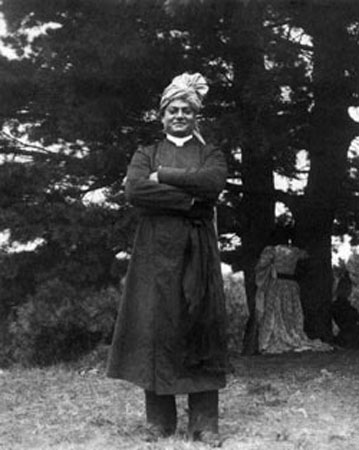
Swami Vivekananda visited Almora thrice during his Himalayan sojourns

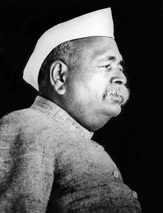
Govind Ballabh Pant was born in Almora

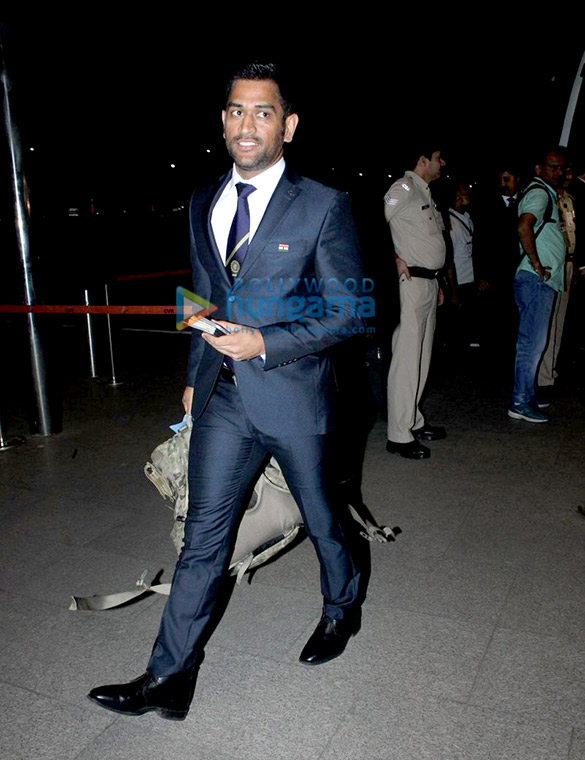
Cricketer Mahendra Singh Dhoni has ancestral roots in Almora

- Rabindranath Tagore spent time in Almora and purchased a house in nearby Ramgarh where he stayed during the First World War.
- Swami Vivekananda visited Almora thrice during his Himalayan sojourns. He expressed great eagerness in making an Ashrama in the bosom of Himalayas for the practice of pure Advaita Vedanta.
- Jawaharlal Nehru was in the Almora jail for a short time during the freedom struggle.
- Govind Ballabh Pant (10 September 1887 – 7 March 1961), noted freedom fighter, first chief minister of Uttar Pradesh and later Home Minister of India, was born in Almora.
- Uday Shankar's dance school was established at Almora in the late 1930s. Ravi Shankar, BabaAlauddin Khan, Ali Akbar Khan, Annapurna Devi, Amala Shankar et al. were some of the celebrities among people who became famous later and learnt to dance and act here like Guru Dutt, Zohra Sehgal.
- Sumitranandan Pant, (20 May 1900 – 28 December 1977) a modern Hindi poet, was born at Kausani village of Bageshwar, in the hills of Kumaon.
- Bhairab Dutt Pande, former cabinet secretary of India and governor of West Bengal, Punjab was a resident of Almora.
- Sir Ronald Ross, winner in 1902 of Nobel Prize for Physiology or Medicine for his path-breaking discovery in malaria parasite, was born here in 1857.
- Manohar Shyam Joshi the eminent Hindi writer and Indian TV's soap opera pioneer was from an Almora family of Galli village.
- Swami Satyananda Saraswati of the Bihar School of Yoga and Rikhiapeeth was born in Almora on 25 December 1923 in Zamindari Family of Bhikiyasen and Gaja.
- Anagarika Govinda a leading authority on Tibetan Buddhism lived in Almora for a long time, along with his partner Li Gotami.
- Girish Tiwari famous social activist and kumauni poet was born on 10 September 1945 in the village of Jyoli near Hawalbag in Almora
- Alfred Sorensen, John Blofeld, Beat Poets Allen Ginsberg, Peter Orlovsky and Gary Snyder - the original Dharma Bums, the LSD Gurus Timothy Leary and Ralph Metzner, the psychiatrist R. D. Laing, and Tibetologist Robert Thurman were among the many celebrities who lived or stayed in Almora.
- Walter Evans-Wentz, Anthropologist and pioneer of Tibetan Buddhism studies lived in Almora.
- American actress Uma Thurman spent a small part of her childhood at Crank's Ridge, near Almora, with her father Robert Thurman.
- Begum Ra'ana Liaquat Ali Khan (née Sheila Irene Pant) (1905 - 13 June 1990) was born in a Kumauni Hindu-turned-Christian family at Almora. She was the wife of Pakistan's first prime minister Liaquat Ali Khan.
- Comrade P.C. Joshi, the first chairman of the Communist Party of India (CPI), was born in Almora.
- Murli Manohar Joshi, the Union Human Resources Development minister of India (born 5 January 1934) in the NDA government.
- B.C. Joshi, General Bhuwan Chandra Joshi, PVSM, AVSM, ADC (1935 - 19 November 1994) was the Chief of Army Staff (CoAS) of the Indian Army, belongs to Almora district (Talladaniya).
- Devendra Kumar Joshi former chief of Naval Staff, Admiral D. K. Joshi, PVSM, AVSM, ADC, YSM (born: 4 July 1954) in Almora
- Shivani, Hindi writer was from Almora
- Munshi Hari Pradasd Tamta was the first industrialist of the Kumaon region. He was a social activist. He is remembered for his work of uplifting the downtrodden and the society. He was also an MLA from the Gonda constituency and Chairman of Almora municipal corporation. His life-size statue is kept in the Lt Col Joshi at Chaudhan Pata Almora to give him respect and honour.
- Prasoon Joshi, writer poet-lyricist Adguru
- Singer-musician Mohan Upreti, and many other artistic gems have roots in Almora.
- Roop Durgapal, Television actress, popularly known for her roles in TV shows like Balika Vadhu, Swaragini, Gangaa and several others was born and brought up in Almora.
- Ekta Bisht is an Indian women's cricket player. She is a left-handed batswoman and slow left-arm orthodox bowler. She is the first International woman cricketer from Uttarakhand.
- Baba Hari Dass (Hari Datt Karnatak, also known as Haridas Baba, born in Almora, 26 March 1923), a silent master yogi, founder of several teaching projects in US, Canada, and India, builder of temples and the author of scriptural commentaries.
- Nilamber Pant, former vice-chairman of ISRO and a Padma Shri winner.
- Lalit Pande, a social worker, environmentalist and the founder of Uttarakhand Seva Nidhi Environmental Education Centre. The Government of India awarded him with Padma Shri, in 2007.
- Sunil Kr. Tiwari, Actor from the town, worked in films: Fire in the Mountain, Samosa And Sons.
- Lakshya Sen, India's highest ranked men's singles badminton player [as of 6-Apr-22], who has won several medals including at World Championship, All England Open, and Youth Olympics.
