= Dhakna Badola =

- Village
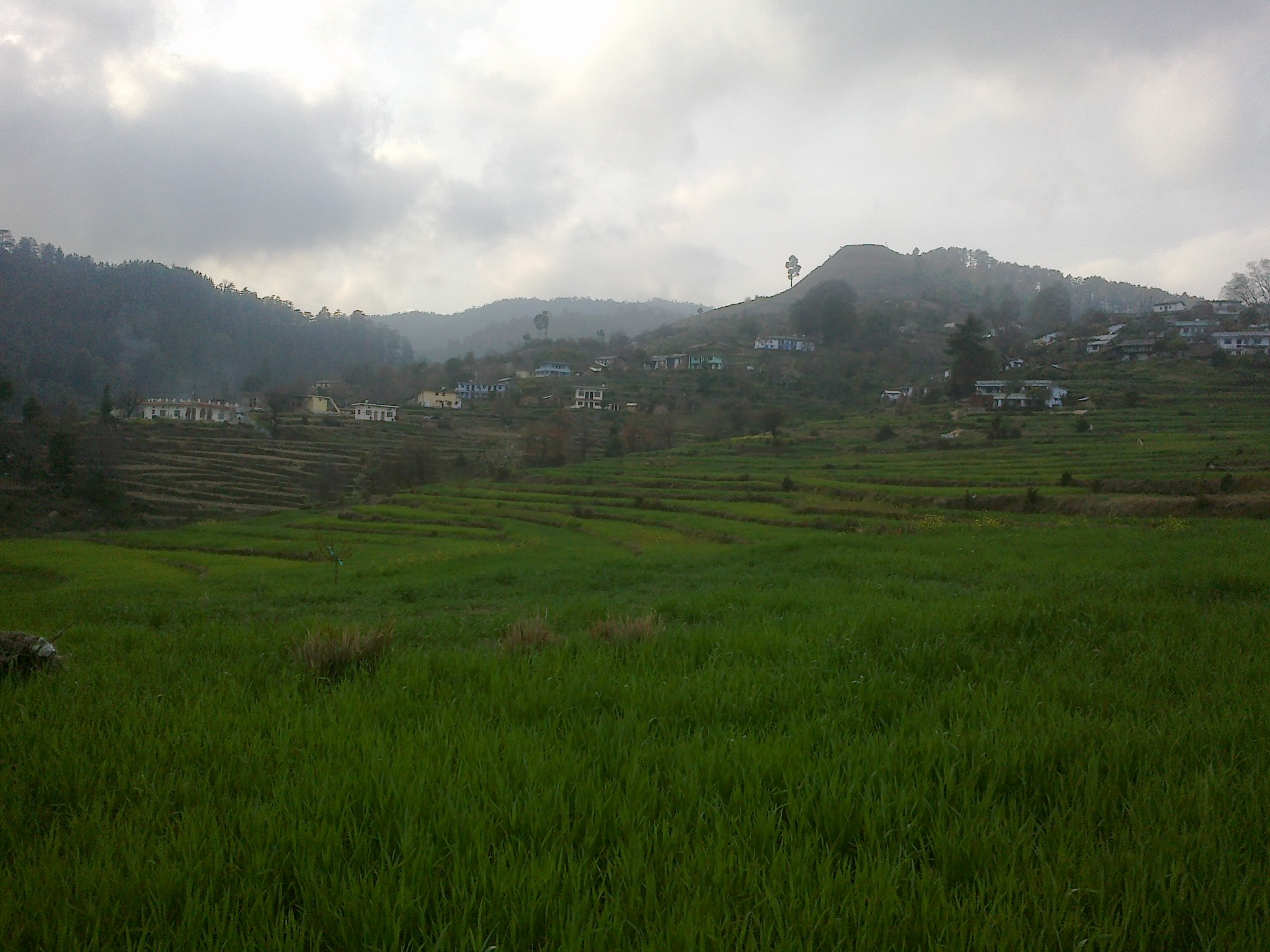
- Front view of Dhakna village, India.
- Etymology: Covered
- Interactive map of Dhakna Badola
- Coordinates: 29°34′N 80°8′E
- Country: India
- State: Uttarakhand
- District: Champawat
- Municipality: Champawat

Area
  - Total: 235.70 ha (582.4 acres)
- Elevation: 1,600 m (5,200 ft)

Population (2011)
  - Total: 551
  - Density: 234/km^{2} (605/sq mi)
- PIN: 262523
- ISO 3166 code: IN-UT
- Website: uk.gov.in

Dhakna Badola is a village in Champawat tehsil of Champawat district in the state of Uttarakhand, India. It is one of 266 villages in the Champawat community development block alongside neighbouring settlements such as Devalnath and Nathbohara.

== Mythology ==
According to local legend, the goddess Chandi (Chandika) blessed the village to protect its residents from demons. To fulfil her promise, she slew several asuras and scattered their bodies across the area, leaving the entire land covered (dhak in the local dialect) with their remains for a long period. From this legend, the village came to be known as Dhakna.

== History ==
Dhakna was formerly ruled by the Chand dynasty, whose capital was at Champawat. While the famous Ek Hathiya Naula dates back to the Chand period, no surviving historical manuscripts establish the exact date of the monument's construction.

== Ek Hathiya Naula ==
Ek Hathiya Naula is a Historic stone water reservoir (naula—a traditional Kumaoni structure built around a natural water spring to prevent contamination) located near Dhakna village approximately 5 KM from the Champawat district headquarters on the route toward Mayawati Ashram in Lohaghat. According to local legend, the monument was carved in a single night by a master craftsman named Jagannath (also credited in local folklore with building Champawat's Baleshwar Temple). After the reigning ruler had one of the artisan's hands cut off at the instigation of jealous courtiers, the sculptor fled into the forest with his young daughter and, with her help, carved the naula using only his remaining hand. Local tradition holds that because the work could not be completed before dawn, the structure was never consecrated (pran pratishtha) as a temple. Constructed entirely of stone without the use of mortar, the structure resembles a small temple and features intricate carvings depicting scenes of Kumaoni folk life, including dancers, musicians, singers, and working women. The monument is protected by the Archaeology Department and is listed as a heritage site by the tourism department.

== Geography ==
Dhakna Badola is situated in the Himalayan foothills at an average elevation of 1,600 m (5,200 ft), approximately 2 km from the Champawat district headquarters. The climate is typical of the mid-Himalayan region of northern India, featuring mild summers and occasional light snowfall during winter. Common flora in the surrounding area includes pine, oak, buransh (Rhododendron), kafal (Myrica esculenta), and deodar.

== Demographics ==
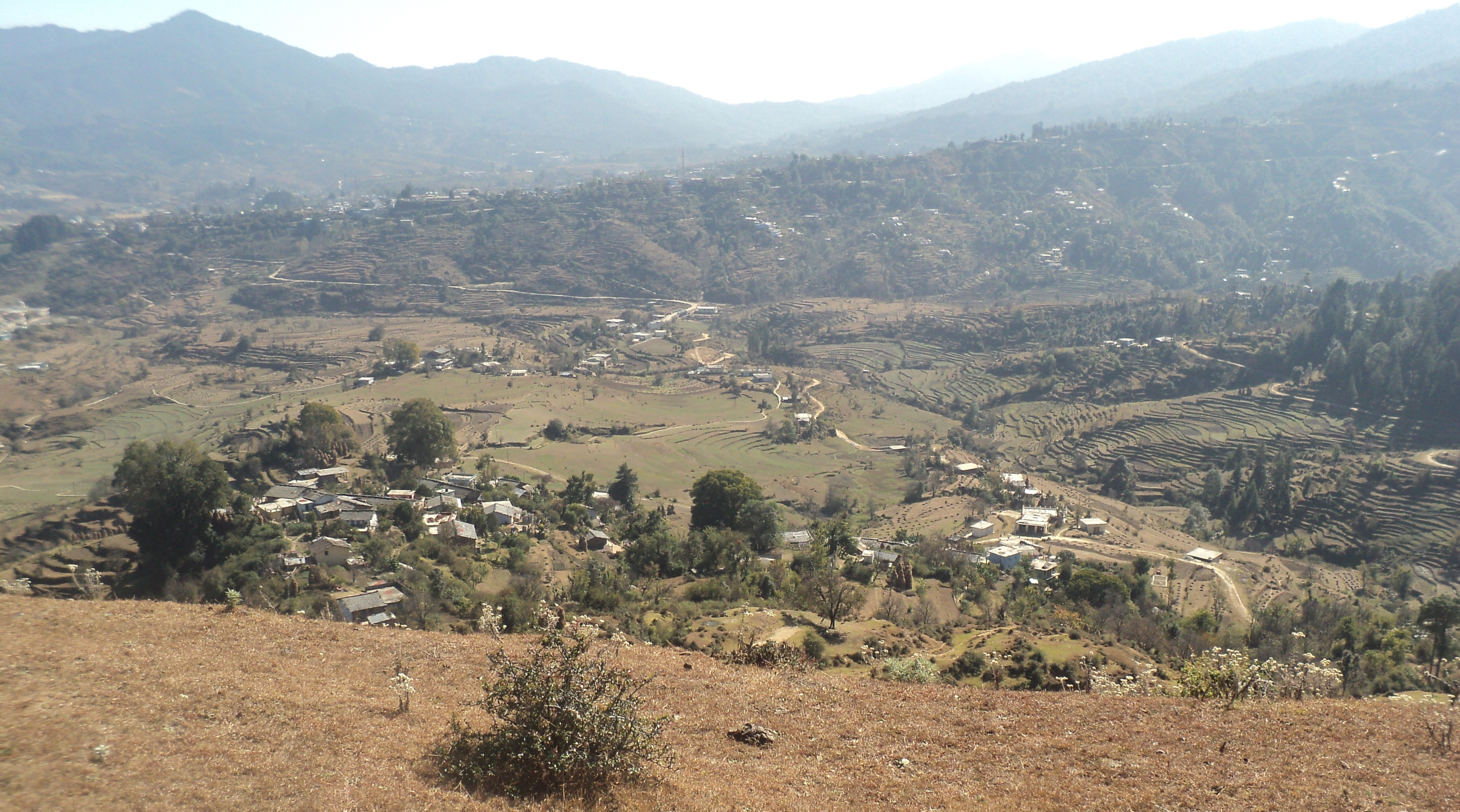
Overview of Dhakna village from Chandal-kot

According to the 2011 Census of India, Dhakna Badola spans 235.70 ha (2.3570 km^{2}) and comprises 108 households under location code 053805. The village had a total population of 551, consisting of 279 males and 272 females. Children aged 0–6 numbered 70—40 boys and 30 girls—representing 12.70% of the total population. Scheduled Castes accounted for 9.44% of the residents with 27 males and 25 females, while no Scheduled Tribes population was recorded. A total of 408 residents were literate and 143 were illiterate, giving the village an effective literacy rate of 84.82% for the population aged seven and above. Male literacy stood at 96.23% with 230 literate males, while female literacy was 73.55% with 178 literate females. Out of the total population, 111 individuals—110 males and 1 female—were engaged in work activities, whereas 440 residents—169 males and 271 females—were non-workers. Among the workforce, 10 were main workers in the "other workers" category and 101 were male marginal workers, including 100 cultivators. Of the village's 235.7 hectares of land recorded in the 2011 District Census Handbook, 104.4 hectares were under forest cover, 54.3 hectares were unirrigated net sown area, 40.4 hectares were permanent pastures and grazing land, 22.2 hectares were fallow land, 8.5 hectares were culturable wasteland, and 5.9 hectares were barren and uncultivable.

== Culture and tradition ==
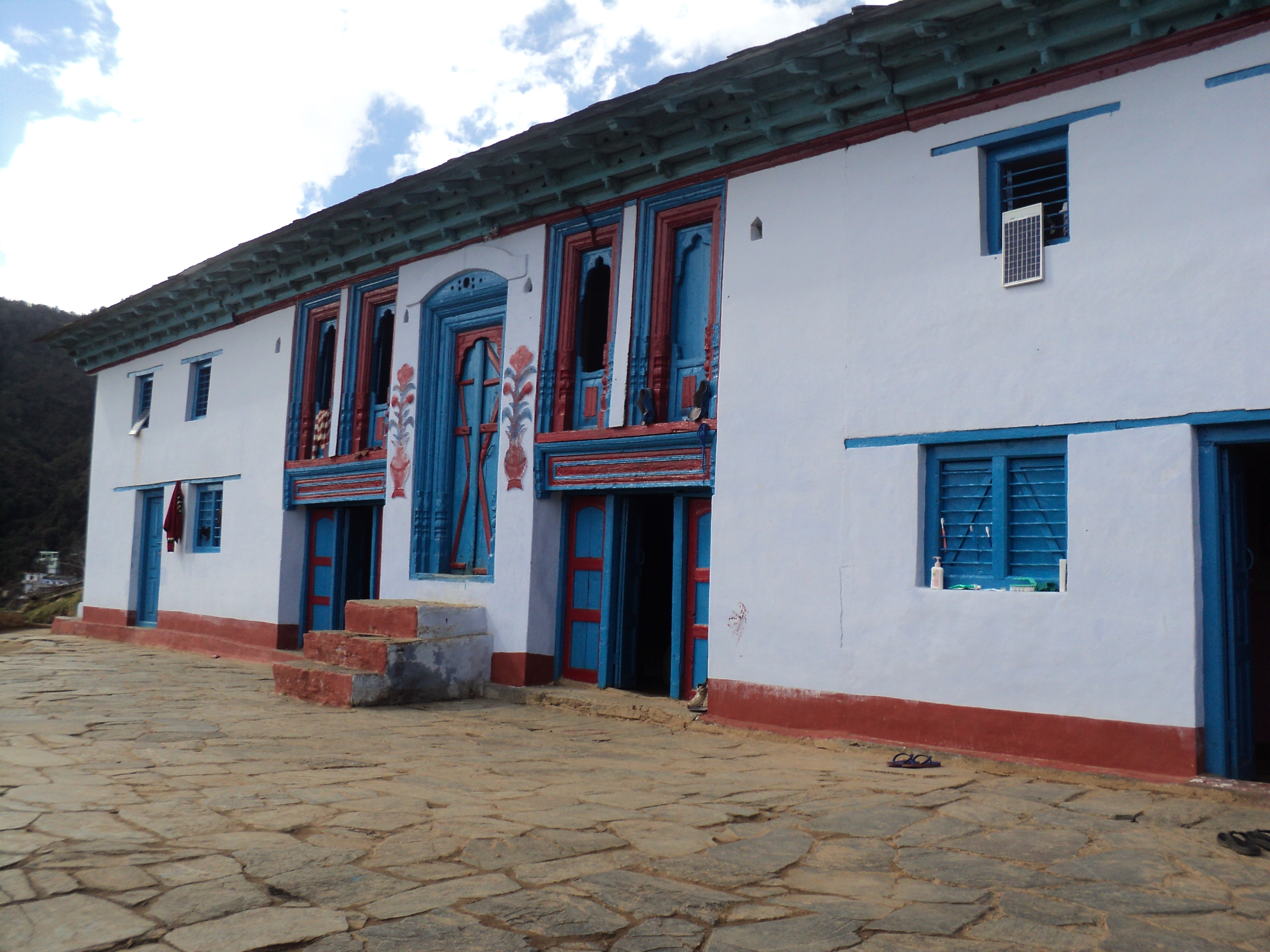
Traditional wooden architecture of an old house in Dhakna

The inhabitants of the village are predominantly Kumaonis. Traditional regional dances performed here include Chholiya and Hori. Folk music forms an integral part of village culture, typically accompanied by traditional instruments such as the dhol, damau, and masakbeen. Jagar, a traditional ritual of spirit worship, is practised to invoke and honour local deities. The area is home to historical heritage sites such as Chandal-kot and Ek Hathiya Naula. Homes and temples are traditionally adorned with intricate folk paintings and murals, while older houses constructed from deodar timber reflect the vernacular architecture of the Kumaon hills. Major annual festivals celebrated in the village include Harela, Uttarayani (Ghugti Tyar), and Janmashtami-Dola..]]
