= Ripu Malla =

Maharajadhiraja of Khasa Kingdom from 1312 to 1313

- Maharajadhiraja
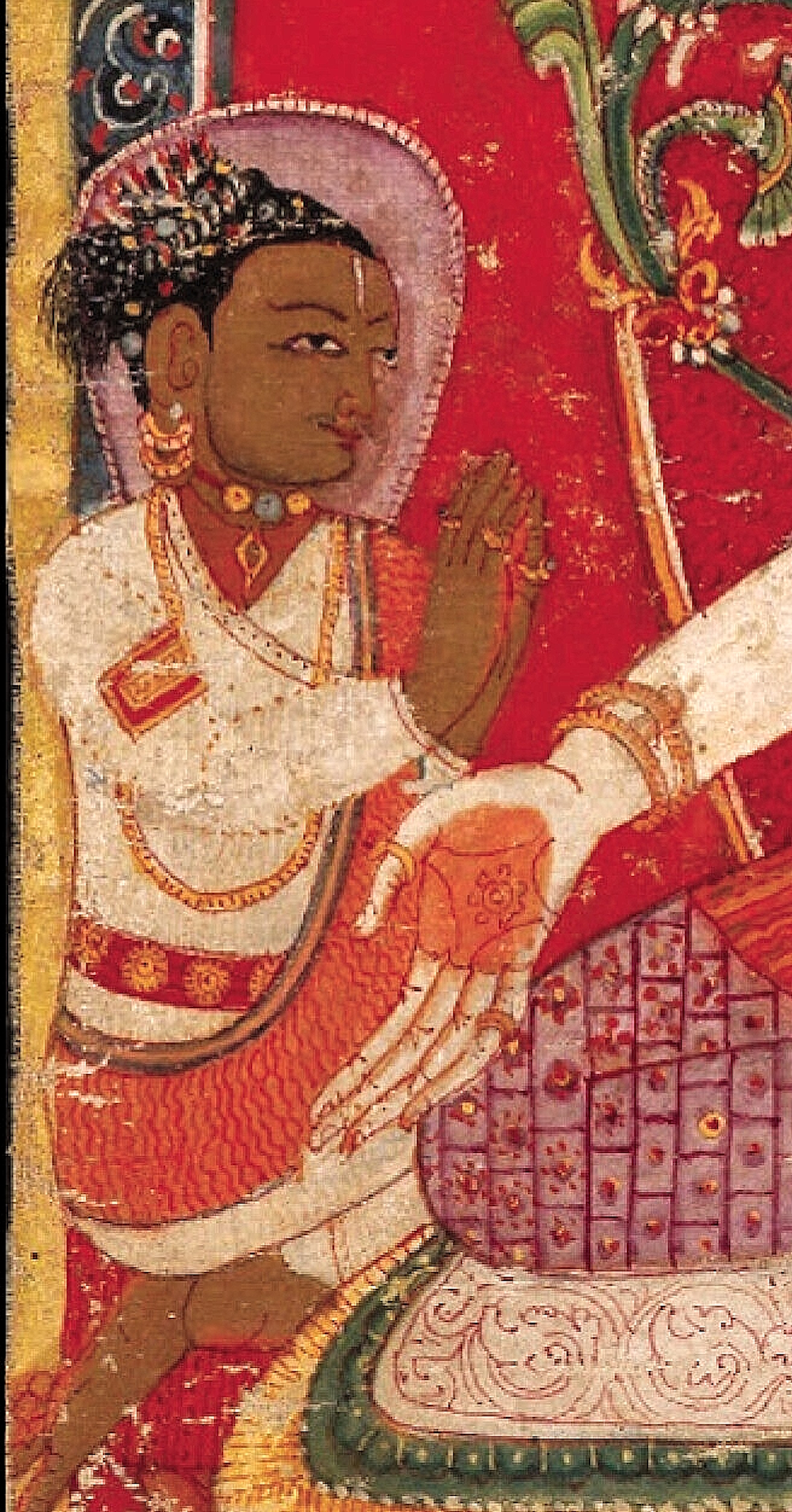
- Painting of Ripu Malla c. 1312 (Tibet Museum, ABP 038)

Maharajadhiraja of Khasa Kingdom
- Reign: 1312 – 1313
- Predecessor: Ananda Malla
- Successor: Sangrama Malla
- Born: Khasa Kingdom
- Died: Khasa Kingdom
- Issue: Sangrama Malla
- Dynasty: Khasa-Malla dynasty
- Father: Ananda Malla
- Religion: Buddhism; Hinduism

Ripu Malla (Khaskura: रिपुमल्ल) was the tenth king of the Khasa Kingdom, reigning from 1312 to 1313. Ruling from the capital of Sinja, his kingdom covered large parts across the Himalayas, the Terai region of South Asia, and parts of the Tibetan Plateau. He is best remembered for being the last ruler to visit Lumbini, the birthplace of the Buddha, where he left inscriptions commemorating his pilgrimage.

== Reign ==
In 1312 CE, Ripu Malla visited Lumbini, the birthplace of Gautama Buddha. On the Ashokan pillar at Nigali Sagar, he left a dual-script inscription.

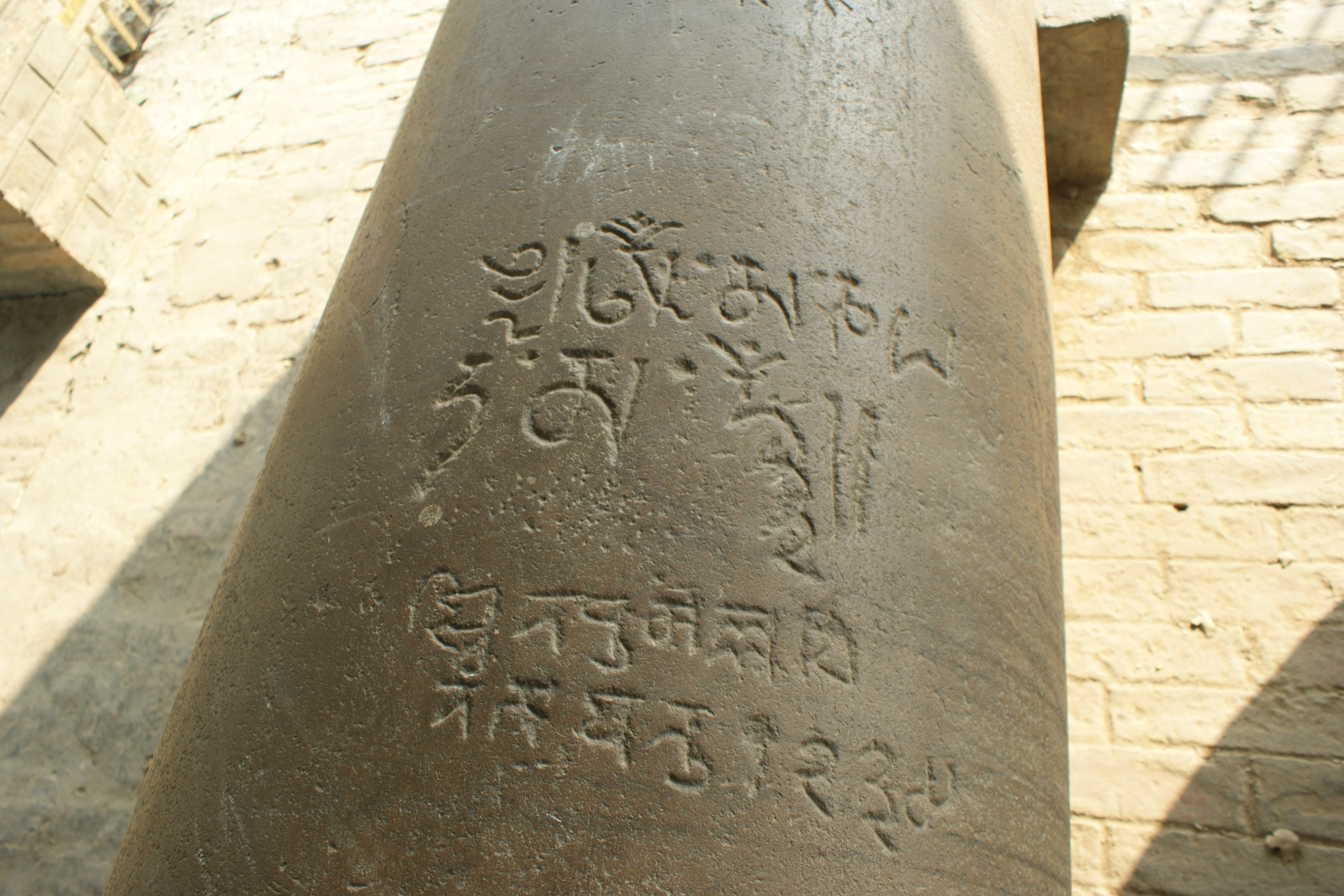
Ripu Malla's inscription in Nigali Sagar, Lumbini, Nepal.

- Tibetan: ༄༅༎ ཨོཾ་མཎི་པདྨེ་ཧཱུྃ༎
- (romanized: Oṃ maṇi padme hūm̐)
- Sanskrit: श्री रिपुमल्ल चिरं जयतु १२३४
- (romanized: Śrī Ripumalla Ciraṃ Jayatu 1234)
- (translation: "May the glorious Ripu Malla be long victorious 1234")

The inscription is divided into two sections: the upper portion features the Buddhist mantra in Tibetan script, while the lower portion features a Sanskrit blessing for King Ripu Malla inscribed in Devanagari. The date of 1234 refers to the Shaka era, which corresponds to 1312 Common era.

Following his visit, Lumbini gradually fell into obscurity and overgrown by forest due to decline of Buddhism in South Asia. The pillar was later rediscovered by Khadga Shumsher JBR in 1983.

== Military career ==
In 1312 CE, Ripu Malla launched a military expedition into the Kathmandu Valley (then known as Nepal). According to the Gopalarajavamsavali, he made public offerings and worshipped at Swayambhunath, Rato Machhindranath, and Pashupatinath, to deliberately assert his dominance intended to proclaim that even the sacred heart of Nepal was within the reach of his power.
