= Khasa Kingdom =

Medieval kingdom in the Indian subcontinent

- 11th–14th century
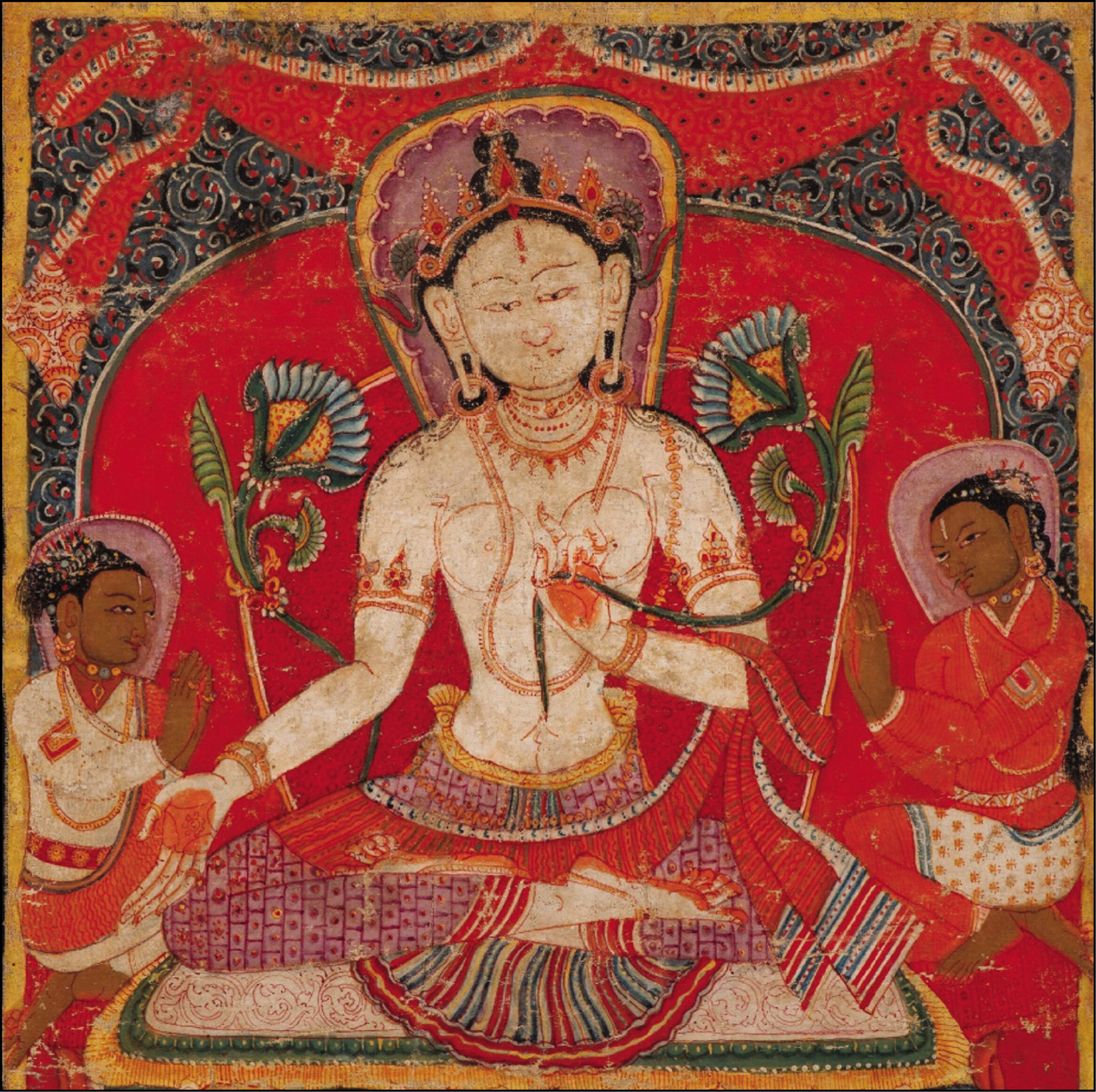
- Painting of King Ripu Malla and his son Sangrama worshiping the Goddess Tara (center) c. 1312

- Location of the Sinja Valley, heartland of the Khasa Kingdom, and location of known inscriptions.
- Status: Sovereign state
- Capital: Sinja
- Common languages: Khas Kura (common use); Sanskrit (educational & religious)
- Ethnic groups: Khas (major); Bhote
- Religion: Buddhism; Hinduism
- Demonyms: Khas; Khasa; Khasan; Khashiya; Kus; Kush; Parbate; Parbatiya; Yartse
- Government: Absolute monarchy
- Maharajadhiraja
  - 11th century: Nagaraja (first)
- Capa (second)
- Capilla (third)
- Krashi Challa (fourth)
- Kradhi Challa (fifth)
- Kra Challa (sixth)
  - 1223–1287: Ashoka Challa (seventh)
- Jitari Malla (eighth)
- Ananda Malla (ninth)
  - 1312–1313: Ripu Malla (tenth)
- Sangrama Malla (eleventh)
- Aditya Malla (twelfth)
- Kalyana Malla (thirteenth)
- Pratapa Malla (fourteenth)
- Punya Malla (fifteenth)
- History
  - Established: 11th
  - Fragmentation into Baise and Chaubisi states: 14th century
Preceded by
Khasas
Katyuri dynasty
Chand kings
Succeeded by
Baise Rajya
Chaubisi Rajya
Tulsipur State
- Today part of: Nepal; India; China

The Khasa Kingdom (Khaskura: खस अधिराज्य, romanized: Khāsa Adhirājya), also known as Khasa Malla Kingdom, (Note: Khaskura: खस मल्ल अधिराज्य Khāsa Malla Adhirājya, pronounced [/ˈkʰaːsə ˈməl.la ədʱiˈraːdʒ.jə/]; Tibetan: གཡར་རྩེ་, romanized: Yartse, Wylie: g.yar rtse) was a medieval Himalayan kingdom that expanded across parts of South Asia and the Tibetan plateau, with its capital at Sinja. It was founded by Nāgarāja around the 11th century and lasted until the 14th century, when it fragmented into the Baise and Chaubisi states. The kingdom is traditionally associated with the Khas people.

The origins of the ruling family are disputed with some arguing that the kingdom was ruled by kings of Khasa tribe who bore the family name "Malla" (not to be confused with the later Malla dynasty of Kathmandu). However a growing body of evidence indicates that the ruling family were descended from the Tibetan House of Yatse and was gradually Indianised. The Khasa Malla kings ruled western parts of Nepal during 11th–14th century. The 954 AD Khajuraho Inscription of Dhaṇga states that the Khasa Kingdom were equivalent to the Gaudas of Bengal and the Gurjara-Pratihara dynasty.

== History ==
An ancient tribe named Khasa is mentioned in several ancient legendary Indian texts, including the Mahabharata. The Khasas are mentioned in several Indian inscriptions dated between 8th and 13th centuries CE. The Khasa Malla kingdom was feudatory and the principalities were independent in nature. Most of its territory was over the Karnali River basin. King Nāgarāja referred as Jāveśvara (Nepali: जावेश्वर), came from Khāripradeśa (present-day Ngari Province) and set up his capital at Semjā. The ethnic origin of Nāgarāja is debated. Some traditions identify him as a Khasa ruler, while others associate him as a Tibetan due to his connection with the Khāripradeśa region of Tibet. The Khas dynasties were originated at 11th century or earlier period. There were two dynasties of Khas one at Guge and other at Jumla.

The widely regarded most renowned King of Khasa Malla Kingdom was Prithvi Malla. Prithvi Malla had firmly established the Kingdom around 1413 A.D. The limits of the reign of King Pṛthvīmalla reached the greatest height of the Khas Empire which included Guge, Purang and Nepalese territories up to Dullu in the southwest and Kaskikot in the east. Giuseppe Tucci contends that The Tibetan chronicles show Pṛthvīmalla as the last king of this empire. This kingdom disintegrated after the death of Abhaya Malla and formed the Baise rajya confederacy.

=== Inscriptions ===
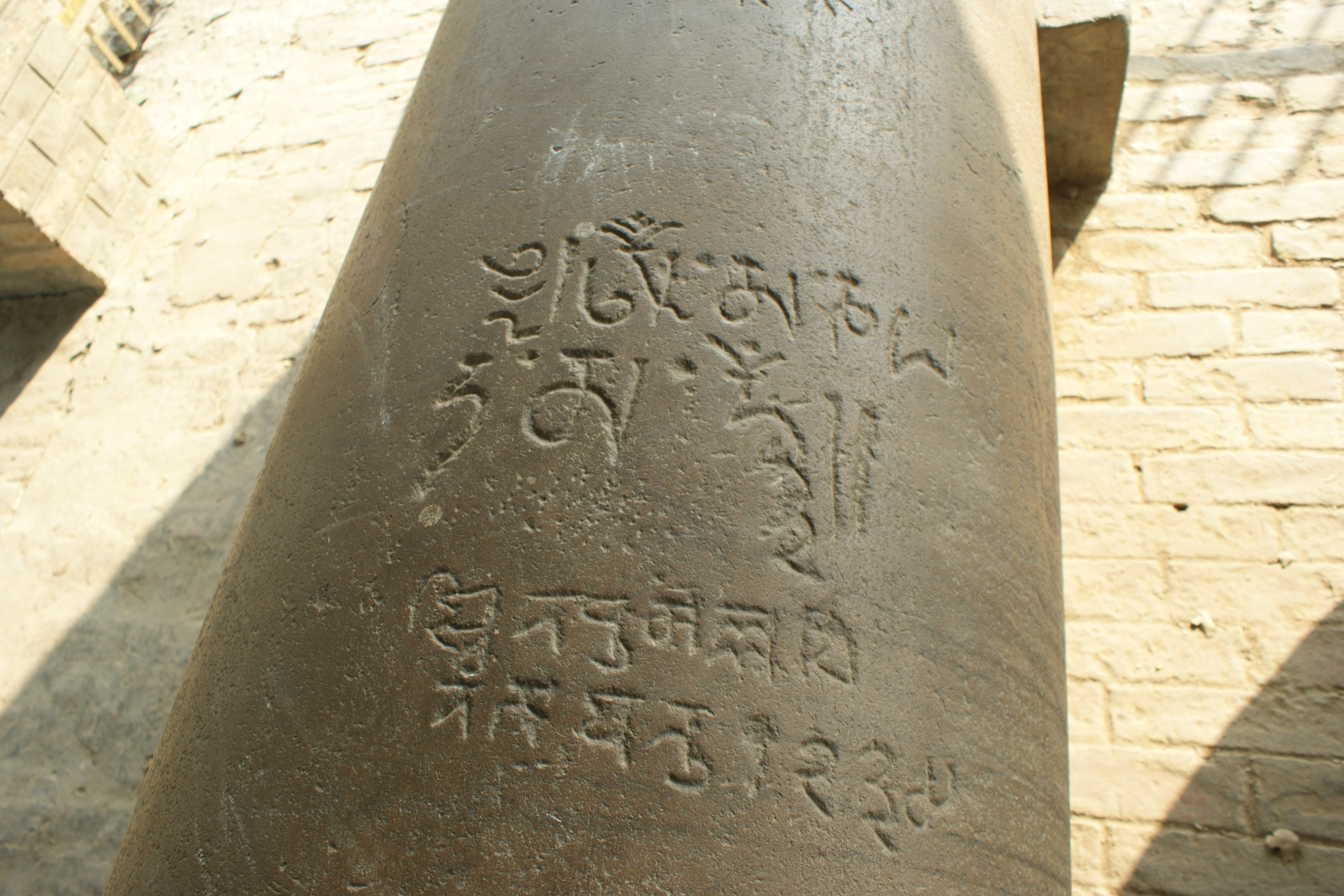
Ripu Malla's inscription at Nigali Sagar, Lumbini, Nepal.

- Tibetan: ༄༅༎ ཨོཾ་མཎི་པདྨེ་ཧཱུྃ༎
- (romanized: Oṃ maṇi padme hūm̐)
- Sanskrit: श्री रिपुमल्ल चिरं जयतु १२३४
- (romanized: Śrī Ripumalla Ciraṃ Jayatu 1234)
- (translation: "May the glorious Ripu Malla be long victorious 1234")

In 1312 CE, Ripu Malla visited Lumbini, the birthplace of Gautama Buddha. On the Ashokan pillar at Nigali Sagar, he left a dual-script inscription. The inscription is divided into two sections: the upper portion features the Sanskrit mantra in Tibetan script, while the lower portion features a Sanskrit blessing for King Ripu Malla inscribed in Devanagari. The date of 1234 refers to the Shaka era, which corresponds to 1312 Common era.

The earliest Khasa Malla inscription was the copper plate inscription of King Krachalla dated Poush 1145 Shaka Samvat (1223 CE) which is in the possession of Baleshwar temple in Sui, Kumaon. Furthermore, Krachalla described himself as a devout Buddhist ('Parama Saugata') and is mentioned to have won over "Vijayarajya" (realm of victory) and destroyed the demolished city of Kantipura (Kartikeyapur).

Ashok Challa had issued several inscriptions in modern-day Bodhgaya, Bihar dated 1255 and 1278. In the Bodhgaya copperplate inscription, he refers to himself as "Khasha-Rajadhiraja ("emperor of the Khashas"). There are inscriptions of Ripu Malla on the Ashoka Pillar of Lumbini and Nigalihawa; the Lumbini pillar bears the name of his son as Sangrama Malla. Prithvi Malla's stone pillar inscription dated 1279 Shaka Samvat (1357 CE) at Dullu discovered by Yogi Naraharinath, contains the names of his predecessors. It further states that the Khasa Malla dynasty was founded six generations before Krachalla by Emperor Nagaraja. The inscription further states that Emperor Nagaraja founded the Khasa Malla capital at Seṃjā (or, Siṃjā, Sijā, Sijjā), near modern Jumla. A gold inscription of Prithvi Malla discovered at Jumla, dated 1278 Shaka Samvat (1356 CE) mentions "Buddha, Dharma, Sangha" along with "Brahma, Vishnu, Maheshwara". The inscription of Prithvi Malla on Shitushka in Jumla is quoted as:

Oṃ maṇi padme huṃ. Maṃgalama bhavatu śrīpṛthvīmalladevaḥ likhitama idaṃ puṇyaṃ jagatī sidyasyā

The languages used by Prithvi Malla in his inscription belongs to 13th century form of modern Nepali.

== Religion, language, and culture ==
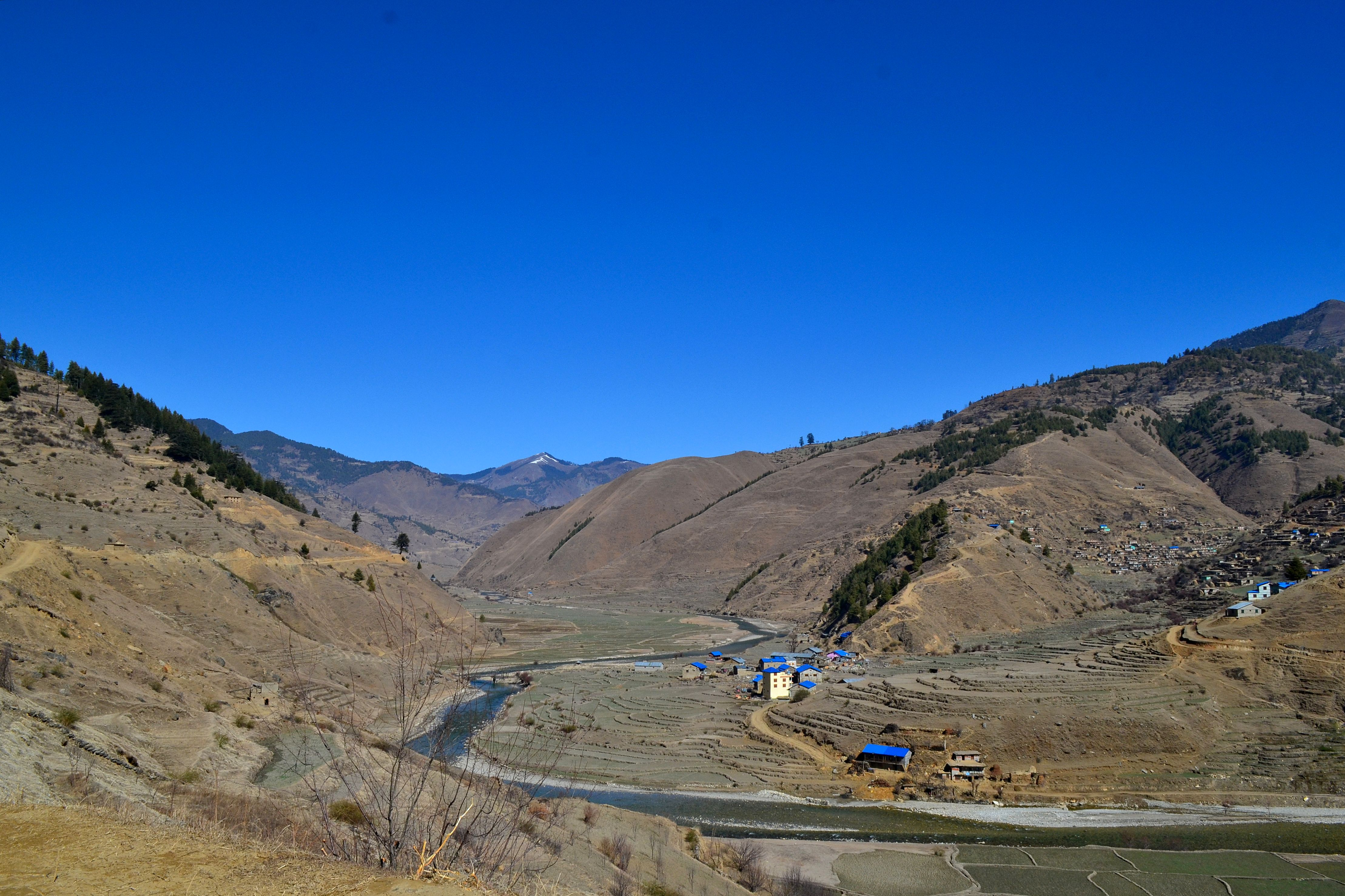
Sinja Valley, capital of the Khasa-Mallas

The language of the Khas Kingdom was Khas language and Sanskrit. Some of the earliest Devanagari script examples are the 13th century records from the sites in the former Khasa kingdom. These archaeological sites are located in Jumla, Surkhet and Dailekh districts. Sinja Valley was the ancient capital city and powerful town of the Khas Mallas between 12th and 14th century and the centre of origin of Nepali (Khas) language.

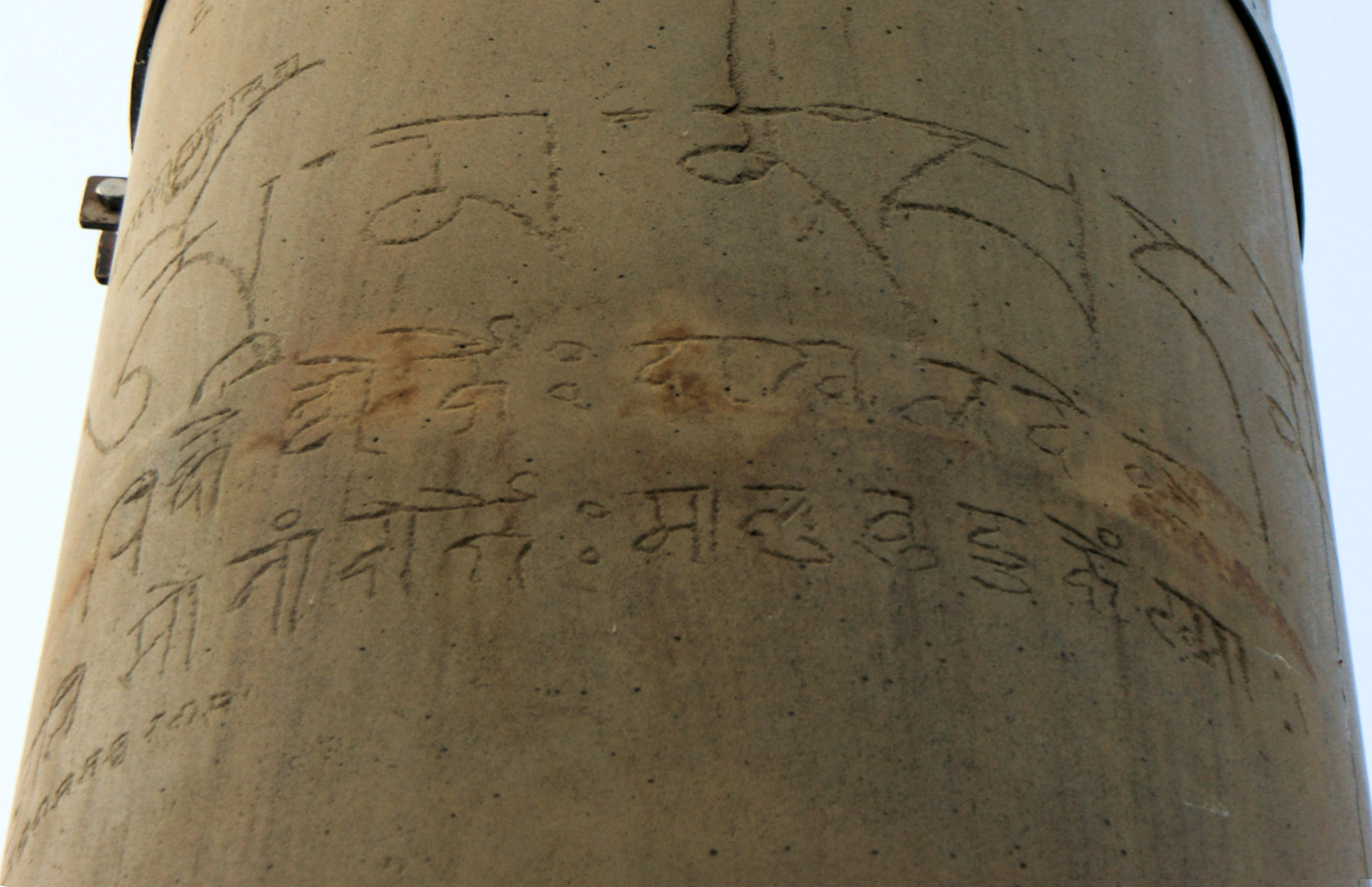
Lumbini pillar inscription by King Ripu Malla: "Om mani padme hum May Prince Ripu Malla be long victorious"

Most of the initial Khas kings before Pṛthvīmalla were Buddhist. Though many religious traditions of the Khas developed through several historical stages. Early Khas communities practiced forms of local Himalayan shamanism, particularly the worship of Masto deities and other practices which still remains common in parts of western Nepal. Theories propose that the Masto deity worship culture has origins with the Sinja Valley in Karnali and later known to have spread to Bajhang, Bajura & Uttarkhand. Hinduisation of the kingdom began when King Ripumalla commenced the southward expansion of the kingdom and contacts to India slowly increased. King Pṛthvīmalla always used Buddhist syllables in his inscription though he had a strong preference for Hinduism. The Prashasti of Dullu inscription by Pṛthvīmalla shows Buddhist syllables, mantra, and invocations, however, the latter Kanakapatra of Shitushka was fundamentally Hindu. These two inscriptions of King Pṛthvīmalla showed the transition of the state from Buddhism to Hinduism. The reign of King Punya Malla and Prithvi Malla had strict traditional Hindu ritual and customs. A Buddhist-Hindu shrine Kakrebihar has a signboard referring it to the reign of King Ashok Challa but as per experts, it could belong to the reign of King Krachalla.

== Rulers ==
=== Titles, ranks, and suffixes ===
The successors of King Nāgarāja adhered to some suffix as -illa and -challa like King Chapilla, King Krachalla. Challa and Malla were titles of kings and princes. The change of the suffix from -challa to Malla remains debated among historians. Rāulā was the title of a high-ranking official. Personalities like Malayavarma, Medinivarma, Samsarivarma, Balirāja, (Note: Balirāja went on to become sovereign king of Jumla and founder of Kalyal dynasty.) etc. had title of Rāulā. Mandalesvara or Mandalik was a title conferred on powerful persons of the Kingdom. Royal princes, senior officials and defeated Kings were appointed to the post of Mandalesvara.

=== Regnal list ===
The Dullu stone pillar inscription dated 1279 Shaka Samvat (1357 A.D.) of King Prithvi Malla consists the following names of his predecessors: 1. Krachalla 2. Ashokachalla 3. Jitari Malla 4. Akshaya Malla 5. Ashoka Malla 6. Ananda Malla 7. Ripu Malla 8. Sangrama Malla 9. Jitari Malla 10. Aditya Malla

The list of Khas kings mentioned by Giuseppe Tucci is in the following succession up to Prithvi Malla:

- Nāgarāja (Nepali: नागराज); also known as Jāveśvara or Nagadeva by Tibetan chronicles including a Chronicle of Fifth Dalai Lama
- Chaap/Cāpa (Nepali: चाप; IAST: Cāpa); son of Nāgarāja
- Chapilla/Cāpilla (Nepali: चापिल्ल; IAST: Cāpilla), son of Cāpa
- Krashichalla (Nepali: क्राशिचल्ल; IAST: Krāśicalla), son of Cāpilla
- Kradhichalla (Nepali: क्राधिचल्ल; IAST: Krādhicalla), son of Krāśicalla
- Krachalla (Nepali: क्राचल्ल; IAST: Krācalla), son of Krādhicalla (1207 CE–1223)
- Ashoka Challa (Nepali: अशोक चल्ल; IAST: Aśokacalla), son of Krācalla (1223–87)
- Jitari Malla (Nepali: जितारी मल्ल; IAST: Jitārimalla), first son of Aśokacalla
- Ananda Malla (Nepali: आनन्द मल्ल; IAST: Ānandamalla), second son of Aśokacalla
- Ripu Malla (Nepali: रिपु मल्ल; IAST: Ripumalla) (1312–13), son of Ānandamalla
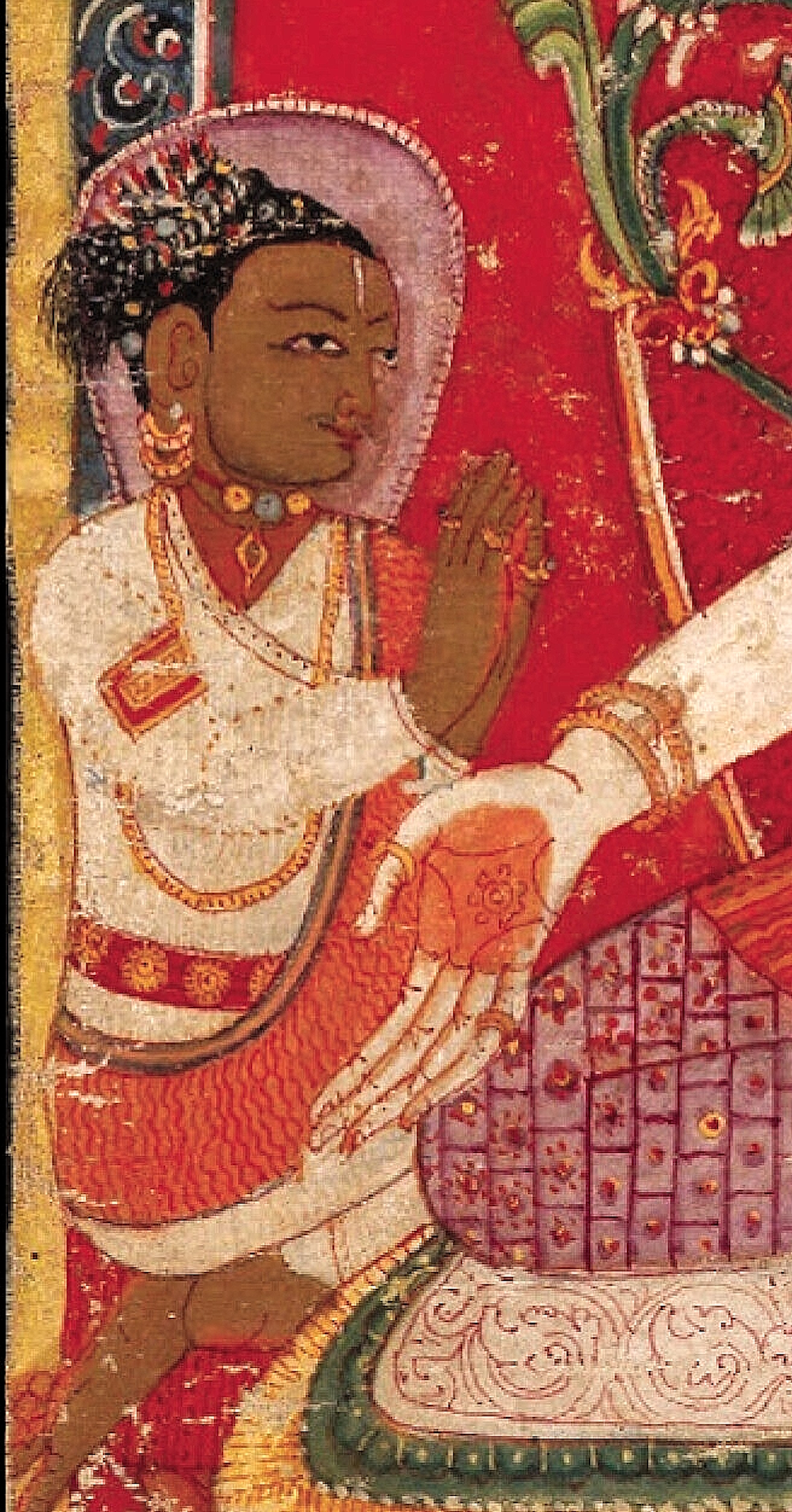
  Ripu Malla, son of Ananda Malla, c. 1312 (Tibet Museum, ABP 038)
- Sangrama Malla (Nepali: संग्राम मल्ल; IAST: Saṃgrāmamalla), son of Ripumalla

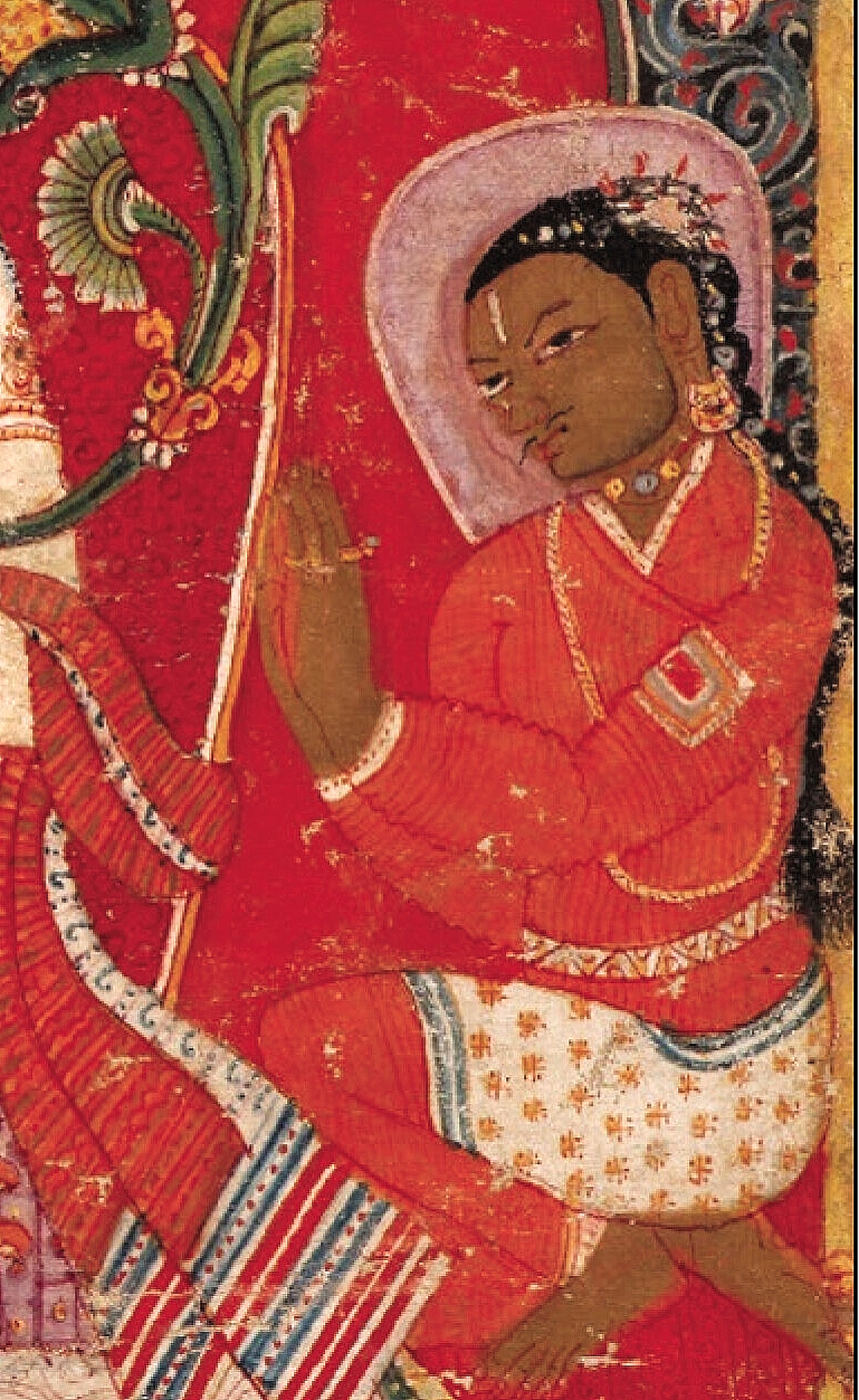
Samgrama Malla, son of Ripu Malla, c. 1312 (Tibet Museum, ABP 038)

- Aditya Malla (Nepali: आदित्य मल्ल; IAST: Ādityamalla), son of Jitārimalla
- Kalyana Malla (Nepali: कल्याण मल्ल; IAST: Kalyāṇamalla), son of either Ādityamalla or Saṃgrāmamalla
- Pratapa Malla (Nepali: प्रताप मल्ल; IAST: Pratāpamalla), son of Kalyāṇamalla, had no scions
- Punya Malla (Nepali: पुण्य मल्ल; IAST: Puṇyamalla) of another Khas family of (Purang royalty)
- Prithvi Malla (Nepali: पृथ्वी मल्ल; IAST: Pṛthvīmalla), son of Puṇyamalla
- Surya Malla (Nepali: सूर्य मल्ल) Son of Ripu Malla, Nāgarāja clan back to rule
- Abhaya Malla (Nepali: अभय मल्ल) son of Surya Malla (1376-1391)

=== Tibetoloical list ===
The list of rulers of Khasa (Tibetan: Ya rtse) Kingdom established by the Tibetologists Luciano Petech, Roberto Vitali and Giuseppe Tucci are:

- Naga lde (Nepali: Nāgarāja) (early 12th century)
- bTsan phyug lde (Nepali: Cāpilla) (mid-12th century)
- bKra shis lde (Nepali: Krāśicalla) (12th century)
- Grags btsan lde (Nepali: Krādhicalla) (12th century) brother of bTsan phyug lde)
- Grags pa lde (Nepali: Krācalla) (fl. 1225)
- A sog lde (Nepali: Aśokcalla) (fl. 1255–1278) son
- 'Ji dar sMal (Nepali: Jitārimalla) (fl. 1287–1293) son
- A nan sMal (Nepali: Ānandamalla) (late 13th century) brother
- Ri'u sMal (Nepali: Ripumalla) (fl. 1312–1314) son
- San gha sMal (Nepali: Saṃgrāmamalla) (early 14th century) son
- A jid smal (Nepali: Ādityamalla) (1321–1328) son of Jitari Malla
- Ka lan smal (Nepali: Kalyāṇamalla) (14th century)
- Par t'ab smal (Nepali: Pratāpamalla) (14th century)
- Pu ni sMal/Puṇya rMal/bSod nams (Nepali: Puṇyamalla) (fl. 1336–1339) of Purang royalty (another Khas family)
- sPri ti sMal/Pra ti rmal (Nepali: Pṛthvīmalla) (fl. 1354–1358) son

== Decline ==
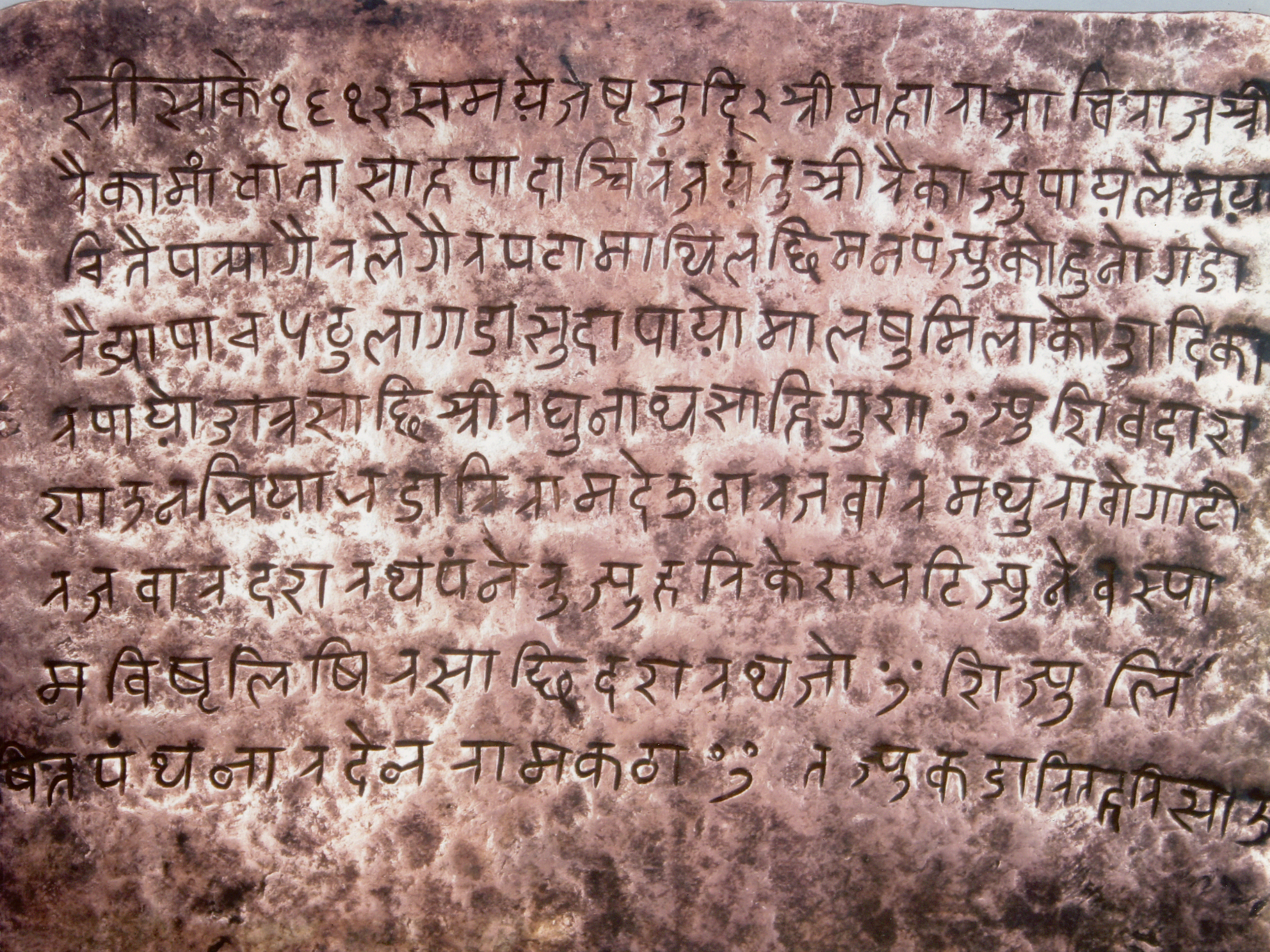
Copper Inscription by Baise King of Doti, Raika Mandhata Shahi at Saka Era 1612 (शाके १६१२) (or 1747 Bikram Samvat), c. AD 1690/91 in old Khas language using Devanagari script.

After the siege of Chittorgarh in 1303, large immigration of Rajputs into Nepal occurred. Before it, few small groups of Rajputs had been entering into the region from Muslim invasion of India. These immigrants were quickly absorbed into the Khas community due to larger similarities. Historian and Jesuit Ludwig Stiller considers the Rajput interference to the politics of Khas Kingdom of Jumla was responsible for its fragmentation and he explains:

Though they were relatively few in number, they were of higher caste, warriors and of a temperament that quickly gained them the ascendancy in the princedoms in the Jumla Kingdom, their effect on the kingdom was centrifugal.

— Ludwig Stiller's "The Rise of House of Gorkha"

Francis Tucker also further states that "the Rajputs was so often guilty of base ingratitude and treachery to gratify his ambition. They were fierce, ruthless people who would stop at nothing." After the late 13th century the Khas empire collapsed and divided into Baise Rajya (22 principalities) in Karnali-Bheri region and Chaubise rajya (24 principalities) in Gandaki region.

The 22 principalities were

- Jumla
- Doti
- Jajarkot
- Bajura
- Gajur
- Biskot
- Malneta
- Thalahara
- Dailekh
- Dullu
- Duryal
- Tulsipur
- Dang
- Salyan
- Chilli
- Phalawagh
- Jehari
- Darnar
- Atbis
- Gotam
- Majal
- Gurnakot
- Rukum

The 24 principalities were

- Gorkha
- Lamjung
- Tanahun
- Kaski
- Nuwakot
- Dhor
- Satahun
- Garahun
- Rishing
- Ghiring
- Paiyun
- Parbat
- Galkot
- Palpa
- Gulmi
- Argha
- Khanchi
- Musikot
- Isma
- Dhurkot
- Bajhang
- Bhirkot
- Pyuthan
- Butwal

== See also ==
- Khasas
- Khasa Prakrit
- Himalaya Kingdom
