= Sedhain =

Sedhai
- Pronunciation: /seɖʱaːi/
- Language: Nepali

Origin
- Language: Khas
- Region of origin: Karnali or Kumaon

Other names
- Variant forms: Sedai; Sedhai; Sedhyan; Sedndai
- Derivatives: Sedhai Upadhya; Sedhai Jaisi; Sedhai Khatri (K.C.)

Sedhai, Sedhain, or Sedai (Nepali: सेढाई) is a surname of the Khas people of Nepal, found among Nepalese Hindu communities such as Bahun and Chhetri. The surname is traditionally associated with the Angiras Gotra and is borne by families across Nepal. It is also found among the Nepalese diaspora worldwide.

== Etymology ==
The origin of the Sedhai surname is uncertain. Some online sources trace it to Sedha village in the Sinja Valley of Karnali Province, Nepal, classifying it as a Purbiya Bahun surname. Other online sources claim that it originated in the Kumaon region of Uttarakhand, India, classifying it as a Kumai Bahun surname. Although its exact origin remains unverified, Sedhai is generally recognized as a Bahun surname of Khas origin. According to the Sedhai Banshawali (family genealogy), several other Nepwli surname Banshawalis, and historical land records of Lamjung, Ramakanta Sedhai served as Senapati (General) during the early years of the Rana dynasty under Jung Bahadur Rana in the Kingdom of Nepal, documenting that at least one member held a prominent military position.

== Family traditions ==
The Sedhai surname belongs to the Angiras Gotra. They are traditionally followers of Hindusim and Khas Shamanic tradition known as Kulpuja, Dewali, or Masto. They worship one of the many Masto deities as their family deity (Kuldeuta).

Khas shamanism, also known as Masto tradition, is an indigenous religious tradition of the hill-dwelling Khas people of the lower Himalayas. Traditional ritual include offerings and ritual sacrifice of black and white goats or sheep.

== Notable people ==
- Ramakanta Sedhai, Senapati of Lamjung during the Rana dynasty
