= Doti =

Doti सुदुर पश्चिमाञ्चल - Sudura Paścimāñcala
- Former region
- Far-Western Development Region
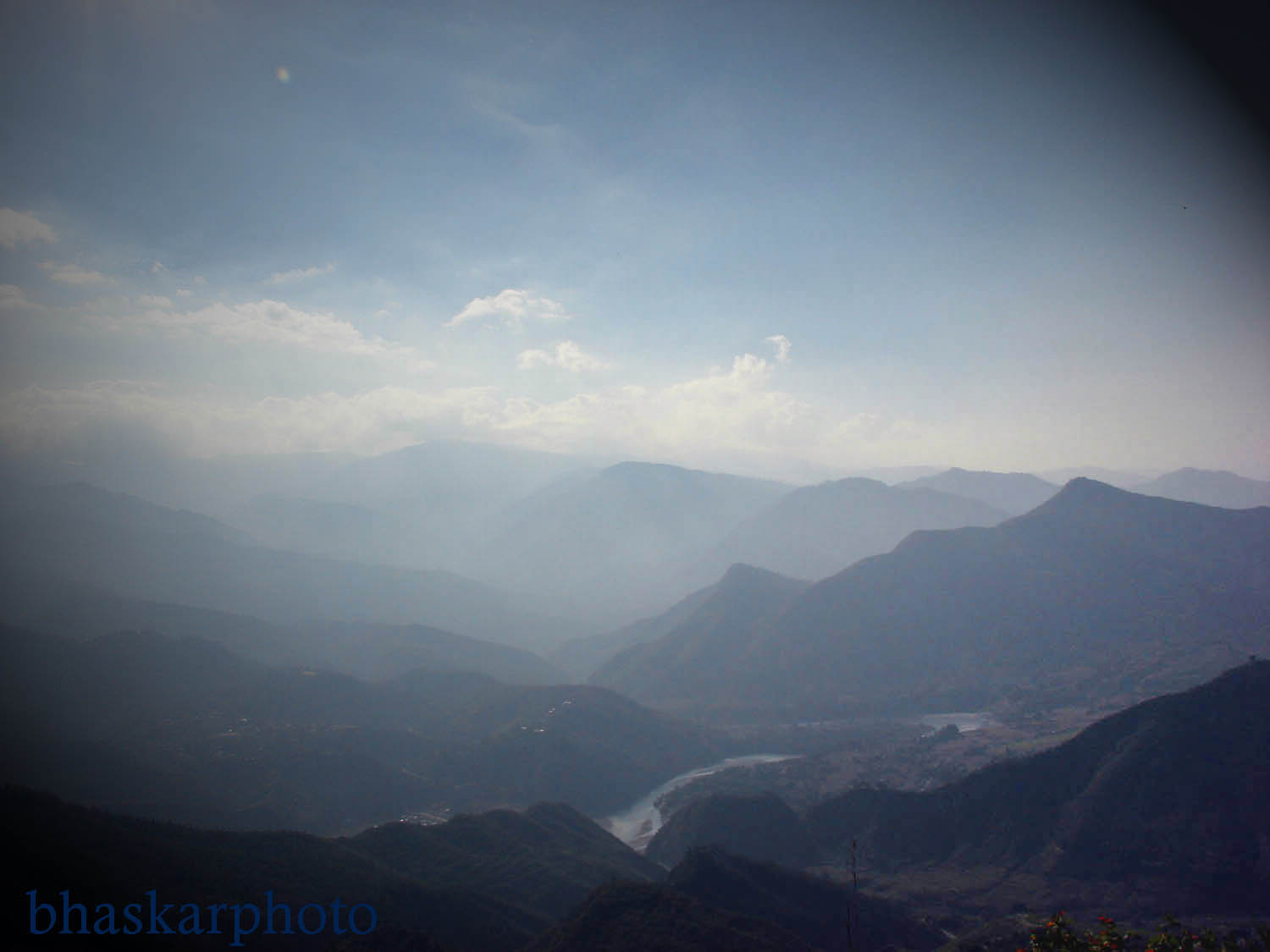
- Seti River valley with Dipayal to the left

- Location of the Far-Western Region
- Country: Nepal
- Headquarters: Dipayal Silgadhi

Area
  - Total: 19,539 km^{2} (7,544 sq mi)

Population (2011)
  - Total: 2,552,517
  - Density: 130.64/km^{2} (338.35/sq mi)
- Time zone: UTC+5:45 (NPT)
- ISO 3166 code: NP-5

Doti (Nepali: डोटी), also known as Dotigarh (डोटीगढ़) or the Far-Western Development Region was a development region of Nepal situated between River Kali bordering Kumaon division of Uttarakhand, India in the west and the Karnali river on the east. Doti was one of eight different princely states of the Katyuri Kingdom.

== Districts ==
Doti covered the nine districts of modern Sudurpashchim Province combined into two zones. They are:

- Darchula District
- Baitadi District
- Dadeldhura District
- Kanchanpur District
- Doti District
- Kailali District
- Bajhang District
- Bajura District
- Achham District

Kailali and Kanchanpur District are in the Terai area and the rest are mountainous.

== Etymology ==
The name Doti is believed to have originated from the word Doab which means the land area between the confluence of two rivers.

Other view is that the original name of Doti was devatavi = dev + aatavi or aalaya (dev meaning Hindu God and aatavi meaning the place of re-creation or the place of attaining a meditation in Sanskrit).

== History ==
Doti was an ancient kingdom in far western region of Nepal which was formed after the disintegration of the Katyuri Kingdom of Kumaon around the 13th century.

Doti was one of eight different princely states Katyuri Kingdom was divided into Eight for their eight Prince and became different independent Kingdom.

- Baijnath-Katyur
- Dwarahat
- Doti
- Baramandal
- Askot
- Sira
- Sora
- Sui (Kali kumaon)

Later on, the whole land between Ramganga on the west (Kumaon) and the Karnali on the east came under the Raikas after the origin of Raikas of Katyuris in Doti.

"Brahma Dev Mandi" at Kanchanpur District of Mahakali Zone was established by Katyuri king Brahma Dev.

=== Raikas of Doti ===
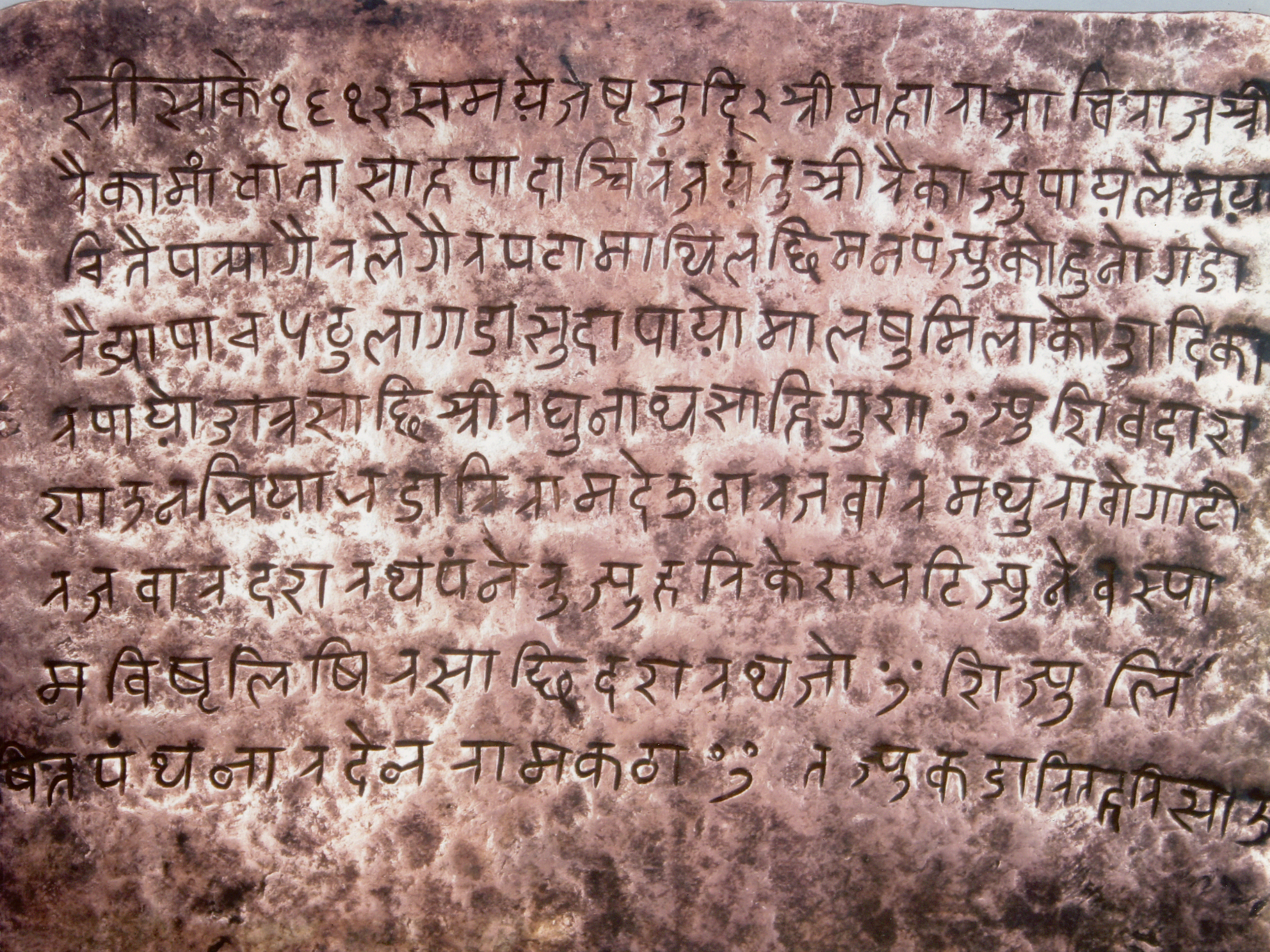
Copper Inscription by King of Doti, Raika Mandhata Shahi at Saka Era 1612 (शाके १६१२) (or 1747 Bikram Samvat) in old Malla language using Devanagari script

Niranjan Malla Dev was the founder of Doti Kingdom around the 13th century after the fall of the Katyuri Kingdom. He was the son of Last Katyuris of united Katyuris kingdom.

Kings of Doti were called Raikas (also Rainka Maharaj). Later on Raikas, after defeating the Khas Malla of Karnali Zone, were able to establish a strong Raika Kingdom in Far Western Region of Nepal (Doti) . So far, the historical evidences of following Raikas have been discovered:

- Niranjan Malla Dev (Founder of Doti Kingdom)
- Nagi Malla (1238)
- Ripu Malla (1279)
- Nirai Pal (1353): maybe of Askot his historical evidence of 1354 A.D has been found in Almora too
- Nag Malla (1384)
- Dhir Malla (1400)
- Ripu Malla (1410)
- Anand Malla (1430)
- Balinarayan Malla: not known
- Sansar Malla (1442)
- Kalyan Malla (1443)
- Suratan Malla (1478)
- Kriti Malla (1482)
- Prithivi Malla (1488)
- Medini Jay Malla (1512)
- Ashok Malla (1517)
- Raj Malla (1539)
- Arjun Malla/Shahi: not known but he was ruling Sira as Malla and Doti as Shahi
- Bhupati Malla/Shahi (1558)
- Sagaram Shahi (1567)
- Hari Malla/Shahi (1581): last Raikas King of Sira
- Rudra Shahi (1630)
- Vikram Shahi (1642)
- Mandhata Shahi (1671)
- Raghunath Shahi (1690)
- Hari Shahi (1720)
- Hrishna Shahi (1760)
- Deep Shahi (1785),
- Prithivi pati Shahi (1790): he had fought against Nepali Ruler (Gorkhali Ruler) with British in 1814 A.D.

=== Mogul invasion on Far-Western Nepal ===
During the period of Akbar's rule in the 16th century, the Moguls had attacked the Raikas of Doti. They invaded Ajemeru, capital of the Raika Kingdom. Ajemeru is now in Dadeldhura District of far western region of Nepal. Hussain Khan, army chief of Akbar residing in Lucknow had led the attack. According to `Abd al-Qadir Bada'uni (c. 1540 - 1615), Indo-Persian historian during Mughal Empire, Mughal Army chief of Lucknow, Hussain Khan, lured by the wealth and treasures of the kingdom of the Raikas, wanted to plunder the state, this being the motive behind the assault; he managed to capture some cities and after his successful campaign he returned to Lucknow.

=== Gorkha Invasion ===
The historic place of war between the Doti Kingdom and Nepal (Gorkha Kingdom) during the period of Gorkha Expansion in 1790, according to the history of Nepal, is Nari-Dang which lies on the bank of the Seti River and Dumrakot was the base of the Doti Kingdom during the fighting against the Gorkhalis. In the war with the Gorkhalis, the Doti kingdom was defeated and Doteli King fled to Pilibhit.

== Khairgarh-Singhai State ==
Raja Deep Shah of Surajbanshi clan was expelled from Nepal in 1790 A.D and on arriving to Terai of Oudh (now Lakhimpur Kheri District of Uttar Pradesh of India) he established Khairgarh-Singhai State in Khairigarh under British India. Kanchanpur Praganna (now the District of Kaillali and Kanchanpur of Nepal) was also the parts of his State or Zamindari. He succeeded in defeating the Banjaras rulers of Khairigarh and establishing himself not only in that Pargana but also in parts of Bhur

== Geography ==
The Far-Western Development Region has Karnali province to the east, Uttar Pradesh (India) to the south, Uttarakhand (India) to the west and the Tibet Autonomous Region (People's Republic of China) to the north.

The highest mountain in the region is the Api Peak, with 7,132 m (23,399 ft) high; it is in the Darchula district. Other high mountain is Saipal, 7,031 m (23,068 ft) high, in the Bajhang district.

The most important rivers in the Far-Western Development Region are the Seti and the Mahakali rivers; both rivers are tributaries of the Karnali river.

== Demographics ==
It is the smallest Development Region of Nepal with an area of 19,539 km^{2} (7,544 sq mi) and also with the lowest population with 2,552,517 people living there; its population density is the second lowest of all the regions, with 130.6 persons/km^{2}. Main ethnic group are Khas/Chhetri making total population of 76%.

== Language and culture ==
The major local languages are Dotiyali and Nepali each spoken respectively by 273,000 and 788,000 people according to the 2011 census.

Inhabitants of two terai districts Kailali District and Kanchanpur District speak different languages. Rana-tharu and Dangaura-tharu speaks their own language. Language spoken by Rana-tharus and Dangaura-tharu speak variousTharu Languages.

Traditional dance and songs Chholiya, Bhada, Jhora Chhapeli, Rung Culture of Rung people (Sauka), Baira song, Deuda, Chait and Jagar are part of the culture. Jagar and Chait tales of bravery is most important culture in Doti since Katyuri period. Chait tales about bravery of Senapati Piri Bohara (Doti) is singing in Gaura Parva . Jhusia Damai of Baskot of Baitadi District was famous Jagar singer. The major festivals of Doti are mainly Gora (Gamra), Holi, Bishpati, Harela, Raksha Bandhan, Dasain, Makar Sankranti, and others.

== See also ==
- Doti District
- Sudurpashchim Province
- Doteli
- Baitada
- Far-Western Development Region, Nepal
