= Harela Mela =

- Observed by: Kumaoni people
- Type: Fair
- Significance: Harvest festival
- Date: 16 - 21 July
- Duration: 5 days
- Frequency: Annual

Harela Mela is a fair that takes place every year from 16 July to 21 July and is usually held on the RamLeela Ground in Bhimtal. The Harela Mela commemorates celebrations surrounding the historic Kumaon festival of Harela in the state of Uttarakhand.

== Significance ==
Harela literally means "Green/Yellow Leaves" . There are traditionally two Harela’s in a year, one in the Chaitra month of the Hindu Calendar (March / April in the Gregorian Calendar) and one in the Shravan month of the Hindu Calendar (July / August in the Gregorian Calendar), corresponding to the change of seasons. However the Harela Mela itself is held as part of the Shravan festivities which also aligns with the start of the monsoon season in India and symbolizes the crop growing season. According to local folklore, the festival also commemorates the wedding of Lord Shiva and the Goddess Parvati.

== History of the Harela Mela ==
The Harela Mela itself has survived over 100 years. The Harela Mela possibly evolved as an extension of a farmer’s market around the harvest season. Prior to Indian independence, traders transported crops and other wares from far off places in the planes like Bareilly, Rampur, etc. to the hills of Kumaon to sell. People from the hills of Kumaon would gather to purchases these products and over time this became the Harela Mela. The Mela itself was previously held in the city centre on the ground near Lilavati Pant College but was shifted to its present location on the RamLeela ground in 1980 due to insufficient space. Prior to 2013 the fair was a 2 day event organized by the Harela Khel Sanskritik Manch but owing to increasing popularity was taken over by the town municipal corporation and converted to a 5 day affair.

== Political Significance ==
The fair also has a traditionally political aspect to it. Various local political bodies put up stalls to increase party awareness as well as recruit party members into their fold. Prior to Indian Independence, this was a meeting occasion for various freedom activists. Politicians like Narayan Dutt Tiwari started off their career by attending political programmes organized at this fair.
