= Chand dynasty =

Medieval Indian Chand dynasty of Kumaon (700–1790 C.E.)

Chand dynasty Kurmanchal
- 11th century–1790 CE
- Status: Sovereign state
- Capital: Baijnath (600–1200); Champawat (1200–1563); Almora (1563–1791)
- Common languages: Kumaoni, Sanskrit
- Religion: Hinduism
- Government: Monarchy
- Raja (King)
  - 700 CE – 721 CE (legendary): Som Chand (legendary)
  - 1374–1419 CE: Garur Gyan Chand
  - 1488–1503 CE: Kirti Chand
  - 1560–1568 CE: Balo Kalyan Chand
  - 1638–1678 CE: Baz Bahadur Chand
  - 1788–1790 CE: Mahendra Chand
- History
  - Established: 11th century
  - Disestablished: 1790 CE
Preceded by
Khasas
Kuninda kingdom
Katyuri kingdom
Succeeded by
Khasa Malla Kingdom
Kingdom of Nepal
- Today part of: India; Nepal

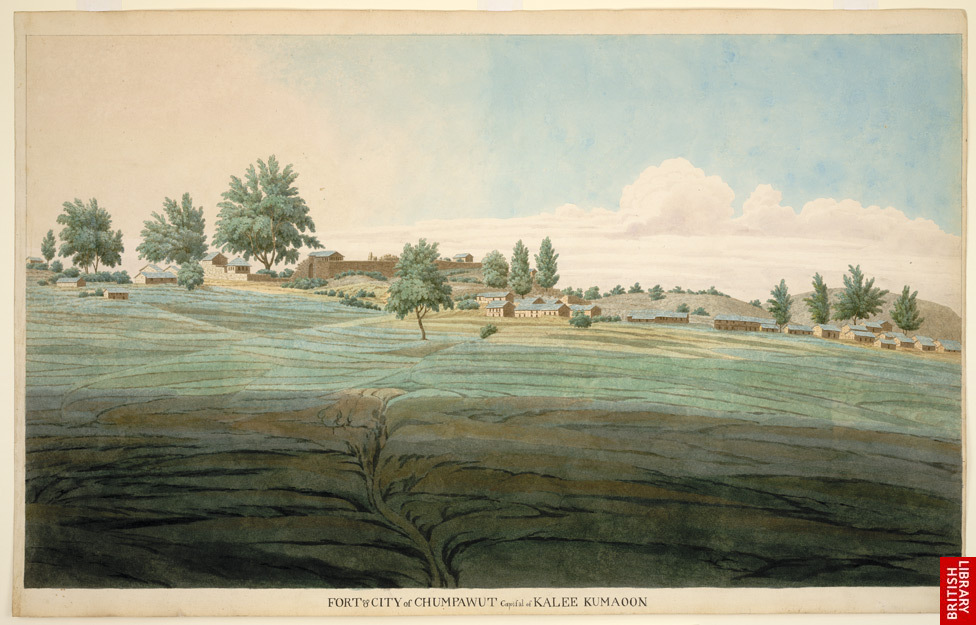
Fort and the capital city of Kali Kumaon, Champawat, 1815.

The Chand dynasty was a kingdom that ruled the Kumaon area in present-day Uttarakhand state of India, after the decline of the Katyuri kingdom. At times, their rule also extended to the western parts of present-day Nepal. Somchand established the dynasty, establishing his capital at Rajbunga in present-day Champawat.

The traditional genealogical lists of the Chand dynasty date their founder's ascension to as early as the 7th century, but historical evidence suggests that the Chand rule began only in the early 11th century. Their rule ended in 1790, when Bahadur Shah of Nepal invaded the region, forcing the last king - Mahendra Chand - to flee.

== History ==
=== Origin ===
Several traditional genealogical lists (vamshavalis) of the Chand dynasty are available, but these are not completely reliable, having been compiled in the mid-19th century. According to such traditional lists and chronicles, Som (or Soma) Chand established the Chand dynasty in the 7th century. Based on this, an 1849 British Raj-era report assigned the start of the Chand rule to 685 CE (742 VS). However, historians dispute this date, as it contradicts the chronology of the Katyuri kingdom, who are known to have ruled Kumaon until the third quarter of the 10th century. For example, the Pandukeshwar copper-plate inscription attests that the Katyuri king Lalita Sura Deva was ruling Kumaon during the 9th century, and held the imperial title Parama-bhattaraka Maharajadhiraja Parmaeshvara. It also attests that his descendants continued to rule the region in the 10th century.

By the first quarter of the thirteenth century, the Chand kings appear to have been ruling in Kumaon as feudatories. For example, the 1223 CE Baleshwar Temple inscription of Krachalla Deva, a conqueror from present-day Nepal, lists his ten counsellors and feudatories. The names of three of these men suggest that they may have belonged to the Chand family: Chandra Deva, Vinaya Chand and Vidya Chand. Vina Chand, whom the three principal genealogical lists name as the 8th Chand king, was probably same as Vinaya Chand of the inscription.

The tradition states that Som Chand was an immigrant from Jhusi, a relative of the king of Kannauj, and a contemporary of the last Katyuri king Brahma Deva. Based on this, historian Krishna Pal Singh theorizes that Som Chand may have migrated to Kumaon amid the political upheaval resulting from the Ghaznavid invasion of the Kannauj kingdom during 1018-1019 CE. Singh, therefore, dates the beginning of the Chand rule to 1019-1021 CE. This dates aligns with Katyuri chronology and with the placement of the eighth Chand king Vina (Vinaya) Chand in 1223 CE.

=== Early rule ===
Som Chand continued to call his state Kurmanchal, and established its capital in Champawat in Kali Kumaon, called so, due to its vicinity to river Kali. Many temples built in this former capital city, during the 11th and 12th century exist today, this include the Baleshwar and Nagnath temples. Later their capital was shifted to Almora by Raja Kalyan Chand in 1563, when he laid the foundation of a town name 'Alam Nagar', which was also called, 'Rajapur', a name that still used and has been found inscribed on a number of copper plates of the time.

In 1581, the Chand King, Rudra Chand (1565–1597), son of Raja Kalyan Chand seized Sira defeating Raika king Hari Malla and attacked the Garhwal Kingdom for the first time, though this attack was repulsed by then king, Dularam Sah, and so were his subsequent attacks. Rudra Chand was a contemporary of Akbar, and even paid him a visit in Lahore in 1587, as a mark of his obeisance. Akbarnama mentions him as "one of the great landlords of India", and further talks about his initial hesitation in approaching the court of Akbar, it was only Raja Todar Mal himself, sent his son Kalyan Das to assure him, did his proceed to meet Akbar. Subsequently, the two met and agreed on a concord, and thus Ain-e-Akbari, written during period of Akbar, also mentions the Sarkar of Kumaon, containing 21 Mahals (a geographical unit of the times) and the revenue collected.

After death of Rudra Chand in 1597, his son, Lakshmi Chand, also continued attacks of Garhwal for many years, though he too was repulsed. He also constructed the 'Bagnath temple' at Bageshwar in 1602.

=== Peak ===
One of the most powerful rulers of the Chand dynasty was Baz Bahadur Chand (1638–78), who met Shahjahan in Delhi, and in 1655 joined forces with him to attack Garhwal, which was under its king, Pirthi Sah, and subsequently captured the Terai region including Dehradun, which was hence separated from the Garhwal kingdom. Baz Bahadur extended his territory east to Karnali river.

In 1672, Baz Bahadur started a poll tax, and its revenue was sent to Delhi as a tribute. Baz Bahadur also built the Golu Devata Temple, at Ghorakhal, near Bhimtal, after Lord Golu, a general in his army, who died valiantly at war. He also built the Bhimeshwara Mahadev Temple at Bhimtal.

Towards the end of 17th century, Chand Rajas again attacked the Garhwal kingdom, and in 1688 Udyot Chand erected several temples at Almora, including Tripur Sundari, Udyot Chandeshwer and Parbateshwer, to mark his victory over Garhwal and Doti. The Pabateshwar temple was renamed twice, to become the present Nanda Devi temple. Later, Jagat Chand (1708–20), defeated the Raja of Garhwal and pushed him away from Srinagar, and his kingdom was given to a Brahmin. However, a subsequent king of Garhwal, Pradip Shah (1717–72), regained control over Garhwal and retained Doon till 1757, when Rohilla leader Najib-ul-Daula established himself there, though he was ousted soon by Pradip Shah.

The Chand kings also defeated the Rajwars of Askot, though the latter were allowed to hold their land on the payment of a tribute.

The hill station of Binsar, 30 km from Almora was a summer retreat of the Chand kings.

In the coming years, Jagat Chand's successor, Debi Chand (1720-6) took part in the wars of Rohillas of Rohilkhand, and was defeated by the British troops.

=== Decline ===
In 1744, Ali Mohammed Khan, the Rohilla leader, sent a force into the Chand territory and penetrated through Bhimtal in the Nainital district to Almora; the resistance of Chand army, under its ruler, Kalyan Chand, was weak and ineffective, and Almora fell to the Rohillas, who stayed here for seven short months, though they were ultimately driven out, an exit made possible by paying them a sum of three lakh rupees, and hastened by the harsh terrain of the region.

This peace didn't last long as after just three months, unhappy over his lieutenants, Ali Mohammed Khan attacked again, though this time, he was stopped right at the entrance to the hills, at Barakheri, and defeated; and he made no further attempts to conquer the Kumaon kingdom, nor did the Muslim rulers of Delhi, and this remained the first and the last attack by Muslim rulers on the region. Reconciliation subsequently came into effected; troops from the hills, under Dip Chand, fought side by side with the Rohillas at Third Battle of Panipat in 1761.

In 1760, he renamed the old Parbateshwer temple as Dipchandeshwar temple.

During British rule, then divisional commissioner of Kumaon, George William Trail, got the statue of the Nanda Devi, which had been relocated to the Udyot Chandeshwar temple, from the 'Malla Mahal' (Upper Court) of Chand kings, where the present collectorate exists, and in time, the temple started being called the 'Nanda Devi temple'. The 'Talla Mahal' (Lower Court) of Chand rulers now houses the District Hospital.

Due to internal strife, in the coming thirty years the kings lost most of the land they had previously ruled in the plains, and retained only the Bhabhar region.

In early 1790, the Gurkhas invaded the Kumaon hills and Almora, they advanced by crossing River Kali, through Gangoli; and the Chands, under the titular Chand Raja, were driven to the Bhabhar and finally expelled.

The Terai and Kashipur were ceded to the British by the Nawab of Awadh in 1801, along with the rest of Rohilkhand.

Nepalese rule lasted for twenty-four years. The end came because of their repeated intrusion into British territories in the Terai from 1800 onwards. Lord Moira, the Governor-General of India, decided to attack Almora in December 1814, marking the beginning of the Anglo-Nepalese War. After the war, the old Lal Mandi fort, near Almora (present cantonment), was renamed ‘Fort Moira’.

Harak Deo Joshi, the minister of the last Chand Raja, took the side of the British, a force of 4500 men marched from Kashipur in February, 1815. Champawat was first taken in March from Pilibhit, through the Kali River. Within two months, a strong British army under Colonel Nichols attacked and captured Almora, on 26 April 1815. A truce was called the same day, and with the ratification of Treaty of Sugauli on 4 March 1816, Kumaon and Garhwal became a part of the British Raj.

== Titles ==
Chand princes used Maharajkumar, Kunwar or Gusain as title. Maharajkumar was at the start of the name, while Kunwar or Gusain was used at the end. Doti princes used Rainka. Katyuris and Chands also used Rajwar as titles.(Chand's are also referred to as (६ पल्ल्या रजबार). A Rajbar who wears a "Janev" made of 6 threads (Maximum allowed for a Hindu)).

The Kings used titles such as Sri Raja, Sri Rajadhiraj or Rajadhiraja Maharaj and sometimes Maharajadhiraj Sri Raja etc. and name ended with Deo . This Deo was used by Katyuris as well.

== List of rulers ==
Badri Datt Pandey, in his book Kumaun Ka Itihaas lists the Chand kings as following. Pandey, relying on Pandit Rudra Datta Pant, places Som Chand's ascension to 700 CE (757 VS). However, this date does not tally with the Katyuri chronology, and historical evidence suggests that Som Chand's rule began much later, probably around 1019-1021 CE.

King	Reign	Notes
Som Chand	700–721	
Atm Chand	721–740	
Purn Chand	740–758	
Indra Chand	758–778	Opened Silk Factories
Sansar Chand	778–813	
Sudha Chand	813–833	
Hamir Chand	833–856	
Vina Chand	856–869	Lost to Khas Kings
Vir Chand	1065–1080	
Rup Chand	1080–1093	
Laxmi Chand	1093–1113	
Dharm Chand	1113–1121	
Karm Chand	1121–1140	
Ballal Chand	1140–1149	
Nami Chand	1149–1170	
Nar Chand	1170–1177	
Nanaki Chand	1177–1195	
Ram Chand	1195–1205	
Bhishm Chand	1205–1226	
Megh Chand	1226–1233	
Dhyan Chand	1233–1251	
Parvat Chand	1251–1261	
Thor Chand	1261–1275	
Kalyan Chand II	1275–1296	
Trilok Chand	1296–1303	Conquered Chhakhata; Built a fort at Bhimtal
Damaru Chand	1303–1321	
Dharm Chand	1321–1344	Defeated One Lakh Army of Delhi Sultan Muhammad Bin Tughluq under Khusrau Malik in his Qarachil Expedition
Abhay Chand	1344–1374	
Garur Gyan Chand	1374–1419	Established authority over Bhabar and Terai; later lost them to nawab of Sambhal, Recaptured it by defeating Turkish Nawab of Sambhal under General Nilu Kathait
Harihar Chand	1419–1420	
Udyan Chand	1420–1421	built Baleshwar Temple at Champawat; Captured Chaugarkha
Atma Chand II	1421–1422	
Hari Chand II	1422–1423	
Vikram Chand	1423–1437	Completed Baleshwar Temple
Bharati Chand	1437–1450	Defeated Doti
Ratna Chand	1450–1488	Defeated Bams of Sor, defeated Doti again
Kirti Chand	1488–1503	annexed Barahmandal, Pali and Faldakot, Conquered Garhwal by defeating Ajaypal and made it vassal state of Kumaon
Pratap Chand	1503–1517	
Tara Chand	1517–1533	
Manik Chand	1533–1542	
Kalyan Chand III	1542–1551	
Purna Chand	1551–1555	
Bhishm Chand	1555–1560	laid foundation stone of Alamnagar lost Barahmandal to Khas Sardar Gajuwathinga
Balo Kalyan Chand	1560–1568	recaptured Barahmandal moved capital to Alamnagar and renamed it Almora; Annexed Mankot and Danpur
Rudra Chand	1568–1597	Successfully defended Terai from nawab of Kath and Gola founded the city of Rudrapur; Annexed Sira- Battle of Basantpur
Laxmi Chand	1597–1621	built Laxmeswar and Bagnath Temple at Almora and Bageshwar respectively
Dilip Chand	1621–1624	
Vijay Chand	1624–1625	
Trimal Chand	1625–1638	
Baz Bahadur Chand	1638–1678	Captured Dehradun and Hindu Pilgrimage Kailash Mansarovar defeated Garhwal and Tibet, has his kingdom from ton river till karnali
Udyot Chand	1678–1698	Defeated combined armies of Garhwal and Doti Kumaon invasion of Garhwal (1678) Kumaon invasion of Chandpur garh (1679)
Gyan Chand	1698–1708	Defeated Garhwal and expelled fateh shah from Srinagar
Jagat Chand	1708–1720	Invaded Garhwal and captured its capital Srinagar, defeated army of Garhwal
Devi Chand	1720–1726	Made Afghani Daud Khan General of Kumaon, looted Moradabad, Mughal Empire and captured villages of Mughals
Ajit Chand	1726–1729	
Kalyan Chand V	1729–1747	Defeated Rohillas
Deep Chand	1747–1777	Defeated Garhwal King Pradip Shah left him embarrassed; joined with the Afghans and Rohillas and against the Marathas in the Third battle of Panipat.
Mohan Chand	1777–1779	Defeated by King Lalit Shah of Garhwal due to treason of Joshis
Pradyumn Chand	1779–1786	Son of king Lalit Shah of Garhwal
Mohan Chand	1786–1788	Overthrew Pradyumn Shah; Became king for second time
Shiv Chand	1788	
Mahendra Chand	1788–1790	Defeated by Gorkhas

Panchpurviya

Five Rajput Clans namely: Deopa (Village Roba, Garkha Paspa), Serari (Village Sangor, Sorari Talli Malli), Puruchuda (Village Rundakot, Garkha Puruchudi), Chiral (Village Chhawati Chiral) and Paderu (Garkha Paderu) were known as Panch-purviyas. They were introduced in Doti and settled in Kumaon by King Ratan Chand (1450–1488) after granting them jagirs. These Five kind of Rajputs were relatives of the Chand kings and had matrimonial relations amongst each other. They are considered to be subcastes/clans of the Chands. After some time the Chiral family went back to Doti but other clans stayed.

== Legacy ==
The first capital of Chand rulers, Champawat, in the stronghold popularly known as Kali Kumaon, is now a district headquarters town, and hold many remnants of once powerful Chand reign, including a medieval fort, Baleshwar temple, Nagnath Temple, etc. Other temples of their reign are Golu Devata Temple, at Ghorakhal, near Bhimtal, and Bhimeshwara Mahadev Temple at Bhimtal.

== See also ==
- Kumauni people
