= Baitada =

Baitada or Baitadeli also Soradi is referred to the people of Baitadi district, Baitadeli have 2 main dialects "Soradi" and "purchudi". similar language spoken in other area like Darchula, Bhajhang, Dadeldhura, kanchanpur and kailali Districts of Nepal. Large number of population originally from Baitadi living in the adjoining area of Pithoragarh District of Uttarakhand, India like Dharchula, Baluwakot, Askot, Jauljibi, Dauda, Sunkholi, Jhulaghat, Pipali etc. also speaks the same dialects which G. A. Grierson has mentioned as the dialects of Kumaoni language. The 2021 Nepal census has revealed that 155,666 people or 0.52 per cent of Nepal's population speak Baitadeli (Baitada) dialect.
