= Askot Musk Deer Sanctuary =

Indian wildlife reserve in Uttarakhand

- IUCN category IV (habitat/species management area)
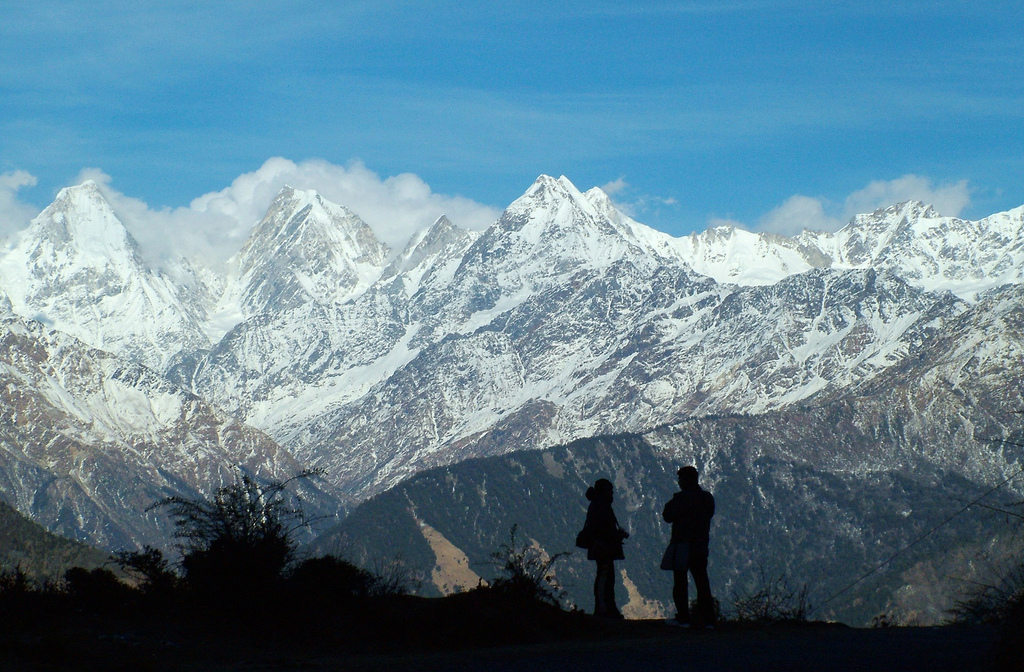
- Panchchuli Peaks, near Munsiyari, Uttarakhand

- Location within Uttarakhand Location within India
- Interactive map of Askot Musk Deer Sanctuary
- Location: Uttarakhand, India
- Nearest city: Didihat
- Coordinates: 30°07′15″N 80°39′09″E
- Area: 599.93 km^{2} (231.63 sq mi)
- Established: 1986

Askot Musk Deer Sanctuary is located 54 km (34 mi) from Pithoragarh near Askot in Uttarakhand state of India. This sanctuary has been set up primarily with the object of conserving the musk deer (Moschus leucogaster) and its habitat. Intensive efforts have been initiated to conserve this rare species. Other mammals found in this sanctuary include the Bengal tiger, Indian leopard, Himalayan jungle cat, civet, barking deer, serow, goral and Himalayan brown bear. Many species of high altitude birds are also found in this sanctuary.
