= Jhusia Damai =

Indian singer

Jhusia Damai ( झूसिया दमाई ) (1910–2005) was the great folk singer of Kumauni culture. He was born as a son of Ranuwa Dami in Baskot of Baitadi District of Nepal very close to Jhulaghat of Pithoragarh District of Uttarakhand and lived in Dhungatoil near Dharchula.
