= Qarachil Expedition =

14th century military campaign by Delhi Sultanate

- Part of campaigns of the Delhi Sultanate
Date	14th century
Location	Kumaon-Garhwal region, modern-day Uttarakhand, India
Result	Kumaon victory

Belligerents
Delhi Sultanate	Kumaon Kingdom

Commanders and leaders
Khusrau Malik	Dharam Chand (Chand Dynasty)

Strength
80,000–100,000 troops	Unknown but less

Casualties and losses
Heavy – only 3–10 survived (Note: According to Ibn Battuta, only three soldiers survived, and according to Ziya’uddin Barani, ten soldiers survived. This indicates that nearly the entire army perished during the Qarachil Expedition.)	Unknown but less

The Qarachil Expedition, also known as the Kumaon Expedition, was a military campaign undertaken by Sultan Muhammad bin Tughluq of the Delhi Sultanate during the 14th century at 1337-38CE (Note: Date of the Qarachil Expedition according to historians: Budauni: fixes the expedition in 1337–1338 CE (738 Hijri); Firishta: also supports the date 1337–1338 CE (738 Hijri). Some earlier assumptions placed the expedition as late as 1338 CE, but this is corrected by both Budauni and Firishta). The campaign aimed to secure the northern frontiers. Qarachil is also referred to as Kumaon.

== Background ==
Sultan Muhammad bin Tughluq launched the Qarachil Expedition to stabilize the northern borders of the Delhi Sultanate and suppress rebellions in the region. The area, identified with parts of modern-day Kumaon and Garhwal in Uttarakhand, was strategically significant due to its rugged terrain and its position as a frontier zone.

=== The campaign ===
The expedition, led by Khusrau Malik, was one of the largest undertaken by the Delhi Sultanate, with an estimated strength of 80,000 to 100,000 troops. Initially, the army advanced successfully through Sambhal and captured key territories, including Jidya. However, the campaign soon turned disastrous:

- Fierce resistance by Kumaoni forces: The local rulers and their troops employed guerrilla tactics, ambushing the sultanate's forces in the dense forests and rugged mountains. The Himalayan warriors, well-acquainted with the terrain, inflicted heavy casualties on the invaders.
- Strategic disruption: Kumaoni forces targeted supply lines and logistical routes, starving the sultanate’s army of essential resources.
- Adverse weather and plague: Heavy rains and freezing conditions in the mountains compounded the difficulties. The harsh climate caused widespread illness, including an outbreak of plague that devastated the sultanate’s troops.
- Logistical failures: The sultanate forces were unprepared for the extended campaign in such remote terrain. Their reliance on traditional supply lines proved to be a significant vulnerability.

== Aftermath ==
The failure of the Qarachil Expedition had far-reaching consequences:

- Military losses: A significant portion of the sultanate’s forces were lost, weakening its military.
- Economic strain: The expedition’s cost exacerbated financial pressures on the empire.
- Forced currency: After expedition Tuglaq launched brass and copper currency
- Political repercussions: Sultan Muhammad bin Tughluq’s credibility was damaged, and dissent grew within his administration.
