= Chholiya =

Dance form in India

Chholiya/Hudkeli
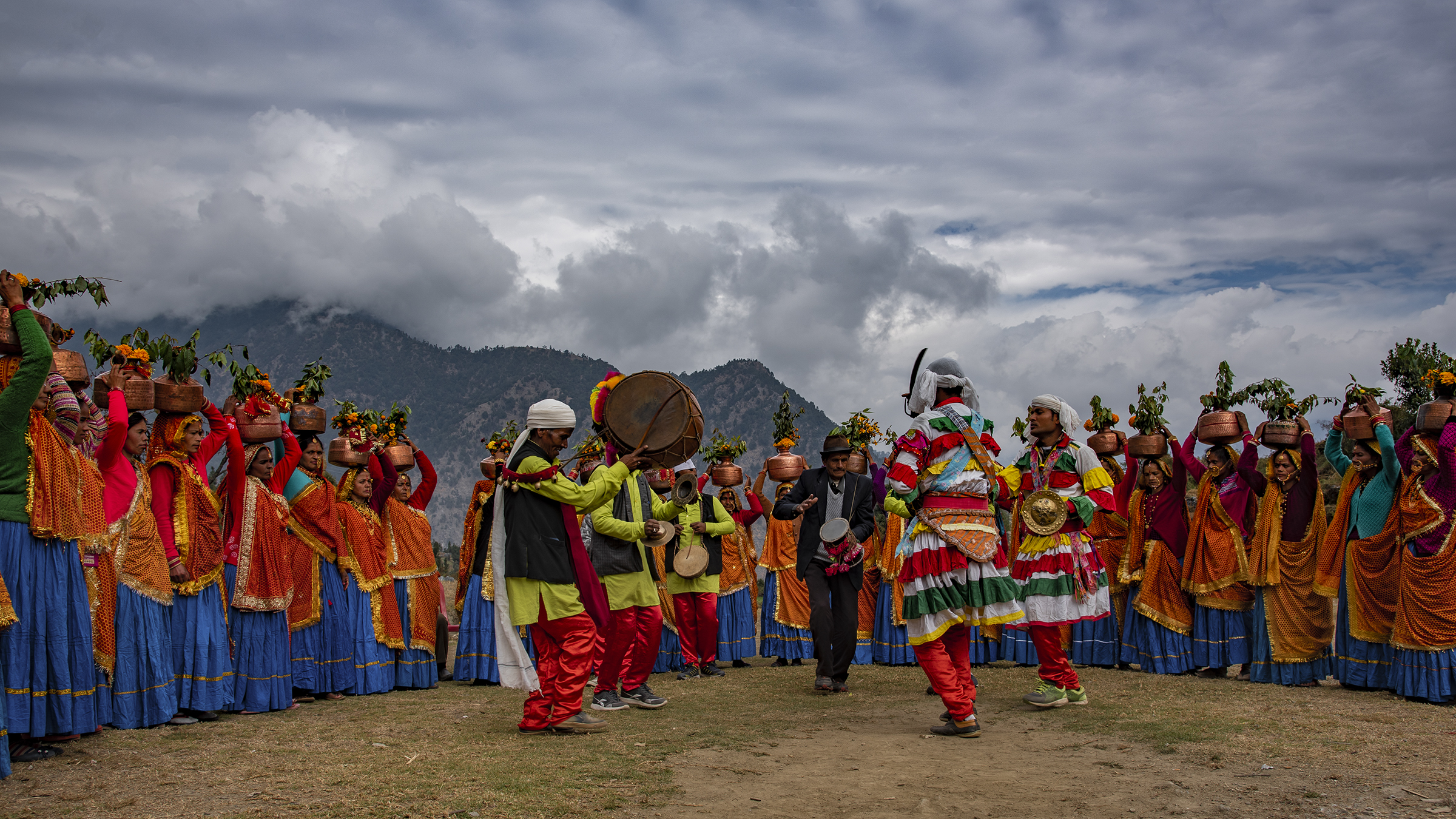
- Chholiya dancers
- Genre: Folk Dance
- Origin: Indian subcontinent (India and Nepal)

Chholiya (Kumaoni) or Hudkeli (Nepali) is a traditional folk dance form originated in the Kumaon division of the Indian state of Uttarakhand, and Sudurpashchim province of Nepal. It has today become a symbol of Kumaoni and Sudurpashchimi (mainly in Doti, Baitadi and Darchula districts) and cultures including Khas Community in Sikkim. It is basically a sword dance accompanying a marriage procession but now it is performed on many auspicious occasions.

It is especially popular in the districts of Almora, Bageshwar, Champawat and Pithoragarh of Kumaon division and in Doti, Baitadi and Darchula district of Nepal. This sword dance has a history of more than a thousand years and is rooted in the martial traditions of the Kumaoni People.

== Origin ==
Dating back over a thousand years, the dance has its origins in the warring Kshatriyas of Kumaon- the Kumaoni Rajputs and Katyuris when marriages were performed at the point of the swords.

The native Kshatriyas were united by the Chand Kings who arrived on the scene in the 10th century. The flux of immigrants Rajputs who made native kshatriyas a small minority also took on the hill customs and influenced Pahari culture with their traditions and language. The days of marriages on the point of the sword were over, but the traditions attached to it still continued.

That is why the groom is still known as Kunwar or King in Kumaon. He rides a horse in the marriage procession and wears a Khukri in his belt.

== Significance ==
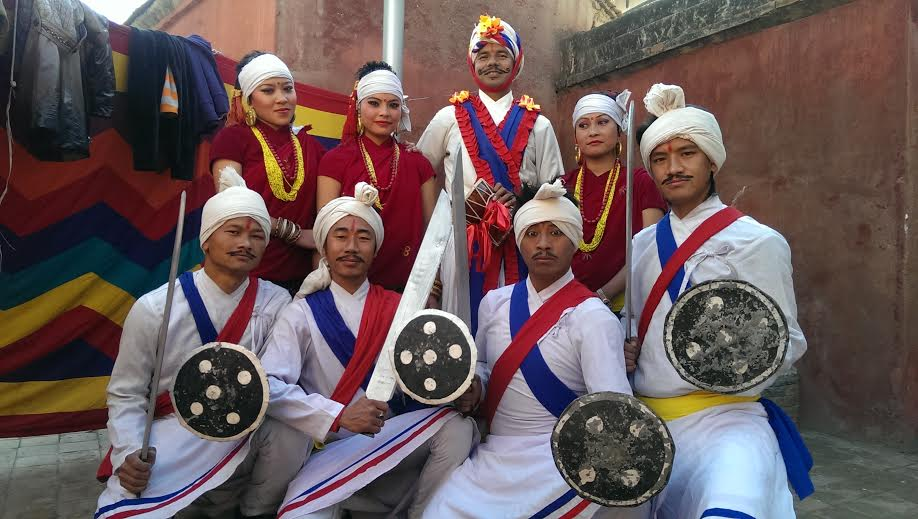
Hudkeli dancers in Nepal

Apart from its origins in the martial traditions of the people of Kumaon, it also has religious significance. This art form is mainly performed by the Rajput community in their marriage processions. Chholiya is performed in marriages and is believed to be auspicious as it provides protection from evil spirits and demons. Marriage processions were believed to be vulnerable to such spirits who target peoples happiness. It was a common belief that demons followed a marriage procession or Baryat/Barat to bewitch the newly married and performance of Chholiya could prevent this.

== Instruments ==
The turi (तुरी), nagphani (नागफनी) and ransing (रणसिंघ) belonging to the brass instrument family are traditional instruments of the Kumaon division, were earlier used in battles to increase the morale of the troops, are used.

Percussion instruments like dhol (ढोल), damau (दमाऊ) which are also native to Kumaun are played by professional musicians known as dholies.

Masakbeen (मसकबीन) or Bagpipe introduced by the British in Kumaun as instruments played in marching bands were assimilated into the wide range of instruments played.

Woodwind instruments like the nausuriya muruli (नौसुरिया मुरूली) (lit. the nine note flute) a kind of flute and jyonya (ज्योंया) (lit. twin flute) a type of double flute native to Kumaun is also played.

== Attire ==
Donning the traditional Kumauni attire white churidar payajama, the taanka on their heads, the chola, face covered with sandal wood paste as if ready for battle equipped with tulwar swords and brass shields. Their costume resembles the costume of the ancient martial warriors that inhabited Kumaun.

== Features ==
Accompanied by war-like music, equipped with swords they dance in a synchronized manner while engaging in mock fights with their fellow dancers.

Carrying the triangular red flag the "nishana" (निसाण), (banners), waving their swords, with expressions on their faces giving the impression of warriors going to battle.

There are 22 men in a full team of Chholiya dancers; 8 of them are the sword dancers and 14 are musicians.

== Forms ==
The following are the forms of Chholiya popular all over Kumaun which differ in movements

- Bisu nritya (बिसू नृत्य )
- Saraanv (mock fights) (सरांव)
- Rann Nritya (lit. war dance) (रण नृत्य)
- Sarankar (सरंकार)
- Veerangna (वीरांगना)
- Depanshu (दीपांशु)
- Chholiya Baja (छोलिया बाजा)
- Shauka Shaili (शौका शैली) native to Johar region of Kumaun
- Paitan Baja (पैटण बाजा)
