= Khasa Prakrit =

Indo-Aryan language

- खश, खष, खशीर
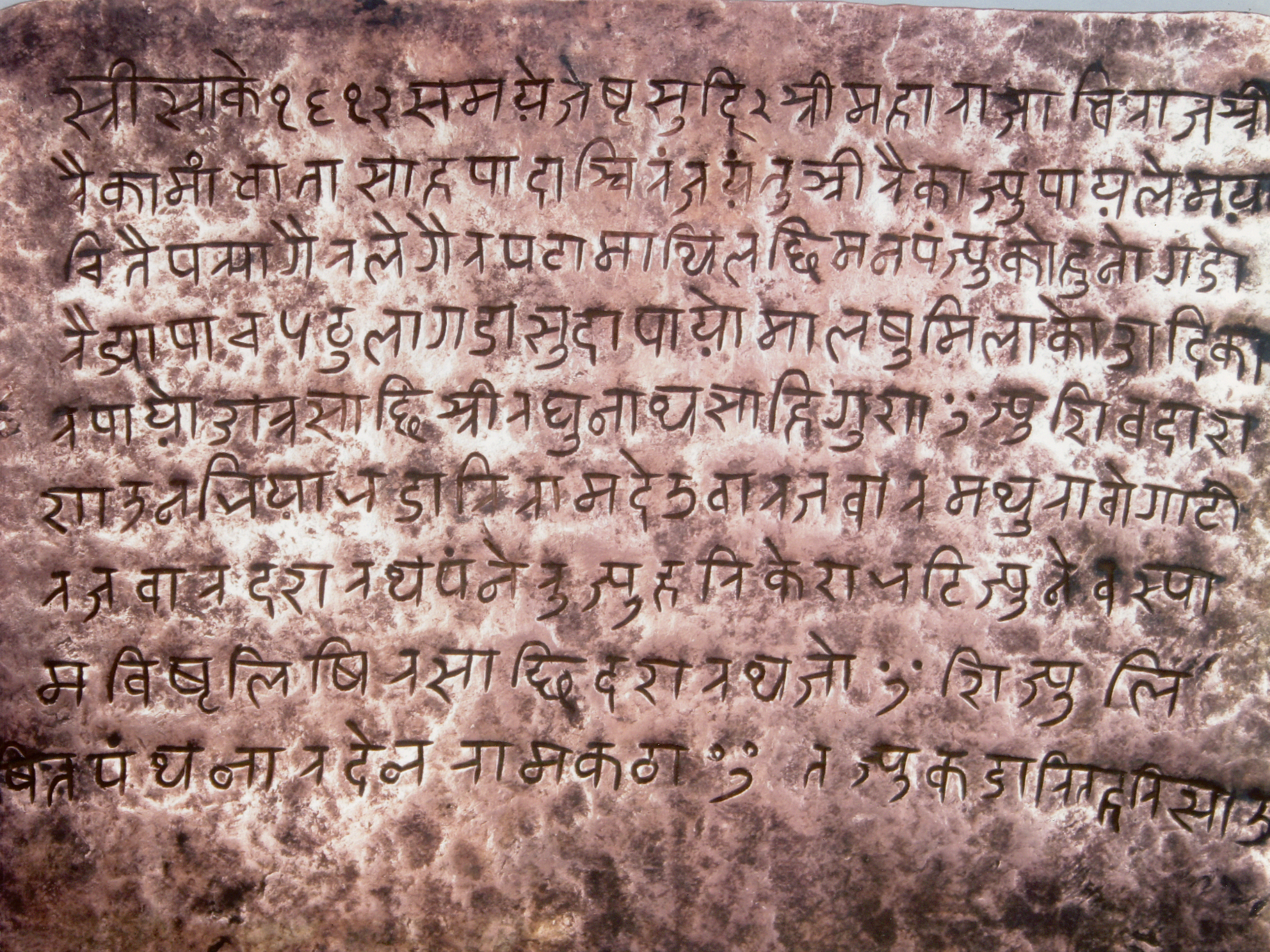
- Copper Inscription by Baise King of Doti, Raika Mandhata Shahi at Saka Era 1612 (शाके १६१२) or 1747 Bikram Samvat, (AD 1690 or 1691) in old Khas language using Devanagari script.
- Native to: Khasa Kingdom
- Region: Indian subcontinent
- Ethnicity: Khasas
- Language family: Indo-European: Indo-Iranian; Indo-Aryan; Prakrit; Khasa Prakrit

Language codes
- ISO 639-3: –
- Glottolog: None

Khasa or Khasa Prakrit (also known as Khas Prakrit, Sanskrit Khasa, Himalayan Prakrit, Northern Prakrit, Khas Kura) is a Prakrit language of medieval South Asia and a common ancestor language of the Pahari languages, which includes Nepali, Kumaoni, Jaunsari, Mandeali, Garhwali, and Mahasuvi languages. It was commonly referred to as खश (Khaśa), खष (Khaṣa), and खशीर (Khaśīra) in the Sanskrit texts.

Indian linguist Suniti Kumar Chatterji suggests that Nepali language developed from Khasa Prakrit. Khas Prakrit is named after the speakers of language, Khas people, who live in the Himalayas.

== History ==
=== Origin and development ===
Khasa belongs to the Indo-European family of languages. Like other Indo-Aryan languages, Khasa is a direct descendant of an early form of Vedic Sanskrit, through Shauraseni Prakrit and Śauraseni Apabhraṃśa (from Sanskrit apabhraṃśa "corrupt").

== Language comparison ==
Language Comparison
| | Nepali | | Kumauni | | Kashmiri |
|---|---|---|---|---|---|---|
| | Masc | Fem | Masc | Fem | Masc | Fem |
| I am | chu | chu | chic | chu | thus | ches |
| You are | chas | ches | chai | chi | chukh | chekh |
| He is | cha | che | ch | chi | chuh | cheh |

== See also ==
- Apabhraṃśa
- Prakrit
- Nepali language
