= Askot =

- Village
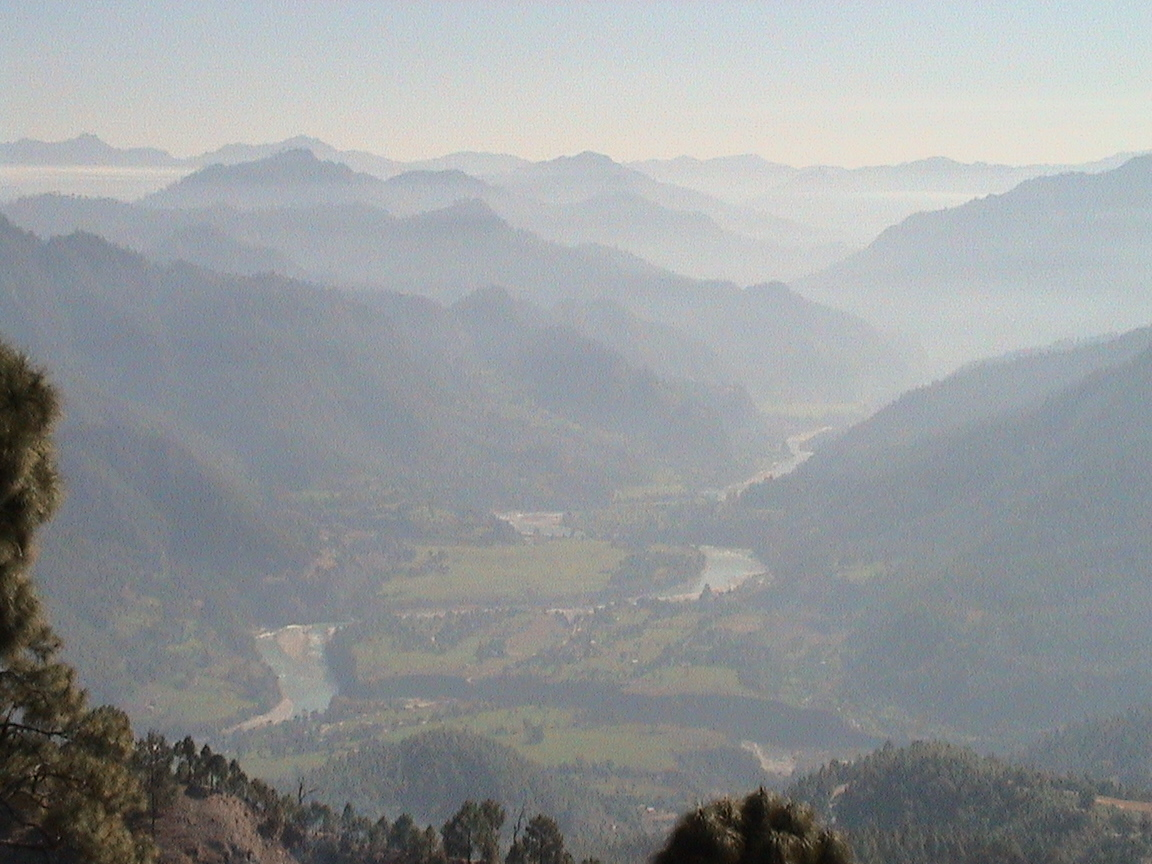
- View of Kali river valley from Askot

- Location within Uttarakhand Location within India
- Coordinates: 29.77°N 80.35°E
- Country: India
- State: Uttarakhand
- District: Pithoragarh
- Elevation: 1,106 m (3,629 ft)

Languages
  - Official: Hindi, Kumaoni
- Time zone: UTC+5:30 (IST)
- PIN: 262543
- Vehicle registration: UK
- Website: uk.gov.in

Askot or Askote is a small Himalayan town in Pithoragarh district of Uttarakhand in India. It is the part of Kanalichhina development Block and Didihat Tehsil.

The place is also famous for the Askot Musk Deer Sanctuary dedicated to the conservation of Musk deer. Askot lies midway between Pithoragarh to Dharchula road and located on a ridge. 'Kailash-Mansarovar Pilgrimage route from Delhi - Kathgodam - Didihat - Dharchula, passes through Askot.

along with surrounded regions the area was once part of Manaskhand region and came under Katyuri kings after fall of katyuris the Rajwars dynasty which was a branch katyuri kings continued to rule the region, ruled by Pal Rajput/Thakuri (Suryavanshi Rajputs, a clan of Katyuri kings), Chand, Gorkha, Raikas and British rulers, though Rajwars continue to be its ceremonial Head. Van Rawats - an endangered tribe of Uttaranchal, inhabits around this area.

== Geography ==
Askot is located at 29.77°N 80.35°E. It has an average elevation of 1,106 metres (3,629 feet). It is located on the Gori Ganga- Kali river geographical divide. The Fertile slopes of Garkha are situated on the front side, and Kali river and mountains of Nepal on its left.

According to early 20th-century British gazetteers, the pargana of Askot was historically divided into two distinct tracts: Malla Askot and Talla Askot. Malla Askot formed a rugged, mountainous triangle defined by the converging Gori and Kali rivers, backed by a high ridge culminating in the Chipilakot peak (approximately 14,000 feet). Talla Askot consisted of the fertile ridges lying south of the Gori river. The region exhibits a stark ecological transition based on elevation, with river valleys historically supporting shisham, khair, and sal trees, transitioning to oak and rhododendron at mid-elevations, and fir, birch, and boxwood on the highest ridges.

The area around is under heavy tunnel mining operations. There are polymetallic mines of copper, zinc, gold, silver and lead deposits.

== Origin of name ==
The name Askot is originated from Assi Kot (Eighty Forts, as the King had eighty forts under him). Many of these forts were in Darchula District of Nepal.

== History ==
Historically, Askot was ruled by a branch of the Katyuri dynasty. Following the decline of the Katyuri kingdom, a branch of the family led by Abhaya Pal established a principality in Askot in 1279 AD. The region remained an independent buffer state until 1588, when it was conquered by Rudra Chand, the King of Kumaon. Due to its strategic location between Kumaon, Nepal, and Tibet, the Chand rulers allowed the local rulers (who held the title of Rajwar) to retain semi-independent status in exchange for an annual tribute.

Administratively, at that time, Askot had two regions-Malla Askot and Talla Askot. This area came under Gorkha control (1791–1815) but the descendants continued to fight against each other. This family feud continued even after the British defeated the Gorkhas in 1815. Before Askot became Capital, the king used to live at Lakhanpur Kot, near the now Bagarihat (Bagar means river bank) village on the right bank of river Kali. It was situated at the base of Champhachal mountain. The remnants of the fort and market are still here.

Under Gurkha rule, the tribute was heavily increased and succession disputes arose. The estate went through various vicissitudes during the British era, including being temporarily sold in 1847 to satisfy a decree before being repurchased by the Rajwar in 1855.

In 1901, the population of the Askot pargana was recorded as 16,841, distributed across 142 villages. Historically, the area's economy was heavily tied to the great cross-border trade route that originated in Tanakpur and split northwards toward the Lipulekh and Darma passes. The pargana functioned as a vital trade conduit for the Darma Bhotias. While the northern villages were economically tied to the Bhotia trade and sheep breeding, the southern areas of Talla Askot were highly cultivated and prosperous enough to export surplus grain.
