= Baleshwar Temple =

Group of ancient temples located in Champawat

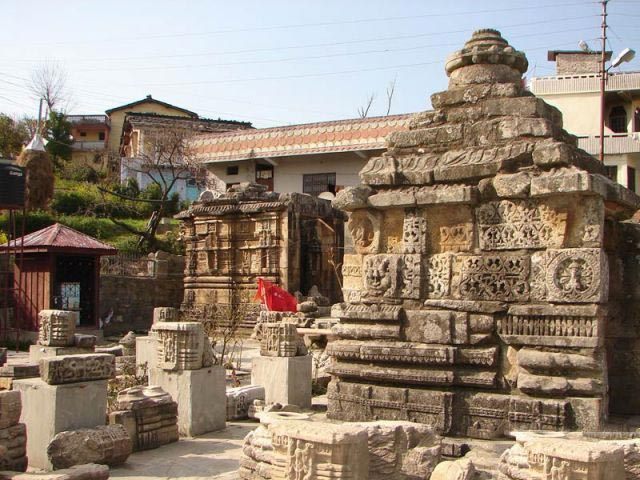

- Location in Uttarakhand

Religion
- Affiliation: Hinduism
- Deity: Baleshwar (Shiva)

Location
- Location: Champawat
- State: Uttarakhand
- Country: India
- Interactive map of Baleshwar Temple
- Coordinates: 29.3366°N 80.0904°E

Architecture
- Creator: Chand dynasty
- Completed: 10th–12th centuries AD

Baleshwar Temple is an ancient Hindu temple dedicated to Shiva, situated within city of Champawat in Uttarakhand, India. Built by the rulers of the Chand dynasty, Baleshwar Temple is a marvelous symbol of stone carving. It is believed to have been built in 13th century AD (1390 AD) by Garud Gyan Chand. Uday Chand started reconstruction work for this temple between 1420 and 1421 AD.

Hari Chand, who reigned from 1423 AD to 1427 AD, completed the reconstruction work on the temple as per a copperplate inscription (dated 1423 AD) at the temple.

== Overview ==
The main Baleshwar temple is dedicated to Shiva (who is also known as Baleshwar). There are two other temples in the compound of Baleshwar, one dedicated to Ratneshwar and other to Champawati Durga. Close to the Baleshwar Temple is a "Naula" (freshwater resource). On the day of Mahashivratri, a very crowded fair is held in the Baleshwar Temple compound.

The exteriors of Ratneshwar and Champawati Durga temples are carved with the different posters of the local deities.
