= Harela =

Hindu festival

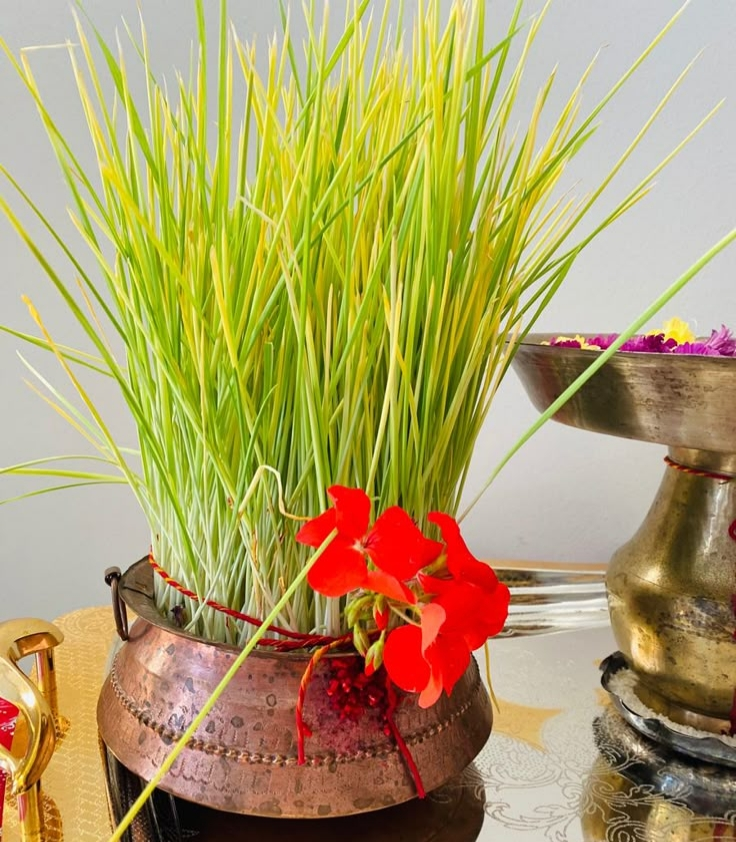
- Green shoots (Harela) symbolizing prosperity
- Also called: Mol-Sankranti or Rai-Sagran, Hariyali, Rihyali, Dakhrain
- Observed by: People of Uttarakhand, Himachal Pradesh (especially Kumaon region)
- Type: Cultural, Religious, Agricultural
- Significance: Marks the beginning of the monsoon and sowing season; symbolizes greenery, prosperity, and environmental conservation
- Celebrations: Sowing seeds, cutting green shoots (harela), planting saplings, folk songs, family gatherings
- Date: First day of the Hindu month of Shravana (Kark Sankranti) 16 July
- Frequency: Annual
- Related to: Shravan month, Monsoon festivals, Agriculture cycle

Harela is a Hindu festival celebrated in the Indian state of Uttarakhand and mainly in the Mahasu region of Himachal Pradesh This festival is very popular in the Kumaon region of Uttarakhand and is celebrated by the name Harela. This name is used in some places of Garhwal but, it is not commonly used, as the festival is celebrated as Mol-Sankranti or as Rai-Sagrān [2]. It is called Hariyali/Rihyali in the Kangra, Shimla, and Sirmaur districts, and Dakhrain in the Jubbal and Kinnaur districts of Himachal Pradesh.

This festival is celebrated on the first day of Shravan-Maas (Shravan-Sankranti/Kark-Sankranti), as per the Hindu Luni-Solar calendar. This festival marks the onset of the rainy season (monsoon) [4]. They pray for a good harvest and prosperity. Harela means "Day of Green," and Agriculture-based communities in the region consider it highly auspicious, as it marks the beginning of the sowing cycle in their fields. Multiple Kauthigs/Thols/Melas (Fairs) are also organized at this festival.

== Significance and Celebration in Kumaon ==
Harela has great significance in Kumaon. This symbolizes a new harvest and the rainy season. It has become a common practice to attribute the slogan "Save the Environment" to Harela. Schools in Uttarakhand often encourage their students to plant saplings either at home, at school, or with the support of local officials. In Kumaun, the two celebrations during Navrati—first during Chaitra Navrati in the month of Chaitra and second during Sharad Navratri in the month of Ashwin—are also considered to be connected to Harela. This is followed by Bhaitauli, or Bhitauli, wherein gifts are given to girls of the family.

The Shravan Harela is celebrated as the first day (Kark Sankranti) of the Hindu calendar month of Shravan (late July). Ten days before the due date, 5 or 7 types of seeds are sown in buckets by the head of every family. Water is then sprinkled over them. After the due time, but before the actual celebration, a mock wedding is done by young ones. It is also marked by playing 'Gedi'. It is a game where small children mount on bamboo sticks and walk around farms. The harvested herbs (also called harela) are taken as God's blessings. Elders of the home put the harela on the heads of others, touching the harela from their heads to their feet. A blessing verse is also chanted while putting harela. This is the symbol for the rainy season and the new harvest.

People also eat the seeds of the new harvest after heating them. People meet their relatives and enjoy the festival. Some people also sow the seeds of new plants in the soil or fields and join their hands in the form of 'Pranam' for saving the environment. Harela symbolizes the new harvest of the rainy season every year.

== Traditions of the Harela Festival in Kumaun - ==
On the day of Harela, Pandit Ji does the Pranpratishtha of Harela in Devasthanam. Dishes are prepared for the Harela festival. It is necessary to make urad pakoras on any auspicious occasion or festival in the mountains. On the day of Harela festival, plants are planted with a vow to protect nature. Out of the cut greenery, two bundles or some parts are kept at the topmost point of the roof, which is called the axis.

After this it ascends to the family deities and all the temples in the village. Along with this, the elders in the house apply Harela to the younger ones with the best wishes of Harela. In the village or in kinship, newborn children are specially sent to the festival of Harela.Here in Shoka tribal rural areas, a symbolic marriage is also organized with a sprig of greenery (a special plant). In some areas of Almora, newly married couples take fruits and vegetables to the girl's maternal home, which is called the tradition of giving Og.

== Significance in Garhwal and Himachal-Pradesh ==
In Garhwal and Himachal, people take their village deity to an open place and sing and dance in front of the idol. Since deities mostly do not travel during monsoon, all the Dev-Dolis return to their Mool-Gram before the onset of monsoon, which is followed by some celebration. In Garhwal, there is a tradition of planting saplings/plants on this day [8][9], either by an individual, a family, or the community. It is usually celebrated on 16 July, as it is the beginning or the first day of Shravan Maas (rainy season)

== See also ==
- Harela mela
