= Sinja Valley =

Valley in Karnali Province, Nepal

Sinja सिञ्जा उपत्यका
- Valley
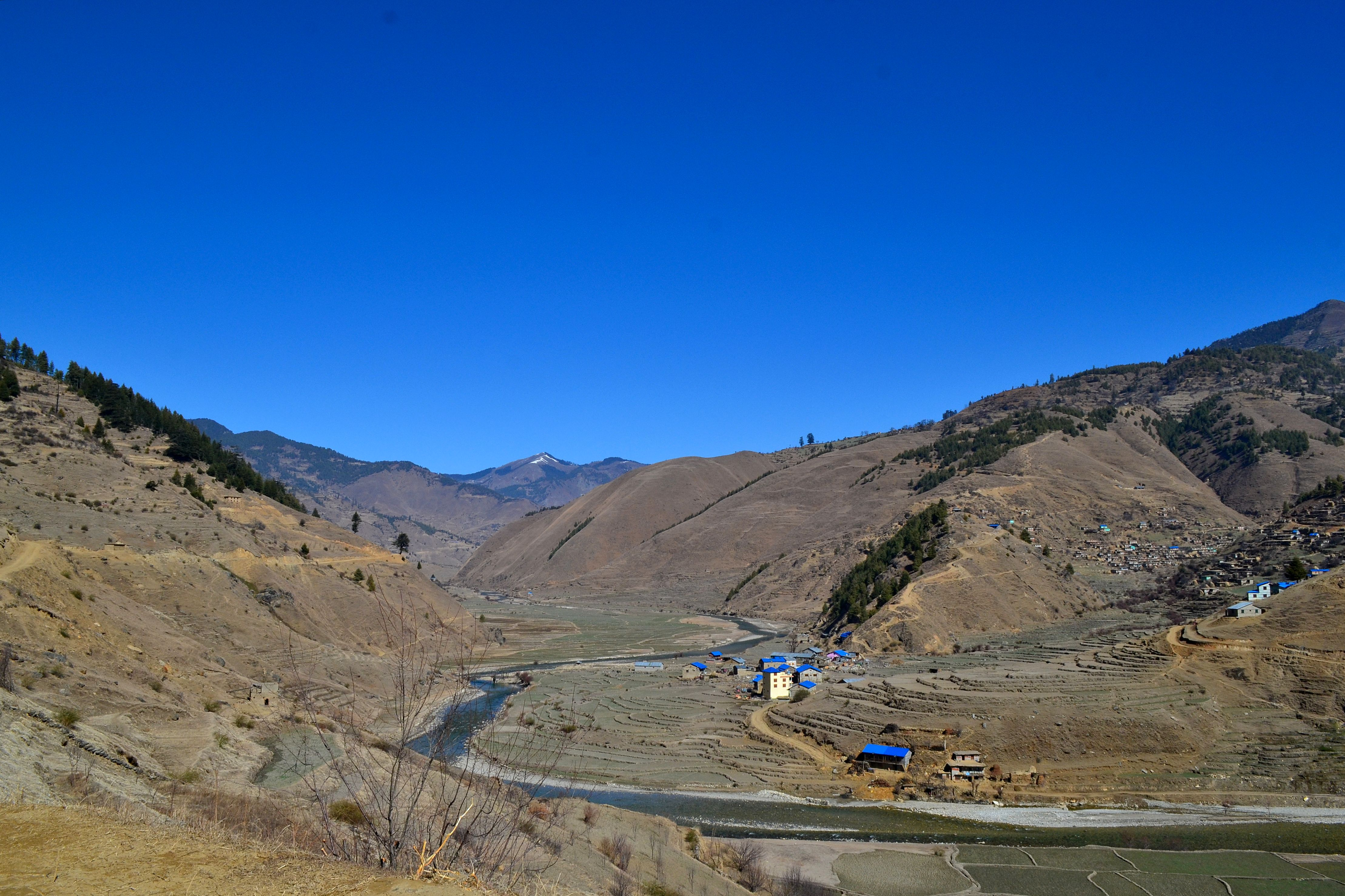
- Sinja County

- Location in Nepal Sinja (Nepal)
- Coordinates: 29.398°N 81.996°E
- Country: Nepal
- Province: Karnali Provinces
- District: Jumla District
- Time zone: UTC+5:45 (Nepal Time)

The Sinja Valley is located in the Jumla District in Karnali Province, of Nepal. The valley was the ancient capital city of the Khasa Kingdom and is considered a historically significant place. The valley is also considered as the birthplace of Nepali language.

== Site description ==
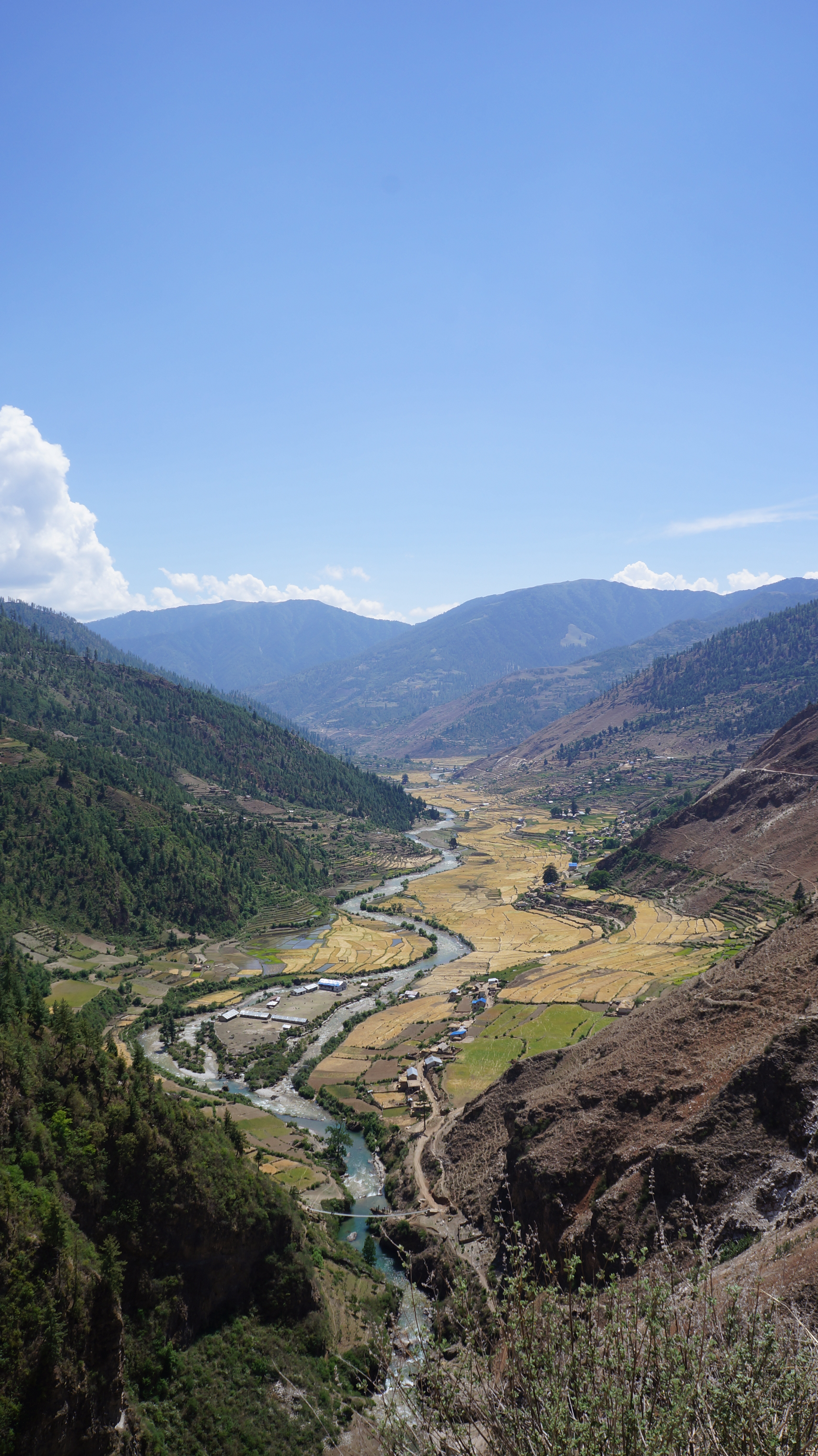
A view of Sinja Valley on the way to Mugu

The valley houses the ancient capital city of the Khasas that ruled this area from the 12th to the 14th century. Palaces, temples, and the ancient remains of a settlement were uncovered during excavations spearheaded by the Department of Archaeology at Cambridge University. Major finds from the site include a large network of underground pipes that formed a complex water delivery system as well as a ring of massive monolithic stone columns circumscribing the settlement.

On the cliffs at the valley edge were found some of the earliest written examples of Nepali language.

== History ==
The Khasa kingdom fragmented into 22 individual kingdoms after the 14th century, which then remained until Nepal was unified in the 18th century. The founder of the Khasa kingdom of Sinja Valley was Nagraj.

Across from the Hima River there are caves with ancient votive Buddhist chaityas and cliff inscriptions. Even today the ancient rites of the Masto (Shamans) are practiced in many of the stone Dewals or temples.

The Sinja Valley was where the Nepali language originates from and the earliest examples of the Devanagari script from the 13th century were found on the cliffs and in nearby Dullu.

== World Heritage Status ==
This site was added to the UNESCO World Heritage Tentative List on January 30, 2008 in the Cultural category.
