= List of Monuments of National Importance in Uttarakhand =

This is a list of Monuments of National Importance as officially recognized by and available through the website of the Archaeological Survey of India in the Indian state Uttarakhand. The monument identifier is a combination of the abbreviation of the subdivision of the list (state, ASI circle) and the numbering as published on the website of the ASI. 44 Monuments of National Importance have been recognized by the ASI in Uttarakhand.

== List of monuments of national importance ==
SL. No.	Description	Location	Address	District	Coordinates	Image
N-UT-1	Badrinath group of temples	Dwarahat		Almora	29°46′29″N 79°25′37″E	Badrinath group of temples More images
N-UT-2	Bandeo Temple	Dwarahat		Almora	29°46′25″N 79°25′38″E	Bandeo Temple More images
N-UT-3	Gujardeo Temple	Dwarahat		Almora	29°46′35″N 79°25′51″E	Gujardeo Temple More images
N-UT-4	Kacheri Group of Temples	Dwarahat		Almora	29°46′42″N 79°25′41″E	Kacheri Group of Temples More images
N-UT-5	Kutumbari Temple "lost" monument	Dwarahat		Almora		Upload Photo
N-UT-6	Maniyan Group of Temples	Dwarahat		Almora	29°46′40″N 79°25′37″E	Maniyan Group of Temples More images
N-UT-7	Mrityunjaya Group of Temples	Dwarahat		Almora	29°46′29″N 79°25′41″E	Mrityunjaya Group of Temples More images
N-UT-8	Ratandeo Shrines	Dwarahat		Almora	29°46′33″N 79°25′45″E	Ratandeo Shrines More images
N-UT-9	Surya Temple	Katarmal		Almora	29°37′57″N 79°36′53″E	Surya Temple More images
N-UT-10	Dandeshwar Temple	Jageshwar		Almora	29°37′45″N 79°50′29″E	Dandeshwar Temple More images
N-UT-11	Chandika Temple	Jageshwar		Almora	29°38′16″N 79°51′18″E	Chandika Temple
N-UT-12	Jageshwar Temple	Jageshwar		Almora	29°38′15″N 79°51′16″E	Jageshwar Temple More images
N-UT-13	Kuber Temple	Jageshwar		Almora	29°38′17″N 79°51′18″E	Kuber Temple More images
N-UT-14	Mrityunjaya Temple	Jageshwar		Almora	29°38′15″N 79°51′15″E	Mrityunjaya Temple More images
N-UT-15	Nanda Devi or Nau Durga Temple	Jageshwar		Almora	29°38′14″N 79°51′16″E	Nanda Devi or Nau Durga Temple More images
N-UT-16	Navgrah Shrine	Jageshwar		Almora	29°38′15″N 79°51′15″E	Upload Photo
N-UT-17	Pyramidal Shrines	Jageshwar		Almora	29°38′15″N 79°51′16″E	Pyramidal Shrines
N-UT-18	Surya Shrine	Jageshwar		Almora	29°38′15″N 79°51′14″E	Surya Shrine
N-UT-19	Sitoli Monuments	Sitoli		Almora		Upload Photo
N-UT-20	Grave of a European Soldier	Uprari		Almora		Upload Photo
N-UT-21	Baijnath Group of Temples: Ancient temples consisting of main shrine of Shiva and seventeen subsidiary shrines	Baijnath		Bageshwar	29°54′26″N 79°36′54″E	Baijnath Group of Temples: Ancient temples consisting of main shrine of Shiva and seventeen subsidiary shrines
N-UT-22	Three temples of the Indo-Aryan shikhara type known as Lakshmi Narayan Temple, Rakshas Deval Temple and Satya Narayan Temple	Tallihat		Bageshwar	29°54′24″N 79°36′39″E	Three temples of the Indo-Aryan shikhara type known as Lakshmi Narayan Temple, Rakshas Deval Temple and Satya Narayan Temple
N-UT-23	Remains of the sixteen Adi Badri Group of Temples	Adi Badri		Chamoli	30°09′22″N 79°13′35″E	Remains of the sixteen Adi Badri Group of Temples More images
N-UT-24	Chandpur Garhi Ruins: A Fort with walls and ruins of dwelling house inside with flights of steps	Chandpur Fort		Chamoli	30°10′32″N 79°12′50″E	Chandpur Garhi Ruins: A Fort with walls and ruins of dwelling house inside with flights of steps More images
N-UT-25	Trident of iron with a shaft with one ancient and three modern inscriptions	Gopeshwar		Chamoli	30°24′50″N 79°18′57″E	Trident of iron with a shaft with one ancient and three modern inscriptions More images
N-UT-26	Pandukeshwar Group of Temples	Pandukeshwar		Chamoli	30°37′59″N 79°32′59″E	Pandukeshwar Group of Temples More images
N-UT-27	Rudranath Temple	Rudranath		Chamoli	30°31′09″N 79°19′07″E	Rudranath Temple More images
N-UT-28	Rock inscription at the Survey Plot No. 89	Mandal, Uttarakhand		Chamoli		Upload Photo
N-UT-29	Baleshwar Group of Temples	Champawat		Champawat	29°20′12″N 80°05′25″E	Baleshwar Group of Temples More images
N-UT-30	Kotwali Chabutra	Champawat		Champawat	29°20′02″N 80°05′04″E	Upload Photo
N-UT-31	Naula or covered spring attached to the Baleshwar Group of Temples	Champawat		Champawat	29°20′11″N 80°05′25″E	Naula or covered spring attached to the Baleshwar Group of Temples More images
N-UT-32	Mahasu Devta Temple	Hanol		Dehradun	30°58′16″N 77°55′40″E	Mahasu Devta Temple More images
N-UT-33	Ancient site at Jagatram	Jagatram		Dehradun	30°29′49″N 77°49′36″E	Upload Photo
N-UT-34	The inscribed rock edicts of Ashoka	Kalsi		Dehradun	30°31′05″N 77°50′54″E	The inscribed rock edicts of Ashoka More images
N-UT-35	Kalinga Monuments	Karanpur		Dehradun	30°20′12″N 78°04′04″E	Kalinga Monuments More images
N-UT-36	Lakhamandal Group of Temples	Lakhamandal		Dehradun	30°43′53″N 78°04′03″E	Lakhamandal Group of Temples More images
N-UT-37	Old Cemetery of Roorkee	Roorkee		Haridwar	29°51′34″N 77°52′53″E	Old Cemetery of Roorkee More images
N-UT-38	Old Cemetery of Shaikhpuri and Ganeshpur	Shaikhpuri and Ganeshpur		Haridwar		Upload Photo
N-UT-39	Remains of ancient buildings locally identified with Vairatapattana	Dhikuli		Nainital		Upload Photo
N-UT-40	Sitavani Temple at the Jim Corbett National Park	Ramnagar		Nainital	29°24′28″N 79°13′21″E	Sitavani Temple at the Jim Corbett National Park More images
N-UT-41	Patal Bhuvaneshwar Caves	Patal Bhuvaneshwar		Pithoragarh	29°41′16″N 80°05′39″E	Patal Bhuvaneshwar Caves More images
N-UT-42	Remains of a few old temples and an inscribed masonry well at the Gangolihat Group of Temples	Gangolihat		Pithoragarh	29°39′23″N 80°02′33″E	Remains of a few old temples and an inscribed masonry well at the Gangolihat Group of Temples More images
N-UT-43	Excavated site at Dronsagar (only preliminary notification issued)	Kashipur		Udham Singh Nagar	29°12′22″N 78°58′36″E	Excavated site at Dronsagar (only preliminary notification issued) More images
N-UT-44	Excavated site and remains at Purola	Purola		Uttarkashi	30°53′04″N 78°05′34″E	Upload Photo

== See also ==
- List of State Protected Monuments in Uttarakhand
