= Katyuri dynasty =

Medieval Hindu kingdom of India and Nepal

Katyuri Dynasty Kurmanchal
- 700 CE–1065 CE
- Status: Sovereign state
- Capital: Joshimath later shifted to Baijnath, Uttarakhand
- Common languages: Sanskrit
- Religion: Hinduism, Buddhism
- Government: Monarchy
- Raja (King)
  - 700–849 CE: Vasu Dev
  - 850–870 CE: Basantana Dev (founder of Baijnath)
  - 870–880 CE: Kharpar Dev
  - 955–970 CE: Bhu Dev
  - brief period till 1065 CE: Bir Dev
- History
  - Established: 700 CE
  - Transfer of capital to Karttikeyapur, Baijnath: 850 CE
  - Disestablished: 1065 CE
Succeeded by
Doti
Chand kingdom
Garhwal Kingdom
- Today part of: India; Nepal

The Katyuri kingdom, also known as the Katyuri dynasty, was a medieval kingdom that ruled over the regions in Uttarakhand in India and western Nepal from either 500 to 1200 CE or 700 to 1200 CE. The founder of the dynasty, King Vasudev Katyuri, was originally a Buddhist ruler, but he later started following Hindu practices, sometimes attributed to a vigorous campaign of Hindu philosopher Adi Shankara (788–820 CE).

King Bhu Dev was known for extensively eradicating Buddhist practices in his kingdom and the Bageshwar stone inscription of Bhu Dev writes himself as "Brahmana Parayana" and "Parama Shramana Rupu", meaning a follower of Brahmans and an arch rival of Buddhist Bhikshus. The Katyuri Kings were known for constructing several Hindu temples in present-day Uttarakhand as they later followed Brahminical practices.

After fragmentation and disestablishment of the Katyuri kingdoms, their offshoots rose as Askot Katyuri Pal Rajwar in Pithoragarh, another Katyuri Pal Doti Rainka in modern Doti district of Nepal, King Brahm Deo's branch state in Sui, another Katyuri house at Baramandal, one of them maintained its sovereignty over Baijnath and finally one Katyuri house each in Dwarahat and Lakhanpur.

== History ==
=== Origin ===
The Katyuris claimed to be of Khasa descent. Historians believe Katyuris to be natives of Kumaon. For example E. T. Atkinson, in the first volume of his book Himalayan Gazetter, proposes the Katyuris to be natives of Kumaon, and traces their roots in the ruined town of Karvirpur on the bank of the Gomati river. However, historian Badri Datt Pandey proposed descent from the Shalivahana ruling house of Ayodhya (Note: Pandey states the Khasas to be the original inhabitants of these Himalayan areas, who settled here before the composition of the Vedas, and the Katyuris may have conquered them, and established their Kingdom.) while historian Price Powell claims their origin back to the Kunindas, having found coins from the Kuninda period. The rule of Kunindas were limited only to the foothill tracts and not in the interiors of Uttarakhand and the coins could have reached in the interiors by travel of traders and pilgrims.

It is also worth noting that the Pala emperors Dharmapala and Devapala mentioned Khasa Desha (country), under their administration and even the administration and arts of the Katyuris were very similar to the administration and arts of Pala Empire and also the kings of Chand dynasty regarded Katyuris with low importance which indicates that they were descendants of Khasas. Khasas managed the village level theocratic republics like gram-rajya and mandals under various local clans and identities. Katyuri was one of the ruling houses of Joshimath that claimed the sovereignty over other gram-rajyas of the entire territory. The Katyuris ruled from Joshimath in the Alaknanda Valley and later they shifted their capital to Baijnath.

=== Kingdom ===
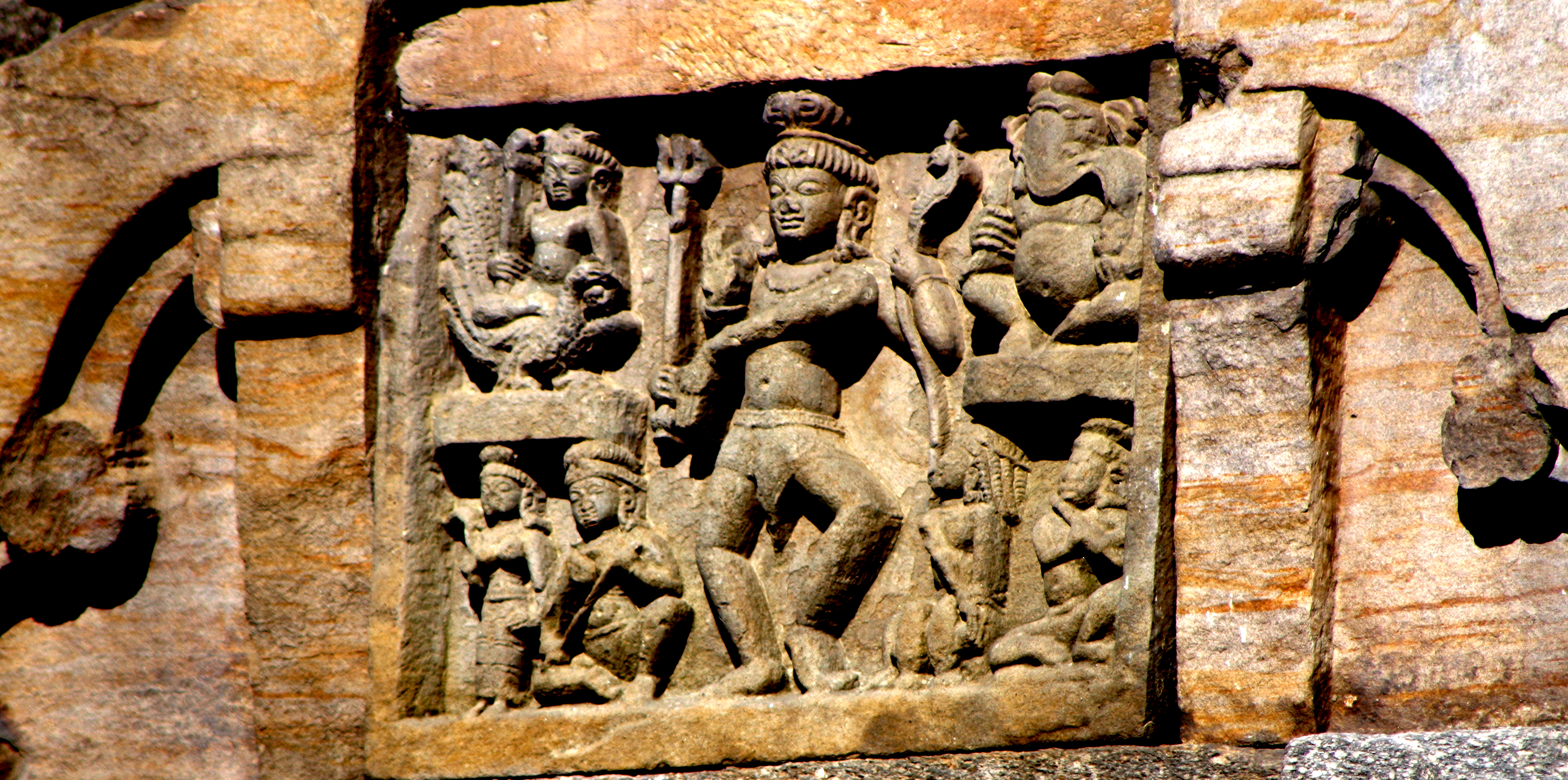
7th-century Nataraja relief on Temple 1 of Jageshwar Temples; Ganesha in upper right corner, Skanda-Kartikeya on his peacock in upper left, Parvati in lower left and a musician playing vadya in lower right.

The Katyuri dynasty was founded by Vashudev Katyuri (sometimes spelled Vasu Dev or Basu Dev); the ancient Basdeo temple in the city - the oldest stone temple in Uttarakhand - is attributed to him. His reign is most commonly believed to be from 850 to 870 CE. The Kingdom was then named Jyotiryana, and had its capital at Joshimath in the Alaknanda Valley. Vasu Dev was of Buddhist origin, but later started following Hindu practices. The Hindu practices of Katyuri kings in general is sometimes attributed to a vigorous campaign of Adi Shankara (788-820 CE).

They later shifted their capital to Baijnath from Joshimath. During their reign they dominated lands of varying extent from the "Katyur" (modern-day Baijnath) valley in Kumaon between the 7th and 11th centuries, and established their capital at Baijnath in Bageshwar district; which was then known as Kartikeyapura and lies in the centre of "Katyur" valley. Brahmadev mandi (a trading and business center in a flat area of the then Katyuri kingdom) in the Kanchanpur District of Nepal was established by Katyuris king Brahma Deo (Brahma Dev). Brahmadeo Mandi still exists by this name.

At its peak, the Katyuri dynasty of Kumaon extended from Sikkim in the east to Kabul, Afghanistan. They were known as Katoor around Chitral Gilgit Hindukush, in the west, before fragmenting into numerous principalities by the 12th century. it is believed that from king Dham Deo and Vir Deo the downfall of this powerful dynasty began. Virdeo used to collect heavy taxes and forced his people to work as his slaves, King Virdeo teased his subjects by his tyranny to the extent that he forcibly married his own maternal aunt Tila (Tilottama Devi). It is said that the Kumaoni folk song "Mami tile dharo bola" became popular from that very day. After the death of king Virdeo a civil war among his sons started. Fierce fight took place among them. Whole of the kingdom was ruined. The people of this very family divided the whole kingdom among themselves, they declared themselves independent kings and established their own kingdoms in various parts of Kumaon,

King Brahmdeo of this family (after whose name Brahmdeo Mandi was founded) established his kingdom in Sui. His first fort lay in Sui and the Rawat king of Dumkot was under him. The second branch started ruling Doti. The third established itself at Askot. Fourth settled down at Baramandal. The fifth maintained its sovereignty over Baijnath and . The sixth branch ruled in Dwarahat, later they were displaced by Chand kings.

=== Later offshoots ===
The Rajwar dynasty of Askot in Pithoragarh was set up in the 1279 AD, by a branch of the Katyuri Kings, headed by Abhay Pal Deo, who was the grandson of Katyuri king, Brahm Deo. The dynasty ruled the region until it became part of the British Raj through the Treaty of Sugauli in 1816. Doti, another branch of the Katyuri dynasty, came under Nepal through Gurkha expansion in 1790.

Later one more strong offshoot was Mahuli Mahson Raj, (Basti), Uttar Pradesh. The feudal kingdom stretched (47 kilometers) 14 kose. After Brahm Deo's reign the empire disintegrated, with his grandson Abhay Pal Deo continuing his reign from the kingdom of Askote in Kumaon's Pithoragarh district. Abhay Pal, Deo's two younger sons, Alakh Deo and Tilak Deo set out from Askote in 1305 with a large army and after passing through the Terai region and the plains of U.P, came to Gonda/Gorakhpur. This region was covered in thick jungles and swamps and was inhabited by fierce Bhar tribals. The Ghagra river in the south and Rapti river in the east protected the region from heavy attacks.

== List of rulers ==
The period of certain Katyuri rulers, is generally determined as below, although there is some ambiguity in respect to exact number of years ruled by each King:

List–

- Vasu Dev (700–849 CE) (Possibly legendary)
- Basantana Dev (850–870 CE)
- Kharpar Dev (870–880 CE)
- Abhiraj Dev (880–890 CE)
- Tribhuvanraj Dev (890–900 CE)
- Nimbarta Dev (900–915 CE)
- Istanga (915–930 CE)
- Lalitasura Dev (930–955 CE)
- Bhu Dev (955–970 CE)
- Salonaditya (970–985 CE)
- Ichchhata Dev (985–1000 CE)
- Deshat Dev (1000–1015 CE)
- Padmata Dev (1015–1045 CE)
- Subhiksharaja Dev (1045–1060 CE)
- Dham Dev (1060–1064 CE)
- Bir Dev (Very short period till 1065 CE)
- Trilok pal dev

== Legacy ==
=== Architecture ===
The Katyuri Kings were known for constructing several temples in present-day Uttarakhand and they followed Brahminical practices. Most of the ancient temples in Uttarakhand are architectural contributions by the Katyuri dynasty. Vasu Dev temple at Joshimath, several shelters and small shrines along the route to Badrinath, as well as the Lakulesha, Mahishasuramardhini, Navadurga and Nataraja temples at Jageshwar were constructed by Katyuri Kings. Bhuv Dev (955-970) was follower of Brahminical practices and built several temples at Baijnath and Bageshwar, but the structures are lost and tradition continues. A relatively rare Surya temple is located in Katarmal, now a remote village near Kosi, which was built by Katarmalla, a lesser known Katyuri ruler. The complex has 44 carved temples around the main temple, but is in a state of neglect after the theft of an important idol. The Katyuri Kings also build a temple known as Manila Devi near Sainamanur.

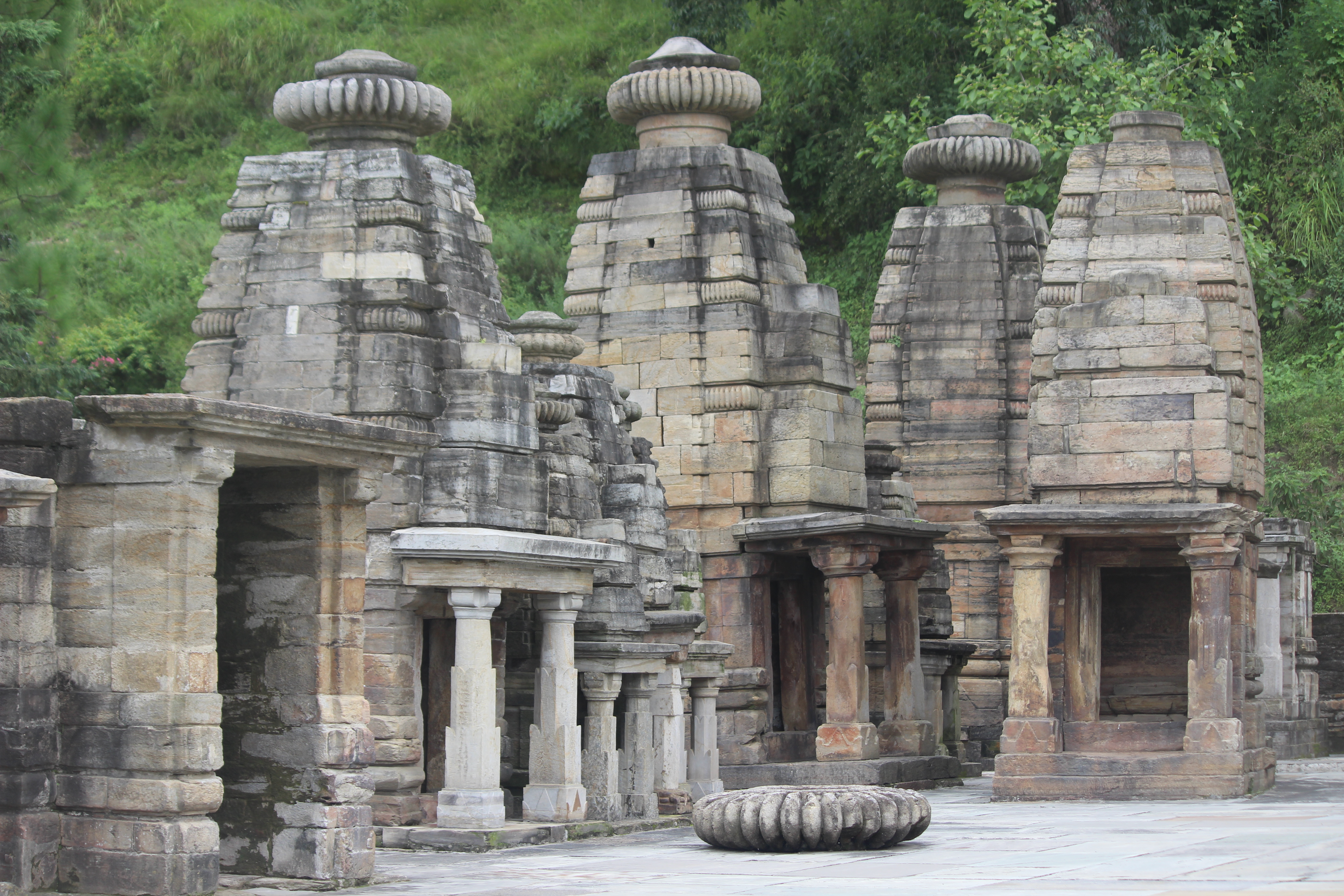
Sun Temple at Katarmal

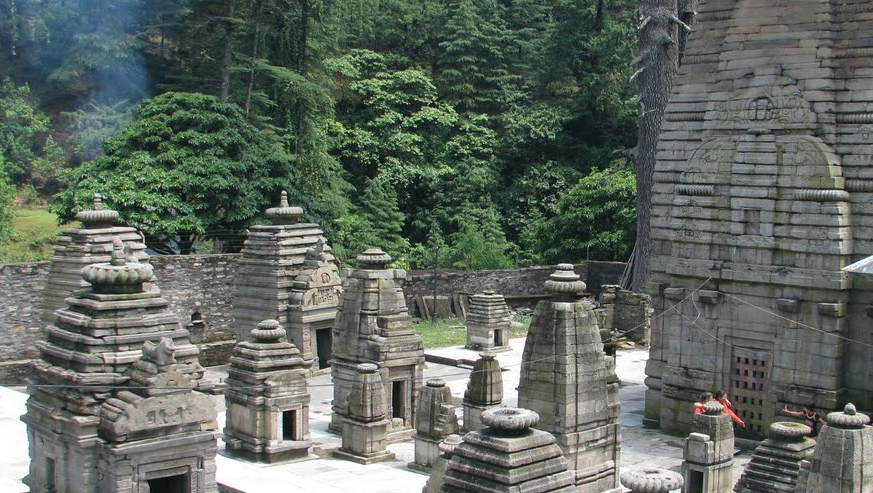
Jageshwar Temples Complex

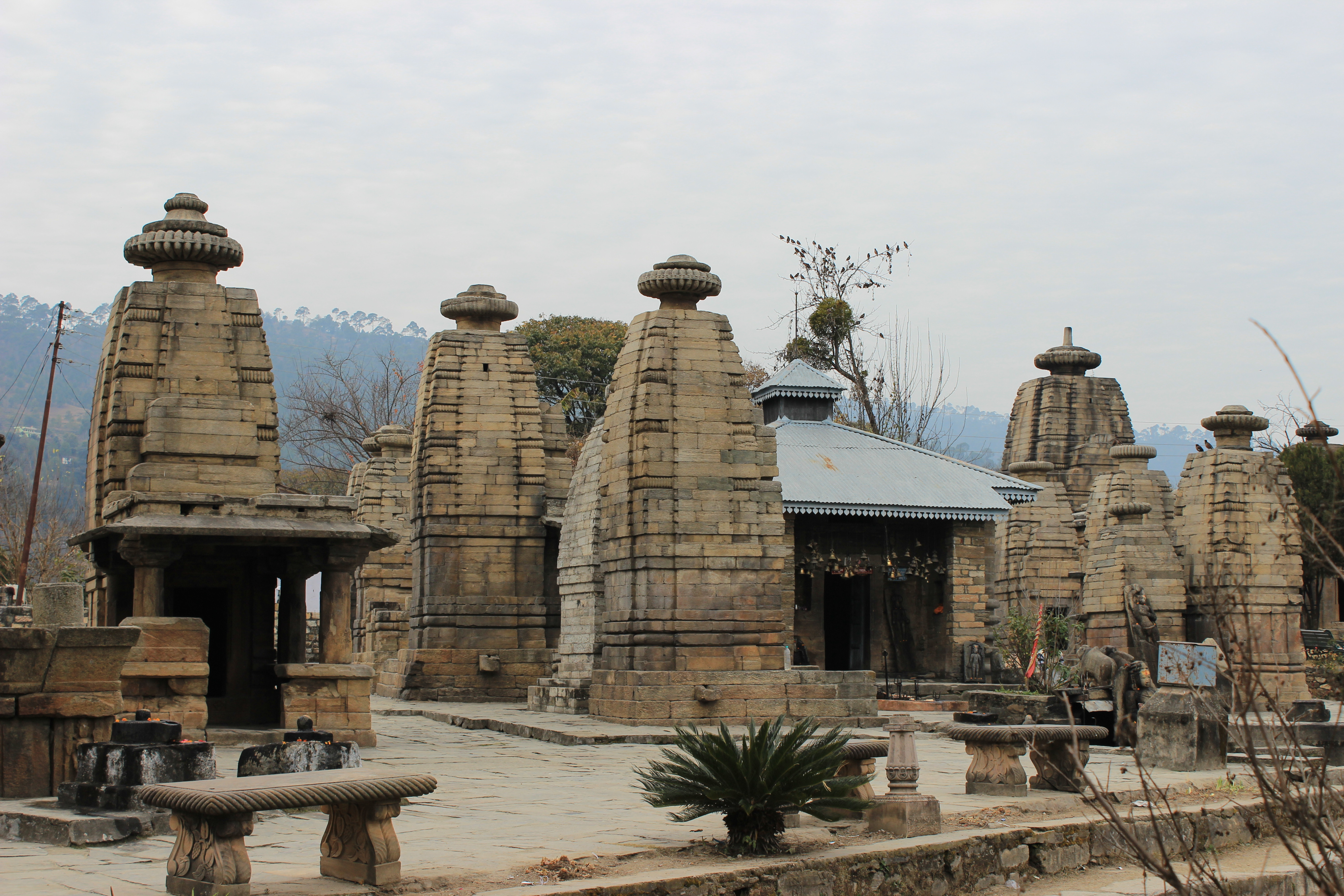
Baijnath Temple Complex

Several temples in Uttarakhand are attributed to the Katyuri Kings.

== See also ==
- Doti
- Bageshwar
- History of India
- Kumaon Kingdom
- Rajula and Malushahi
- Uttrakhand and Himachal Pradesh
- Khasdesha
