= Vasudev Katyuri =

Vasudev Katyuri (Kumaoni: वासुदेव कत्यूरी) was the founder and the emperor of the Katyuri dynasty, based east Himachal Pradesh, Kumaon, Garhwal, Doti (Note: The Katyuri dynasty, part of the Khasa lineage, ruled a vast region from Nepal to Kabul about 2,500 years ago. Originating in Uttarkoshal, they later formed a distinct kingdom in Kumaon. Known for their influence, they possibly ruled before or after the Khasa kings, with Kanakdeva being a notable ruler.) in the Indian subcontinent.

== Origin ==
Vasudev Katyuri, founder of the Katyuri dynasty, established his rule at Jyotirmath in the Alaknanda valley. he unified smaller Himalayan principalities into a single kingdom during the early medieval period.

== Ancient ==
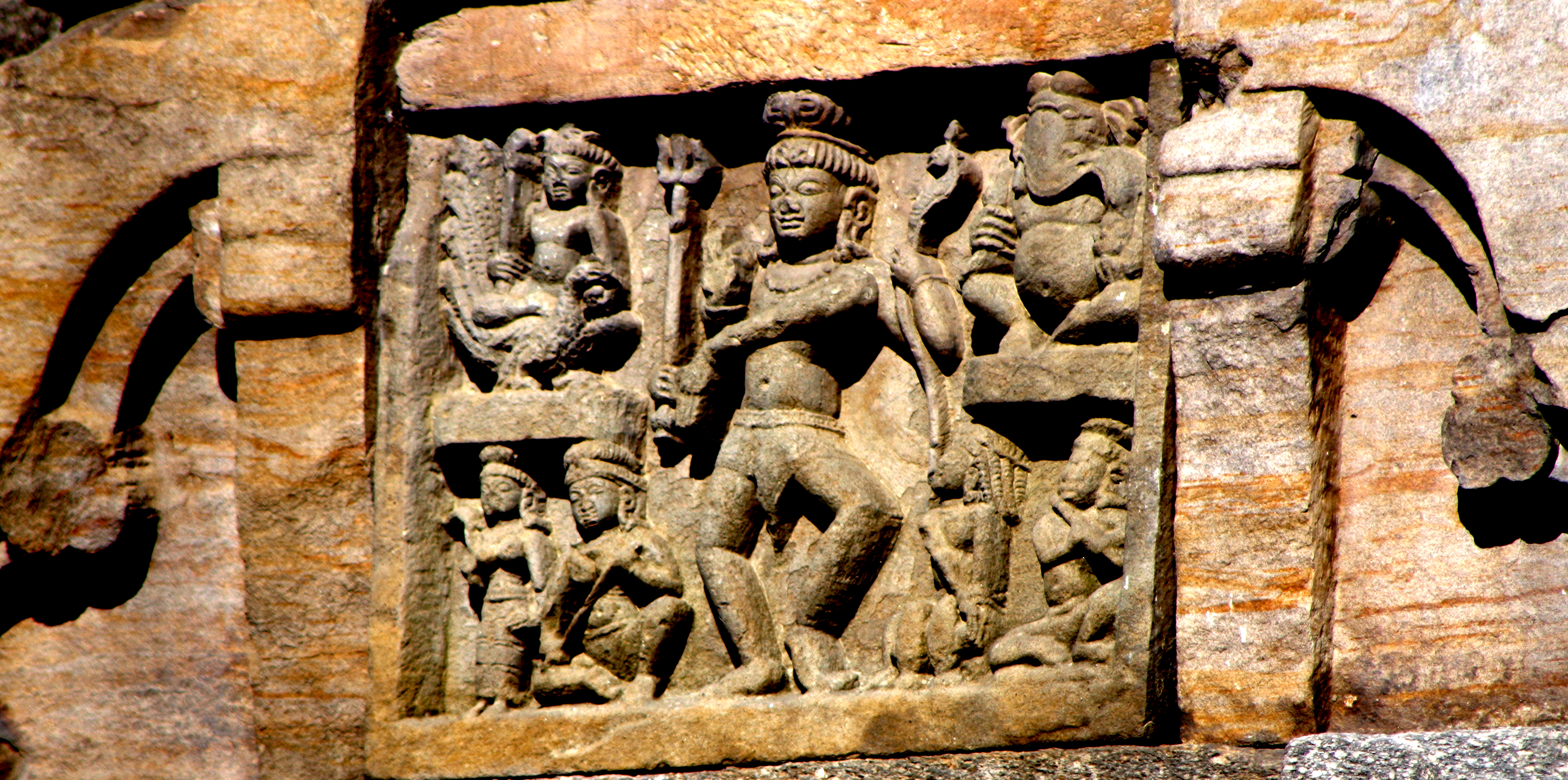
7th-century Nataraja relief on Temple 1 of Jageshwar Temples; Ganesha in upper right corner, Skanda-Kartikeya on his peacock in upper left, Parvati in lower left and a musician playing vadya in lower right.

The Katyuri dynasty was founded by Vashudev Katyuri (sometimes spelled Vasu Dev or Basu Dev); the ancient Basdeo temple in the city - the oldest stone temple in Uttarakhand - is attributed to him. His reign is most commonly believed to be from 850 to 870 CE. The Kingdom was then named Jyotiryana, and had its capital at Joshimath in the Alaknanda Valley.

== Regin and death ==
His reign is most commonly believed to be from 850 to 870 CE. The Kingdom was then named Jyotiryana, and had its capital at Joshimath in the Alaknanda Valley. Vasu Dev was of Buddhist origin, but later started following Hindu practices. The Hindu practices of Katyuri kings in general is sometimes attributed to a vigorous campaign of Adi Shankara (788-820 CE).

== Bibliography ==
- Nachiket Chanchani (2013). "The Jageshwar Valley, Where Death Is Conquered". Archives of Asian Art. 63 (2). Duke University Press: 133–154. doi:10.1353/aaa.2014.0004. S2CID 191618006.
