= Khasdesha =

Ancient Himalayan region associated with the Khasa people

Khaṣadeśa
खसदेशः

Regions with significant populations
- Uttarakhand, western Nepal, southern Tibet, Kashmir, Himachal Pradesh

Languages
- Kashmiri, Garhwali, Kumaoni, Nepali

Religion
- Indigenous traditions, Buddhism, Vedic/Hindu traditions

Related ethnic groups
- Indo-Aryan peoples, Khas people, Chhetri, Rajputs, Pahari people

Khaṣadeśa (Sanskrit:खसदेश), meaning "Land of the Khaṣas", was an ancient Himalayan region historically associated with the Khas people—an Indo-Aryan tribe of significant political and cultural presence in the western and central Himalayas. The region broadly covered parts of present-day Uttarakhand, western Nepal, southern Tibet, and some areas of Kashmir and Himachal Pradesh.

== Etymology ==
The name derives from the Sanskrit words Khaṣa (a tribal group) and deśa (meaning "land" or "country"). It denotes territories dominated or ruled by Khaṣa tribes, particularly during the early medieval period.

== Geography ==
Khaṣadeśa extended from Kashmir through Kullu, Garhwal, Kumaon, and western Nepal into parts of Tibet. According to linguist George Grierson, the Aryan-speaking population of this belt—especially in Garhwal, Kumaon, and western Nepal—is largely descended from the ancient Khaṣas.

== History ==
=== Early mentions ===
Khasadesh.—A country in ancient India. (Mahābhārata Droṇa Parva, Chapter 122, Stanza 41).

Khaṣas are mentioned in the Mahābhārata, Purāṇas, and other Sanskrit texts as warrior tribes living in the Himalayas. Though often referred to as mleccha, they were respected for their valor and independence.

📖 Śrīmad Bhāgavatam (Bhāgavata Purāṇa) Canto 2, Chapter 4, Verse 18 (Sanskrit: भागवतपुराणम् २.४.१८)

🔹 Verse (Devanagari + Roman Transliteration): किरातहूणान्ध्रपुलिन्दपुल्कशा आभीरशुम्भा यवना: खसादय: । येऽन्ये च पापा यदपाश्रयाश्रया: शुध्यन्ति तस्मै प्रभविष्णवे नम: ॥

Transliteration: kirāta-hūṇāndhra-pulinda-pulkaśā ābhīra-śumbhā yavanāḥ khasādayaḥ ye ’nye ca pāpā yad-apāśrayāśrayāḥ śudhyanti tasmai prabhaviṣṇave namaḥ

=== Medieval period ===
By the 4th century CE, the region became a tributary of the Gupta Empire. Later, during the 7th to 11th centuries CE, the Katyuri dynasty—believed to be of Khaṣa origin—established a powerful kingdom in this region with capitals at Joshimath and Baijnath.

== Culture ==
=== Religion ===
The Khaṣas initially practiced indigenous beliefs. During the early medieval period, many adopted Buddhism, likely influenced by nearby Tibetan and Indo-Nepalese traditions. Later, Hinduism became dominant, with increasing influence from Brahminical practices and Sanskritization.

=== Society and caste status ===
The Khaṣas were not originally integrated into the varna system. Over time, however, they were assimilated into Hindu society. In Nepal, they evolved into castes like Chhetri and Bahun, while in India, they became Rajputs, Kanets, and other upper-caste groups.

According to The East India Gazetteer (1815), people in Kumaon and Garhwal later distanced themselves from the Khaṣa label and claimed migration from the south to assert higher caste status.

== Language ==
The early Khaṣas spoke an archaic Indo-Aryan language which formed the basis of modern Western Pahari languages, including Kumaoni, Garhwali, and Nepali (Gorkhali). These languages reflect the ancient Indo-Aryan heritage of the region.

== Legacy ==
The cultural memory of Khaṣadeśa is preserved in the folk traditions, oral histories, and martial practices of modern Himalayan societies. Many contemporary communities in Nepal and northern India trace their ancestry to Khaṣa clans.

== See also ==
- Katyuri dynasty
- Kumaon Kingdom
- Garhwal Kingdom
- Khasa Malla Kingdom
- History of Uttarakhand
- History of Nepal
- Indo-Aryan migrations
