= Jageshwar =

Jageshwar जागेश्वर
- Location within India Location within Uttarakhand
- Coordinates: 29°38′N 79°51′E
- Elevation: 1,870 m (6,140 ft)

Population (20 11)
  - Total: 14,000

Languages
  - Official: Hindi
- Time zone: UTC+5:30 (IST)
- Telephone code: 05962
- Vehicle registration: UK-01
- Website: uk.gov.in

Jageshwar is a Hindu pilgrimage town near Almora in Almora district of the Himalayan Indian state of Uttarakhand. It is one of the Dhams (pilgrimage region) in the Shaivism tradition. The site is protected under Indian laws, and managed by the Archaeological Survey of India (ASI). It includes Dandeshwar Temple, Chandi-ka-Temple, Jageshwar Temple, Kuber Temple, Mritunjaya Temple, Nanda Devi or Nau Durga, Nava-grah temple, a Pyramidal shrine, and Surya Temple. The site celebrates the Jageshwar Monsoon Festival during the Hindu calendar month of Shravan (overlaps with July–August) and the annual Maha Shivratri Mela (Shivratri festival), which takes place in early spring.

Jageshwar Temples, also referred to as Jageswar Temples or Jageshwar Valley Temples, are a group of 125 ancient Hindu temples dated between 7th and 14th century, The valley has a number of temple clusters such as the Dandeshwar and Jageshwar sites. Some locations have attracted construction of new temples through the 20th-century. Together these clusters over the valley consist of over 200 structural temples built from cut stone. Many are small, while a few are substantial. They predominantly illustrate North Indian Nagara style of architecture with a few exceptions that show South and Central Indian style designs, many are dedicated to god Shiva, while others in immediate vicinity are dedicated to god Vishnu, Shakti goddesses and Surya traditions of Hinduism.

There are other Hindu temples in the Himalayan region that are called Jageshwar Temple such as one in Dalash, Himachal Pradesh.

== Location ==
Jageshwar is located 36 kilometres (22 mi) northeast of Almora, in the Kumaun region. The temples site is on the south of the road, across which is an eponymous village at an altitude of 1,870 m, in the Jataganga river valley near a Deodar forest (Cedrus deodara). The temple clusters begin starting from satellite road branching off east from the Artola village on the Almora–Pithoragarh highway, at the confluence (sangam) of two streams Nandini and Surabhi after they flow down the hills in the narrow valley. The site is about 3.5 kilometres (2.2 mi) long along the Jataganga rivulet, is a narrow forested valley of oaks, deodara, rhododendrons and pines. Around the valley is human habitation which provide services to the pilgrims and travelers visiting these temples or passing through to other sacred sites in the Uttarkhand region. The resident villages are Mokshadham, Dandeshwar, Jageshwar and Koteshwar.

Jageshwar is about 100 kilometres (62 mi) southeast of the historic Baijnath Temple and about 100 kilometres (62 mi) northeast from the resort town of Nainital. It is mentioned in Hindu texts dated prior to the 10th-century as a tirtha (pilgrimage) site. (Note: According to Dwadasa Jyotirlinga Stotra, Jageshwar is a sacred geography along with Somnath Gujarat, Mallikarjuna Jyotirlinga Andhra Pradesh, Mahakaleshwar Madhya Pradesh, Omkareshwar Madhya Pradesh, Baidyanath Temple Jharkhand, Bhimashankar Maharashtra, Ramanathaswamy Temple Tamil Nadu, Kashi Vishwanath Temple Uttar Pradesh, Trimbakeshwar Jyotirlinga Maharashtra, Kedareswar Uttarakhand and Grishneshwar-Ellora Caves Maharashtra. सौराष्ट्रे सोमनाथं च श्रीशैले मल्लिकार्जुनम् । उज्जयिन्यां महाकालमोकांरममलेश्वरम् । परल्यां वैद्यनाथं च डाकिन्यां भीमशंकरम् । सेतुबंधे तु रामेशं नागेशं दारूकावने ।। वाराणस्यां तु विश्वेशं त्रयंम्बकं गौतमीतटे । हिमालये तु केदारं घुश्मेशं च शिवालये । ऐतानि ज्योतिर्लिंगानि सायं प्रातः पठेन्नरः । सप्तजन्मकृतं पापं स्मरणेन विनश्यति ।।)

The nearest rail head is Kathgodam 125 km. Jageshwar has direct road links with Almora (35 km), Haldwani (131 km.), Pithoragarh (88 km) and Kathgodam. State transport, and private jeeps and taxis ply from these place for Jageshwar regularly.

== History ==
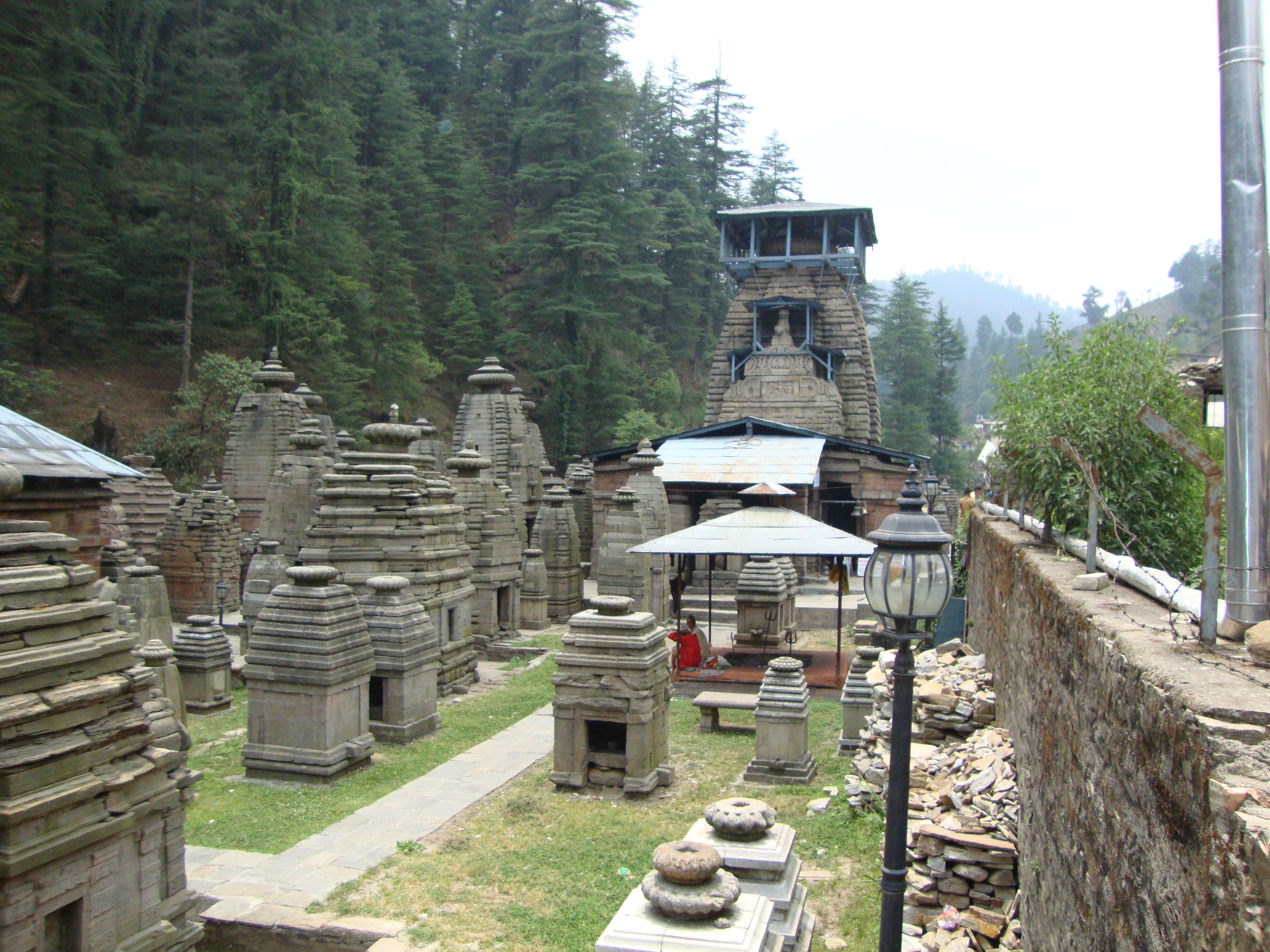
The temples at Jageshwar, believed to include the Nagesh Jyotirlinga.

The origins of the Jageshwar temples site are unclear. Its remote location has limited its studies and scholarly attention. The site shows evidence of different architectural styles and building periods for both temples and stone steles, which range from the 7th to the 12th century, and then in the modern times. Estimates for the same temple or stele varies widely, sometimes 1,400 years. According to the ASI, some belong to the post-Gupta or the second half of 1st millennium while others belong to the 2nd millennium. Some colonial-era guesses attribute them to the Katyuri or Chand hill dynasties but there is no textual or epigraphical evidence to support or refute these proposals. Another prevailing theory is that Adi Shankara built some of these temples, but once again there is no textual or epigraphical evidence to support this claim, however it now proved that these temples including the Lakulisha temple were patronized and maintained by Pashupata Shaivism ascetics. This is proved by the fact that the architectural features and style of some of these Hindu temples is from early 7th century, which is about 50 to 100 years before Adi Shankara lived (c. 788-820 CE).

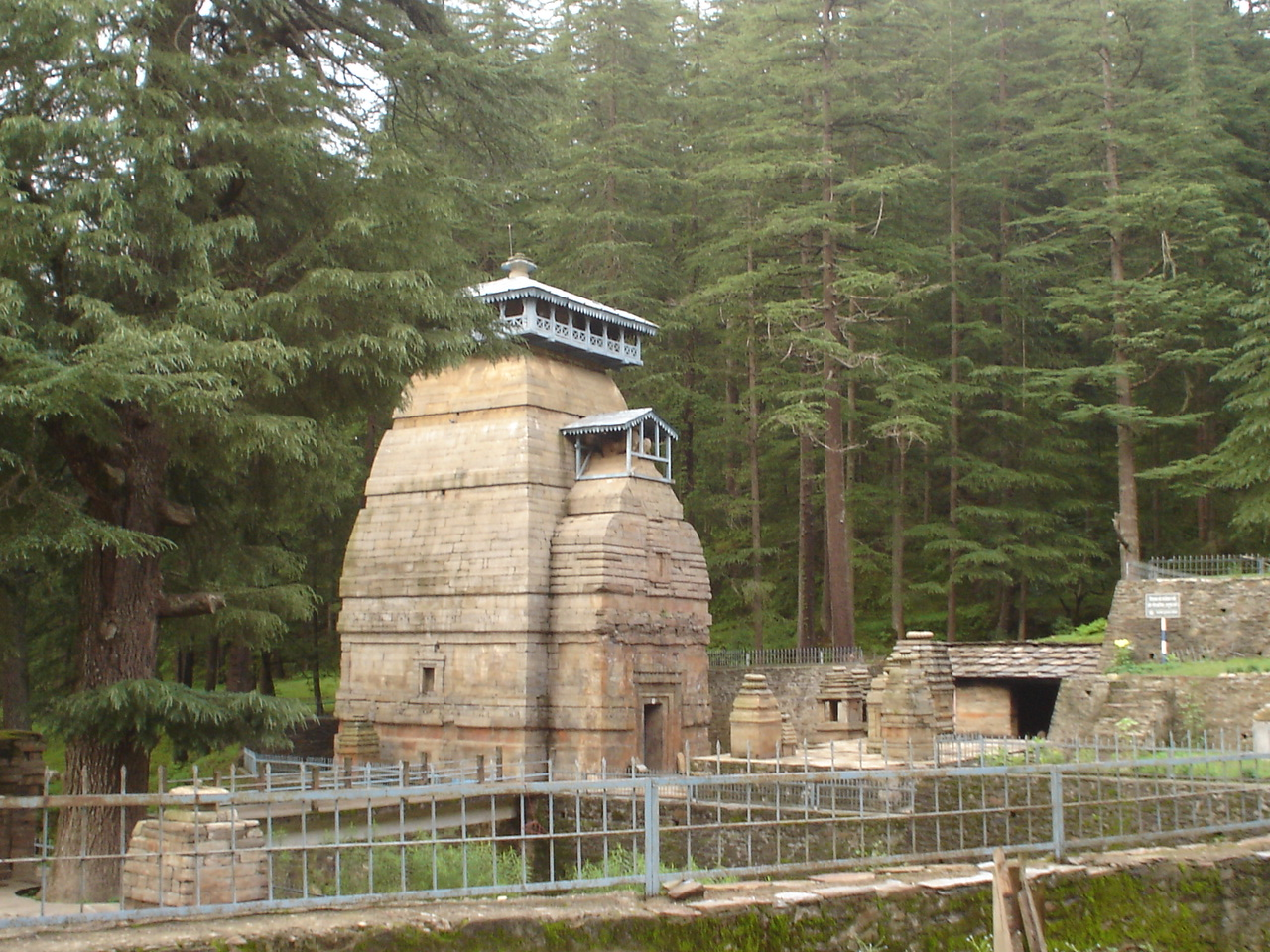
Dandeshwar Temple

The lack of systematic studies of Indian temples and ruins in many parts of the remote Himalayan regions limits what can be said about the chronological sequence of monuments in the Jageshwar valley. According to Chanchani, it is likely that the valley had reached a prominent position in Indian architecture by the 10th century, with the earliest monuments from the 7th-century.

The valley has two major clusters of Hindu temples and a number of roadside shrines. Of these some 151 temples have been numbered by ASI as protected pre-12th century monuments. The two largest groups are locally called as the Dandeshwar group temples (Dandeshwar samuh mandir, 15 temples) and the Jageshwar group temples (Jageshwar samuh mandir, 124 temples). Of these, temple number 37, 76 and 146 are the largest, all dated to the late centuries of the 1st millennium. In the historic text, Jageshwar is also referred to as Yageshvara.

Jageshwar was once the centre of Lakulish Shaivism, likely by monks and migrants who left the plains of the Indian subcontinent from places such as Gujarat and settled in the high mountains. The temple site, over time, was positioned as and grew as sacred geography in the form of northern (Uttara) Kashi (Varanasi).

== Jageshwar Temples ==
Jageshwar Temples
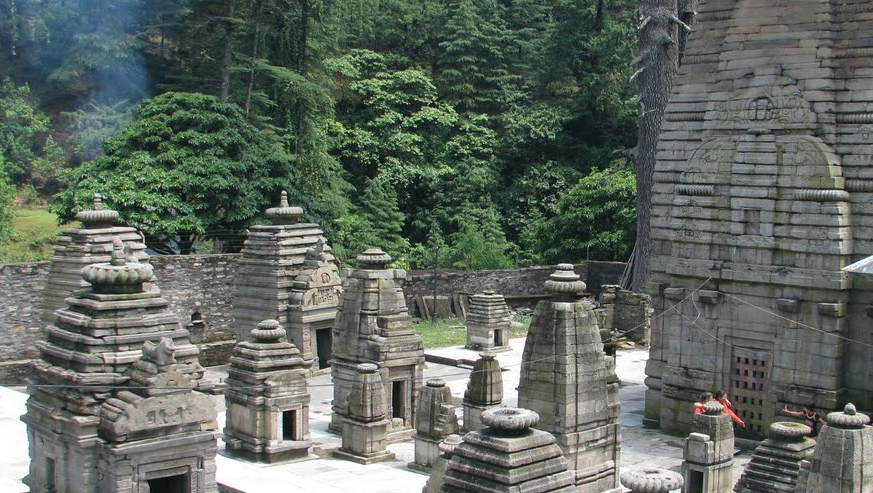
- Hindu temples of Jageshwar valley, near Almora town, Uttarakhand, India

- Location within India Location within Uttarakhand

Religion
- Affiliation: Hinduism
- District: Almora district
- Deity: Shiva, Vishnu, Devi, others

Location
- Location: Aartola, Jageshwar Valley, near Almora town, UK.
- State: Uttarakhand
- Country: India
- Coordinates: 29°38′14.3″N 79°51′16.9″E

Architecture
- Type: Nagara
- Completed: 7th to 14th century
- Elevation: 1,870 m (6,135 ft)

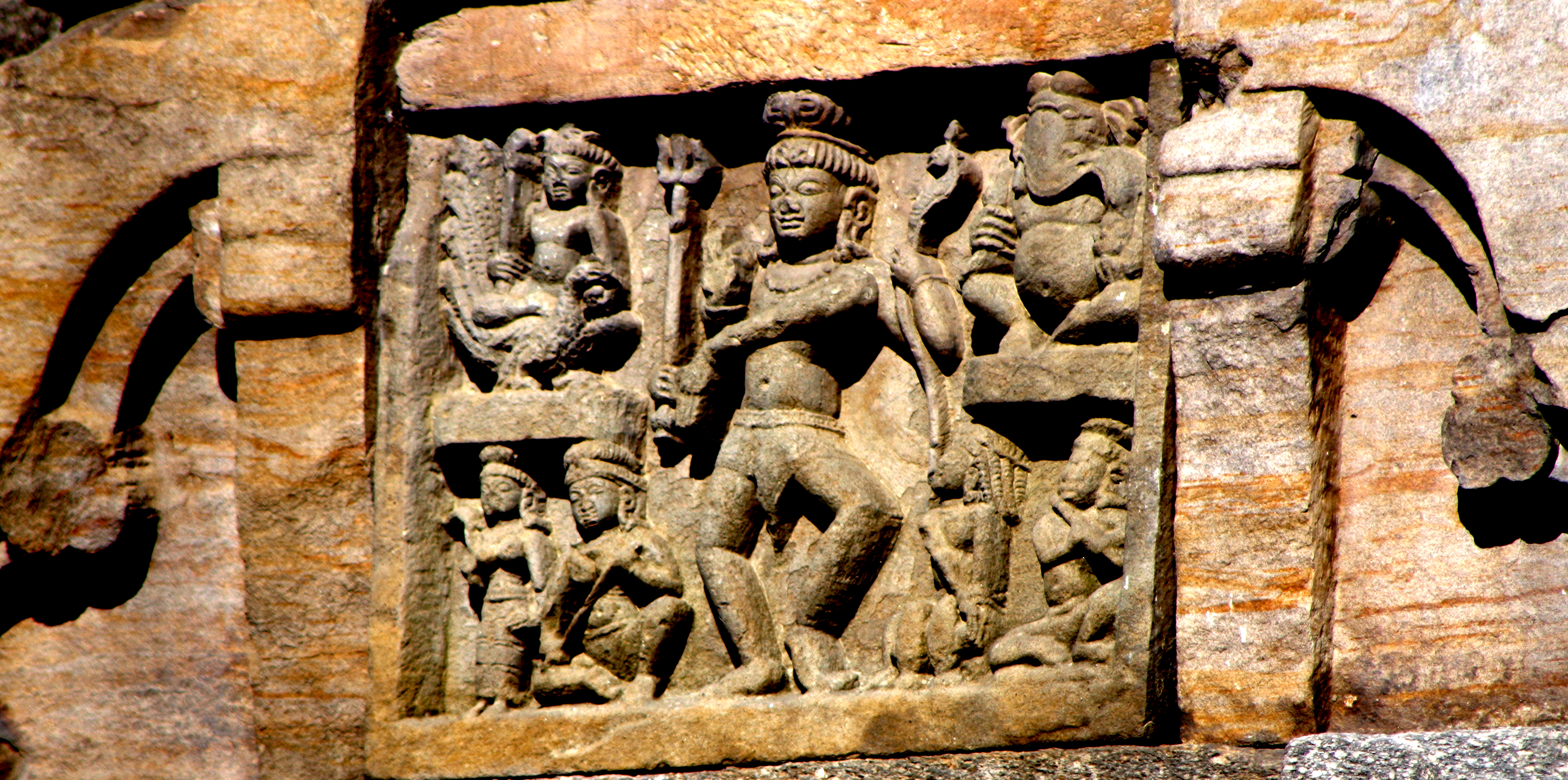
7th-century Nataraja relief on Temple 1; Ganesha in upper right corner, Skanda-Kartikeya on his peacock in upper left, Parvati in lower left and a musician playing vadya in lower right.

The Jageshwar group of temples are similar to some large historic cluster of Hindu temples found on the Indian subcontinent. For example, a similar cluster is seen near Bhubhaneswar, Odisha at the Lingaraja group of temples. Another large group of stone temples is illustrated at the Batesvar complex in Chambal valley of Madhya Pradesh. Almost all the small and large temples in the Jageshwar valley, states Chanchani, have a "simple square plan sanctums bounded by plain walls and tiered superstructures".

The temples are atypical than other Hindu temples build after the 6th-century. The Jageshwar temples have a design that deliberately does not anticipate their use as house of worship. The sanctum space in most temples is generally too small (~ 3 square feet) that a priest cannot sit inside, leave alone move around to complete a ritual. Further, most of the lingas do not provide for a drain from abhisheka, a feature that Hindu temples from Gupta and post-Gupta period include. There is no record of their being used for worship, nor traces at the site that would suggest unrecorded use. According to Chanchani, most of these temples may have been memorials to Hindu monks or saints, or part of dedication or grant to the monasteries.

The site is additionally notable for rock steles featuring Hindu theological themes. Included in these are all four major traditions of Hinduism: Shaivism, Vaishnavism, Shaktism and Sauraism. Example steles include those of Ksemankari, Narayana, Revanta and Surya. Other significant reliefs include those of dancing Ganesha, seated and smiling Uma-Parvati and Saptamatrikas.

Some significant monuments in the Jageshwar valley include:

- Temple 47, found at the Jageshwar site, is a Valabhi Nagara style superstructure with a wagon vault from the 7th or 8th century. Its western wall was capped with a Vinadhara Shiva stele (lute bearing Shiva legend, Shaivism), the northern wall with Ganesha stele (pan-Hindu), and the eastern wall with yoga performing Saptamatrikas (seven mothers, Shaktism tradition).
- Temple 2, found at the Jageshwar site, is another early temple with a tiered tower in the curvilinear latina Nagara style. Its square sanctum is preceded by a short vestibule (antarala). The platform and base moulding resembles Temple 47. The tower is capped with a cogged disc (amalaka) and above it is a hypethral linga. The walls of this temple feature niches, while above the sanctum doorway is a dormer windom with three-face Shiva carved into it. The temple also has a 7th or 8th century relief carving showing Lakulisa seated on lotus in water, in a yoga asana doing meditation where gods approach him from the skies and yogis surround him.
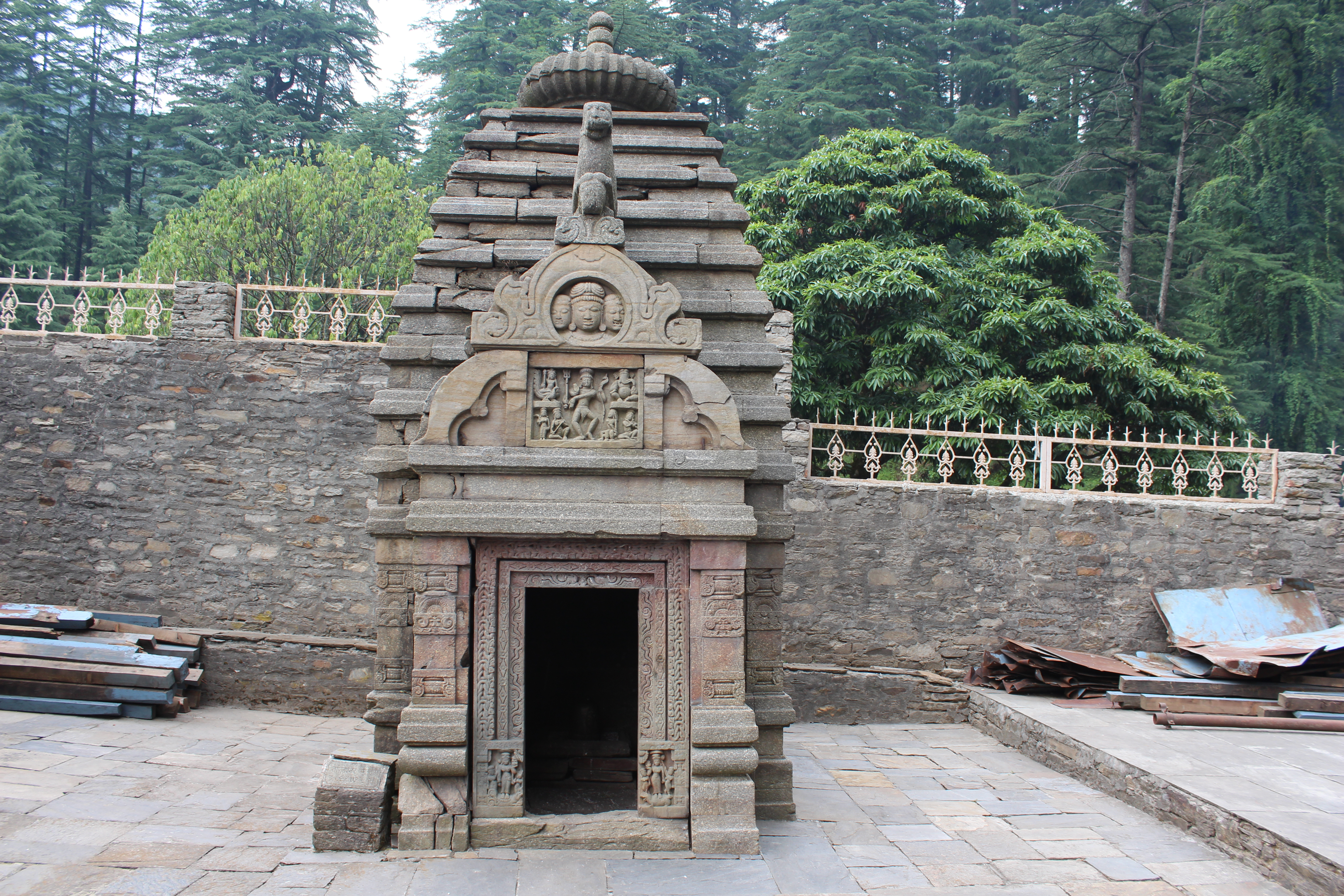
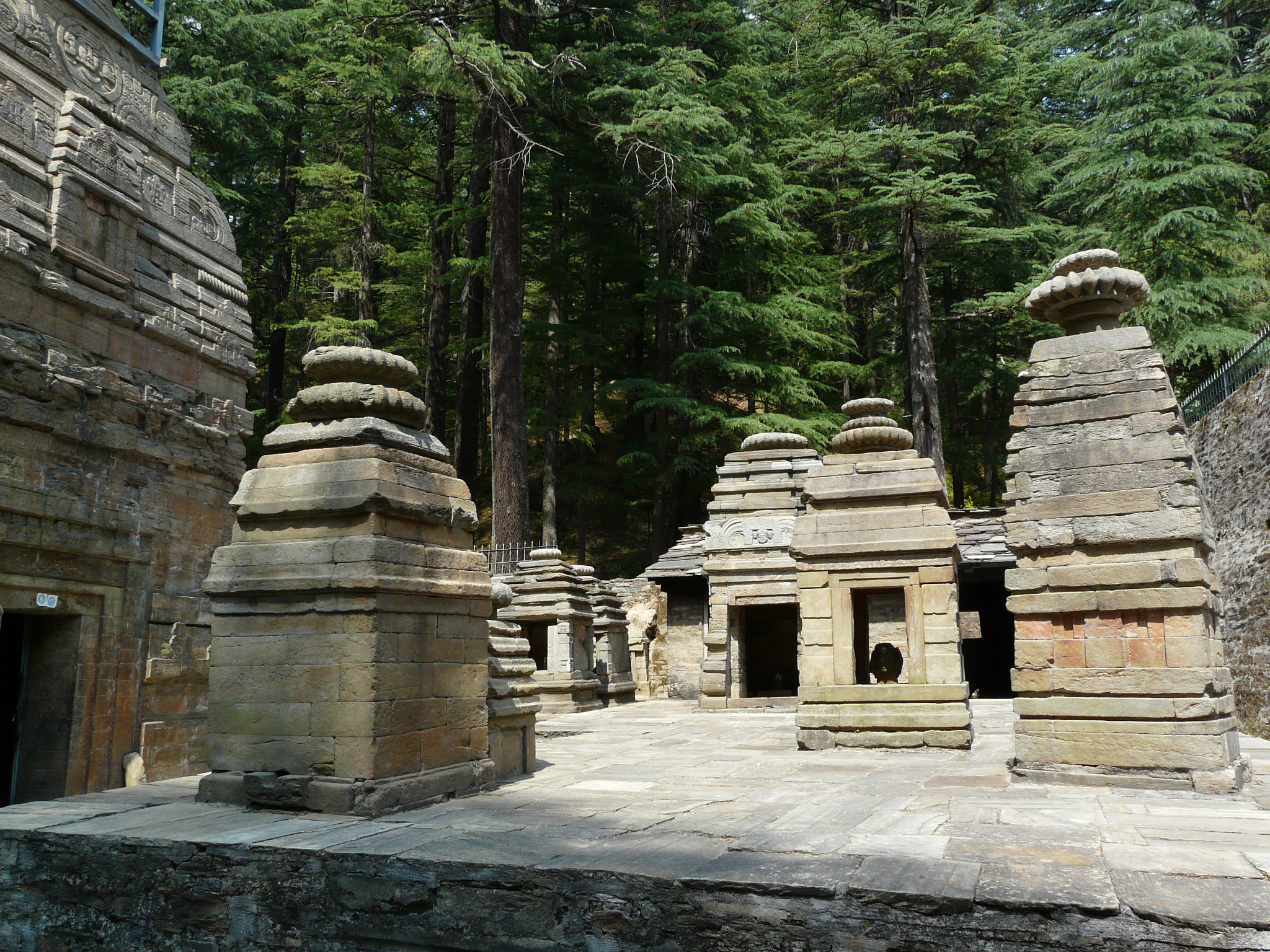
Two of the many styles of 7th-century Jageshwar (left) and Dandeshwar temples in the valley. The left has a closed sanctum, one amalaka disc on top and carved doorway. The mid-ground Dandeshwar temple is plain with open sanctum and three discs.
- Temple 145, found at the Dandeshwar site, is also a 7th to 8th-century temple but that exhibits yet a third distinct style suggesting an acceptance and proliferation of artist diversity. Its tower consists of stacked series of amalaka in the form of cogged discs of shrinking diameter. Below is the square sanctum (garbha griya) whose doorframe and mandapa are formed by square pillars. Inside the sanctum is a chaturmukha Shiva linga, each face looking at a cardinal direction.
- Temple 76, found at the Jageshwar site, is another 1st-millennium temple at the site, but one that is substantial. It is dedicated to Mrityunjaya form of Shiva, or the one who conquered death. The temple is in the middle of lingas and smaller shrines, suggesting its importance when they were built. Temple 76, also called the Mrityunjaya Mahadeva temple, is a large temple with the latina Nagara style architecture. It has a four-pillared entry mandapa, then the mukha-mandapa (main hall) which leads to an antarala (vestibule) then on to the square sanctum. The tower is curvilinear. Its wall is covered with frieze and niches in a format that belongs to the 850-950 CE. The temple tower is a multistorey structure, but in the modern era is covered with a wooden canopy. Inside the canopy is the original cogged disc-shaped amalaka which is then topped with hyperthral linga finial. The Mrityunjaya temple follows the vastupurusha-mandala plan and elevation found in Hindu temple architecture texts. It has 16 central squares like the Mahua Hindu temple, the sanctum length equals the central offset, and the wall thickness equals the corner unit's length, proportions taught in the symmetric 16-grid plan. The temple was the first that included a pillared hall (mandapa) in front, and this hall was used for communal rituals and as shelter for pilgrims to rest in. This temple is also notable for its short inscriptions found on its mouldings, walls, pilasters, and pillars. D.C. Sircar dated these to be from the 8th to 10th century period.
- Temple 37 is eponymously named as the Jageshwar temple. It is also large, has a mandapa, a vestibule, and a sanctum. However, it was likely built in 12th or maybe the 13th century, and the site evidence suggests it has been rebuilt a few times over its history. The temple integrated four entrances, included intricate carvings on its tower, and the superstructure is pyramidal with progressively receding stone blocks. The sanctum has two unusual dvarapalas added in the 14th-century or later. One four-armed dvarapala holds a skull in the tradition of the Pashupata-Kapalikas in one of his hands, a rosary in other, a fruit in yet another and the fourth hand cradles an object. At his pedestal is a bull, both on a lotus. The left dvarapala is similar, but differs in holding a serpent in his hand instead of the skull and other items. The symbolism of these dvarapala is to remind the pilgrim of the certainty of death for everyone and that when they pass through them they are entering the spiritual sanctum and the symbolism for liberation which exists eternally. Temple 37 remains an active house of Hindu worship.

=== Vinayak Kshetra ===
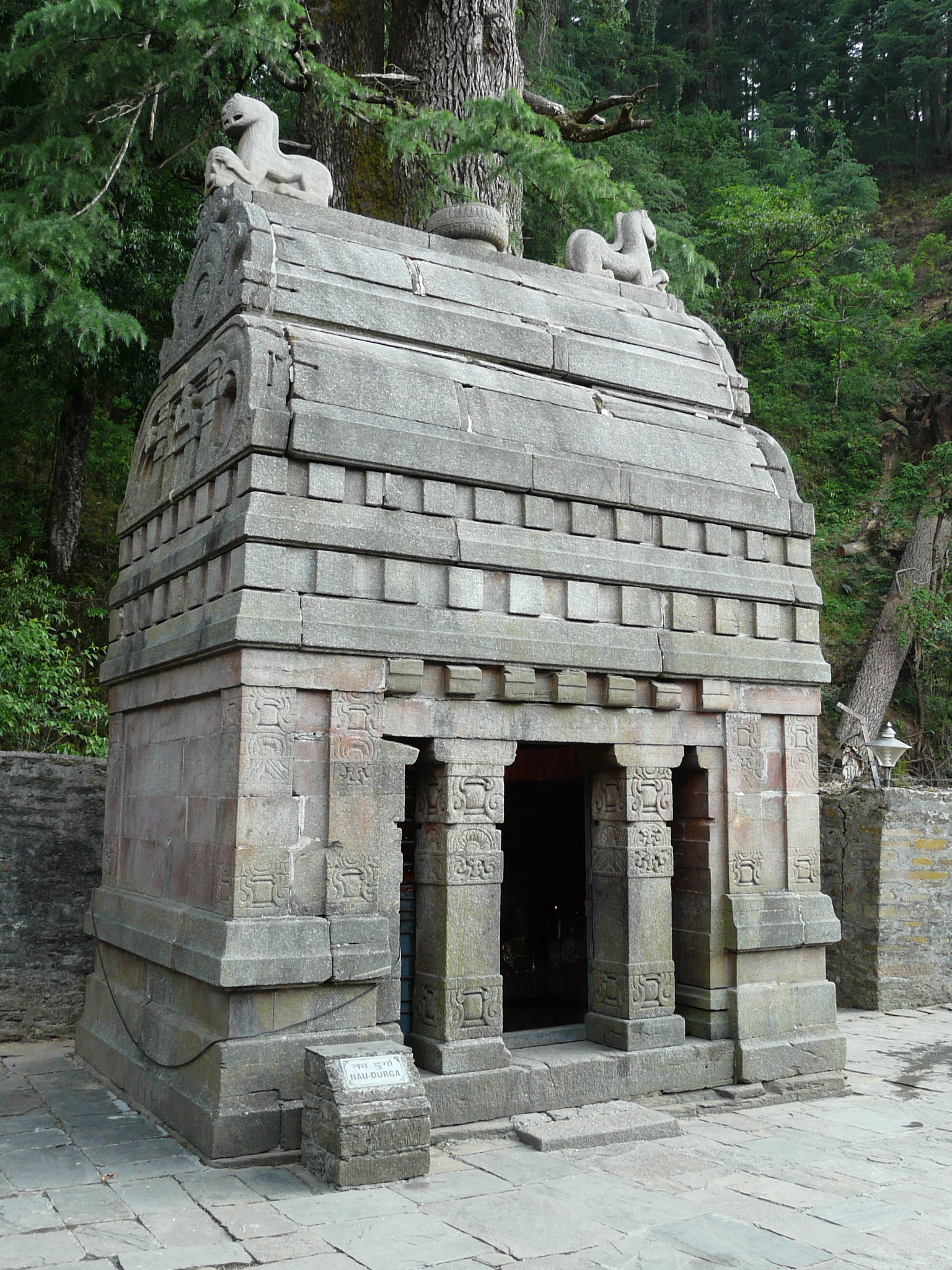
One of the Devi shrines with barrel-vault vimana

This place is 200 m from Artola village from where temples of Jageshwar starts. From this place Vinayak Kshetra or sacred area begins. This place lies between Jhanker Saim temple, Vrudhh Jageshwar and Koteshwar temples.

=== Sri Vriddha or Bud Jageshwar ===
This temple is situated Seven km north to Jageshwar. This temple is situated at the top of the hill and comes after an uphill trek. It is contemporary to Jageshwar group of temples. This temple is located at higher altitude

=== Pushti Devi or Pushti Bhagawati Maa ===
It is the temple of Goddess Devi. The temple enshrines the full murti of Goddesses. This temple is situated in the Jageshwar main premises.

=== Inscriptions ===
Over 25 inscriptions of different periods are inscribed on the walls and pillars of the Jageshwar temples. Most of these belong to the period between the 7th century AD to 10th century AD. The dialect of inscriptions is Sanskrit and Brahmi. These are studied by D.C. Sarkar in Epigraphica Indica.

== Significance ==
The Jageshwar temple site attracts a few hundred pilgrims and visitors every day. It remains a part of the Hindu sacred geography, particularly for the central Himalayan region. Many complete a part of the post-cremation last rites after the death of a loved one at the Jageshwar temple site. The temples are particularly popular in the late monsoon season. In other months, pilgrims typically combine their pilgrimage to Jageshwar Temples with those at Lake Mansarovar or Badrinath and Kedarnath, or other places in the Himalayas such as Gangotri. The site remains popular with Hindu monks and they continue to protect the site's sacrality.

== Related nearby monuments ==
The Archaeological Museum run by Archaeological Survey of India (ASI), houses more than 150 sculptures found in the Jageshwar valley. These date from 9th to 13th century AD. The display includes a statue of Uma-Maheshwar, Surya, Navagraha, panels narrating the legend of Vishapaharanamurti (Shiva drinking poison), Kevalamurti, and four armed Chamunda Devi.

- The river that flows through the town, Jata Ganga
- The River "Sam Ganga" that originates from Jhanker Saim temple and merges with River Jata Ganga Near Kot Linga Temple Ruins.
- A cave, Airavat Gufa
- Brahma Kund
- Other temples such as Sri Kuber Temple and the Batuk Bhairav Temple.
- The temple of Golu Devata at Chitai.
- Patal Bhuvaneshwar Caves

== See also ==
- Baijnath Temple Complex
- Katarmal
- Char Dham
- Mountain Temples and Temple Mountains
