= Baijnath, Uttarakhand =

Baijnath
- town
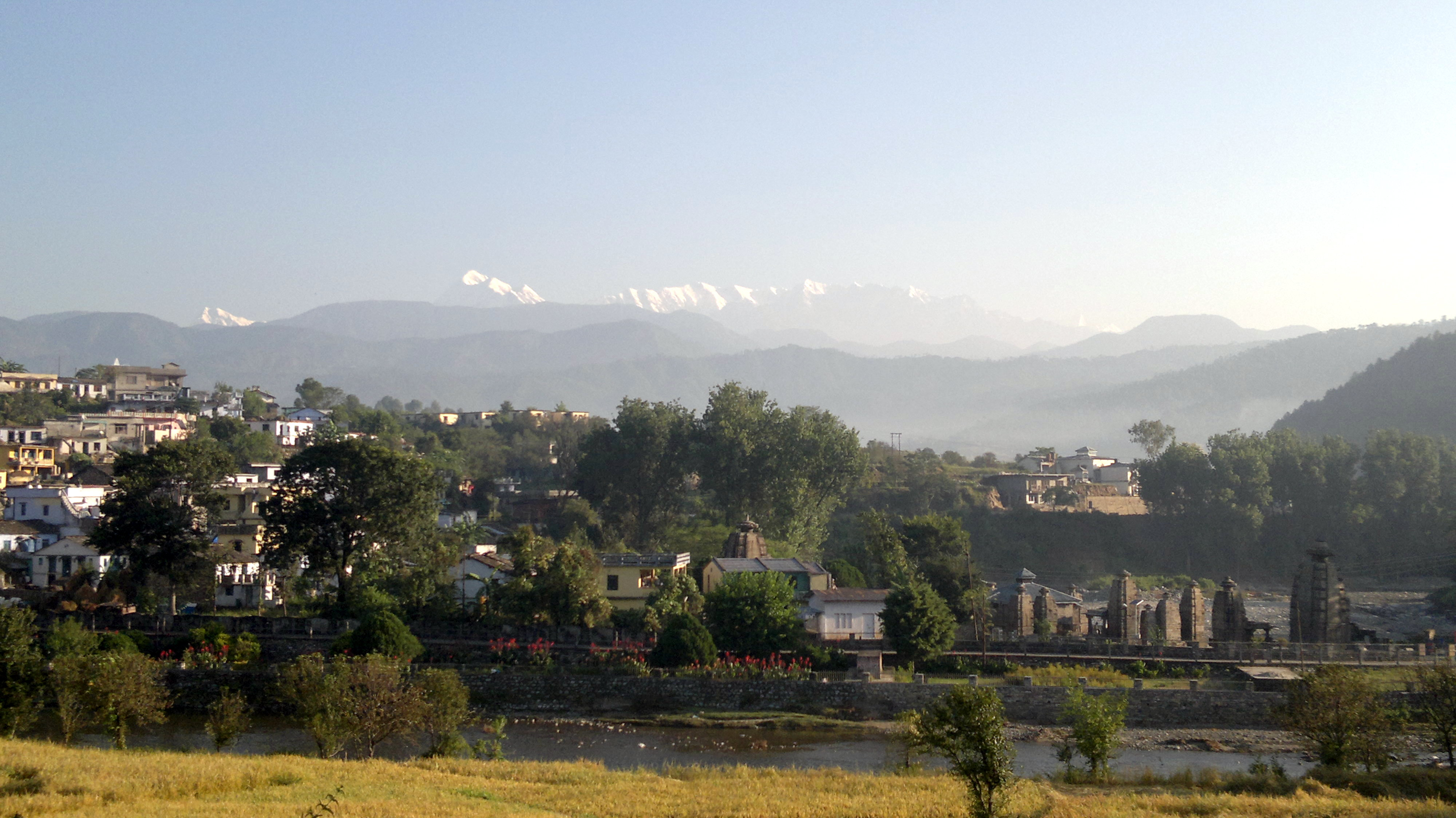
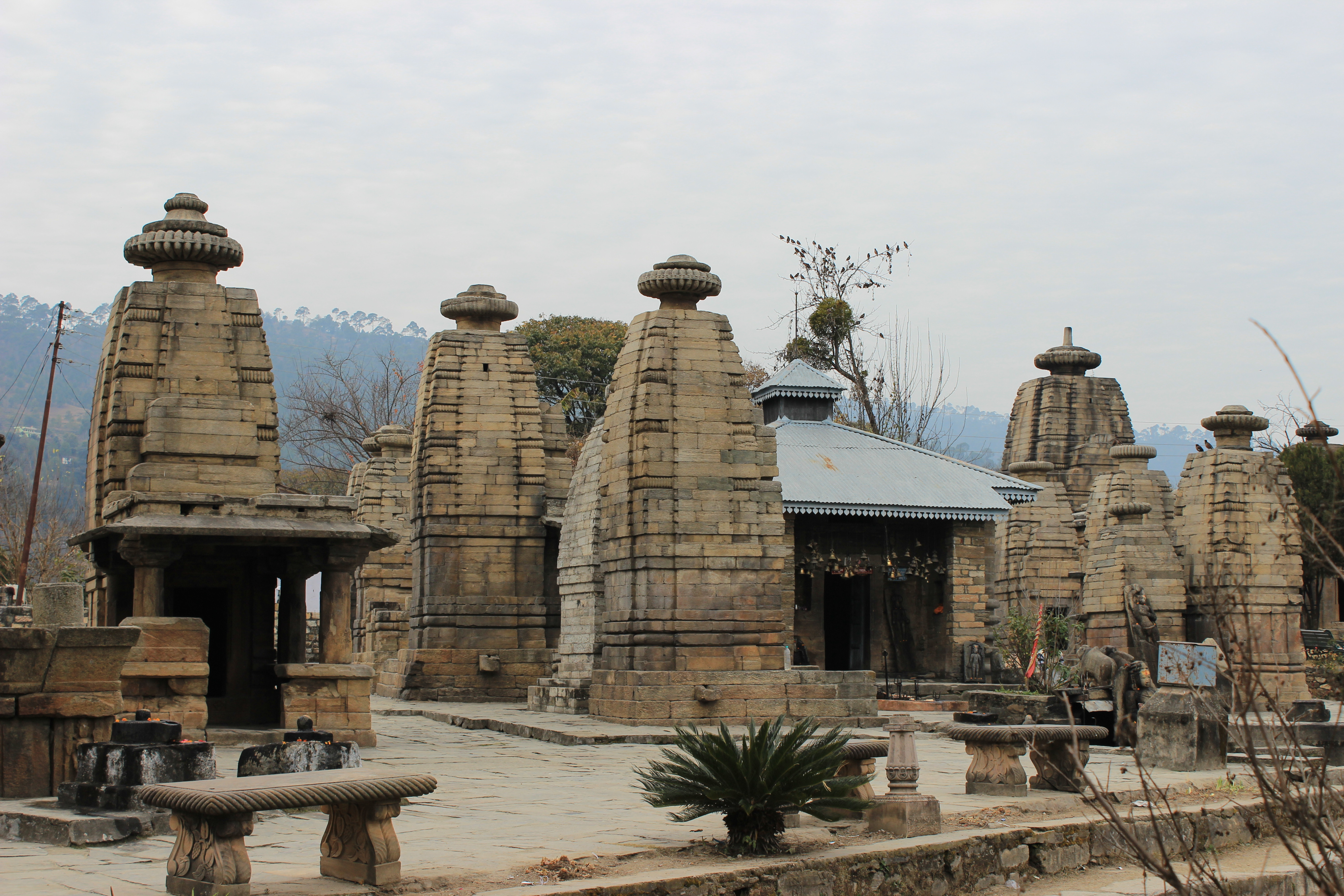
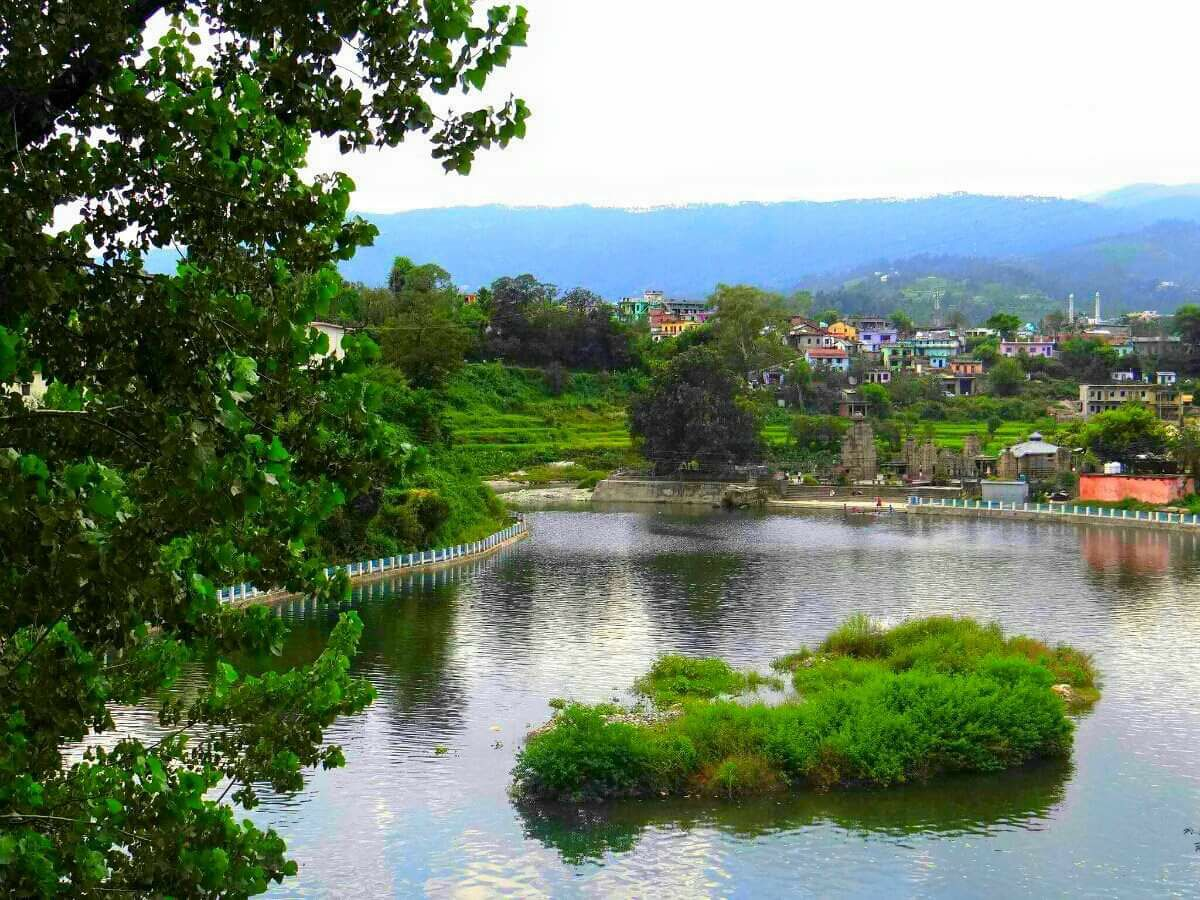
- top to bottom: Baijnath Skyline, Baijnath Group of Temples and Baijnath Lake

- Location in Uttarakhand, India Baijnath (India)
- Coordinates: 29.92°N 79.62°E
- Country: India
- State: Uttarakhand
- District: Bageshwar
- Established: 850 AD
- Founder: Narsingh Deo

Languages
  - Official: Hindi
- Time zone: UTC+5:30 (IST)
- Vehicle registration: UK 02
- Website: uk.gov.in

Baijnath is a small town on the banks of the Gomati River in the Bageshwar district in Kumaon division of Uttarakhand, India. The place is most noted for its ancient temples, which have been recognized as Monuments of National Importance by the Archaeological Survey of India in Uttarakhand. Baijnath has been selected as one of the four places to be connected by the Shiva Heritage Circuit in Kumaon, under the Swadesh Darshan Scheme of the Government of India.

Baijnath, then known as Kartikeyapura, was the seat of the Katyuri kings who ruled over an area consisting of combined parts of Garhwal and Kumaun in modern-day state of Uttarakhand, India and Doti in Modern day Nepal.

== History ==
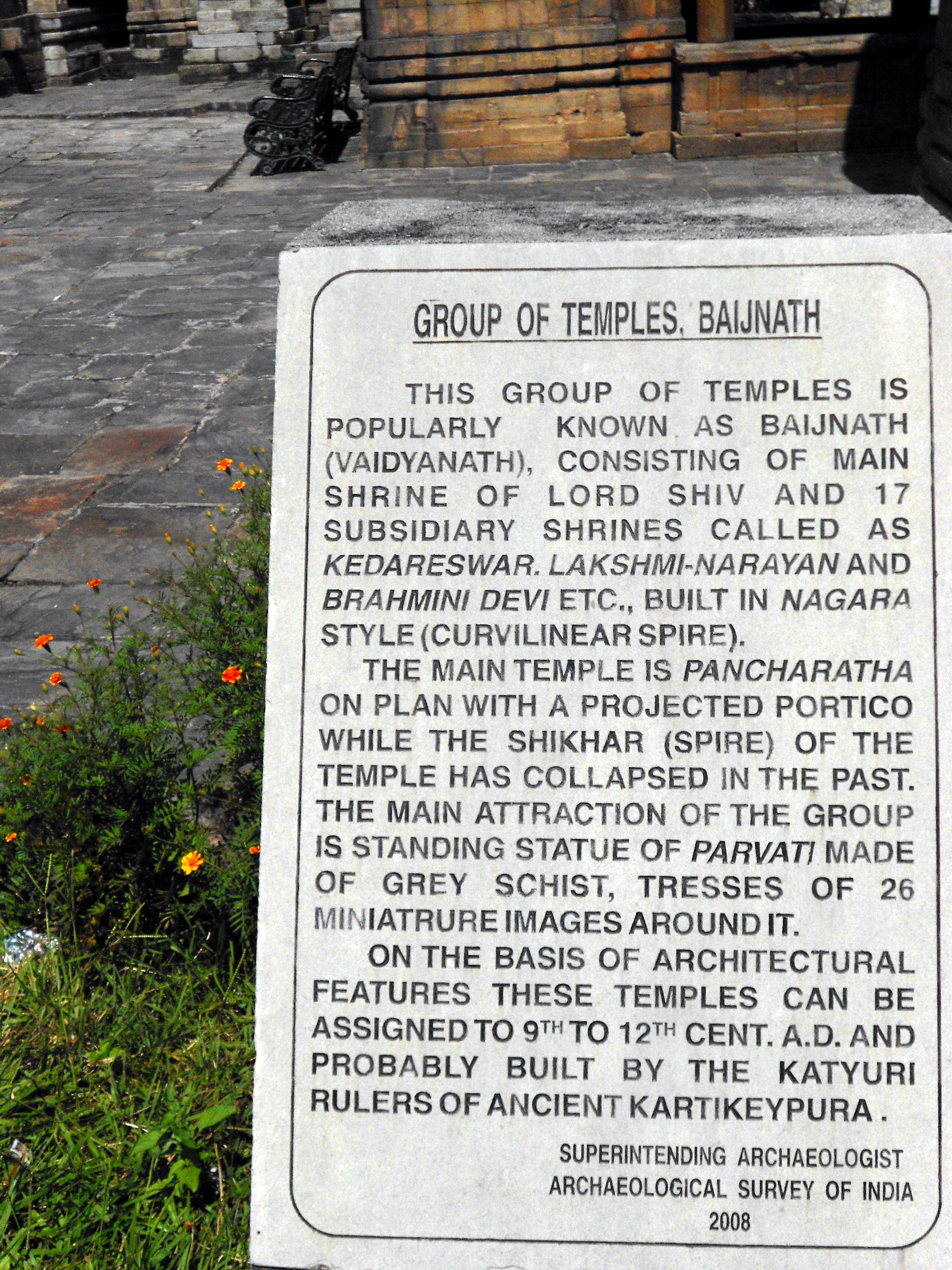
Descriptive Board at the Temple Site by Archaeological Survey of India. The board depicts the temples to be made between 9th and 12th Century AD by Katyuri Kings

The first permanent settlement of the area was a town named Karvirpur or Karbirpur. The ruins of this town were used by Katyuri king Asanti Deo to establish his capital in the area. According to the local legends king Asanti Deo left Joshimath because of a curse given by Narsingh, while according to geologists the main reason was several natural disasters such as landslides. Baijnath remained the capital of Katyuri Dynasty, who ruled the area from 7th-13th century AD., when it was known as Kartikeyapura. The Katyuri kingdom then consisted of combined parts of Garhwal and Kumaun in the modern-day states of Uttarakhand, India and Doti, Nepal.

After the death of Birdeo, the last king of the united Katyuri kingdom, the kingdom disintegrated in the 13th century giving rise to 8 different princely states. Baijnath remained under the rule of Baijnath Katyurs, descendants of Katyuri kings, till 1565 until king Balo Kalyan Chand of Almora annexed Baijnath to Kumaon.

The Gorkhas of Nepal while expanding their kingdom westwards across Kali River, invaded and overran Almora, the seat of the Kumaon Kingdom and other parts of Kumaon in 1791. In 1816, the Gorkhas were defeated by the East India Company in Anglo-Nepalese War in 1814 and were forced to cede Kumaon to the British as part of the Treaty of Sugauli.

It was a small village with a population of 148 in 1901 although it has grown somewhat since.

== Geography ==
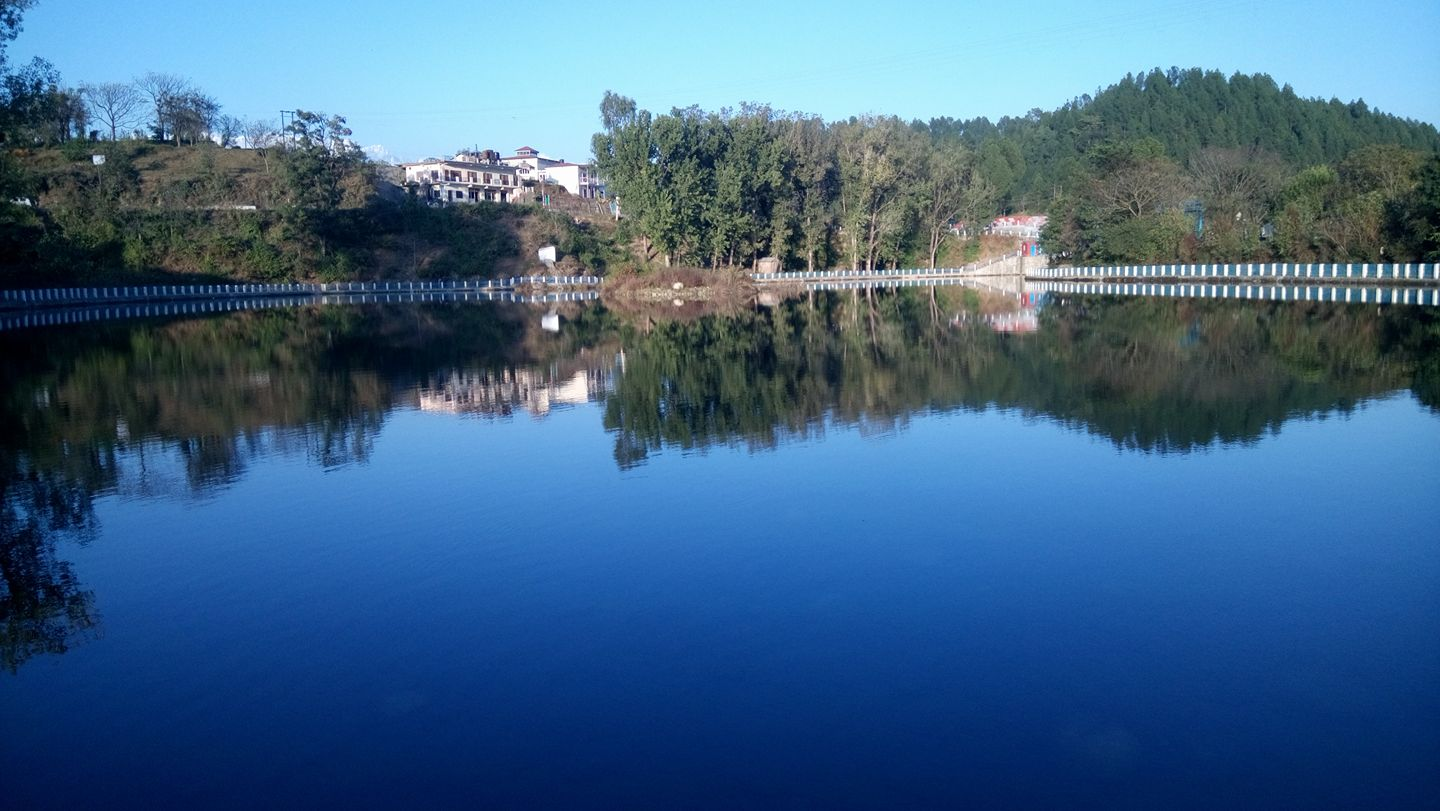
Baijnath Lake

Baijnath is located at 29.92°N 79.62°E, 20 km northwest of Bageshwar city, in Bageshwar district in Uttarakhand. It has an average elevation of 1,130 metres (3,707 feet). Baijnath is situated in the Katyur valley of the Kumaon Himalayas at the left bank of the Gomati river. Nearby villages include Dangoli, Gagrigol, Haat, Teet Bazar, Purara, and Noghar.

An artificial lake near the temple compound was announced in 2007–2008. It was completed and inaugurated on 14 January 2016 by Harish Rawat, the then Chief Minister of Uttarakhand.

== Heritage ==
The temple is significant to Hindus because of mythology concerning its location near a river.

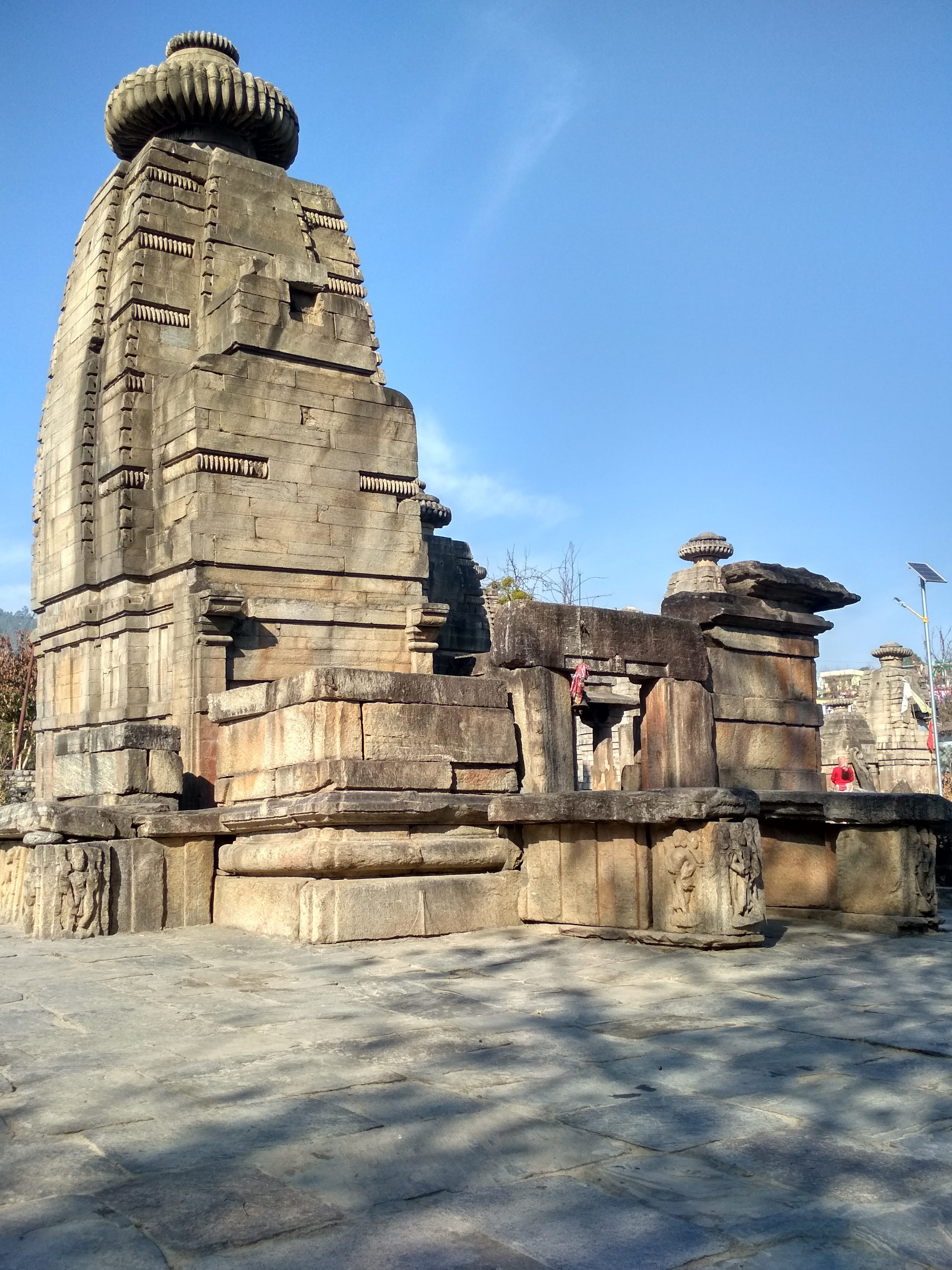

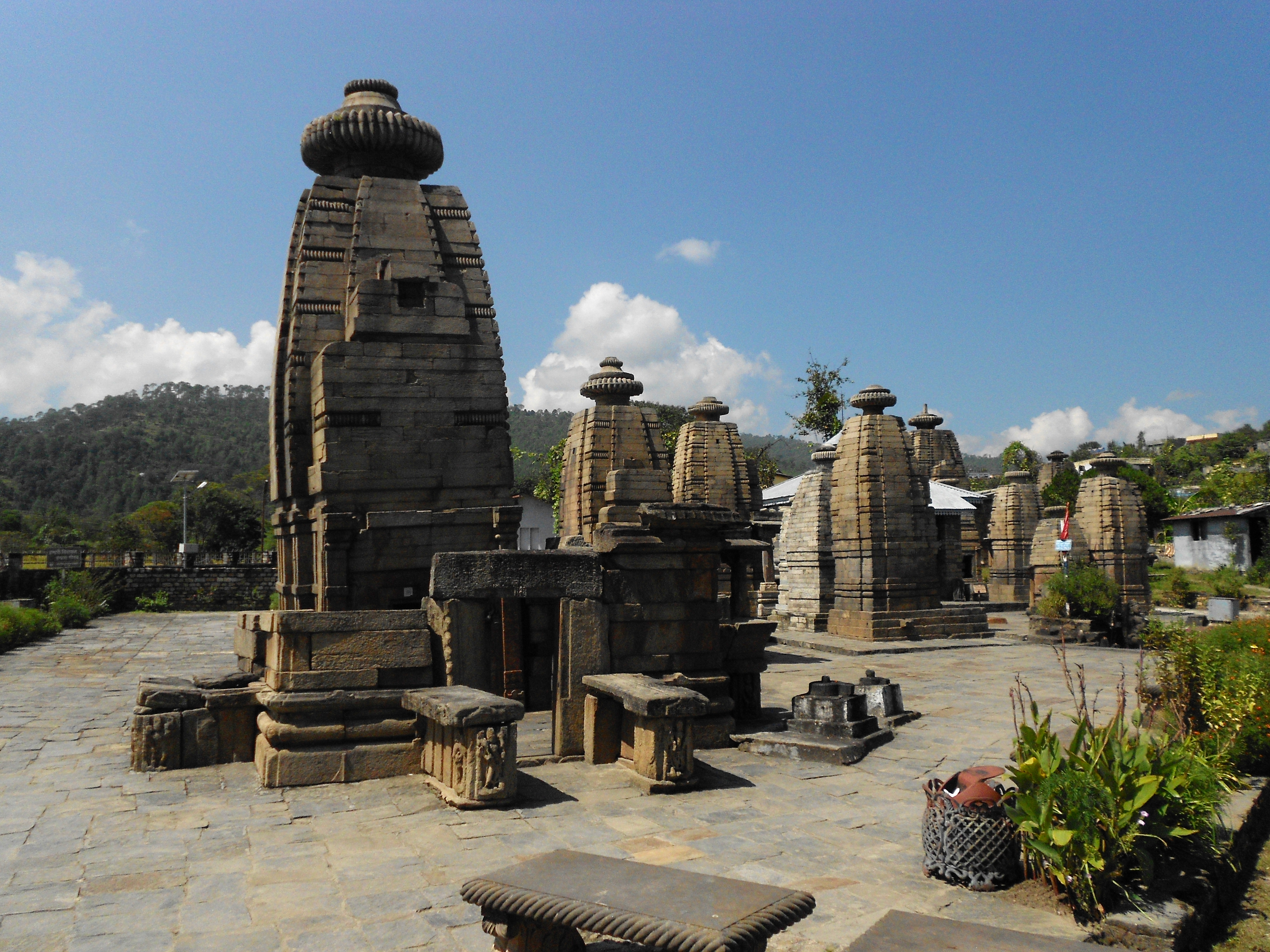
Temples of Baijnath

There is a famous temple on the bank of the river which is said to have been built by the Kumaon Katyuri king in around 1150 AD. It was capital of the Katyuri dynasty of kings who ruled Uttaranchal during 12th and 13th century when it was known as Kartikyapura. The temple holds significance because, according to Hindu mythology, Lord Shiva and Parvati were married at the confluence of River Gomati and Garur Ganga. Dedicated to SivaVaidyanatha, the Lord of Physicians, the Baijnath temple is actually a temples’ complex built by the Katyuri kings with the idols of Shiva, Ganesh, Parvati, Chandika, Kuber, Surya and Brahma.

== Transport ==
Pantnagar Airport, located in Pantnagar is the nearest airport, while Kathgodam railway station is the nearest railway station to Baijnath. Baijnath is located at the junction of the Bageshwar-Gwaldam and the Almora-Gopeshwar road. It is connected to Haldwani, Bhimtal, Almora and Ranikhet by the 'Kumaun Darshan' service of Uttarakhand Transport Corporation.

A discussion is being held on laying a railway track between Tanakpur to Bageshwar which if materialised would bring this district on faster national connectivity and invite much larger tourist population by 2020.

== Gallery ==
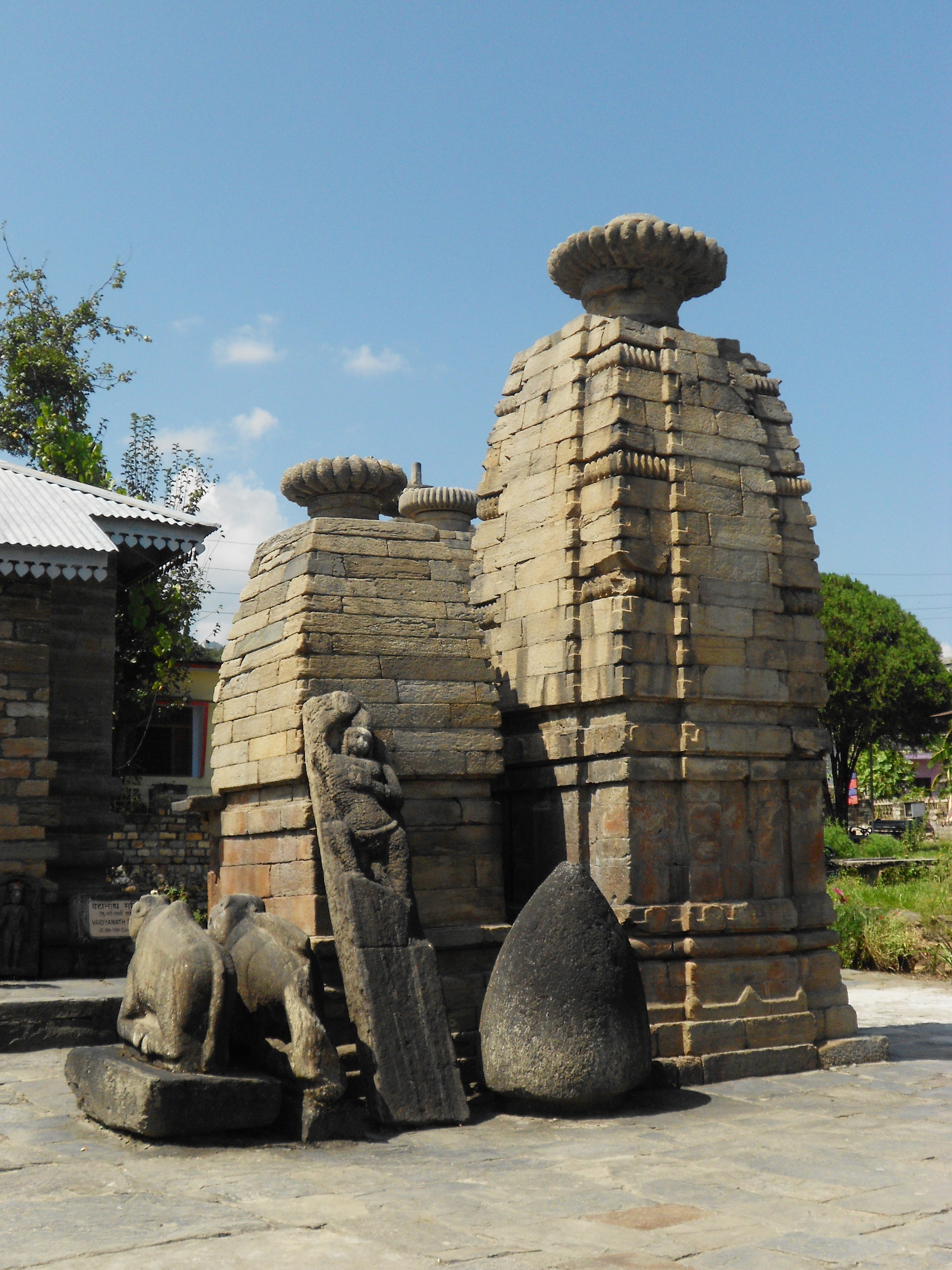

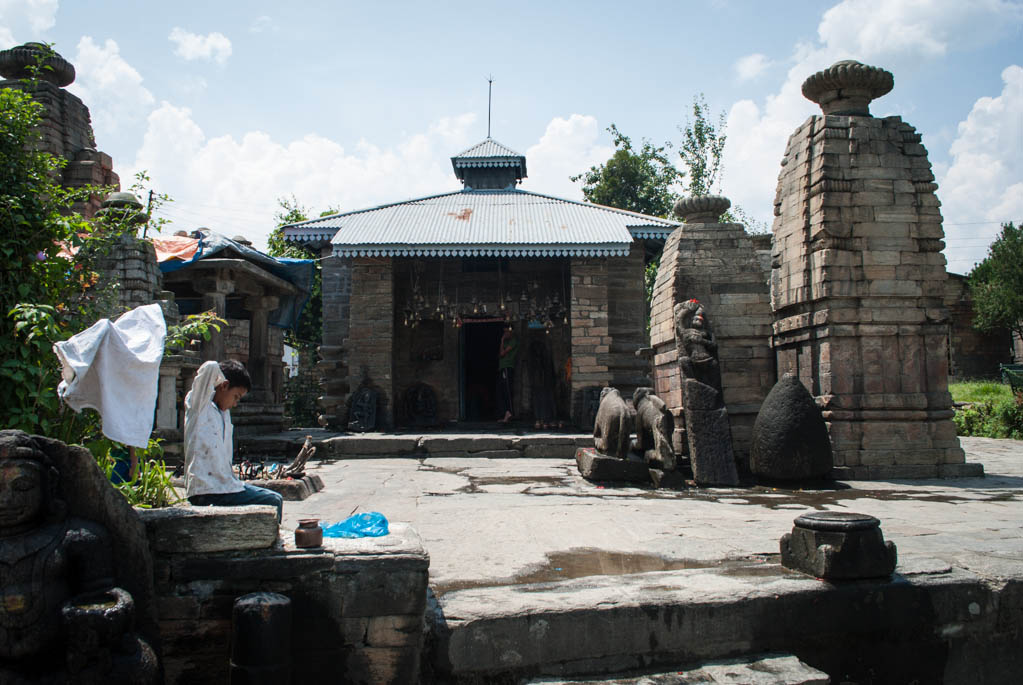

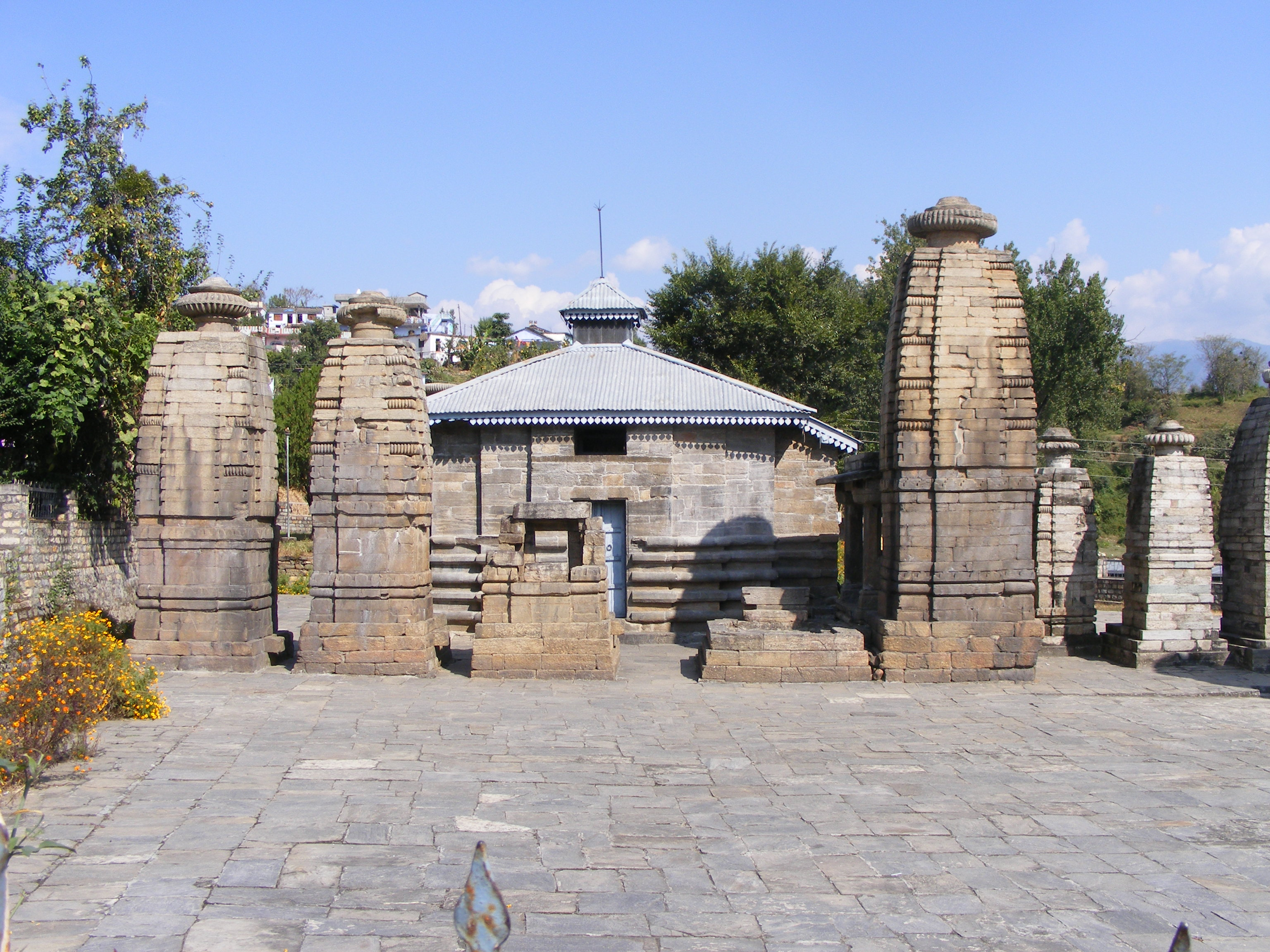

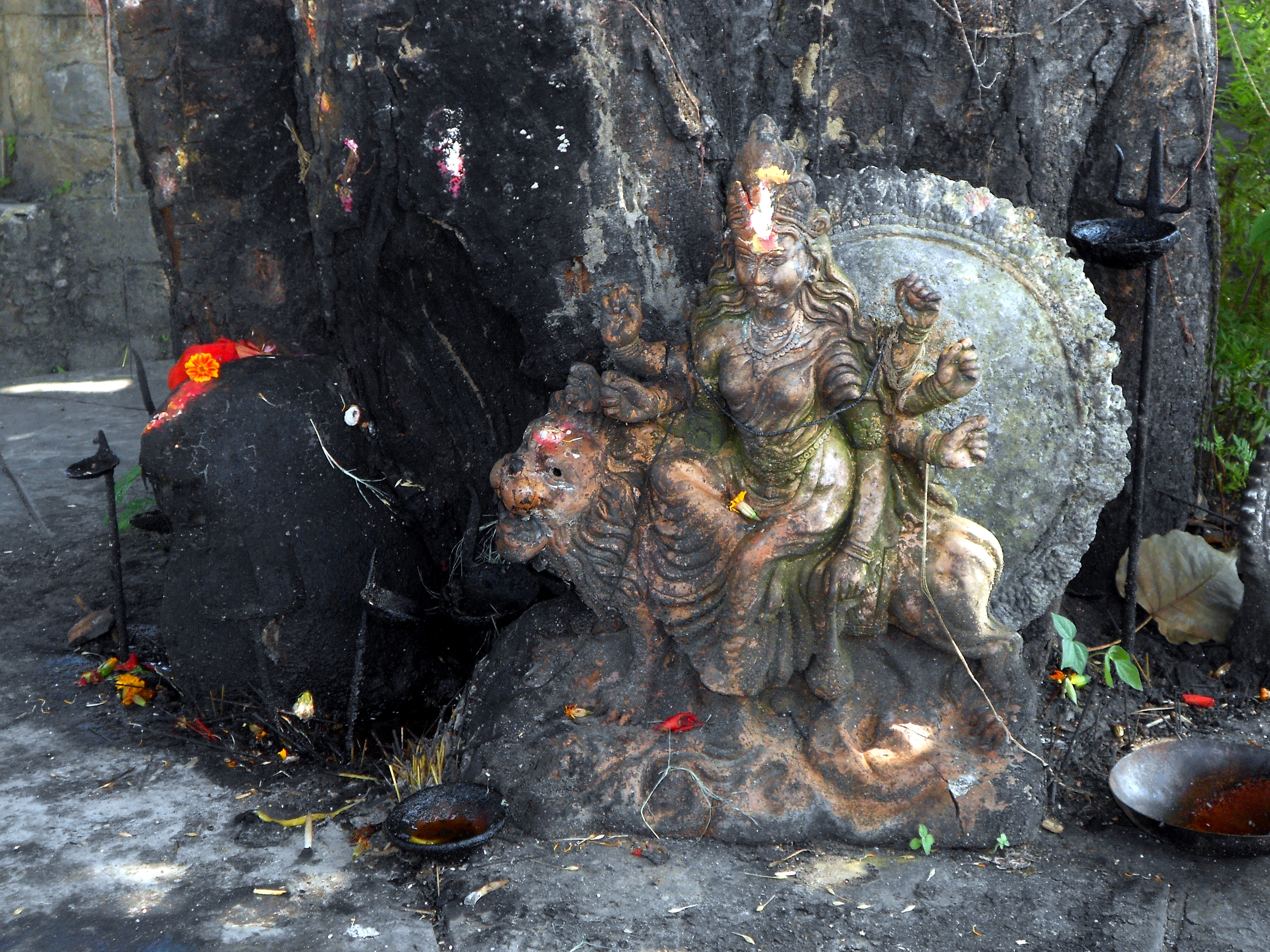

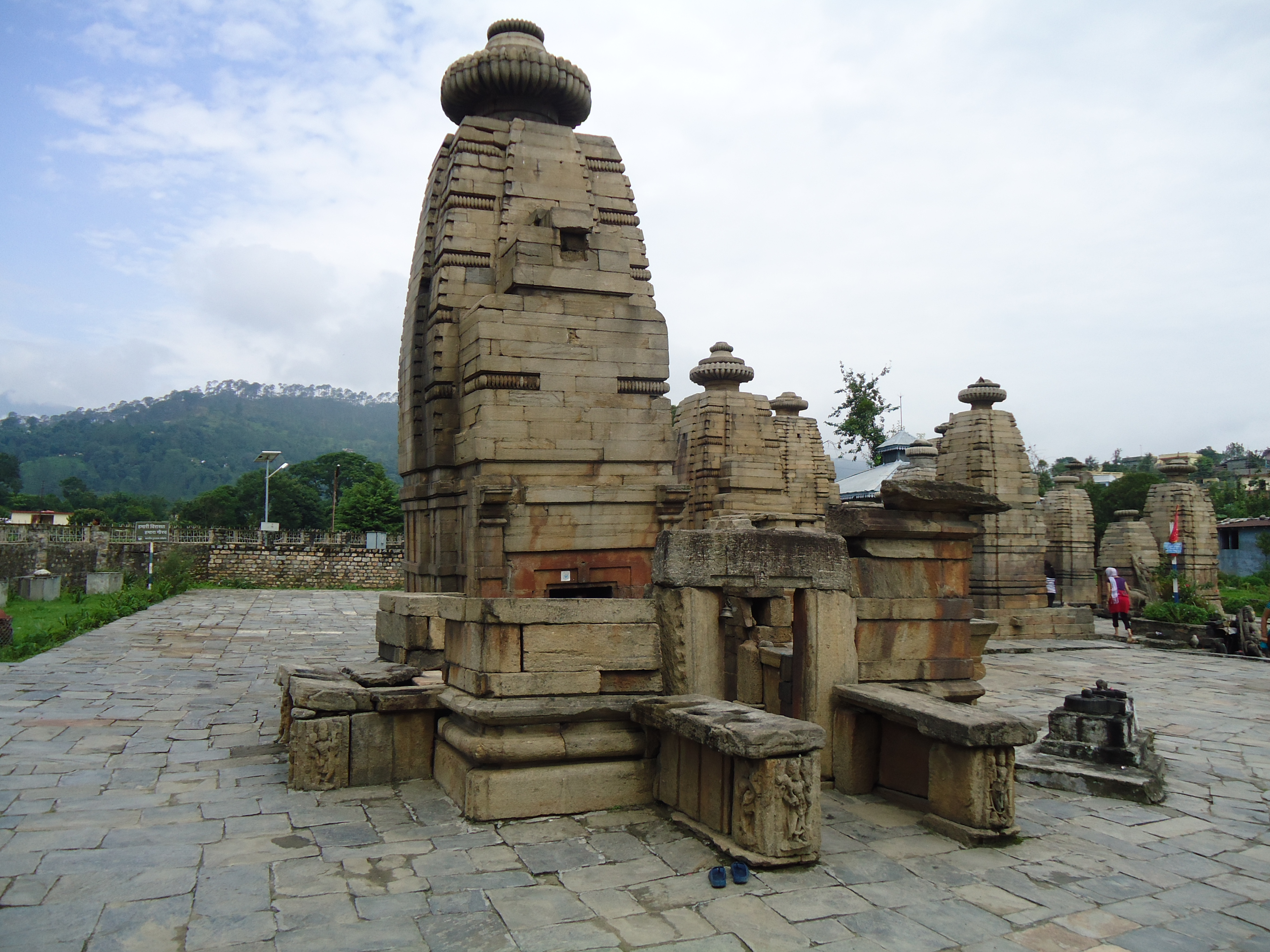

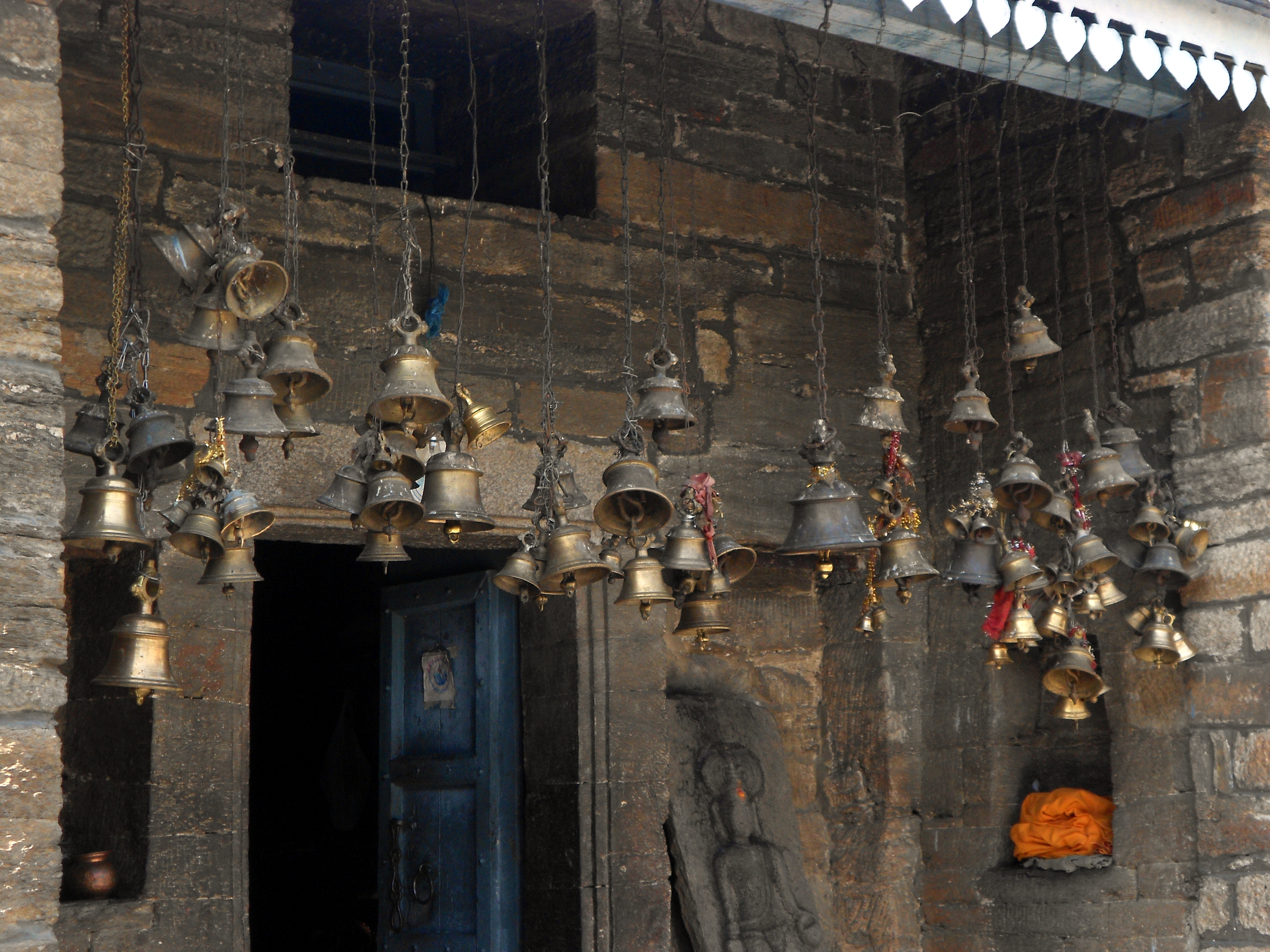

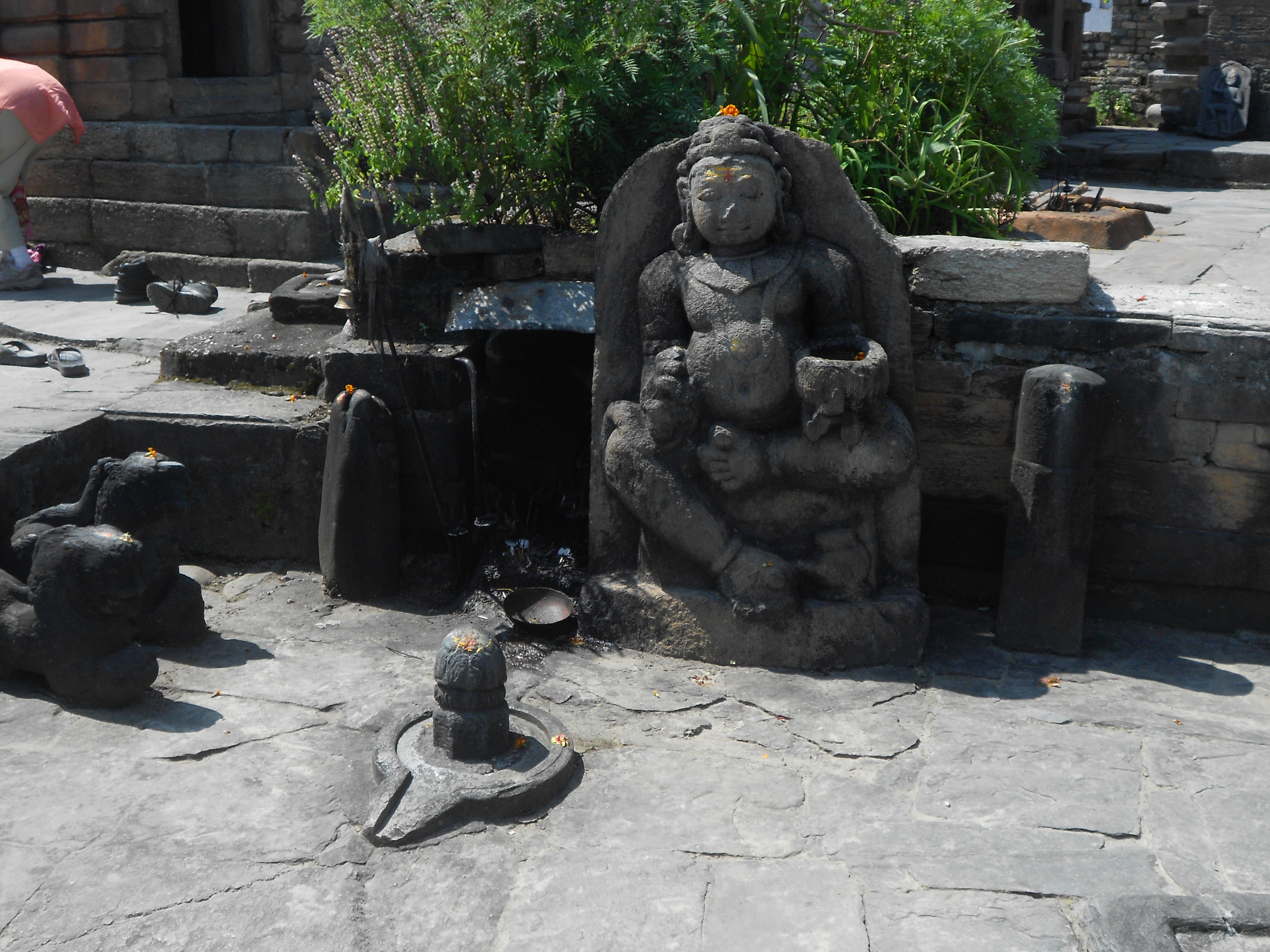

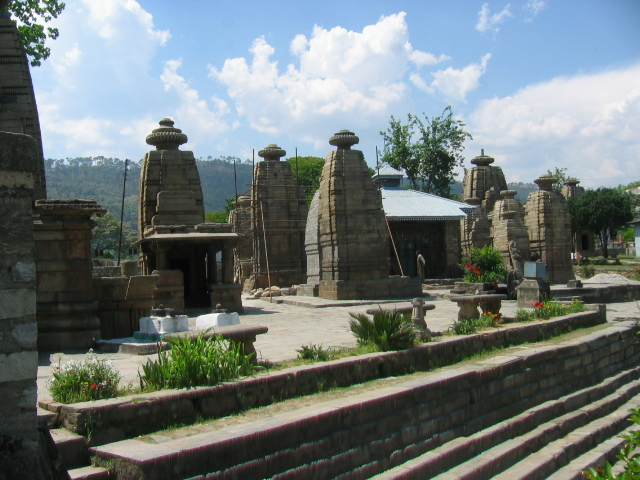
