= Mountain Temples and Temple Mountains =

Book by Nachiket Chanchani

Mountain Temples and Temple Mountains: Architecture, Religion, and Nature in the Central Himalayas
- Author: Nachiket Chanchani
- Language: English
- Series: Global South Asia
- Subject: Art history, architecture, nature, anthropology
- Publisher: University of Washington Press
- Publication date: April 2019
- Publication place: United States
- Media type: Print (Hardback)
- Pages: 288
- ISBN: 978-0295744513
- OCLC: 1111898011
- Dewey Decimal: 294.5/350954
- LC Class: 2018012494

Mountain Temples and Temple Mountains: Architecture, Religion, and Nature in the Central Himalayas is a 2019 book by art historian Nachiket Chanchani, associate professor at University of Michigan, Ann Arbor, that provides a complete historical survey of temple architecture in the Indian state of Uttarakhand (also known as Devabhumi, Sanskrit for "Land of the Gods"), and explores how the Central Himalaya region, home to many pilgrimage sites, came to acquire immense religious significance for Hindus. It is the first complete art historical and architectural survey of the under-studied region.

== Synopsis ==
Between the third century BCE and 13th century CE, the region that is modern-day Uttarakhand acquired immense religious significance and became home to many pilgrimage sites, most notably the Char Dham, considered to be among the holiest pilgrimage sites for Hindus. Chanchani's book studies the many stone edifices and steles that were erected across the region, many in remote areas, during that period. The book charts the architectural history of the structures and temples, the sociopolitical context in which they arose, and their effects on the surrounding landscape, including the natural environment.

== Reception ==
The book was well-received and noted for being the first exhaustive survey of an under-studied region. Tamara Sears, associate professor of art history at Rutgers University, praised the book in her review in the Journal of the Society of Architectural Historians: "What makes Nachiket Chanchani's new book Mountain Temples and Temple Mountains such a monumental achievement, however, is not merely the fact that it brings to light a remarkable range of unknown monuments but also that it so convincingly asserts their centrality within the broader history of temple architecture on the Indian subcontinent." She goes on to acknowledge Chanchani's "rigorous fieldwork" and "close visual analysis with theoretical sophistication".

In The Journal of Asian Studies, anthropologist Joseph Alter wrote: "Although the region is of tremendous importance in the landscape of South Asian pilgrimage and ascetic world renunciation, there has not been a comprehensive study of this sacred geography's cultural history until the publication of this beautifully written, deeply engrossing and insightfully interdisciplinary book."

== See also ==
- Hindu Temples: What Happened to Them
