= Baijnath Temple Complex =

Cluster of 18 Hindu temples, Baijnath, Uttarakhand, India

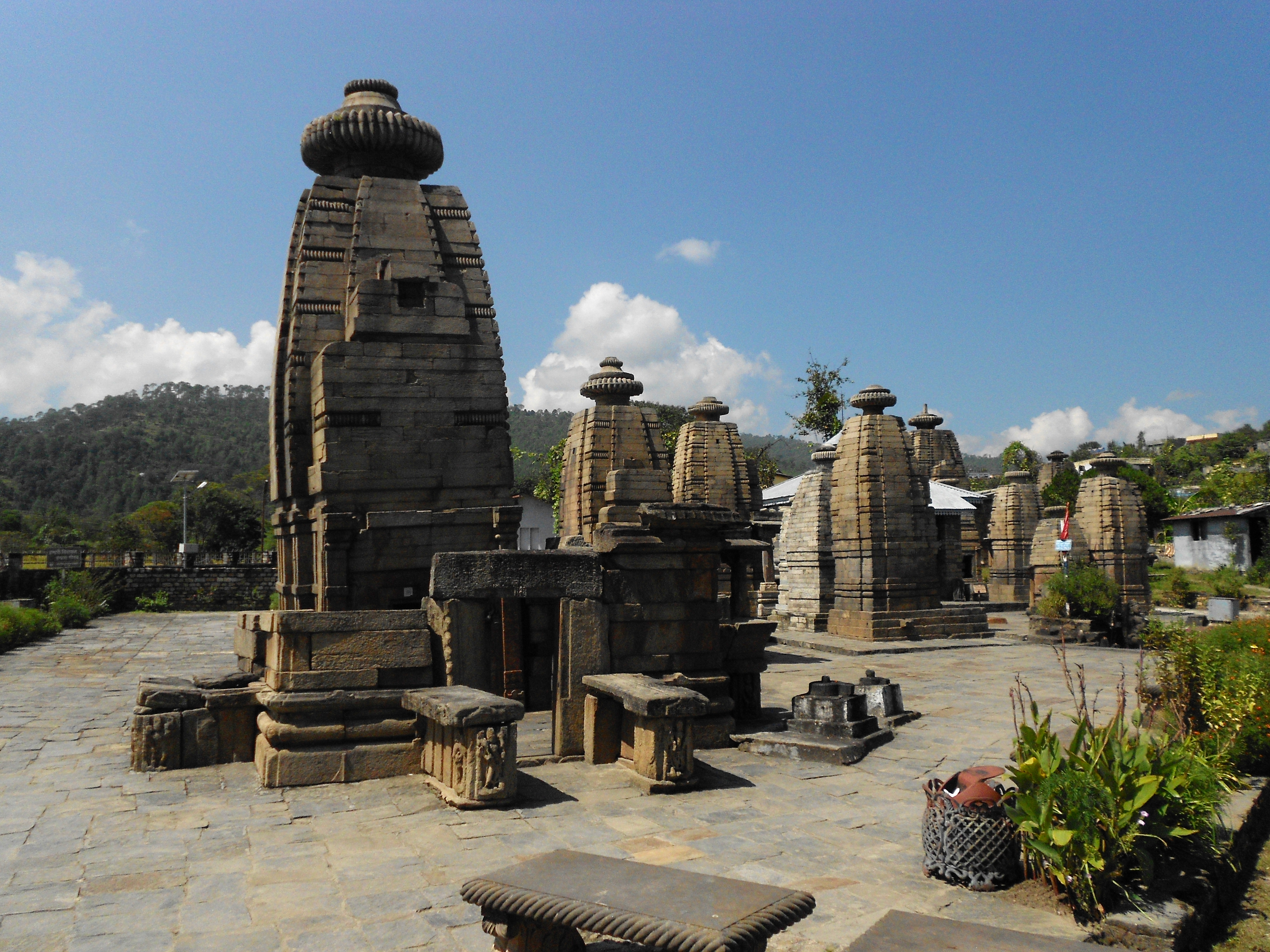
- Group of Temples at Baijnath, Uttarakhand, India

- Location in Uttarakhand

Religion
- Affiliation: Hinduism
- District: Bageshwar district
- Deity: Vaidyanath (Shiva)

Location
- Location: Baijnath
- State: Uttarakhand
- Country: India
- Interactive map of Baijnath Temple Complex
- Coordinates: 29.92°N 79.625°E

Architecture
- Type: Nagara
- Creator: Katyuri Kings
- Completed: 12th century CE

Specifications
- Temple: 18
- Elevation: 1,125 m (3,691 ft)

Baijnath Temple Complex is a cluster of 18 Hindu temples which are situated in the town of Baijnath in Uttarakhand, India. The complex is located in Bageshwar district along the banks of Gomati river at an elevation of 1,125 m (3,691 ft) above the mean sea level. These temples are renowned for possibly being one of the very few temples in the world where Parvati is depicted with her husband Shiva. Pilgrims arrive here on occasion of Shivratri and Makar Sankranti.

It is a cluster of 18 stone temples situated on the left bank of Gomati river. There are 102 stone images, some of which are under worship, while other have been reserved by the Archaeological Survey of India. The principle deities at Baijnath temple complex are the Vaidyanath (Shiva), Parvati, Nritya Ganapati, Karttikeya, Narsimha, Brahma, Mahishasurmardini, Sapta Nartikas, Surya, Garuda and Kubera.

== Location & Architecture ==
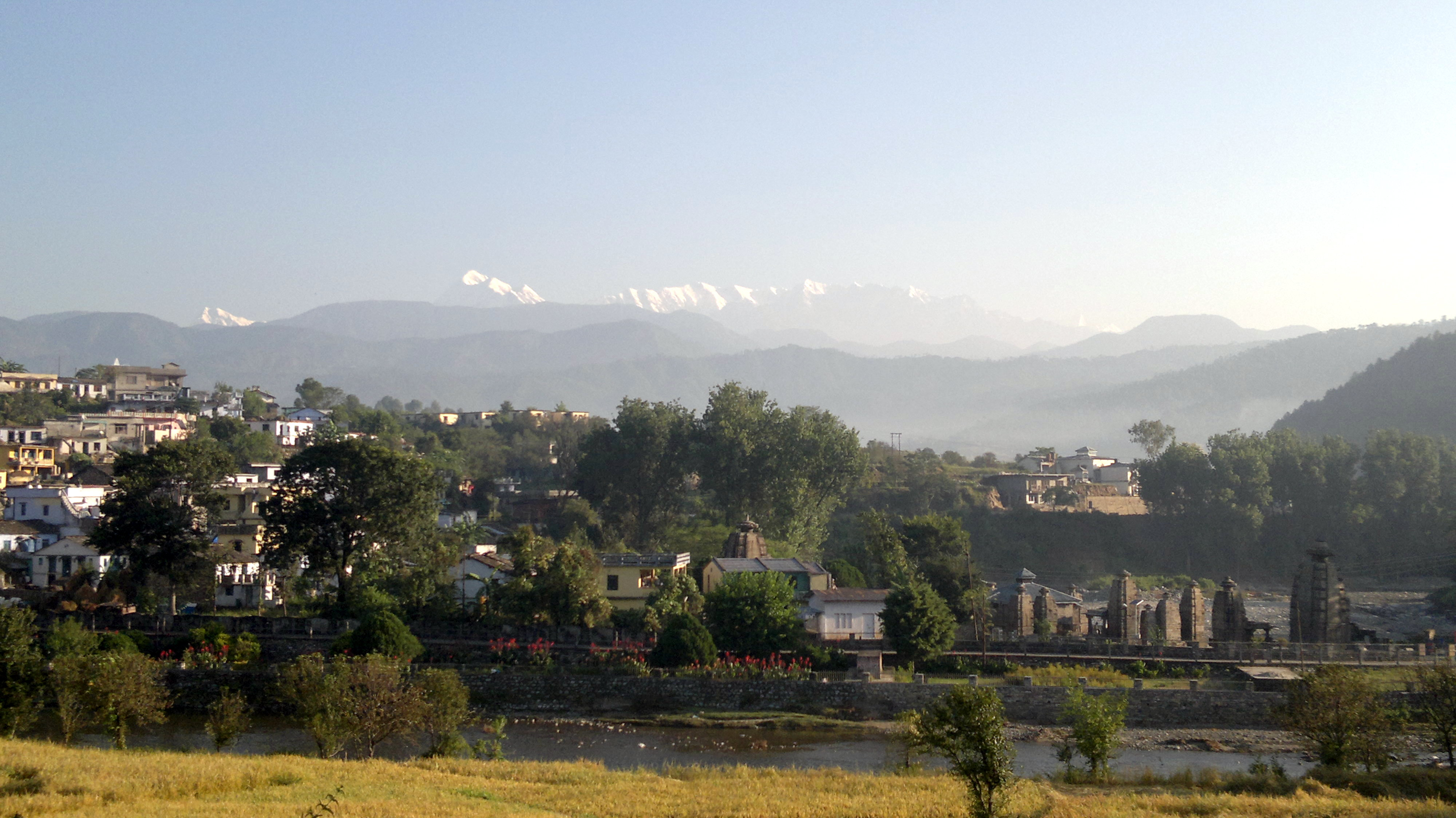
The temple complex is situated in the eastern part of Baijnath town.

Baijnath Temple complex is located in the eastern part of the Baijnath town at 29.92°N 79.625°E, on the left bank of Gomati river. It is located in the Bageshwar district at a distance of 22 km from Bageshwar and 16 km from Kausani. The temple is approached from the riverside by a flight of steps made of stones constructed by the orders of a Katyuri queen.

The main shrine in the complex is dedicated to Vaidyanath Shiva in the form of a lingam. The depiction of Parvati, made of grey chloride schist, is a marvel of art. Another sculptural element of note is a life-size image of Kal Bhairava in vilasasana seated outside the Vaidyanath Temple.

== History ==
When the Katyuri kings shifted their capital from Joshimath to Kartikeyapura, a large number of followers of estoric shaiva sects like the Lakulisha, Nath (Kanphata), Jangam, Vairagi, Sanyasi also followed them. In order to rehabilitate them, The katyuris built a large complex of temples dedicated to Vaidyanath Shiva, the name later got corrupted to Baijnath.

Several inscriptions dating back to 1202 CE have been found in the Temple complex. The temples were restored and rebuilt during the reign of king Gyan Chand. The temple complex was plundered by the Rohillas in 1743-1744 CE which led to the destruction of the Shikhar of the main shrine.

== Bibliography ==
- Handa, O.C.; Jain, Madhu (2009). Art & architecture of Uttarakhand (1st Indian ed.). New Delhi: Pentagon Press. ISBN 9788182744172.
- Pande, Badri Datt (1993). History of Kumaun : English version of "Kumaun ka itihas" (1. publ. ed.). Almora: Shree Almora Book Depot. ISBN 9788190020947.
- Handa, O.C. (2002). History of Uttaranchal. New Delhi: Indus Pub. Company. ISBN 9788173871344.
- Budhwar, Prem K. (2010). The Call of the Mountains: Uttrakhand Explored. New Delhi: Har-Anand Publications. ISBN 9788124115299.
- Nag, Prithvish (1999). Tourism and Trekking in Nainital Region. New Delhi: Concept Publishing Company. ISBN 9788170227694.
