= Dhaun =

- Village
- View of Dhaun village
- Interactive map of Dhaun
- Coordinates: 29.267736°N 80.099710°E
- Country: India
- State: Uttarakhand
- District: Champawat
- Tehsil: Champawat
- PIN: 262523
- Vehicle registration: UK-03
- Languages
  - Official: Hindi
  - Native: Kumaoni

Dhaun is a village in the Champawat Tehsil of Champawat district, Uttarakhand, India, located along National Highway 9 in the Kumaon division. Situated at an elevation of about 1,500 metres and roughly 14 km south-east of Champawat town, the village had a population of 364 across 70 households according to the 2011 Census of India, with the census village code 053869. Historically associated with the Dhauni and Rawat communities, Dhaun was recorded as an independent revenue unit named Dhoun Rout in 19th-century British settlement records. It holds cultural significance in Kumaoni folklore through the legends of folk deity Bhaga Dhaunyani, commemorated by a local shrine and a historic stone. Supported primarily by terraced agriculture and horticulture, the village features a Government Inter College, a Primary Health Centre, and local landmarks such as the perennial Henry Waterfall.

== Geography and climate ==
According to the 2011 Census of India, Dhaun covers a total geographical area of 190.21 hectares. Geographically, it is situated along the 118 km stretch of National Highway 9 (also known as N.H. 125) that connects Bastia to Ghat. The village's topography features hills and lower regions, along with small rivulets that serve as natural habitats and migratory routes for wildlife, such as leopards and deer. The village sits at an elevation of approximately 1,500 metres (4,900 ft) above sea level, and its surrounding ecosystem is predominantly characterized by oak forests, with major plant species including Quercus leucotrichophora (banj oak) and Pinus roxburghii (chir pine), alongside Myrica esculenta (kafal) and Shorea robusta (sal). Dhaun experiences a temperate climate influenced by its elevation, marked by severe winters from December to March with precipitation often occurring as snowfall in higher reaches due to western disturbances. Temperatures in the region range from a recorded maximum of 30.3 °C (86.5 °F) to a minimum of 1.7 °C (35.1 °F), with January being the coldest month, when cold waves can occasionally push temperatures below freezing. About 75 percent of the annual precipitation falls during the south-west monsoon season from June to September—with July and August accounting for roughly half of the yearly rainfall—while November remains largely dry. Relative humidity exceeds 80 percent during the monsoon months and drops to around 35 percent during pre-monsoon afternoons.

== History ==
Historical documents and local folklore state that the ancestors of the Dhauni community originally came from historical cities of North India, like Dharanagari or Jhansi. They first settled at a place called Dhaun on the Pithoragarh–Tanakpur route. According to author and historian Dr. Ram Singh, these ancestors were two brothers. The older brother settled in a jagir in the Mangol patti, which became known as Maun Kana, and his descendants are called Mauni. The younger brother continued to live in Dhaun, and his descendants came to be known as Dhauni. Later, the ancestors of the Dhauni people settled in Silang village, the central place of Gumdesh, also known as Chamdewal, where the Chand kings assigned them eastern border responsibilities. Following the relocation of the Dhauni ancestors, the area was subsequently settled by a notable population of the Rawat community. According to Badri Datt Pandey's book History of Kumaun, the Rawat people were the ancient inhabitants and rulers of Daunkot. His accounts further specify that the main fort of the Rawat Raja was located half a mile west of Rajbunga. Geographically, this ancient Daunkot fort was situated near the present-day district headquarters, approximately 14 km north-west of the modern Dhaun village. Edwin T. Atkinson's Himalayan Gazetteer further records that the Rawat rulers of Daunkot eventually lost their territory when Som Chand, with the assistance of the Taragi clan, defeated the Rawat Raja. Following the loss of their royal power, the descendants of the Rawat rulers scattered across different regions of Kali Kumaon, and settled in Gumdesh, Salli village of the Charal patti, and Dhoun village in the Palbelon Malla area. The historical presence of the Rawat community in the village is distinctly documented in early British colonial revenue records, where the settlement was officially registered as an independent land revenue unit named Dhoun Rout in the Palbeloun malla patti of Kalee Kumaon. According to the Beckett Settlement report, colonial registers document the village's land revenue assessments for the years 1823, 1828, 1832, and 1844 AD, recorded as Vikram Samvat 1880 (the historic Assi Sala Bandobast), 1885, 1889, and 1901, where Dhoun Rout was recorded as mouzah number 2. Furthermore, historical census data from the Beckett Settlement recorded the village's demographic profile, with a total of 38 inhabitants comprising 27 males and 11 females.

== Demographics and migration ==
According to the 2011 Census of India, Dhaun has 70 households. The total population is 364, comprising 184 males and 180 females, which gives the village an overall sex ratio of 978 females per 1,000 males. There are 68 children in the age group of 0 to 6 years, resulting in a child sex ratio of 1,061. The effective literacy rate stands at 81.42%. A total of 87 residents account for 23.9% of the population and belong to Scheduled Castes, with no Scheduled Tribe population recorded in the village. As part of the wider Champawat district, the area around Dhaun is subject to regional demographic trends, such as temporary and circular migration. Due to limited non-agricultural employment and higher educational facilities in the broader region, working-age men often travel to urban centers for work, but typically maintain strong ties to their native villages and regularly return home.

== Economy and agriculture ==
Agricultural landscape and terraced fields in Dhaun

The local economy of Dhaun in Champawat is primarily agrarian, supported by horticulture and a growing tertiary sector. Because of small, fragmented terraced fields, cultivation relies largely on family and reciprocal exchange labour. In recent years, the non-farm economy has expanded through local retail shops and transport services along NH-9 alongside remittances from out-migrants working in urban centres. Consistent with the mid-hill agrarian pattern of the district, agriculture is predominantly rainfed, while fodder and fuelwood are managed through community-led Van Panchayats. Major ecological constraints affecting local farming include erratic rainfall and crop depredation by wild boars and monkeys.

Agricultural Profile of Dhaun
Category	Details
Workforce (2011)	168 total workers: 122 cultivators, 0 agricultural labourers and 46 other/household workers (including main and marginal workers)
Kharif crops	Paddy, maize and millets (mandua, jhangora)
Rabi crops	Wheat, barley, mustard and pulses (lentils, urad)
Horticulture	Citrus (malta), stone fruits (peaches, plums, apricots), apples, walnuts and off-season vegetables (potatoes, ginger)
Livestock	Indigenous Badri cattle and goats

== Civic administration and utility ==
The village is administered under the Dhaun Raut Gram Panchayat within the Champawat Kshetra Panchayat. The official Local Government Directory (LGD) code for the gram panchayat is 22703. Postal services to the village are provided through the Dhaun Branch Post Office (PIN: 262523) which operates as an active delivery office. Dhaun is fully electrified and is connected to a piped water supply network under the Jal Jeevan Mission. In addition, the village relies on traditional groundwater sources, such as stepwells (naula).

== Education and healthcare ==
=== Education ===
View of the school campus at Dhaun village

Early childhood and primary education are provided by a local Anganwadi centre and Government Primary School (GPS) Dhaunrawat. Established in 1998, it is a co-educational Hindi-medium school managed by the Department of Education, offering classes from 1 to 5 with an on-site Anganwadi centre. Secondary and higher secondary education are provided by Government Inter College (GIC) Dhaun. Established in 1986, it is a co-educational state board school offering classes from 6 to 12. The campus features a library, a playground, and electricity. Like many rural Himalayan schools, GIC Dhaun occasionally experiences shortages of permanent teaching staff, which the education department manages by deploying guest teachers to maintain academic continuity. For transportation, students have access to the state's "Vidyavahini" bus service. Additionally, the school was selected for the "Lab on Wheels" mobile science program. Run in collaboration with UCOST, the state government, and the Agastya International Foundation, this initiative provides rural students in classes 6 to 10 with access to science experiments and laboratory equipment.

=== Healthcare ===
Primary healthcare services in Dhaun are provided at a local primary health centre (PHC), which has been upgraded to an 'Ayushman Arogya Mandir' to offer both curative and preventive healthcare. Previously, remote health centers in the region faced a severe shortage of medical staff. To address this and improve local healthcare delivery, the state government appointed a permanent medical officer to the Dhaun PHC as part of a broader district-wide initiative. The medical officer currently oversees routine outpatient department (OPD) services and vaccination programs.

== Cultural heritage and folklore ==
=== Bhaga Dhaunani Mata temple ===
The shrine of Bhaga Dhaunani Mata situated along the highway in Dhaun.

Monument preserving Bhaga Dhaunyaniko Udhyuno in Dhaun, Champawat

Front view of Bhaga Dhaunani Temple

According to regional oral traditions (Raag-Bhag), Bhaga Dhaunyani was the great ancestor of the Dhoni community and a symbol of matriarchal power. Her historical significance and bravery are documented by historian Dr. Ram Singh in his book Raag-Bhag Kali Kumaon. In local folklore, a 4 to 5 quintal (400–500 kg) flat rectangular granite stone located near the modern Dhaun bus stand is associated with her. Known as Bhaga Dhaunyaniko Udhyuno, local legends state she was incredibly strong and carried this massive sickle-sharpening stone wrapped in the folds of her traditional ghaghari while going to cut grass. In modern Hindi literature, author Laxman Singh Bisht 'Batrohi' immortalizes this stone in his narrative Kimpurush: Kramashah and his other work Hum Teen Thokdar.

=== Religious beliefs and kuldevi ===
Ancient temple of Goddess Jhalimali, the kuldevi of the Raut (Rawat) and Mahar kings, in Funger village, Champawat

According to historical research by author Dr. Arun Khuksal, Maa Jhalimali was the primary family deity (kuldevi) of the ancient Suryavanshi Katyuri dynasty and the Raut (Rawat) and Mahar kings of the Kali Kumaon region. Oral traditions and jagars suggest that Maa Jhalimali was originally a Katyuri princess who came to be revered and deified as a protective guardian of the dynasty. In Himalayan traditions, Maa Jhalimali is venerated as the goddess of war and fire. Her original shrine is located in Fungar village, Champawat. Furthermore, regional rulers and feudal lords carried her jot (sacred flame) into military campaigns to instill courage among soldiers and seek divine protection. Her historical, commercial, and cultural significance—including references to ancient trade routes with Tibet (as the deity of the Huns)—is documented in traditional folk songs (Shakunakhar) and regional folklore. In regional folk ballads, the miraculous power of Kuldevi Jhalimali is vividly depicted in the tale of Sadai, who was granted a brother as a boon from the goddess. When Sadai later sacrificed her two sons to fulfill her vow, the goddess miraculously resurrected the children back to life.

== Places of interest ==
=== Henry Waterfall ===
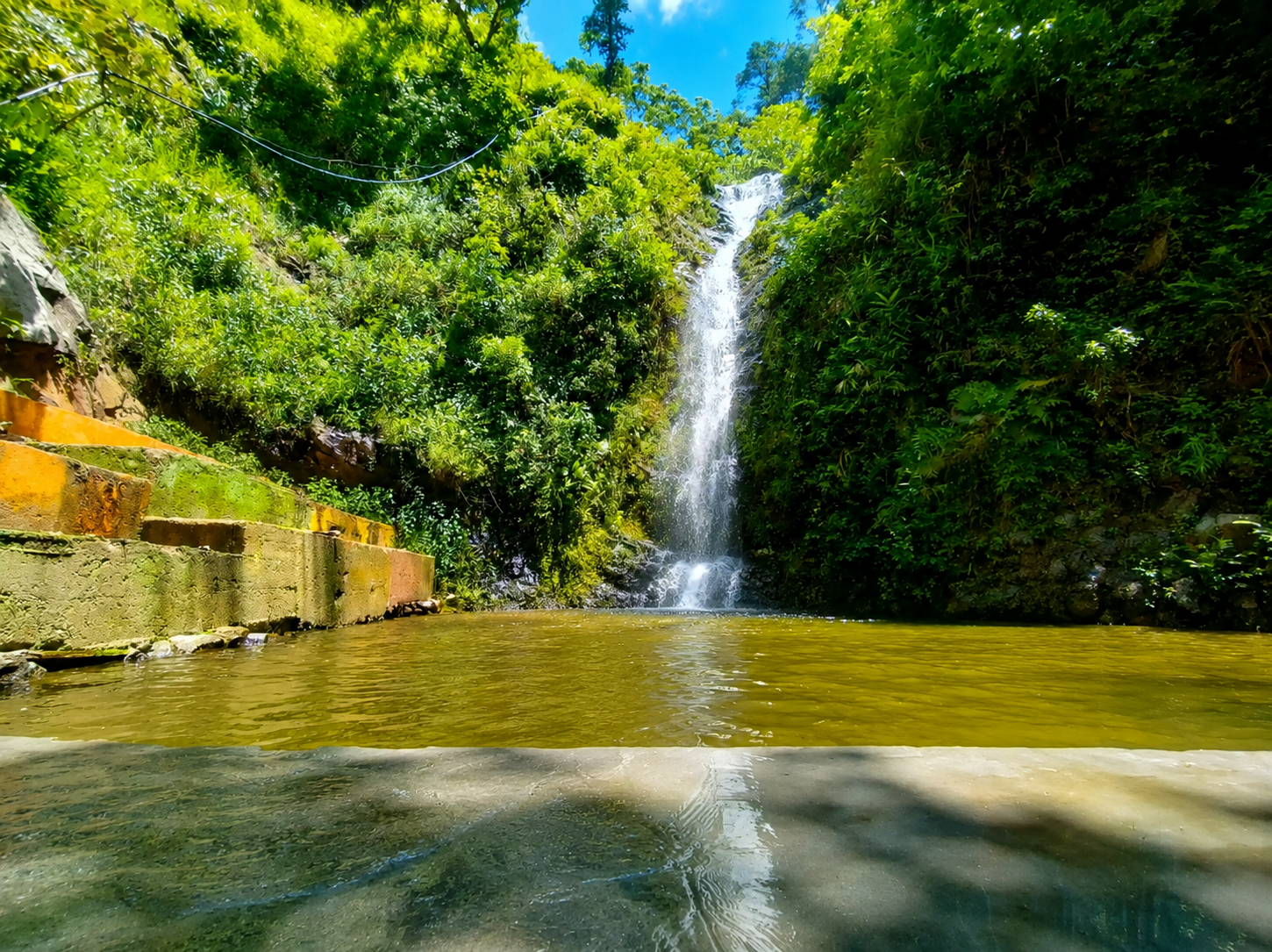
Henry Waterfall

Henry Waterfall is a perennial waterfall with a drop of approximately 40 ft (12 m). It is situated in Bettigad of the Dhaunraut gram panchayat in Champawat district, near the Tanakpur-Pithoragarh national highway. The waterfall earned its name in the 19th century after frequent visits by British officer Henry Ramsay. Its water flow increases by up to 30 percent during the monsoon season. The site received infrastructure development and beautification during the 2022–23 financial year under the MGNREGA scheme. The project included the construction of an approach path, along with check dams and retaining walls. The development also created a 300-square-foot water catchment area with two small reservoirs and seating parapets. Furthermore, the year-round water availability is being utilized for irrigation and the construction of tanks for pisciculture (fish farming) to support the local economy.

=== Dhaun Cricket Ground ===
A wide view of Dhaun Cricket Ground with local spectators watching a match

Dhaun Cricket Ground (also known as Dhaun Khel Maidan) is a well-known local sports ground located in the Dhaun area of Champawat district, Uttarakhand. Serving as an active venue for rural sports activities, the ground regularly hosts local cricket tournaments and matches that draw participation from youth across the village and surrounding border areas. One of the primary competitions hosted at this venue is the Naunchula Cricket Tournament conducted by the local Naunchula Cricket Committee, which held its third edition in November 2026. During the 2026 tournament, the Champawat district magistrate also visited the ground to encourage young players and raise awareness against drug abuse among local residents.

== Transport ==
Dhaun is situated on National Highway 9 (formerly NH 125), an arterial route that connects Tanakpur on the plains to the higher Himalayan regions, including Pithoragarh. The village lies approximately 14 km south-east of the district headquarters at Champawat. Regional public transit along the national highway is provided by Uttarakhand Transport Corporation (UTC) and Kumaon Motor Owners' Union (KMOU) buses, alongside locally operated shared passenger taxis and vans. Tanakpur railway station, situated roughly 60 km to the south, serves as the nearest railhead connecting the region to the North Eastern Railway network. The nearest operational commercial airport is Pantnagar Airport (approximately 160 km away), while the regional Naini Saini Airport is located in Pithoragarh.
