= Champawat district =

Champawat district Kali Kumaon
- District of Uttarakhand
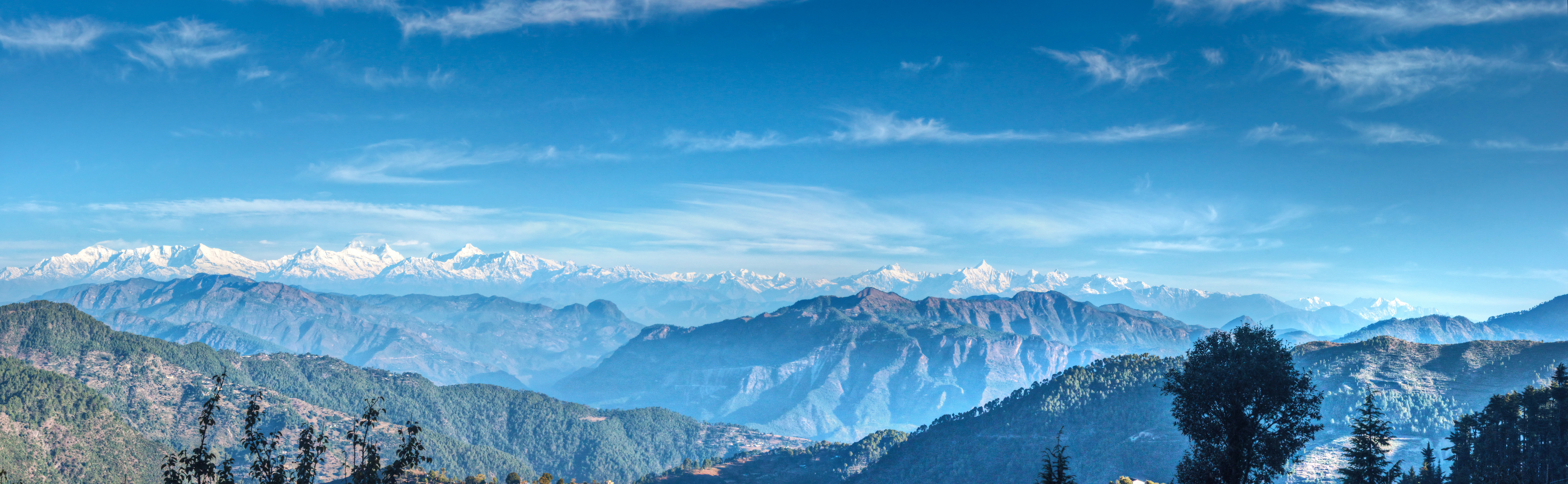
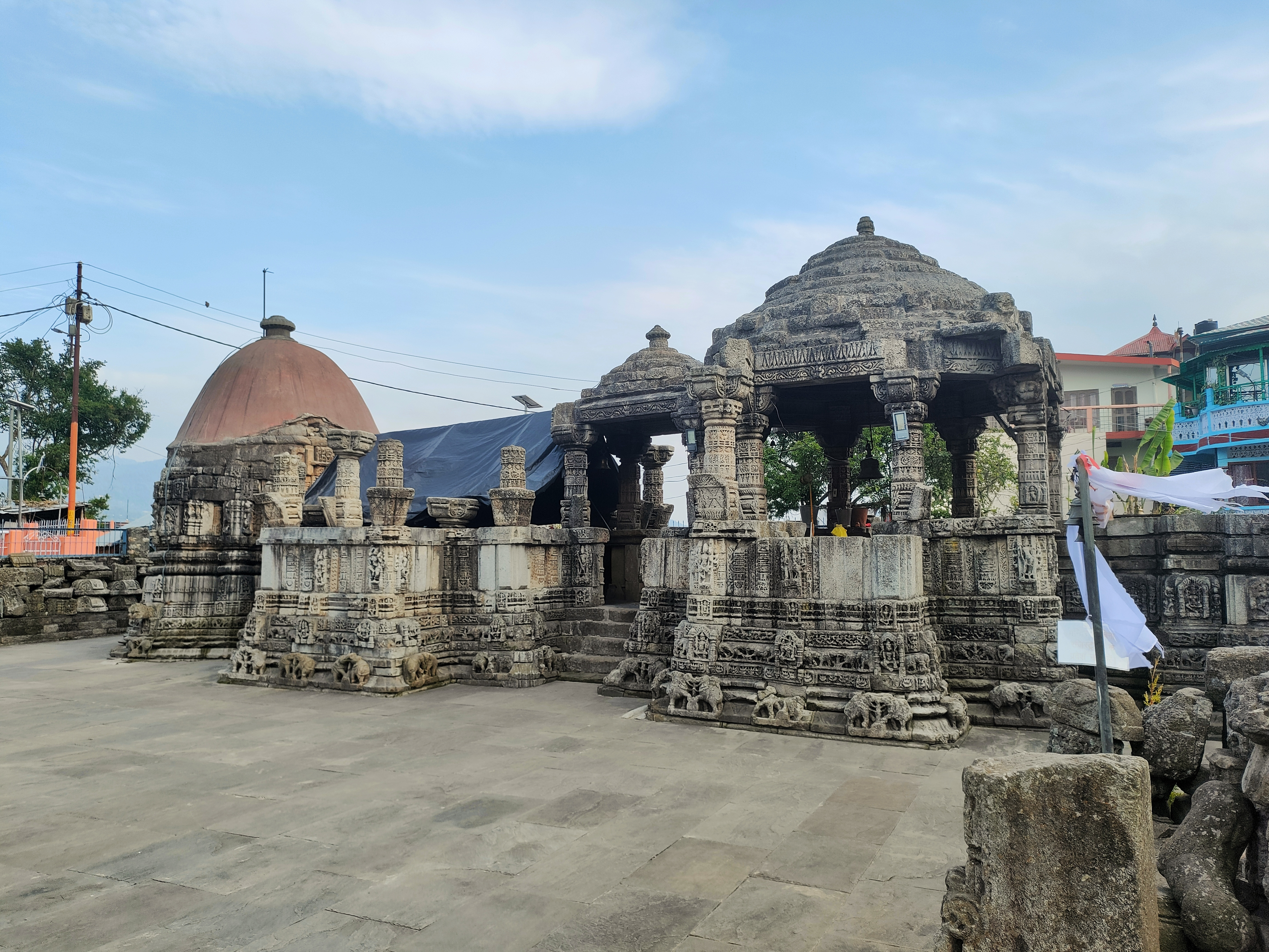
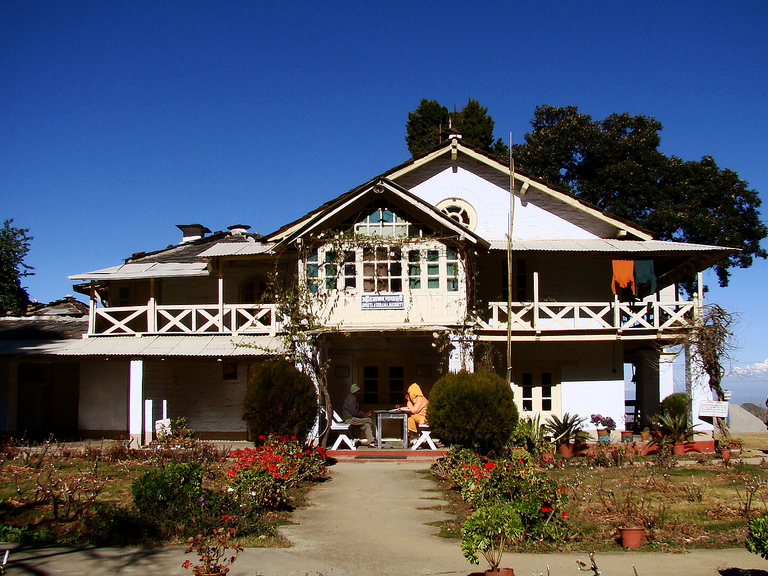
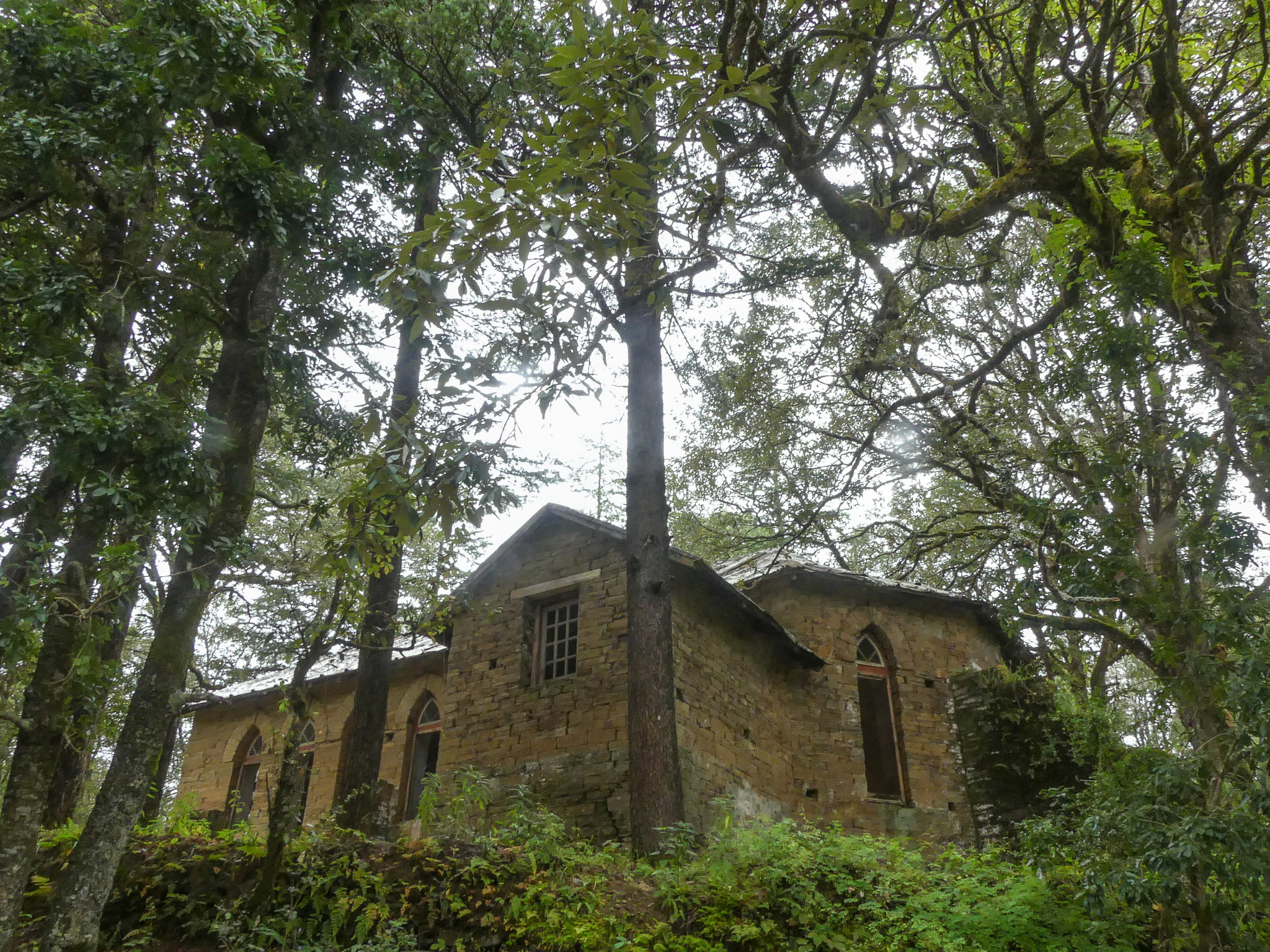
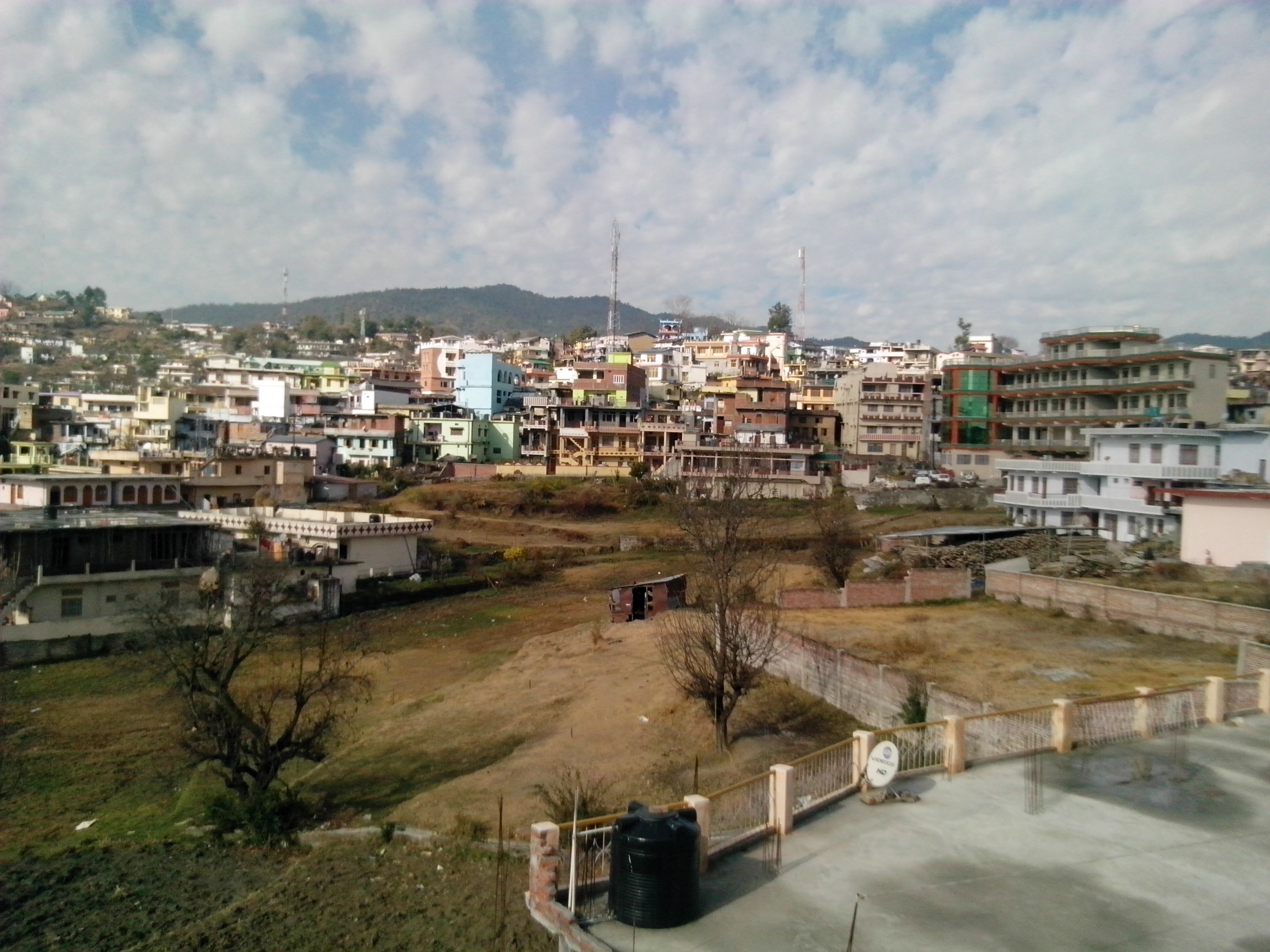
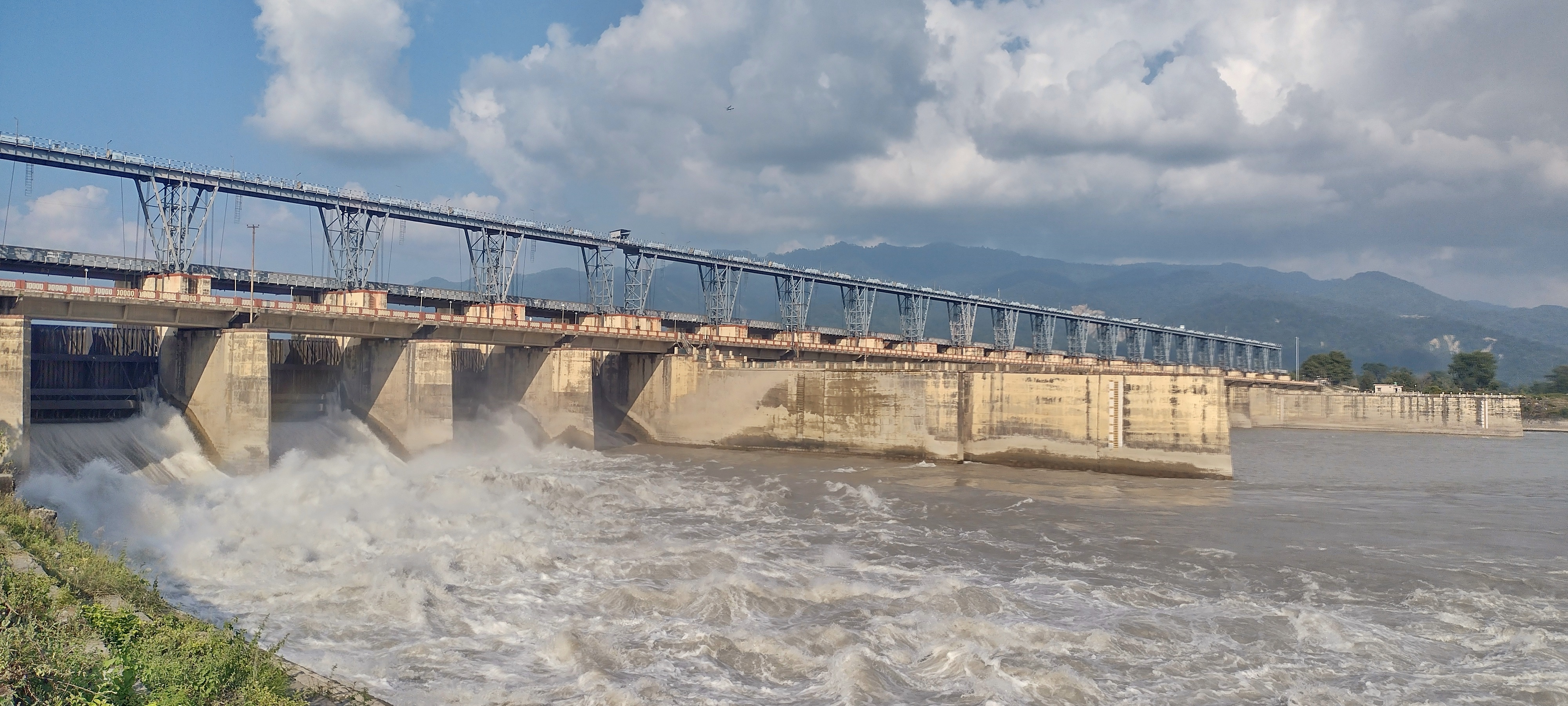
- Clockwise from top : Himalayan view from Lohaghat, Advaita Ashrama, view of Champawat, Tanakpur Dam, Abbott Mount church and Baleshwar Temple
- Interactive map of Champawat district
- Coordinates: 29.33°N 80.10°E
- Country: India
- State: Uttarakhand
- Division: Kumaon
- Headquarters: Champawat

Government
  - District collector: Manish Kumar IAS

Area
  - Total: 1,765.78 km^{2} (681.77 sq mi)

Population
  - Total: 259,648
  - Density: 126/km^{2} (330/sq mi)

Languages
  - Official: Hindi
  - Native: Kumaoni

Languages
- Time zone: UTC+05:30 (IST)
- Postal code: 262523
- Vehicle registration: UK 03
- Website: champawat.nic.in

Champawat district is a district of Uttarakhand state in northern India. The town of Champawat is the administrative headquarters. The district is divided into five tehsils: Barakot, Lohaghat, Pati, Purnagiri, and Champawat. There are 2 Sub Tehsils: Pulla and Munch. The largest and the main city of the district is Tanakpur. Prominent settlements in the district include Dhaun.

Champawat district is part of the eastern Kumaon division of Uttarakhand. It is bounded on the north by Pithoragarh district, on the east by Nepal, on the south by Udham Singh Nagar district, on the west by Nainital district, and on the northwest by Almora district.

As of 2011 it is the second least populous of the 13 districts of Uttarakhand, after Rudraprayag.

== Economy ==
In 2006 the Ministry of Panchayati Raj named Champawat one of the country's 250 most backward districts (out of a total of 640 districts). It is one of the three districts in Uttarakhand currently receiving funds from the Backward Regions Grant Fund Programme (BRGF).

== Assembly Constituencies ==
1. Lohaghat
2. Champawat

== Demographics ==
According to the 2011 census, Champawat district has a population of 259,648 roughly equal to the nation of Vanuatu. This gives it a ranking of 579th among the 640 districts of India. The district has a population density of 147 inhabitants per square kilometre (380/sq mi). Its population growth rate over the decade 2001–2011 was 15.63%. Champawat district has a sex ratio of 980 females for every 1000 males, and a literacy rate of 79.83%. Scheduled Castes and Scheduled Tribes make up 18.25% and 0.52% of the population respectively.

Religions in Champawat district (2011)
Religion	Percent
Hinduism	96.12%
Islam	3.35%
Other or not stated	0.53%
Distribution of religions

As of the 2001 Indian census, the Champawat district had a population of 224,542, including 216,646 Hindus (96.5%), 6,642 (3.0%) Muslims, and 626 (0.3%) Christians.

Languages of Champawat district (2011)
1. Kumaoni (78.2%)
2. Hindi (19.4%)
3. Others (2.46%)

The major spoken language by of the district is Kumaoni.

Champawat district: mother-tongue of population, according to the 2011 Indian Census.
Mother tongue code	Mother tongue	People	Percentage
002007	Bengali	519	0.2%
006102	Bhojpuri	462	0.2%
006195	Garhwali	561	0.2%
006240	Hindi	50,254	19.4%
006340	Kumauni	203,022	78.2%
006439	Pahari	193	0.1%
006489	Rajasthani	145	0.1%
014011	Nepali	1,266	0.5%
016038	Punjabi	378	0.1%
022015	Urdu	1,474	0.6%
–	Others	1,374	0.5%
Total		259,648	100.0%

Historical population
Year	Pop.	±% p.a.
1901	39,902	—
1911	45,196	+1.25%
1921	44,606	−0.13%
1931	48,514	+0.84%
1941	56,462	+1.53%
1951	63,640	+1.20%
1961	83,080	+2.70%
1971	120,525	+3.79%
1981	151,072	+2.28%
1991	190,929	+2.37%
2001	224,542	+1.63%
2011	259,648	+1.46%

== See also ==
- Jhirkuni, village in Barakot Tahsil
