= Uttarakhand Transport Corporation =

Public transport operator in Uttarakhand, India

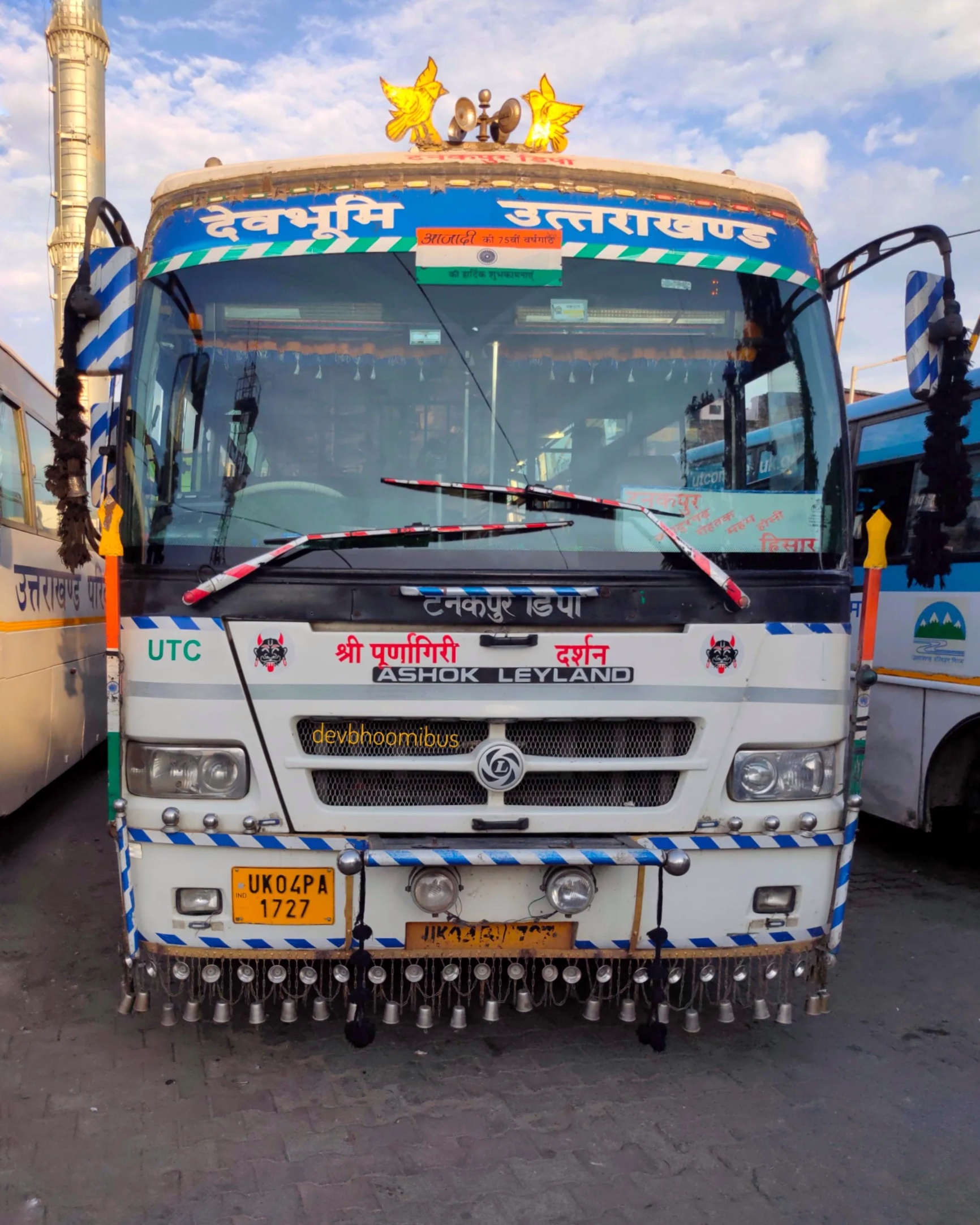
- Parent: Government of Uttarakhand
- Founded: 30 October 2003
- Headquarters: 2nd FLOOR PARIVAHAN BHAWAN, KULAHAN SAHASTRADHARA ROAD 248013, DEHRADUN, UTTARAKHAND, India
- Locale: Uttarakhand
- Service area: Uttarakhand, Himachal Pradesh, Chandigarh, Punjab, Haryana, Delhi and Uttar Pradesh
- Service type: Bus service
- Routes: 400+
- Depots: 19
- Fleet: 1345+
- Fuel type: Diesel, Electric & CNG
- Operator: Government of Uttarakhand
- Website: https://utconline.uk.gov.in/

Uttarakhand Transport Corporation (UTC) is the public sector passenger road transport corporation of the state of Uttarakhand, India. Commonly referred to as Uttarakhand Roadways, it provides essential connectivity across the hilly terrain of the state and facilitates inter-state travel to neighboring regions.
The corporation operates an extensive network covering approximately 387,000 kilometers and catering to over 120,000 passengers daily. Its primary operations connect major towns within Uttarakhand while extending services to Delhi, Chandigarh, and the states of Himachal Pradesh, Uttar Pradesh, Punjab, Haryana, and Rajasthan.
The mission of UTC is to provide adequate, efficient, well-coordinated, and economical transportation services. As an autonomous body, it focuses on self-sustenance and modernizing its infrastructure to enhance passenger comfort and safety.

== History ==
Following the formation of Uttarakhand on 9 November 2000, the Uttarakhand Transport Corporation (UTC) was established on 30 October 2003 under the Road Transport Act, 1950. At the time of its formation, the corporation inherited 957 buses along with the existing administrative structure from the Uttar Pradesh State Road Transport Corporation (UPSRTC).

== Administrative Structure ==
The corporation is headquartered in Dehradun. To manage operations effectively across the state's diverse terrain, UTC is organized into three functional divisions: Dehradun, Haldwani (Nainital), and Tanakpur. Each division operates a regional workshop dedicated to maintenance, heavy repairs, and technical inspections to ensure the safety of the fleet.

== Divisions and bus depots ==
UTC has 3 divisions and 19 bus depots.

Divisions	Depots
Tanakpur	Lohaghat, Pithoragarh, Tanakpur
Nainital	Almora, Bageshwar, Bhawali, Haldwani, Kathgodam, Kashipur, Ramnagar, Ranikhet, Rudarpur
Dehradun	Dehradun, Dehradun Gramin, Dehradun Hill, Haridwar, Kotdwar, Rishikesh, Roorkee, Srinagar

== Fleet ==
UTC operates a fleet of over 1,345 buses, including around 950 corporation-owned vehicles, while several others run under private contract. Contract-operated buses in the fleet include Volvo, Janrath (A.C.), CNG, and sleeper coaches.

Types of Buses Operated by UTC

- Volvo: Premium long-distance services.
- Janrath (A.C): High-speed, air-conditioned inter-city services.
- Ordinary: The primary mode of transport for hilly and rural areas.
- CNG: Eco-friendly buses primarily serving the NCR and plains.
- Sleeper: Long-distance overnight coaches.
- Low-Floor: Urban transit buses operated under the JNNURM scheme.
- Tempo Traveller: Specialized services operated primarily to connect popular tourist destinations across the state.

== Modes of service delivery ==
- Online booking portal
- Booking counters
- Pathik mobile app
- Authorised Agents
- Common Service Centre

== Awards ==
Year	Type of Trophy Awarded
2008-09
2008-09	Highest bus productivity in mountainous services.
2008-09	Highest improvement in bus productivity in hilly areas.
2008-09	Highest tire lifespan in mountainous areas.
2008-09	Highest diesel average in hilly areas.
2008-09	Highest improvement in diesel average in hilly areas.
2009-10	Highest bus productivity in mountainous services.
2009-10	Highest tire lifespan in mountainous areas.
2009-10	Highest diesel average in hilly areas
2009-10	Minimum operating costs in hilly areas
2010-11	Highest tire life span in mountainous areas
2010-11	Highest diesel average in hilly areas
2010-11	Minimum operating costs in hilly areas
2010-11	Minimum accident rate in hilly areas.
2011-12	Award by Transport Minister, Government of India for best road safety in hilly areas.
2011-12	Minimum accident rate in hilly areas.
2011-12	Minimum Operating Cost
2012-13	Highest utility on mountain roads.
2012-13	Highest diesel utilization on mountain routes.
2012-13	Highest diesel average on mountain routes.
2013-14	Bus productivity.
2013-14	Highest tire life span.
2013-14	Highest kilometer (bu).
2013-14	Highest operating.
2014-15	Highest tire life span in mountainous areas
2014-15	Highest tire life span in mountainous areas
2014-15	Highest bus productivity in hilly areas.
2015-16	Maximum improvement in bus productivity compared to last year.
2015-16	Highest tire life span.
2015-16	Minimum operating cost (tax free)
2015-16	Maximum improvement in diesel average.
2015-16	Highest performance in bus productivity.
2015-16	Maximum diesel average.
2016-17	Highest productivity of mountain services.
2016-17	Highest tire life span in mountain services.
2016-17	Minimum operating costs on mountain routes.
2019-20	Minimum accidents on mountain roads.
2020-21	Minimum accidents on mountain roads.

== Photo gallery ==
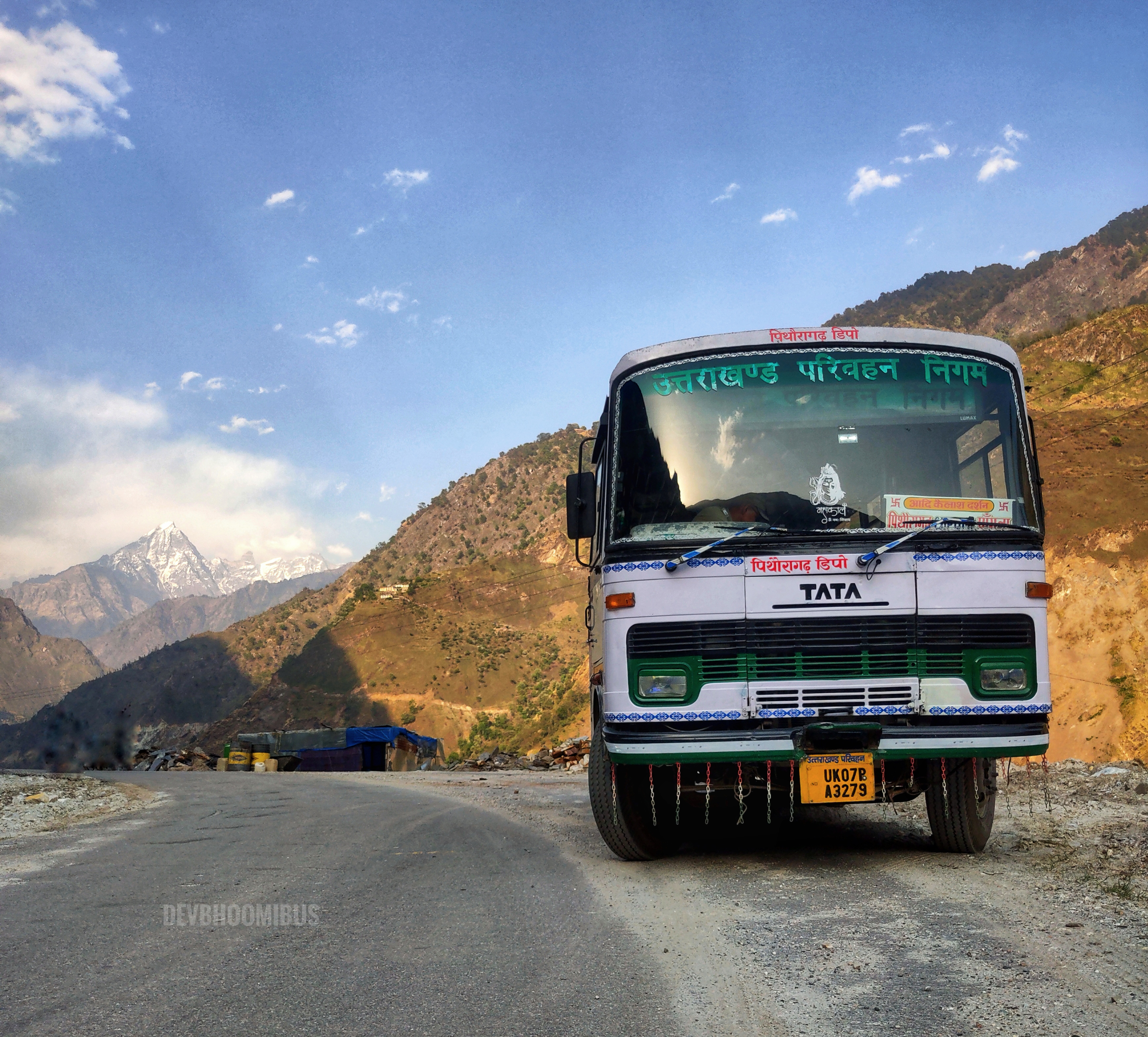

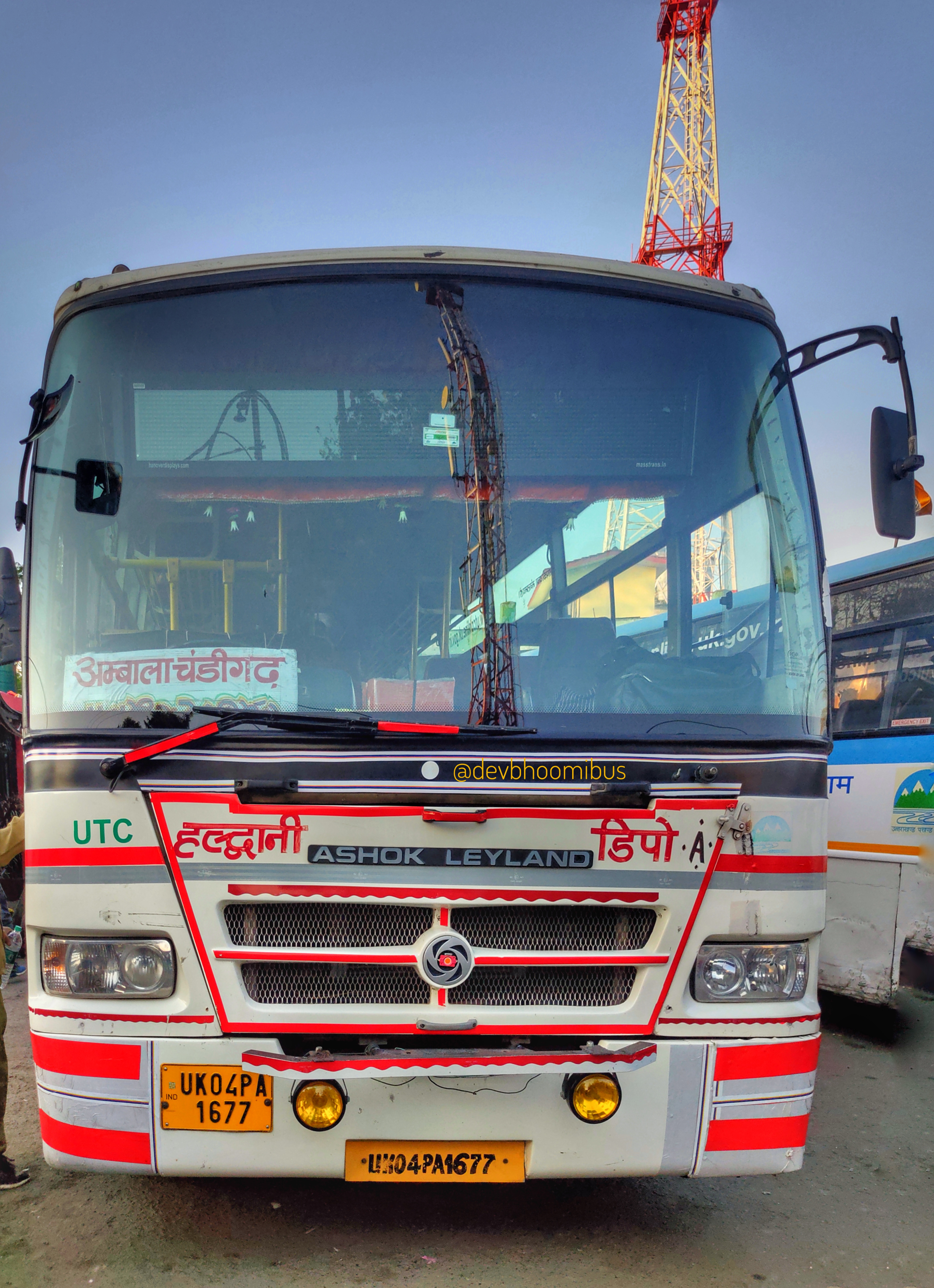

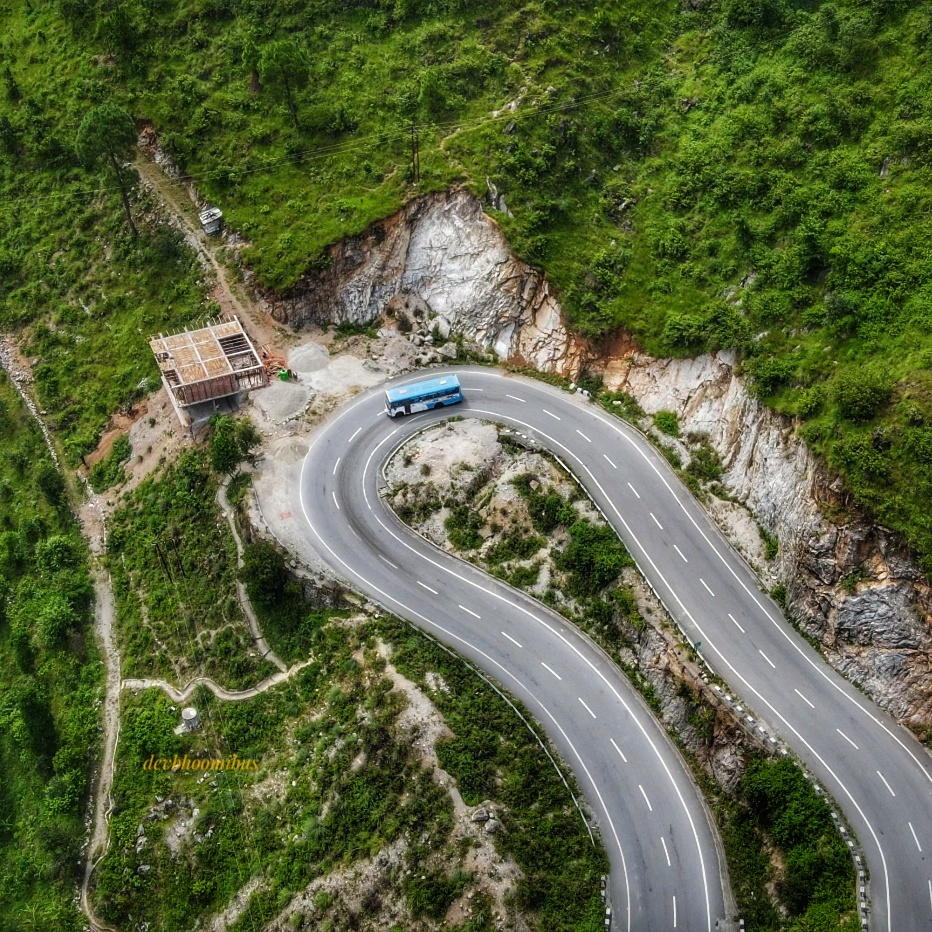

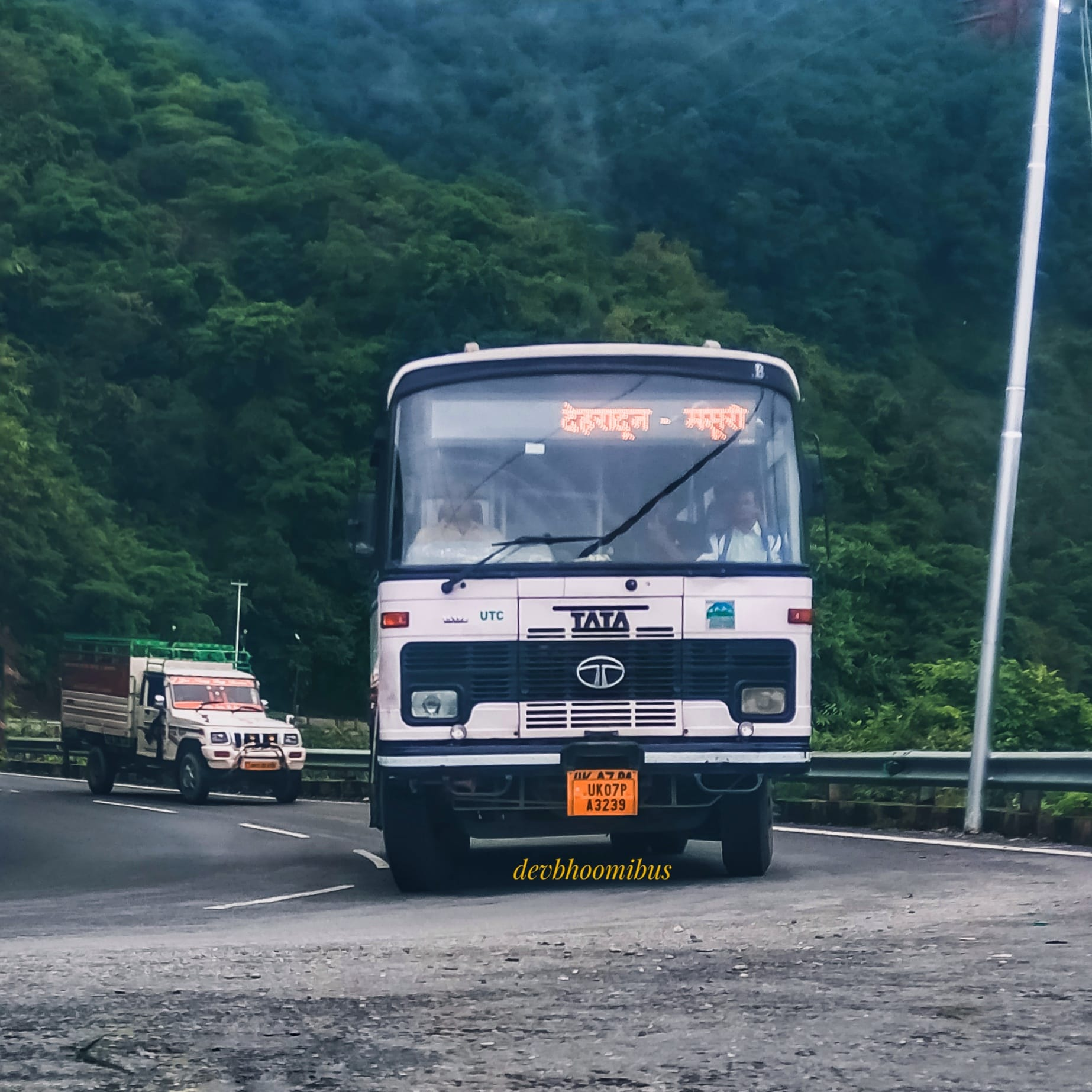

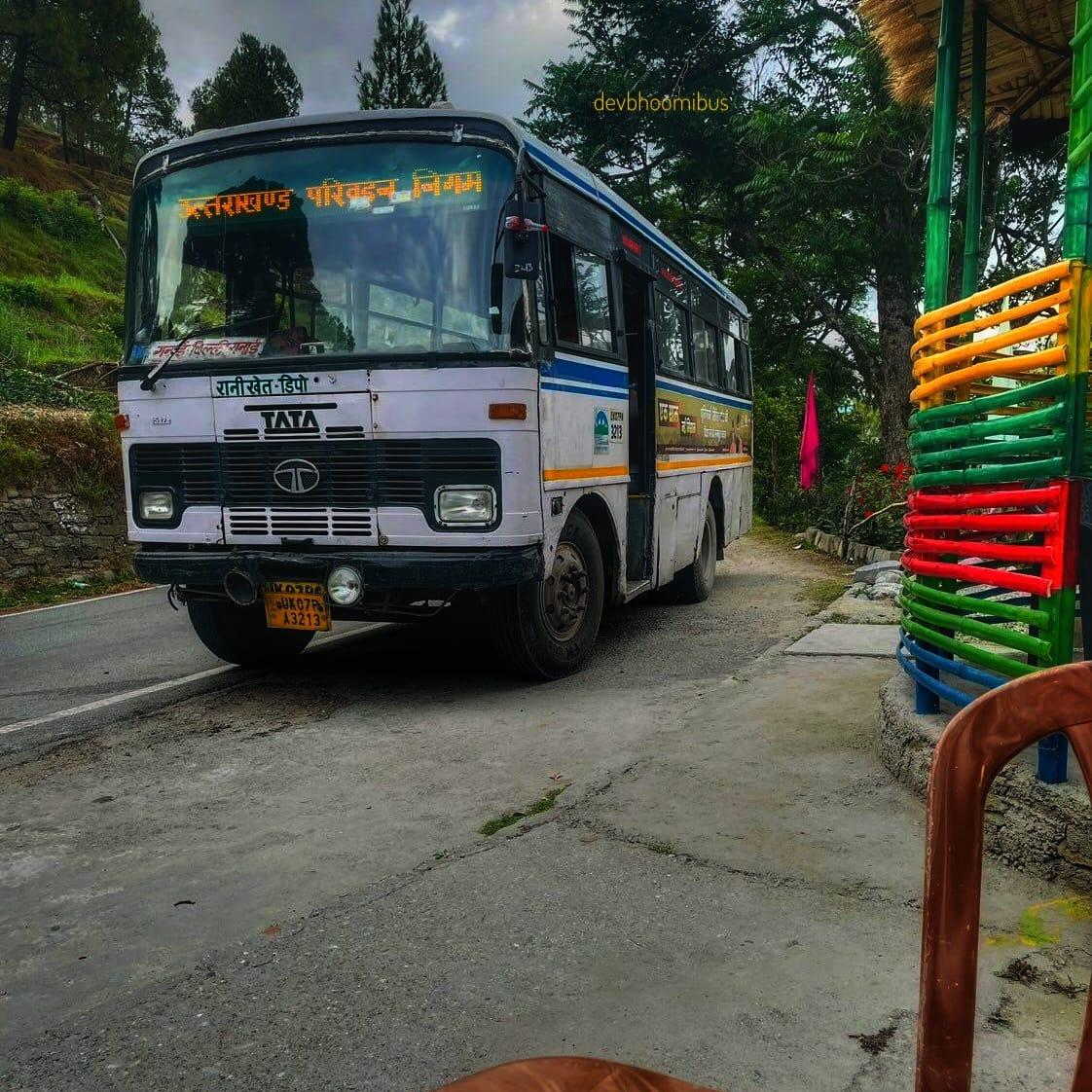

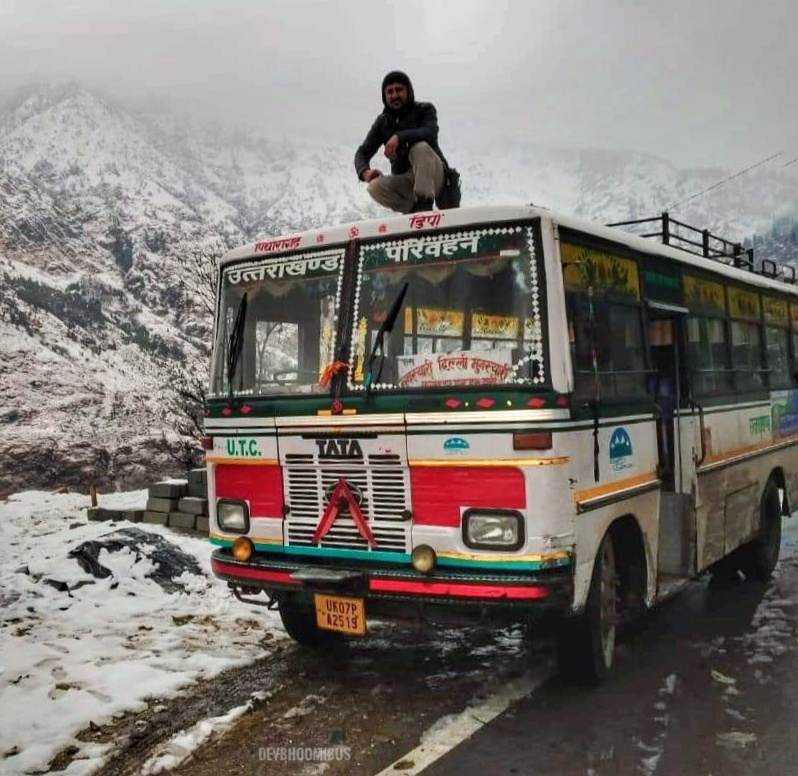

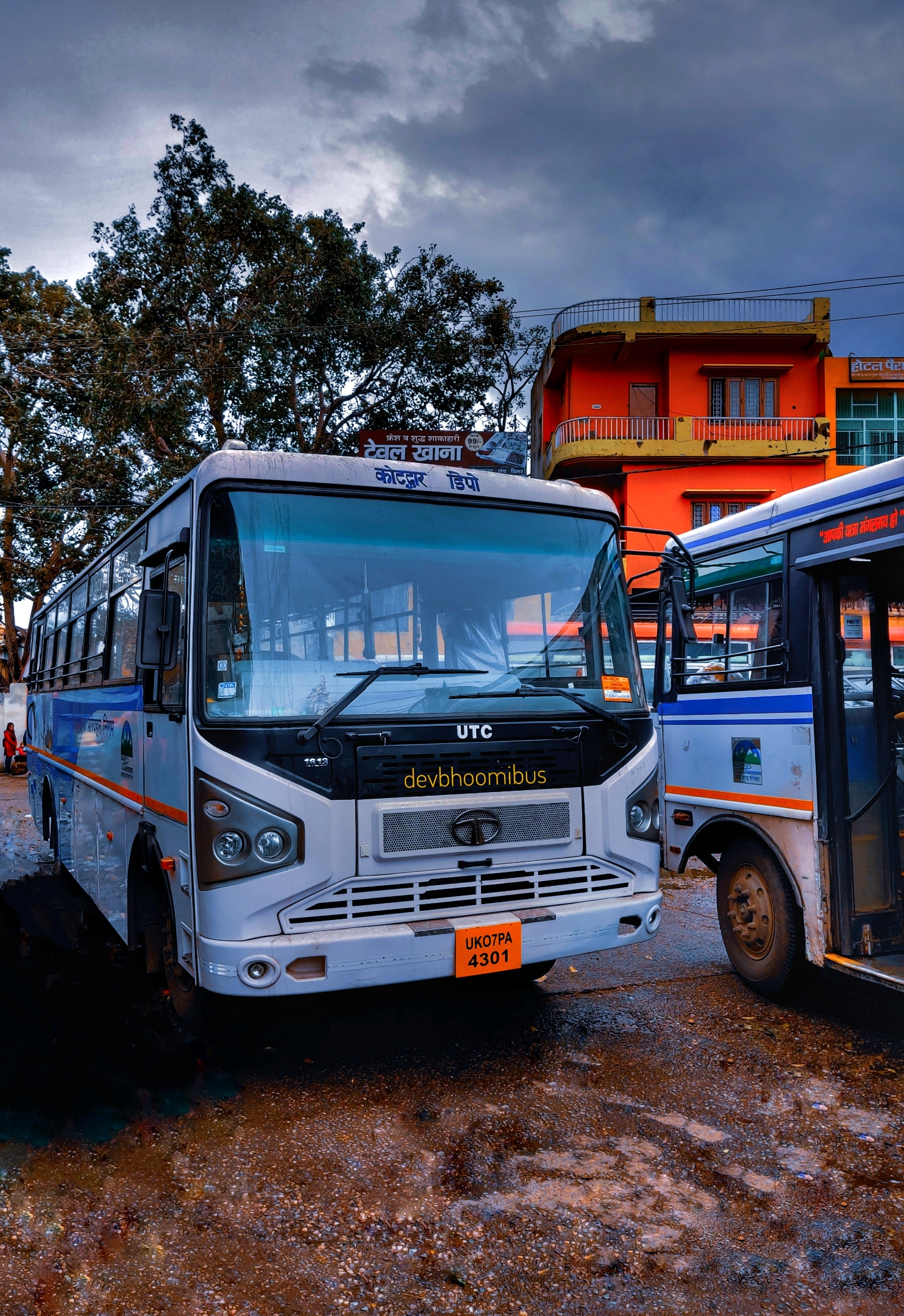

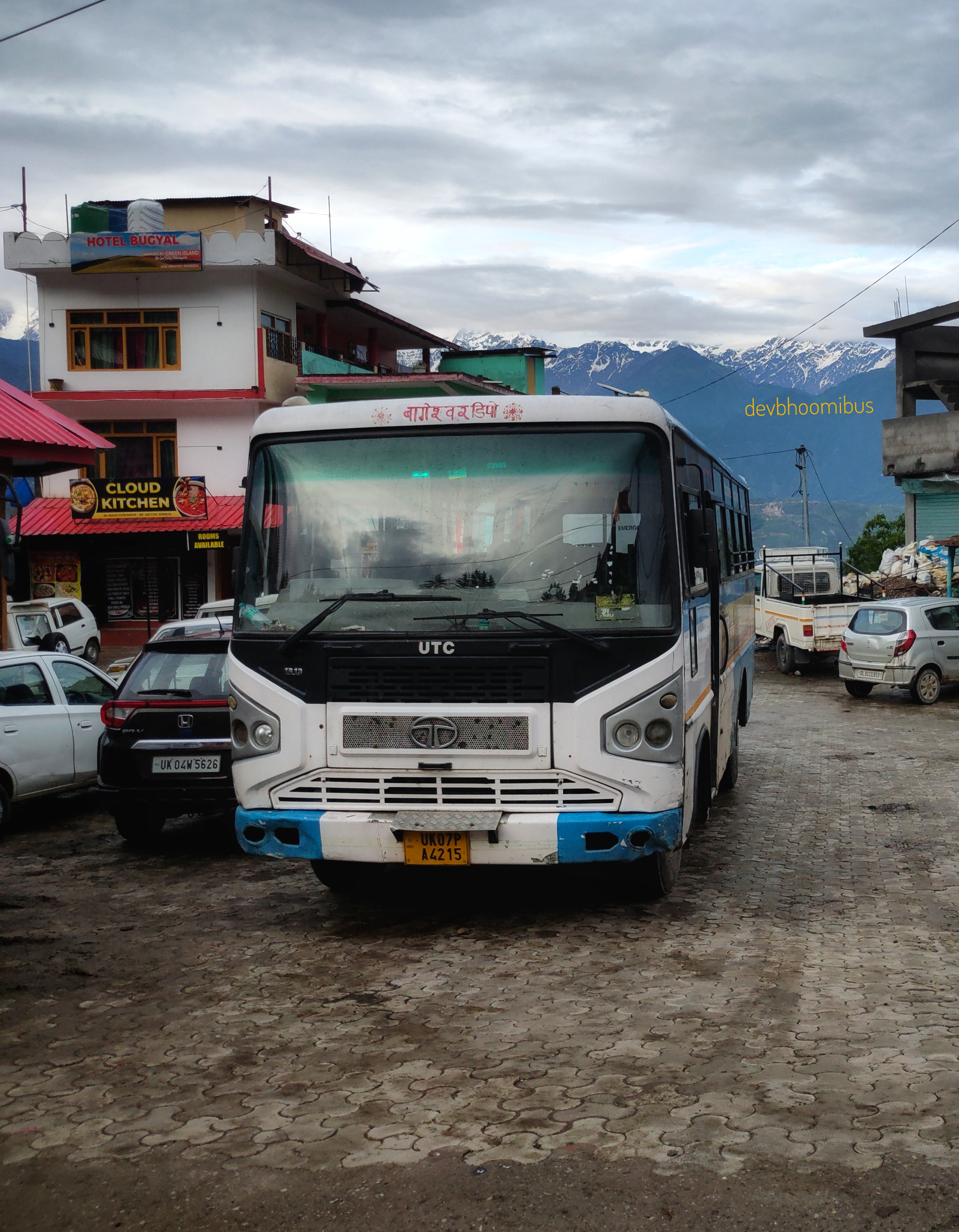

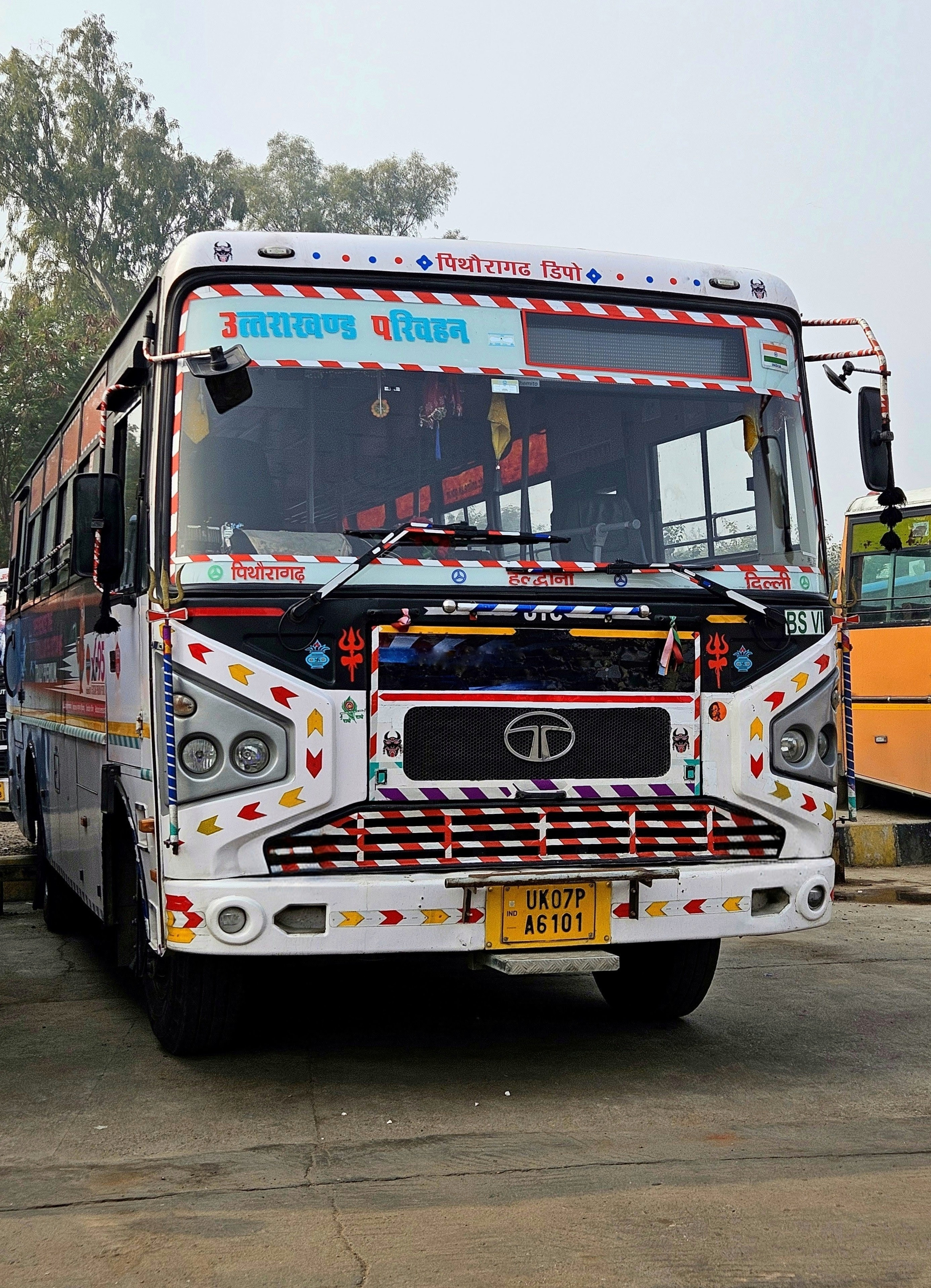

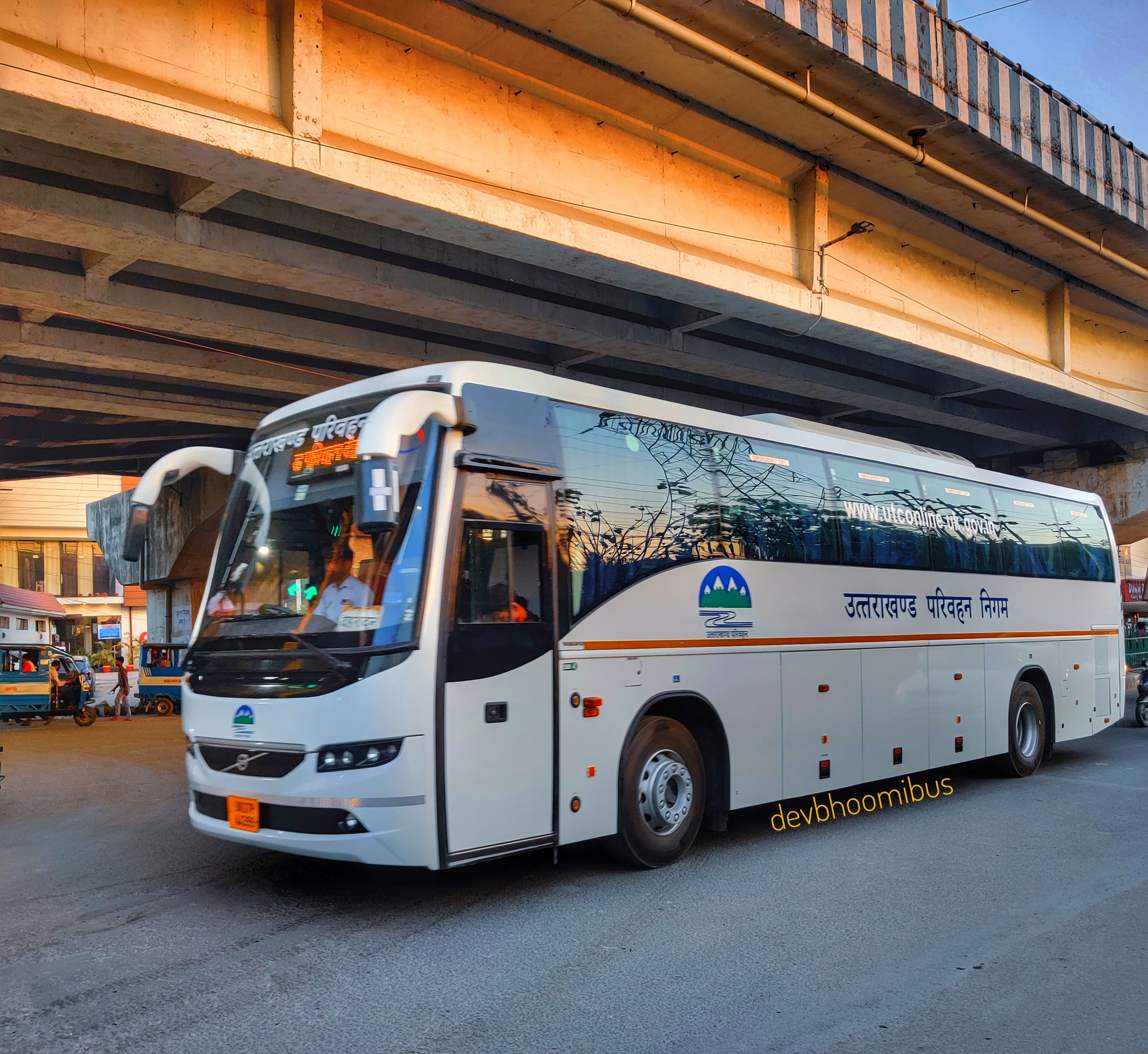

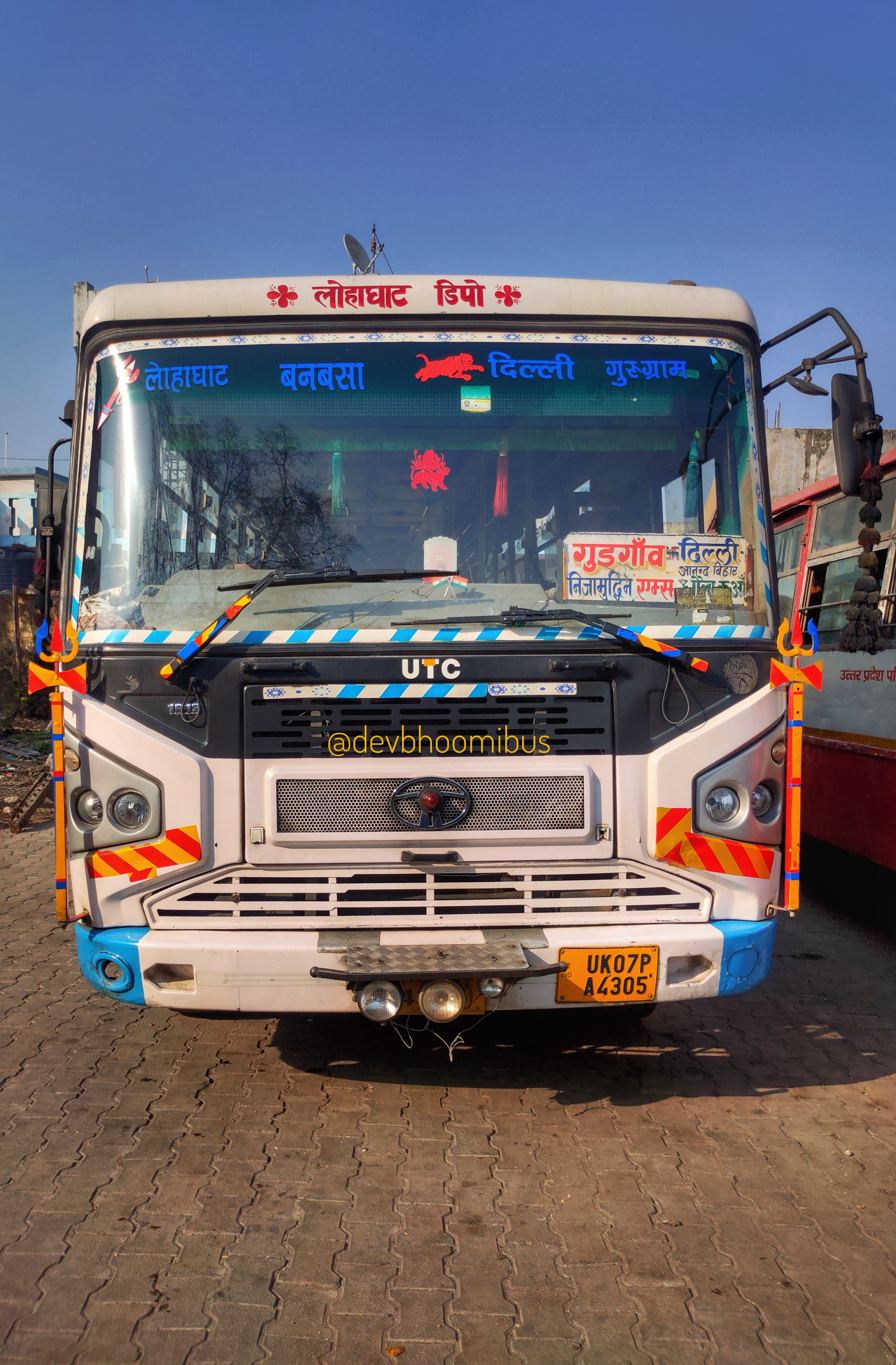

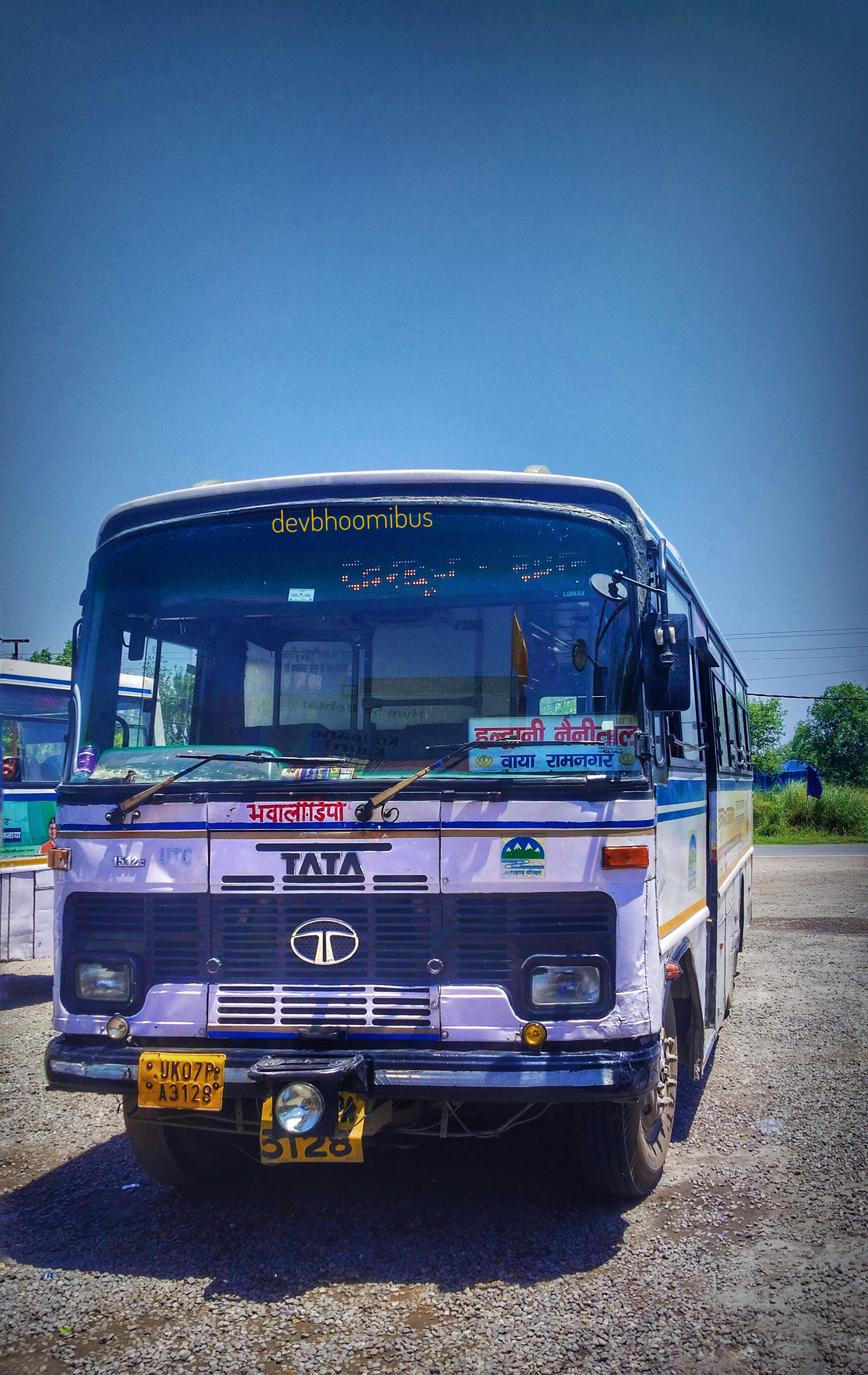

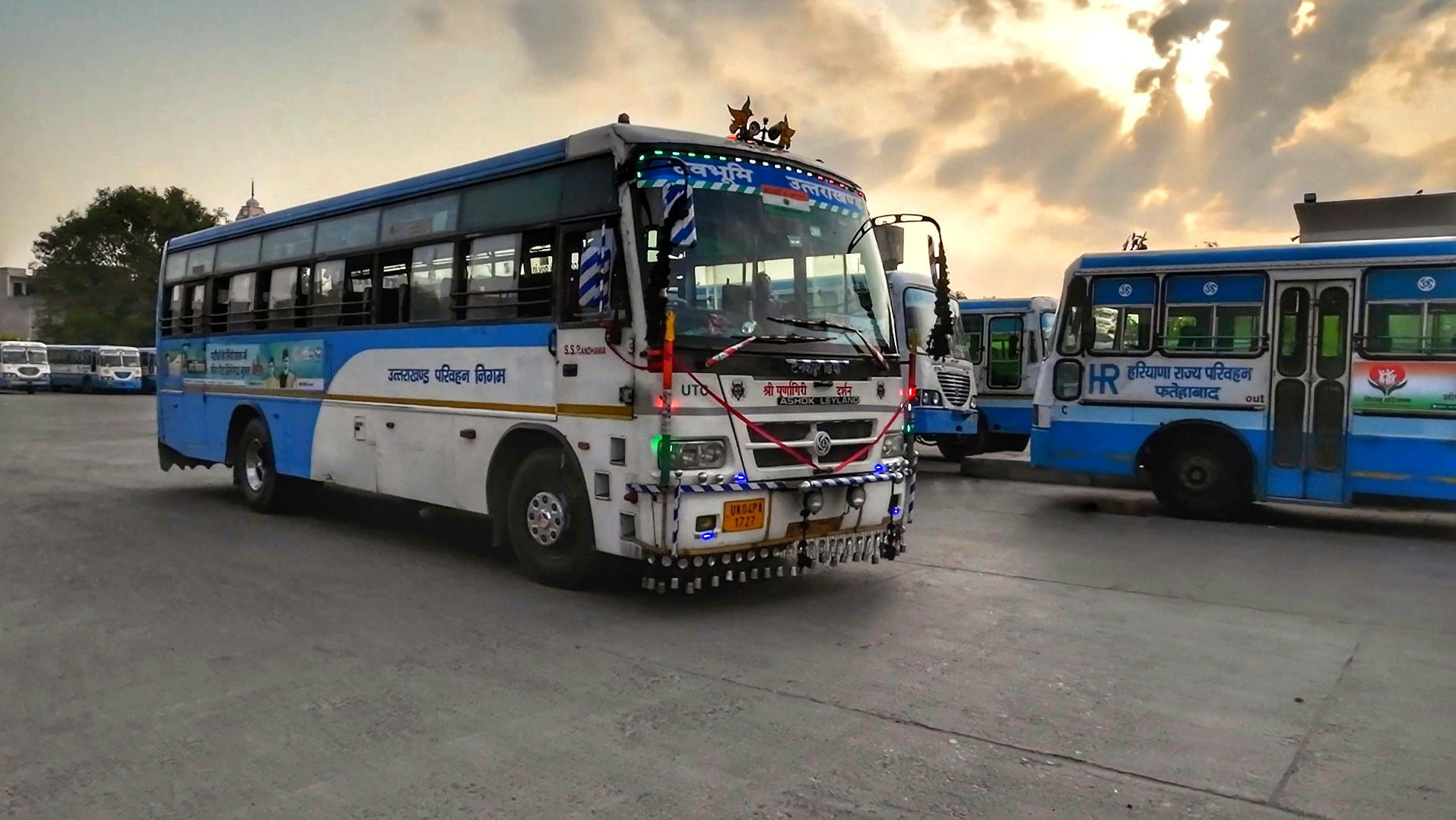

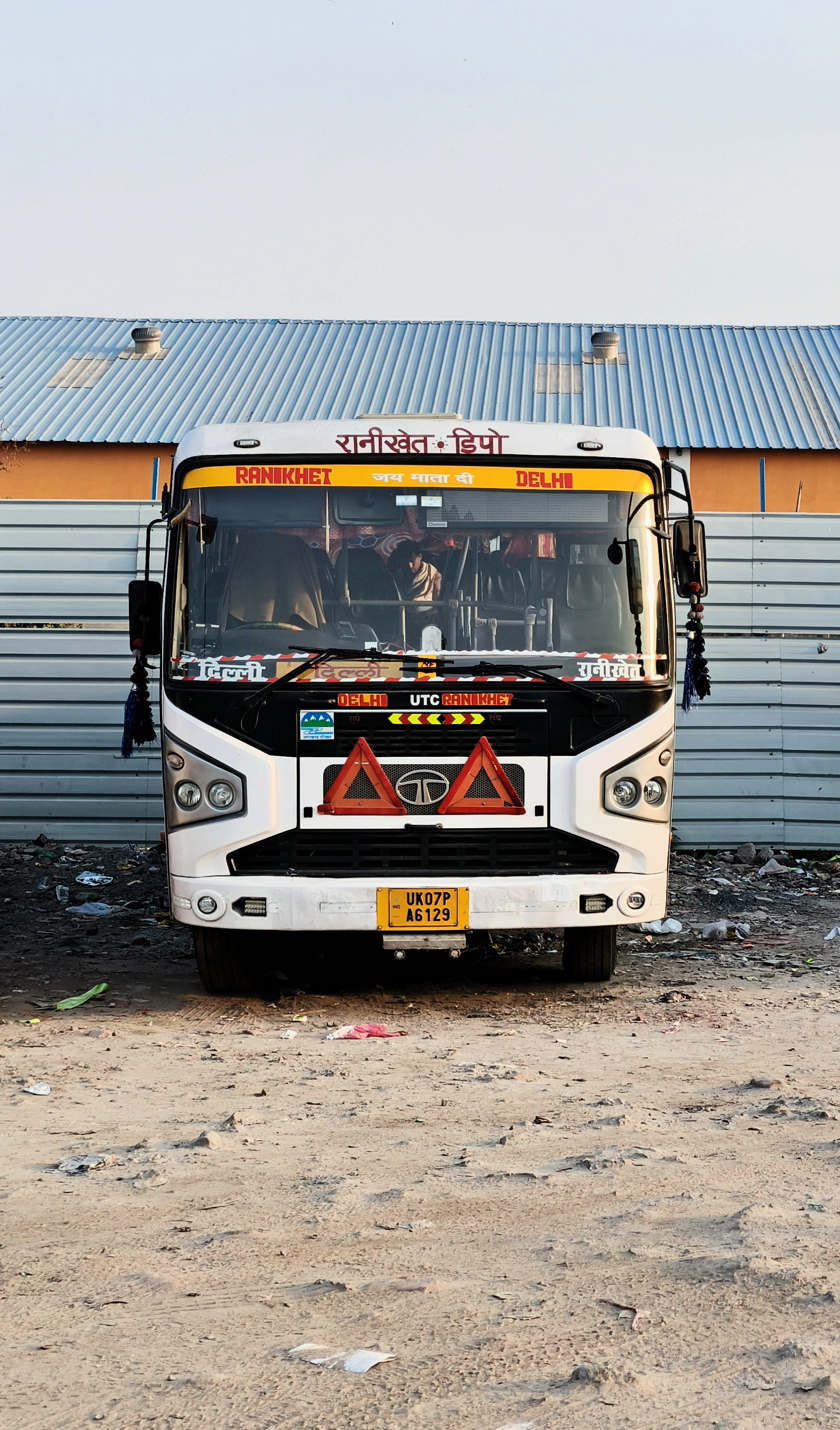

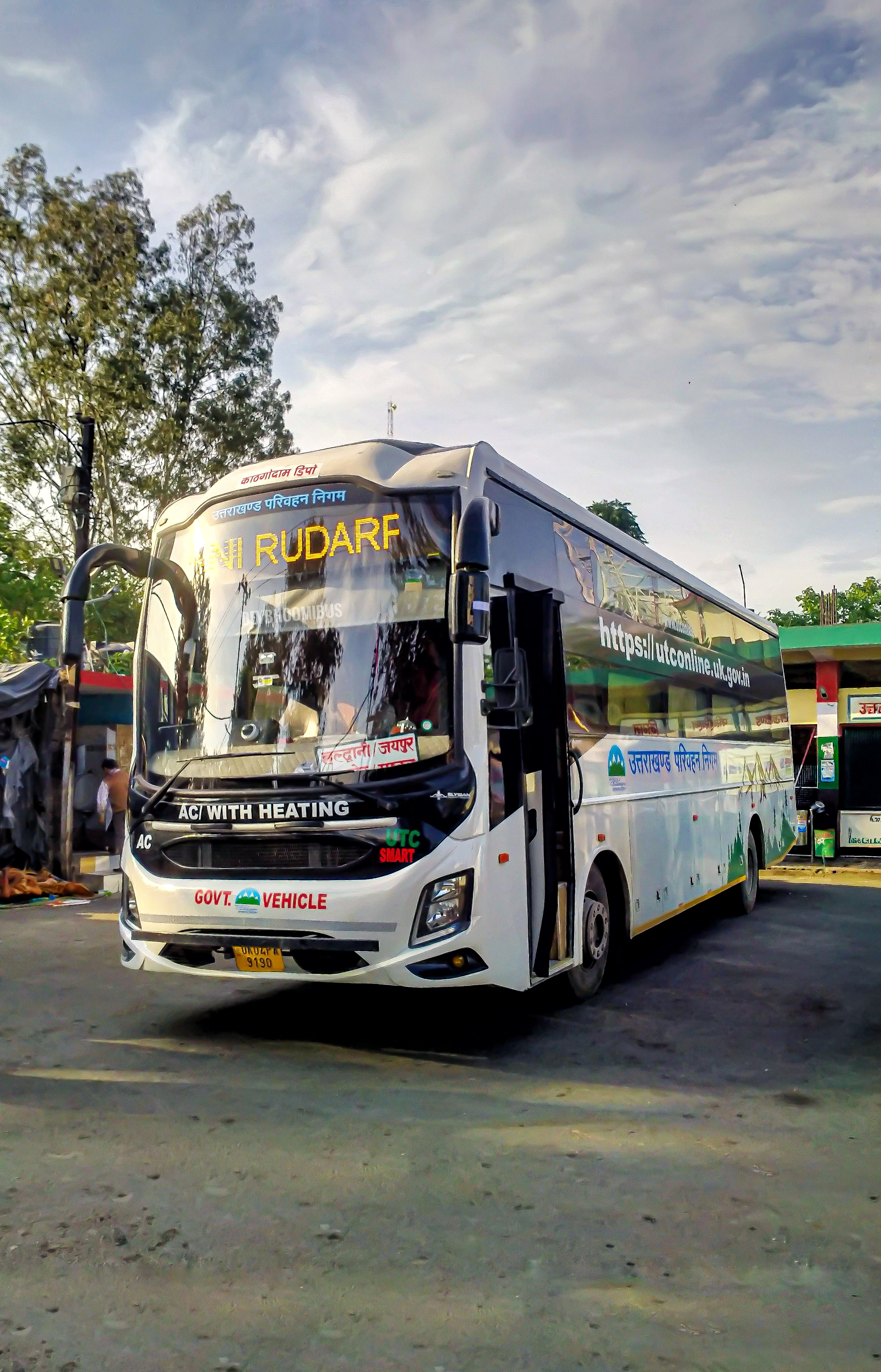

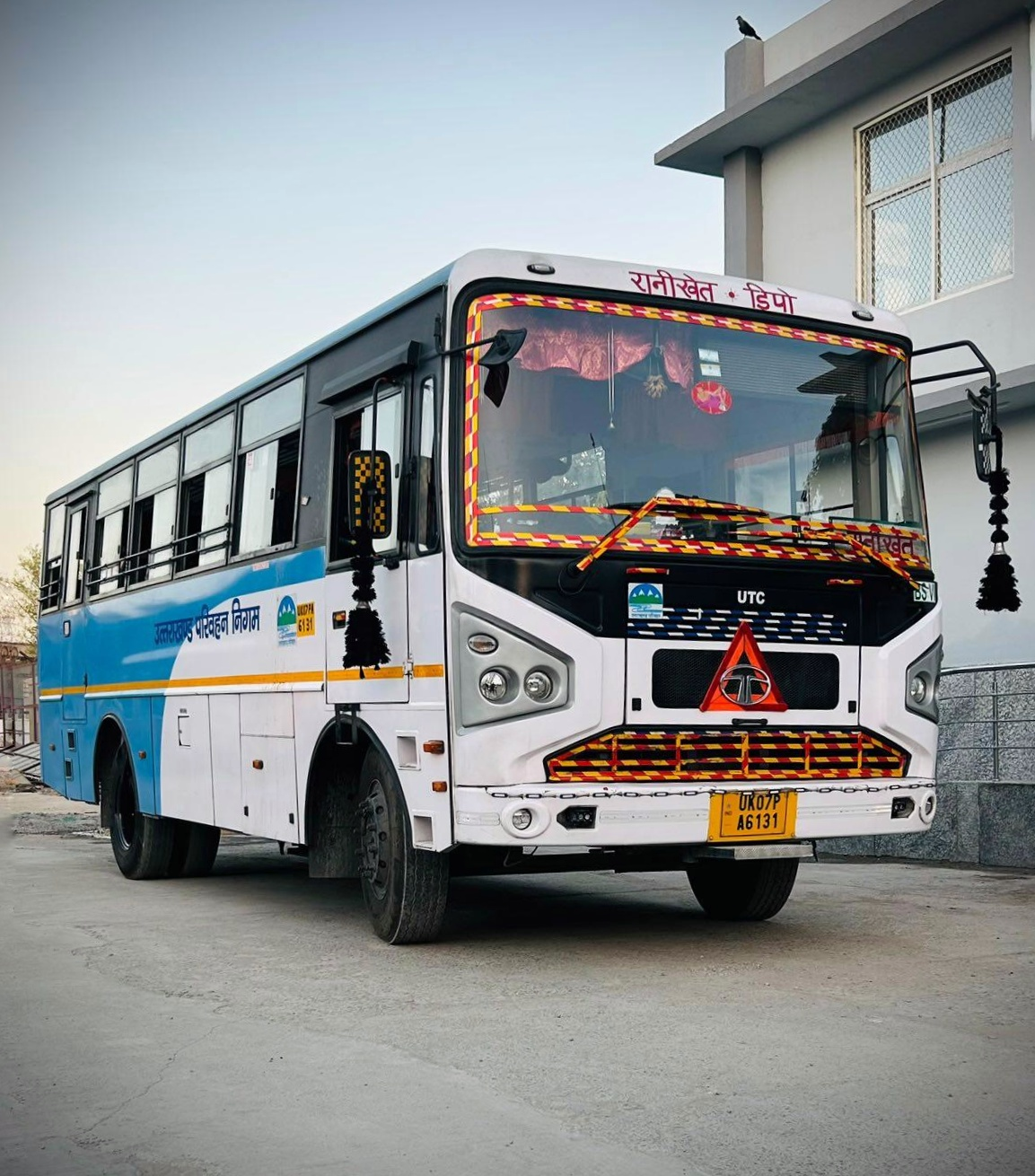

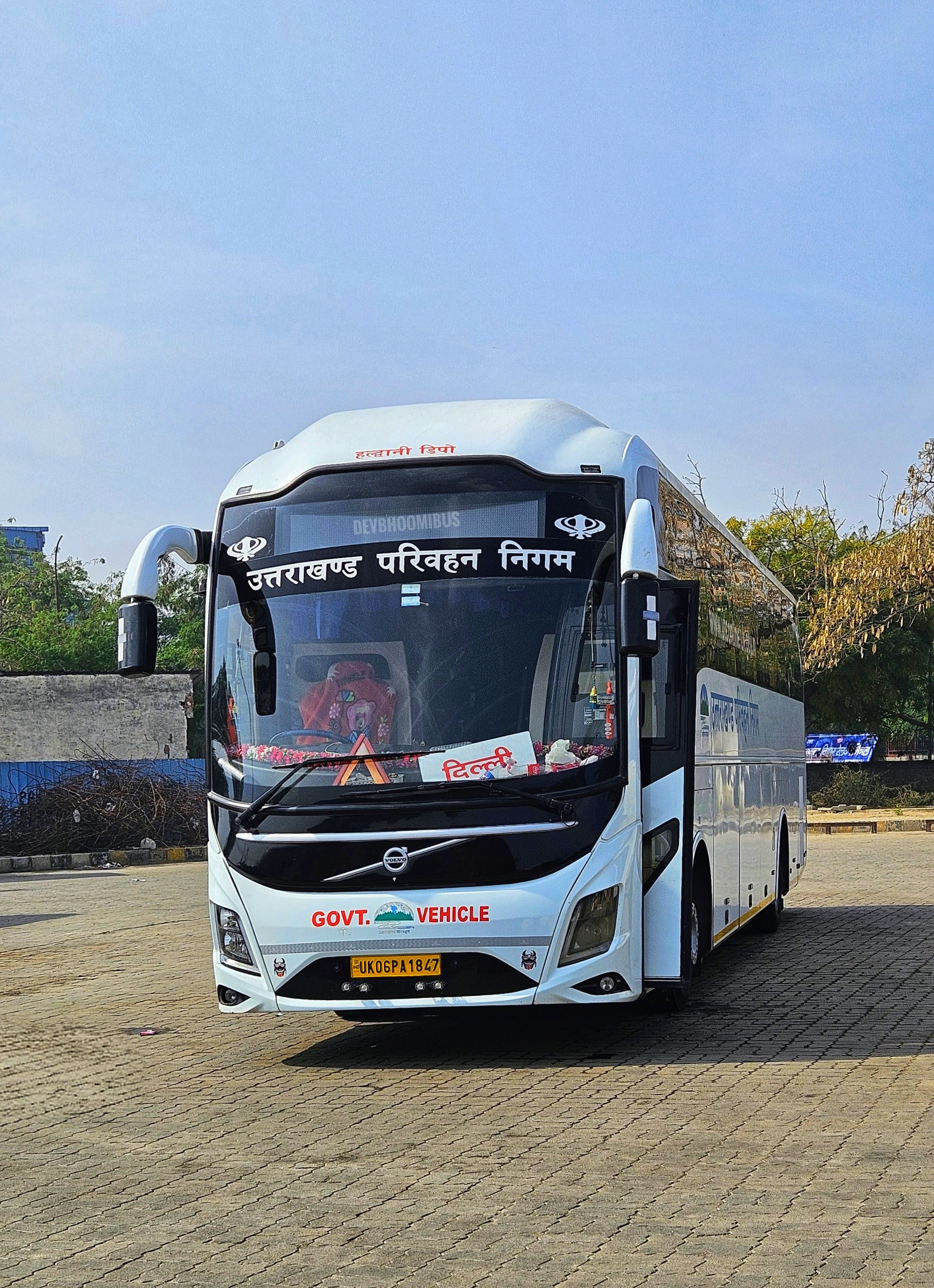

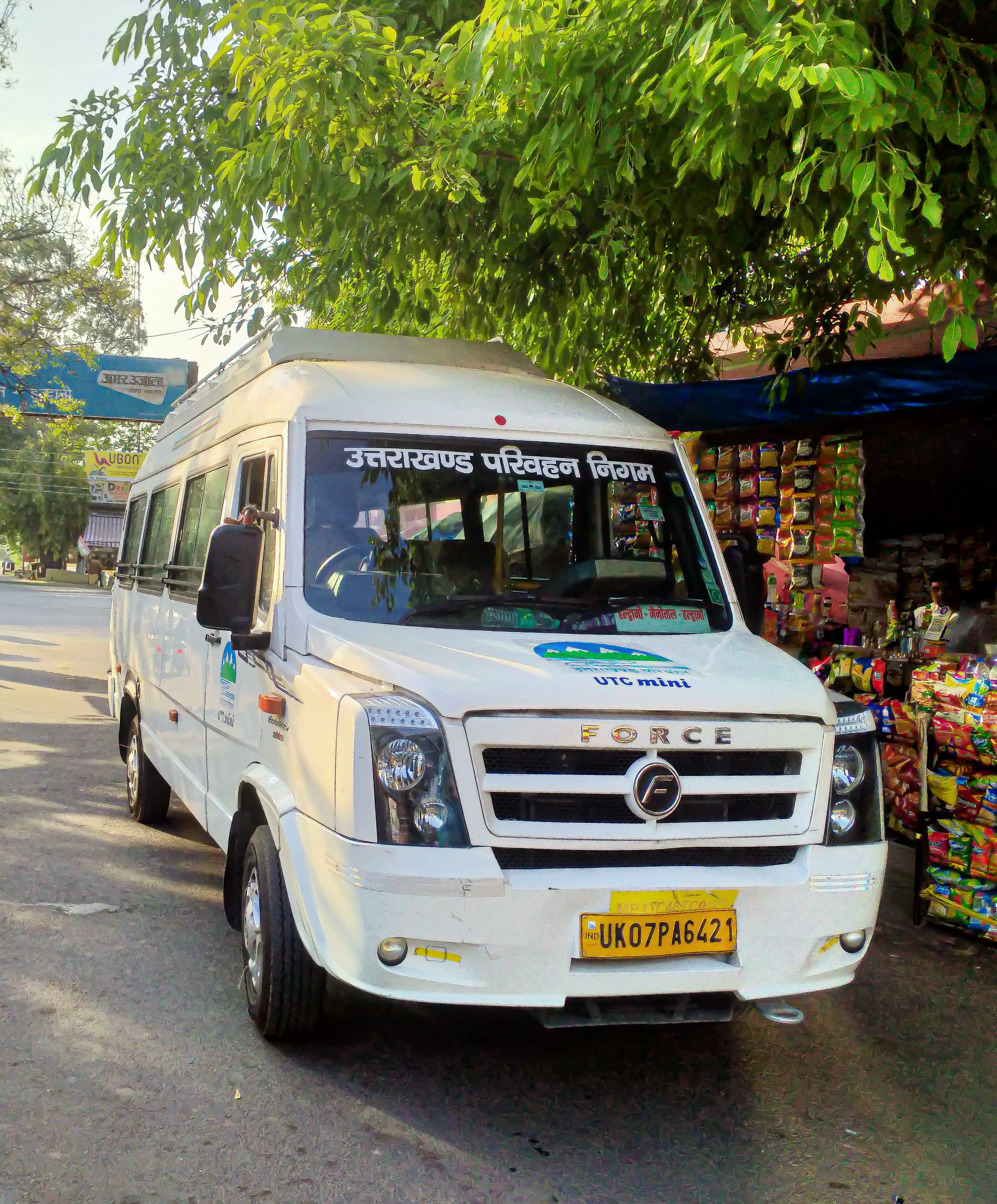
