= List of Kumaoni people =

Kumaonis are people from the Kumaon, a region in the Indian Republic that forms part of the Himalayas.

== Historical figures ==
- Vasudev Katyuri (Kumaoni: वासुदेव कत्यूरी) was the founder and the emperor of the Katyuri dynasty, based in Kumaon, Garhwal, Nepal, Kashmir, and Afghanistan (Note: The Katyuri dynasty, part of the Solar lineage, ruled a vast region from Nepal to Kabul about 2,500 years ago. Originating in Uttarkoshal, they later formed a distinct kingdom in Kumaon. Known for their influence, they possibly ruled before or after the Khasa kings, with Kanakdeva being a notable ruler.) in the Indian subcontinent.
- Baz Bahadur Chand, (Kumaoni: बाज़ बहादुर चंद; 1598 - 1680), born Baz Gusain (बाज़ गुसाईं), was the 50th Maharaja of the Chand Dynasty of Kumaon.
- Udyot Chand (1678–1698) was a king of the Chand dynasty who ruled over the Kumaon Kingdom from 1678 to 1698 CE. After ascending the throne after his father Baz Bahadur Chand
- Gyan Chand (R. 1698–1708) was a king of the Chand dynasty of Kumaon.
- Jagat Chand, (reigned c. 1708-1720) was the Chand king of Kumaon Kingdom. He ascended throne of Kumaon in 1708 CE after his father King Gyan Chand's death.
- Birbal Negi, was a commander in the Kumaon Kingdom.

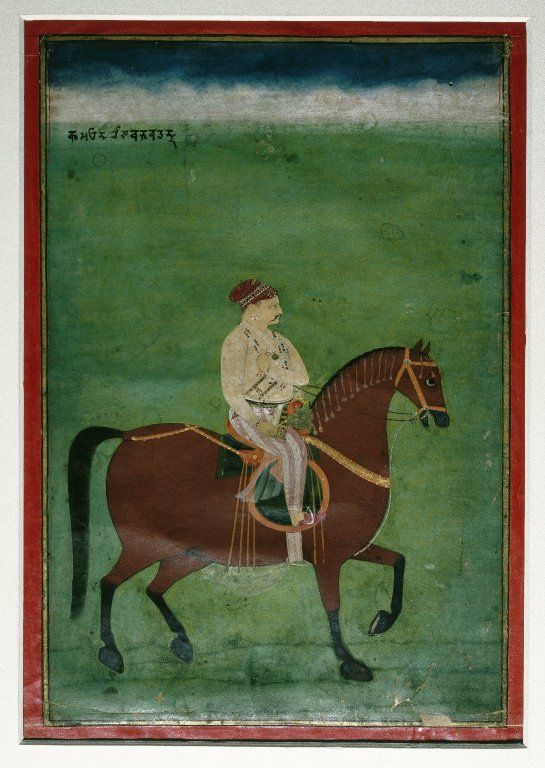
Baz Gusain, 50th Maharaja of the Chand Dynasty of Kumaon

== Administration ==
- Murli Manohar Joshi
- Bhagat Singh Koshyari
- B. D. Pande
- V. C. Pande
- N.D. Tiwari

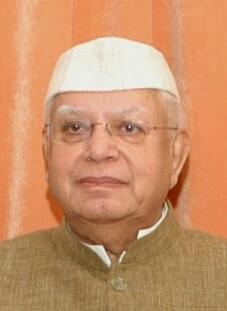
N.D. Tiwari

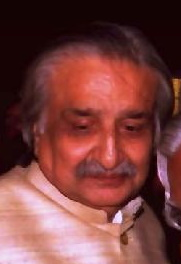
V. C. Pande

== Defence forces ==
- Major Rajesh Singh Adhikari, Mahavir Chakra awardee. Hero Battle of Tololing, Kargil war
- Vice Admiral Harish Bisht, PVSM, AVSM, ADC former Flag Officer of the Indian Navy.
- Lucky Bisht, former Indian spy.
- Bahadur Singh Bohra, Lawanz Operation: 25 Sep 2008, Ashoka Chakra recipient
- Mohan Nath Goswami, Operation : CI & IS Ops, Sep 03, 2015, Ashoka Chakra recipient
- General Bipin Chandra Joshi, 17th Chief of Army Staff (COAS), First Army Chief from Uttarakhand
- Admiral Devendra Kumar Joshi 21st Chief of Naval Staff of the Indian Navy
- Captain Ummed Singh Mahra, Operation : Op Orchid, 6 July 1971, Ashoka Chakra recipient
- Mohan Chand Sharma, Batla House Encounter, 19 September 2008, Ashoka Chakra recipient

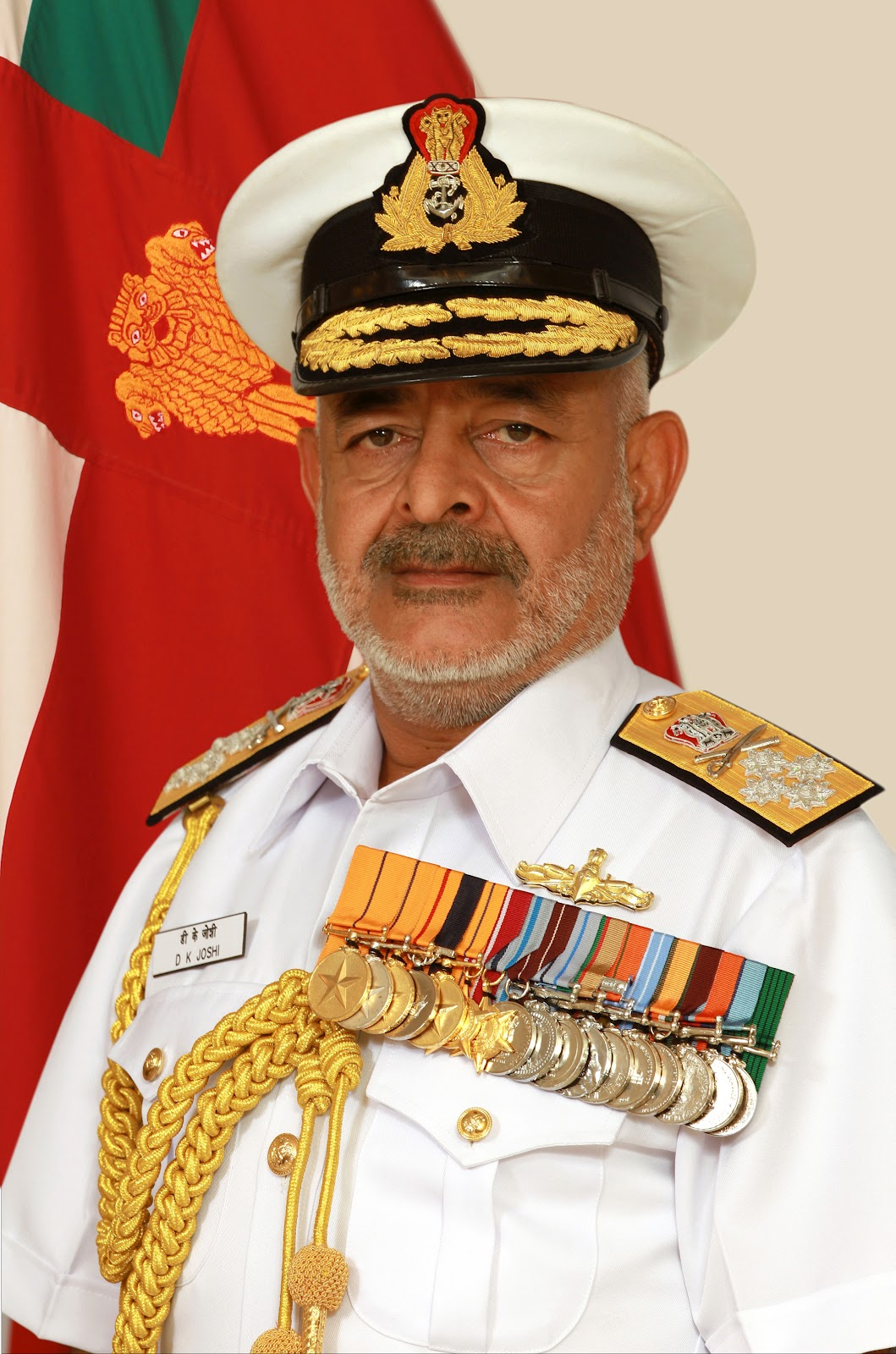
Devendra Kumar Joshi, the 14th Lieutenant Governor of Andaman and Nicobar Islands

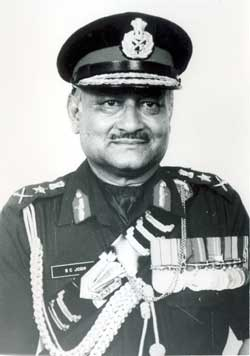
Bipin Chandra Joshi, 16th Chief of Army Staff (COAS) of the Indian Army

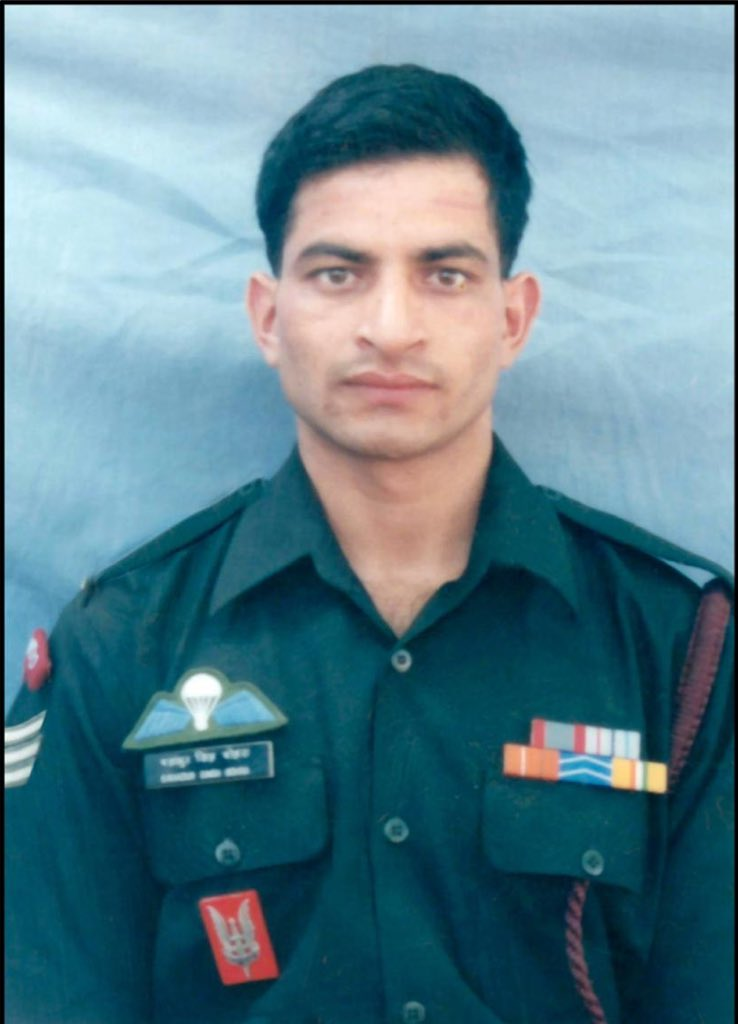
Bahadur Singh Bohra, Lawanz Operation: 25 Sep 2008, Ashoka Chakra recipient

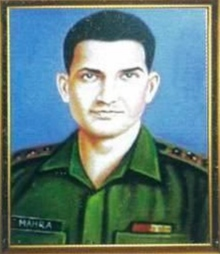
Captain Ummed Singh Mahra, Operation : Op Orchid, 6 July 1971, Ashoka Chakra recipient

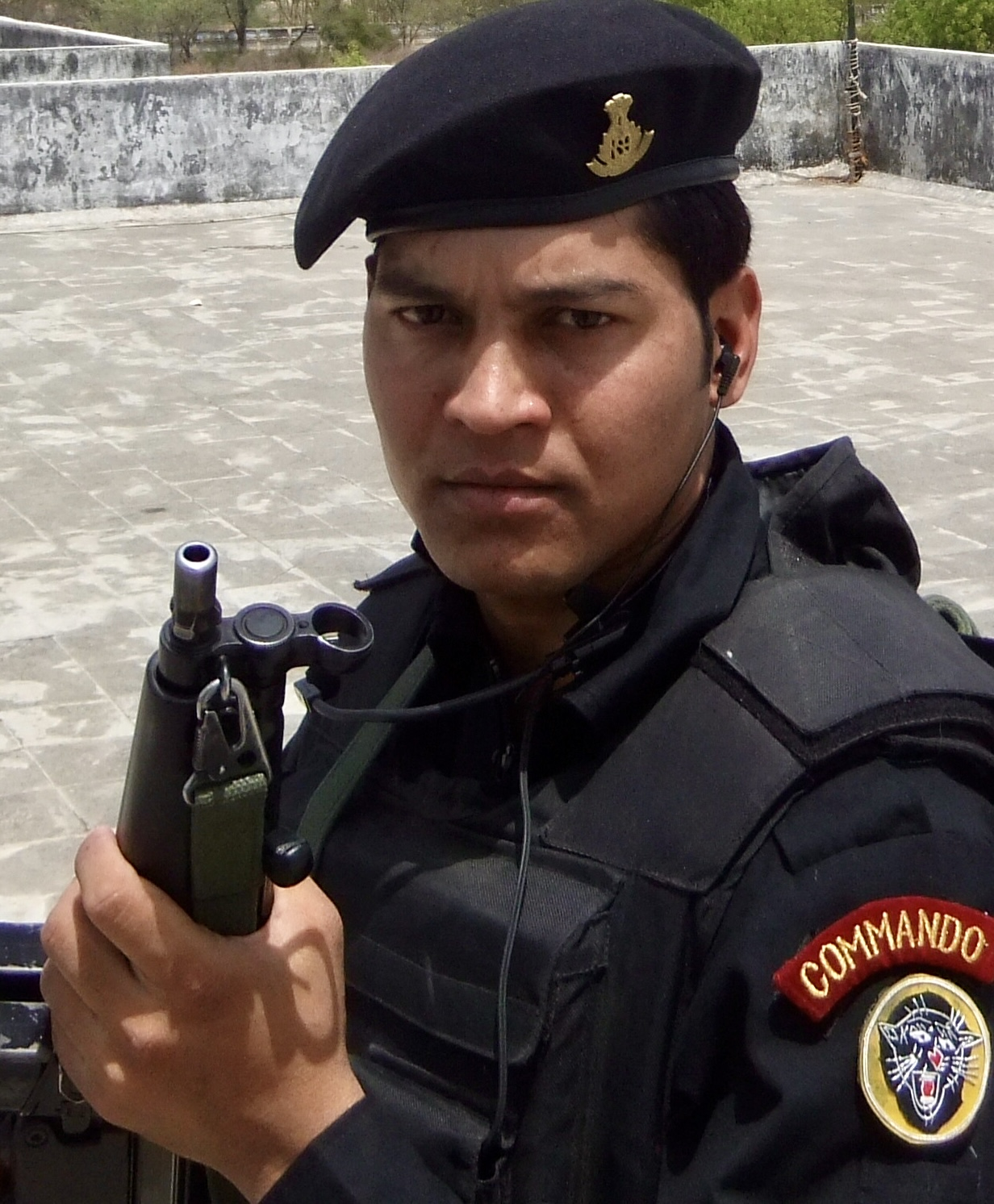
Lucky Bisht, former Indian spy

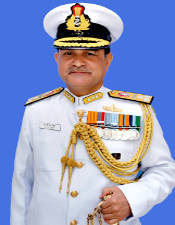
Vice Admiral Harish Bisht

== Politics ==
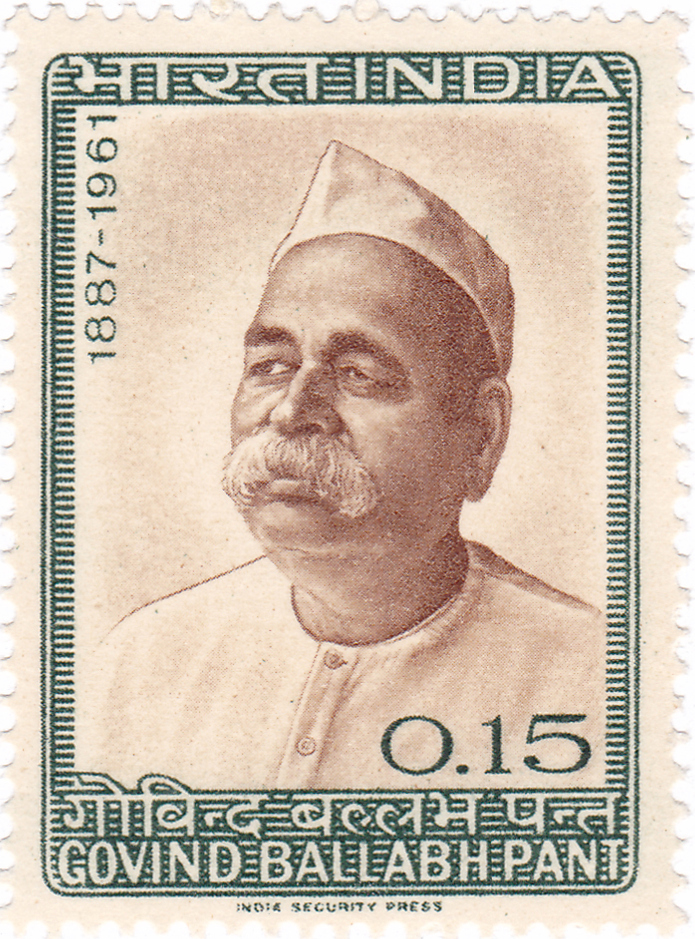
Govind Ballabh Pant

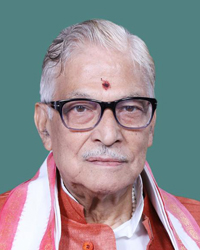
Murli Manohar Joshi

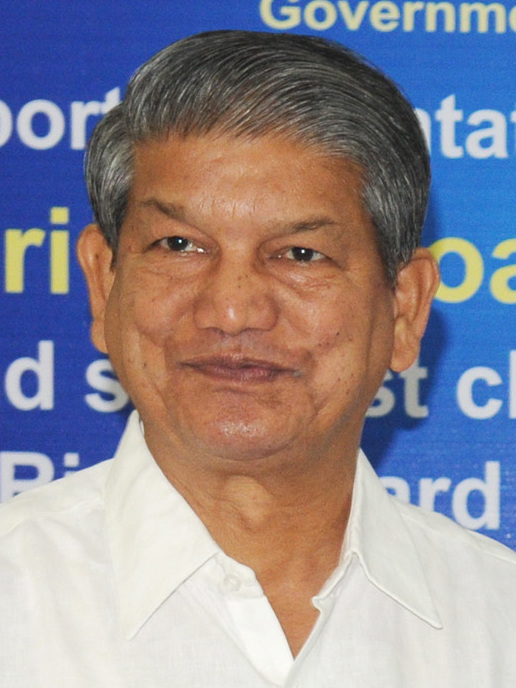
Harish Rawat

- Kashi Singh Airy
- Yashpal Arya
- K. C. Singh Baba
- Mohan Singh Bisht
- Ajay Bhatt
- Ganesh Joshi
- Murli Manohar Joshi, He is a member of the Bharatiya Janata Party (BJP) of which he was the President between 1991 and 1993.
- Puran Chand Joshi, general secretary of the C.P.I. (1935–1947)
- Bhagat Singh Koshyari, governor of Maharashtra, chief minister of Uttarakhand
- Kalu Singh Mahara, freedom fighter, led an anti-British militia in Champawat, during the Indian Rebellion of 1857
- Mahendra Singh Mahra, served as a Member of Parliament, Rajya Sabha from Uttarakhand (April 2012 to April 2018).
- Badri Datt Pandey, He was popularly known as, and remains remembered in the region as, the Kumaon Kesari.
- Govind Ballabh Pant, freedom fighter, considered one of the architects of modern India
- Hargovind Pant
- Ila Pant
- K. C. Pant, former defence minister and vice chairman of the Planning Commission
- Prakash Pant
- Sheila Irene Pant or Ra'ana Liaquat Ali Khan, Pakistan
- Bachi Singh Rawat
- Harish Chandra Singh Rawat, M.P. 7th, 8th, 9th Lok Sabha Almora, 15th Lok Sabha Haridwar, C.M. Uttarakhand
- Pradeep Tamta, M.P.
- N. D. Tiwari, three-time Chief Minister of Uttar Pradesh(1976–77, 1984–85, 1988–89) and also served once as Chief Minister of Uttarakhand (2002–2007)
- Bipin Chandra Tripathi, Founder of Uttarakhand Kranti Dal, A political party which started Uttarakhand movement, led to formation of state.
- Shiv Dutt Upadhyaya

== Judiciary ==
- Prafulla Chandra Pant, author and former judge of the Supreme Court of India, and a former member of the National Human Rights Commission of India

== Science and humanities ==
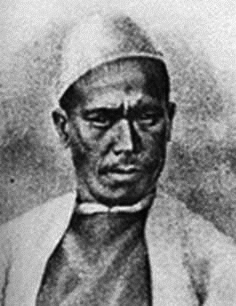
Nain Singh Rawat, C.I.E., first person to survey Tibet

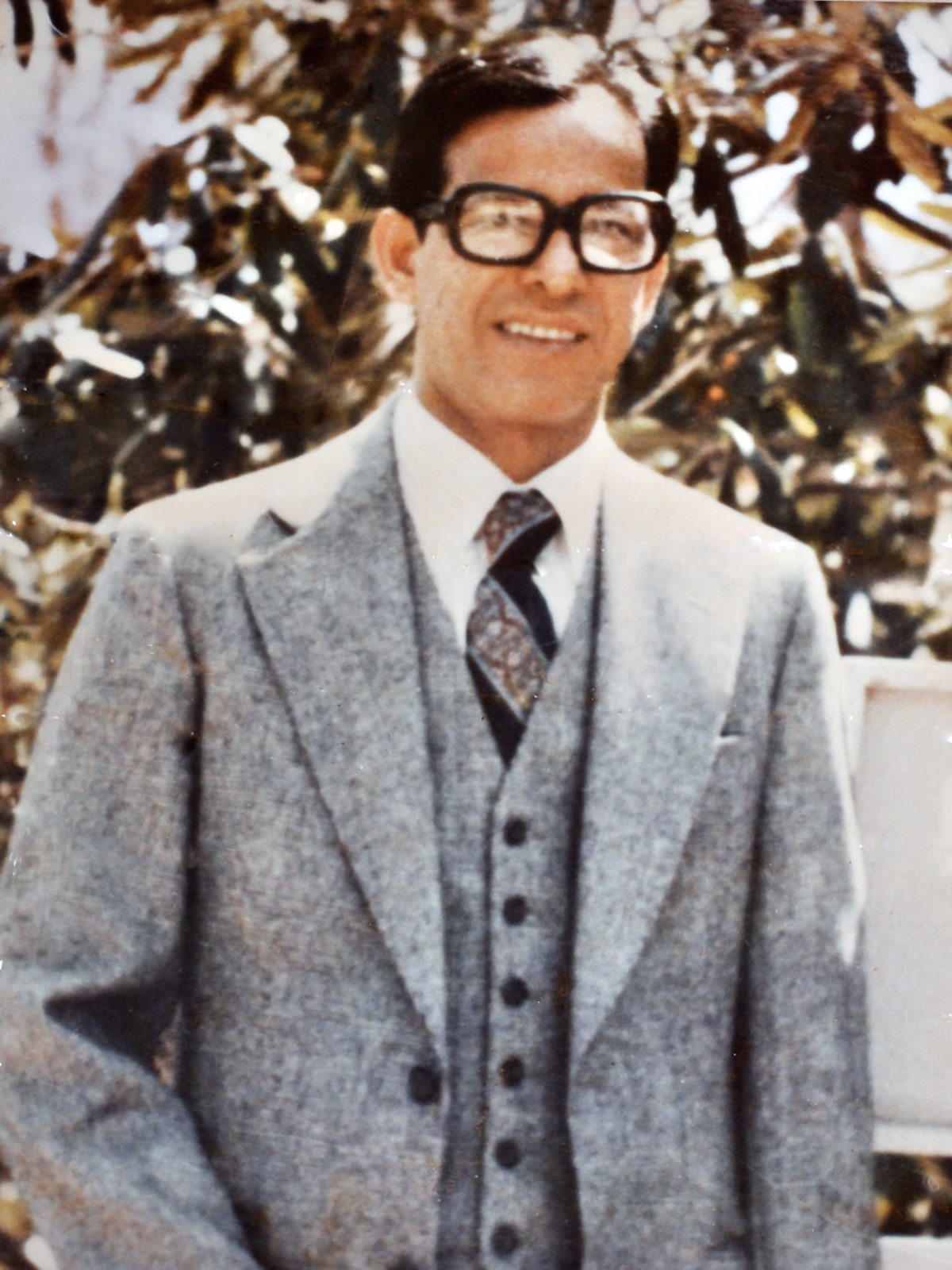
Lal Mani Joshi, Buddhist scholar

- Ravindra Singh Bisht, Indian archaeologist, Padma Shri recipient
- Anupam Joshi, cyber security expert and Professor
- J. P. Joshi, archaeologist
- Lal Mani Joshi, Buddhist scholar
- M. C. Joshi, Indian archaeologist who served as Director General of the Archaeological Survey of India (ASI) from 1990 to 1993.
- Pooran Chand Joshi, social anthropologist
- Shri Krishna Joshi, physicist
- Yashodhar Mathpal, archaeologist, painter, curator, Gandhian and Rock art conservationist.
- Janardan Ganpatrao Negi, theoretical geophysicist
- Ghananand Pande, scientist
- Govind Chandra Pande, Indian scholar, philosopher and historian of the Vedic and Buddhist periods
- M. C. Pant, radiation oncologist
- Nilamber Pant, space pioneer
- Krishna Singh Rawat, surveyor cartographer
- Nain Singh Rawat, C.I.E., first person to survey Tibet
- Dalip Kumar Upreti, lichenologist
- Khadg Singh Valdiya, geologist and environmentalist

== Journalism and literature ==
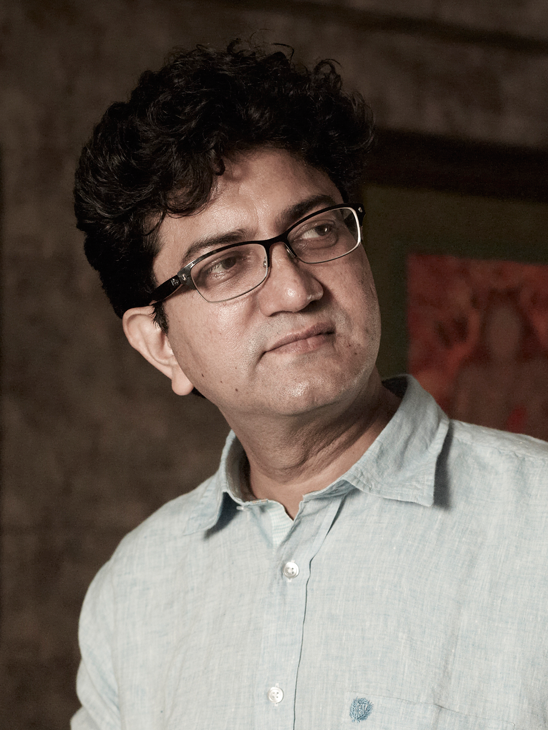
Prasoon Joshi

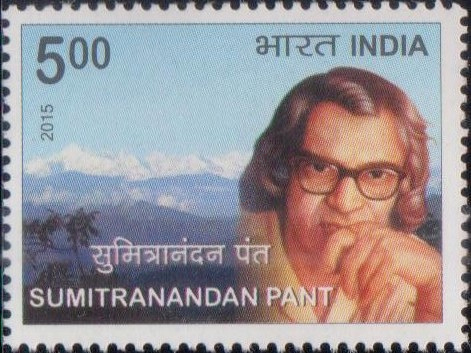
Sumitranandan Pant

- Uma Bhatt
- Namita Gokhale
- Namrata Joshi, Journalist
- Manohar Shyam Joshi
- Manoj Joshi
- Prasoon Joshi, lyricist, poet, advertiser; chief executive offer and chairman of McCann World group India
- Shekhar Joshi
- Shailesh Matiyani
- Mrinal Pande
- Gaura Pant, who wrote under the name Shivani
- Pushpesh Pant, Indian historian and food critic
- Sumitranandan Pant
- Shekhar Pathak, historian
- Girish Tiwari, also known as Girda

== Music ==
- Dev Negi, Bollywood Playback Singer
- Pawandeep Rajan, Indian Idol 2020, Season 12 winner
- B. K. Samant, folk singer
- Mohan Upreti, folk singer, composer of the classic Kumaoni song Bedu Pako Baro Masa
- Naima Khan Upreti

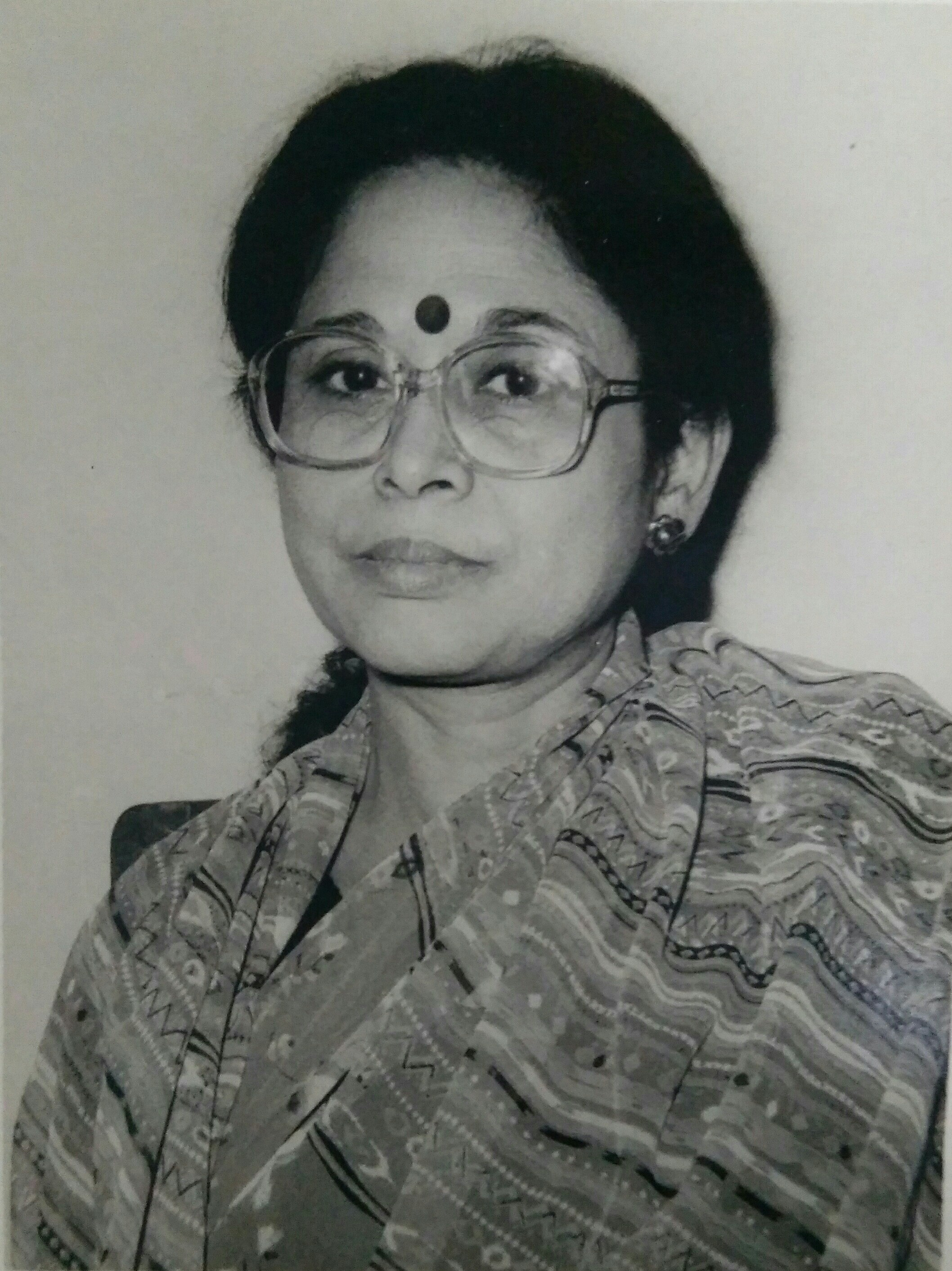
Naima Khan Upreti

Dev Negi, Bollywood Playback Singer

== Sports ==
- Chandraprabha Aitwal, mountaineer, Padma Shri, Arjun and Rung Ratna Awardee. Tenzing Norgay Lifetime Achievement Award
- Ekta Bisht, cricketer
- Kavinder Bisht, boxer
- Madhumita Bisht, badminton
- Unmukt Chand, cricketer
- Rohit Danu, footballer
- Deepak Dhapola, cricketer
- MS Dhoni, cricketer (former captain of Indian cricket team, born to Kumaoni parents)
- Kamlesh Nagarkoti, cricketer
- Mir Ranjan Negi, hockey player
- Pawan Negi, cricketer
- Manish Pandey, cricketer
- Rishabh Pant, cricketer
- Harish Chandra Singh Rawat, 1965 Everester, Padma Shree recipient (1965)
- Lakshya Sen, badminton
- Anirudh Thapa football

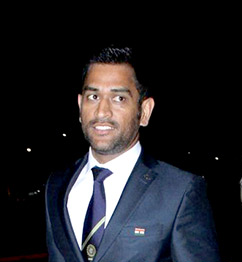
MS Dhoni

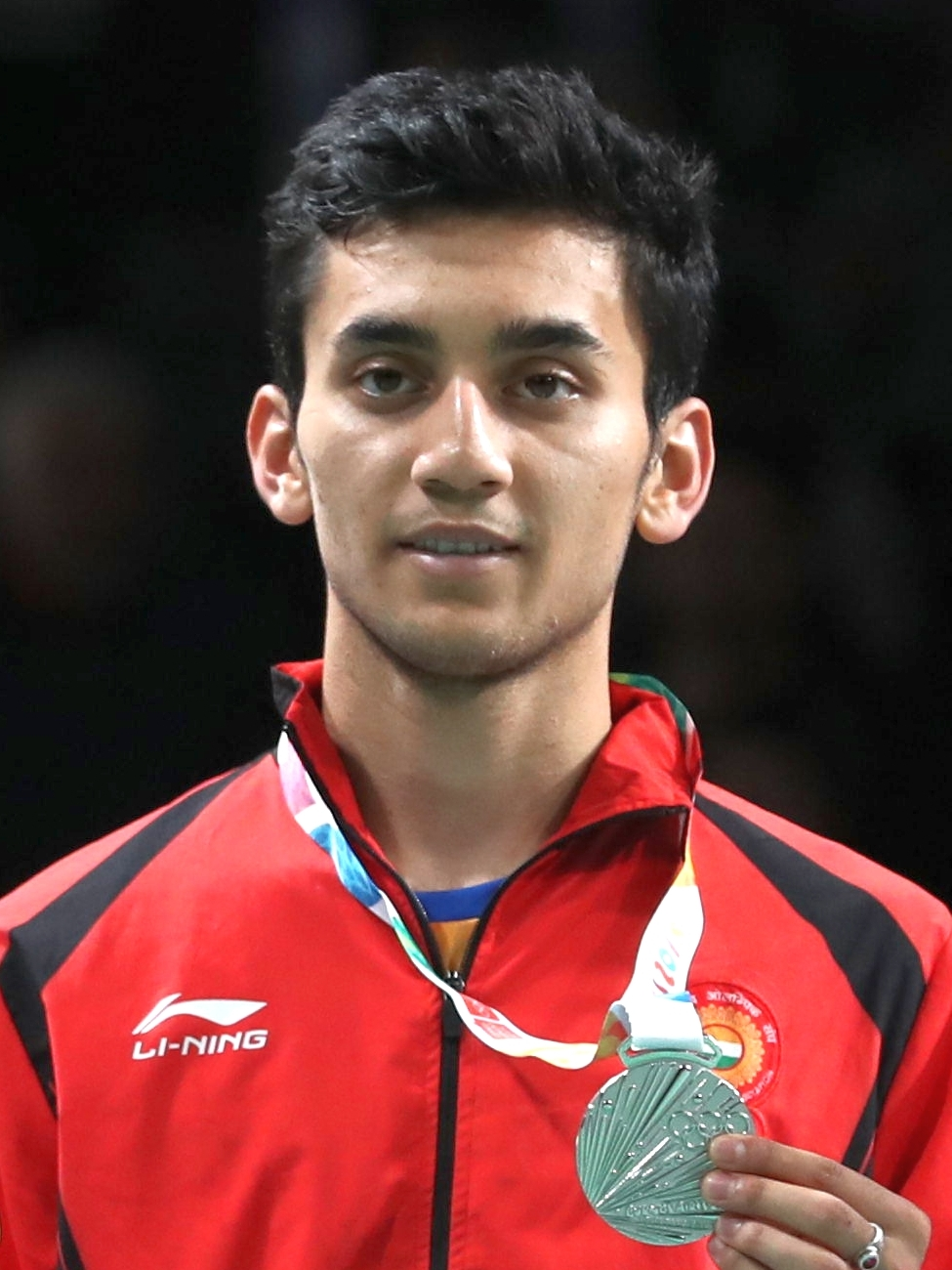
Lakshya Sen

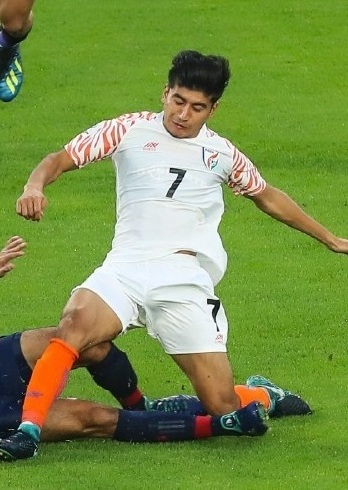
Anirudh Thapa

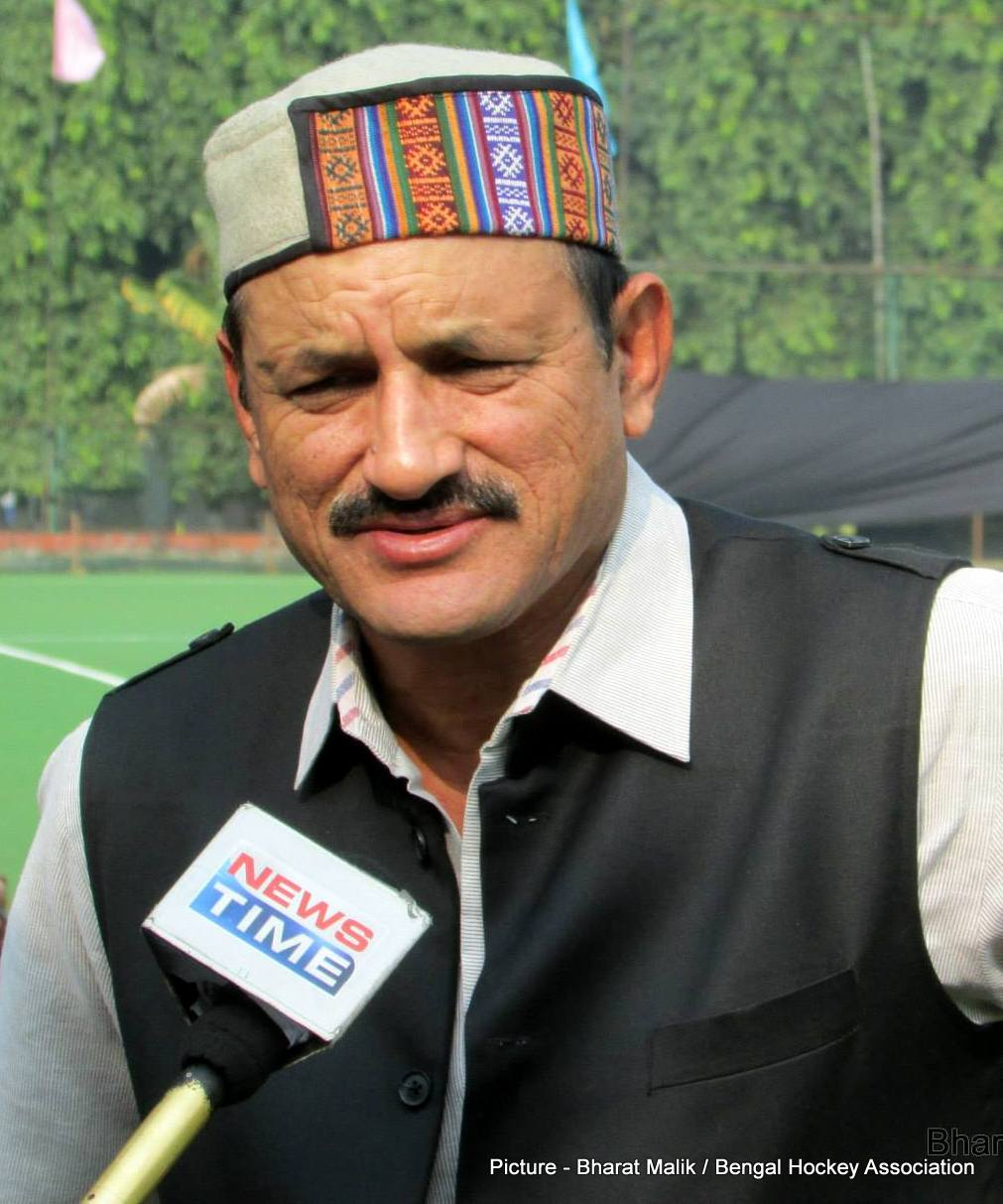
Mir Ranjan Negi

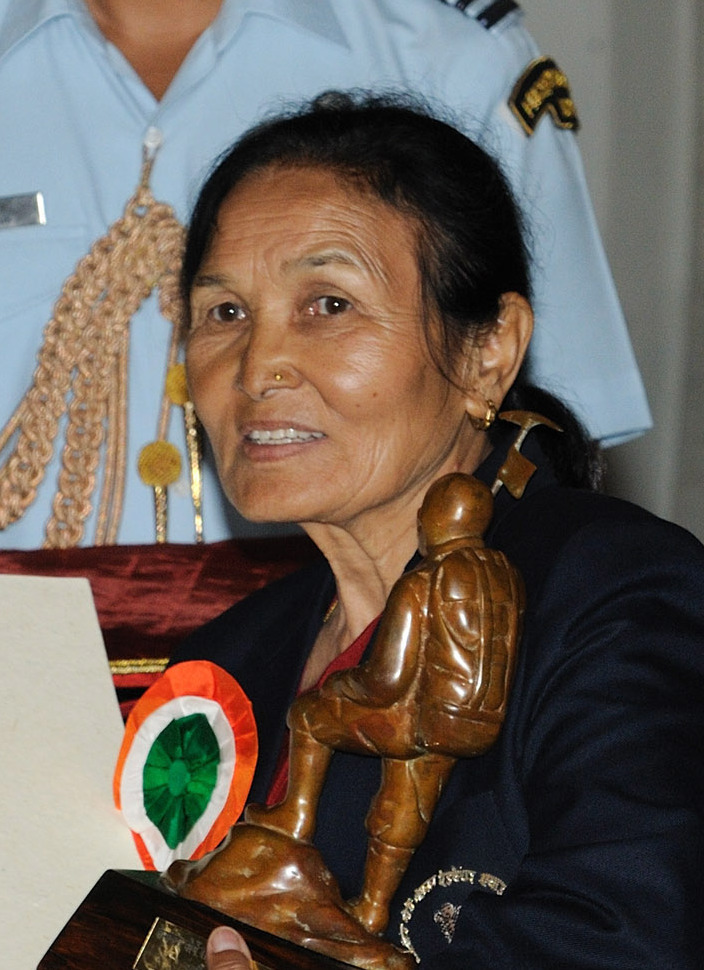
Chandraprabha Aitwal

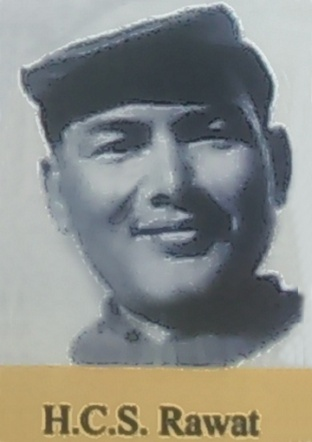
Harish Chandra Singh Rawat

== Films and theatre ==
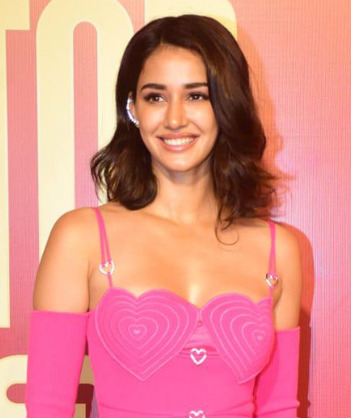
Disha Patani

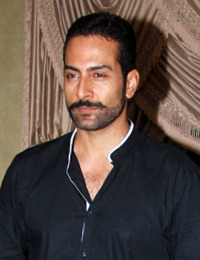
Sudhanshu Pandey

- Sapna Awasthi, Bollywood playback singer
- Nidhi Bisht, casting director
- Gopal Datt, actor and writer
- Roop Durgapal, Indian television actress, best known for her role as Sanchi in the serial Balika Vadhu
- Sukirti Kandpal, television actress
- Vinod Kapri, filmmaker
- Hemant Pandey, actor
- Nitesh Pandey, actor
- Nirmal Pandey, actor
- Sudhanshu Pandey, actor
- Sudhir Pandey, actor
- Diksha Panth, Indian film actress
- Disha Patani, actress
- Sunita Rajwar, film, television and stage actress who graduated from the National School of Drama
- B. M. Shah, Sangeet Natak Akademi Award winner
- Mohan Upreti, dramatist
- Naima Khan Upreti, dramatist

== Humanitarian ==
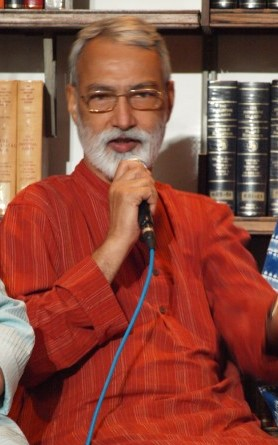
Deep Joshi

- Dan Singh Bisht, billionaire, philanthropist
- Lakshman Singh Jangpangi, former trade agent
- Deep Joshi, social activist, recipient of Padma Shri.
- Vinayak Lohani, National Award for Child Welfare 2011
- Lalit Pande, social worker, Padma Shri recipient
- Kamla Pant, social activist
- Ridhima Pandey, activist for action against climate change

== Business ==
- Ranjan Pant, chief executive officer, advisor, global strategy management consultant and a change management expert
- Dan Singh Bisht, billionaire, philanthropist
- Muktesh Pant, former chief executive officer of Yum China.

== Spiritual Leaders ==
- Baba Hari Dass, yoga master, silent monk, and commentator of Indian scriptural tradition of Dharma and Moksha
- Satyananda Saraswati, Sannyasin, yoga teacher and guru
