= Kumaon invasion of Garhwal (1709) =

1709 military campaign by the Kingdom of Kumaon against the Kingdom of Garhwal

- Part of Kumaon–Garhwal conflicts
Date	1709
Location	Kingdom of Garhwal
Result	Kumaoni Victory, occupation of Srinagar, and plundering Garhwal

Belligerents
Kingdom of Kumaon	Kingdom of Garhwal

Commanders and leaders
Jagat Chand	Fateh Shah

Strength
Unknown	Unknown

Casualties and losses
Unknown	Unknown

In 1709, the Kingdom of Kumaon under King Jagat Chand launched a military campaign against the Kingdom of Garhwal. During the campaign, Kumaoni forces captured the forts of Lobhagarh and Badhangarh before moving through the Alaknanda valley and occupying Srinagar(Garhwal's capital). The Garhwali ruler Fateh Shah fled to Dehradun.

== Background ==
In 1708, Jagat Chand succeeded his father, Gyan Chand, as Kumaon's ruler. The following year, he continued the Chand dynasty's campaigns against Garhwal by launching an marauding invasion across the Pandwakhal Pass.

== Invasion ==
In 1709, the Kumaoni army took Lobhagarh and advanced through Badhan before assembling near Simli at the Pindar-Alaknanda river junction. The force then marched to Srinagar, forcing Fateh Shah to retreat to Dehradun.

== Aftermath ==
According to Edwin Felix Thomas Atkinson, After plundring and looting srinagar Jagat Chand gave Srinagar to a Brahmin after its capture, but Badri Datt Pandey questioned this account and wrote he had plundered, and distributed the looted wealth among the poor and his soliders. It is said that he also sent a part of the wealth by way of Nazarana (present) to the Emperor of Delhi. He levied tax on gambling. Also.

== See also ==
- Kingdom of Kumaon
- Kingdom of Garhwal
- Jagat Chand
- Fateh Shah
