= Sanguri =

Sanguri may refer to:

- Sanguri group of tectonic features bisecting the Sivalik Hills
- Sanguri Wari nihou tyo dhara pani, a song by Tara Devi (singer)
- Sangurí, a stream near Santa Rosa, Paraguay
- Sangurí, 90.7 FM in Santa Rosa; see List of radio stations in Paraguay
- Moti Ram Sanguri; see List of Kumaonis
