= Garhwal and Doti invasion of Kumaon =

Garhwal-Kumaon war

- Part of Kumaon-Garhwal Kingdom Wars
Date	1680-1682 A.D.
Location	Two front war; Champawat in East Kumaon; Dwarahat in West Kumaon
Result	Decisive Kumaoni Victory Invading forces repulsed Occupation of Doti by Kumaon

Belligerents
Kingdom of Garhwal Doti Kingdom	Kingdom of Kumaon

Commanders and leaders
Fateh Shah Deopal	Udyot Chand

Strength
2500	700

The Garhwal and Doti invasion of Kumaon was a joint military offence of Garhwal Kingdom and Doti Kingdom on Kumaon Kingdom in 1680.

== Battle ==
The increasing dominance and territorial expansion of Kumaon concerned King Fateh Shah of Garhwal Kingdom, and in 1680 Fateh Shah and Doti King Deopal made a military pact and joined forces to conquer the Kumaon Kingdom. The battle started as the forces of Doti attacked from the east and the Garhwal army invaded from the west, forcing Kumaon to fight a two-front war. The war lasted for months, and the defending Kumaoni army under King Udyot Chand emerged victorious; the invaders retreated. After the victory, Udyot Chand went on a thanksgiving pilgrimage. Seeing the absence of King Udyot Chand, Deopal of Doti attacked the Kumaon again through Kali Kumaon but was repulsed by Kumaon garrison, and Kumaonis chased the Doti army back to their capital and captured it. A peace agreement was made, and Doti agreed to give annual taxes to the Kumaon Kingdom.
