= Lal Mani Joshi =

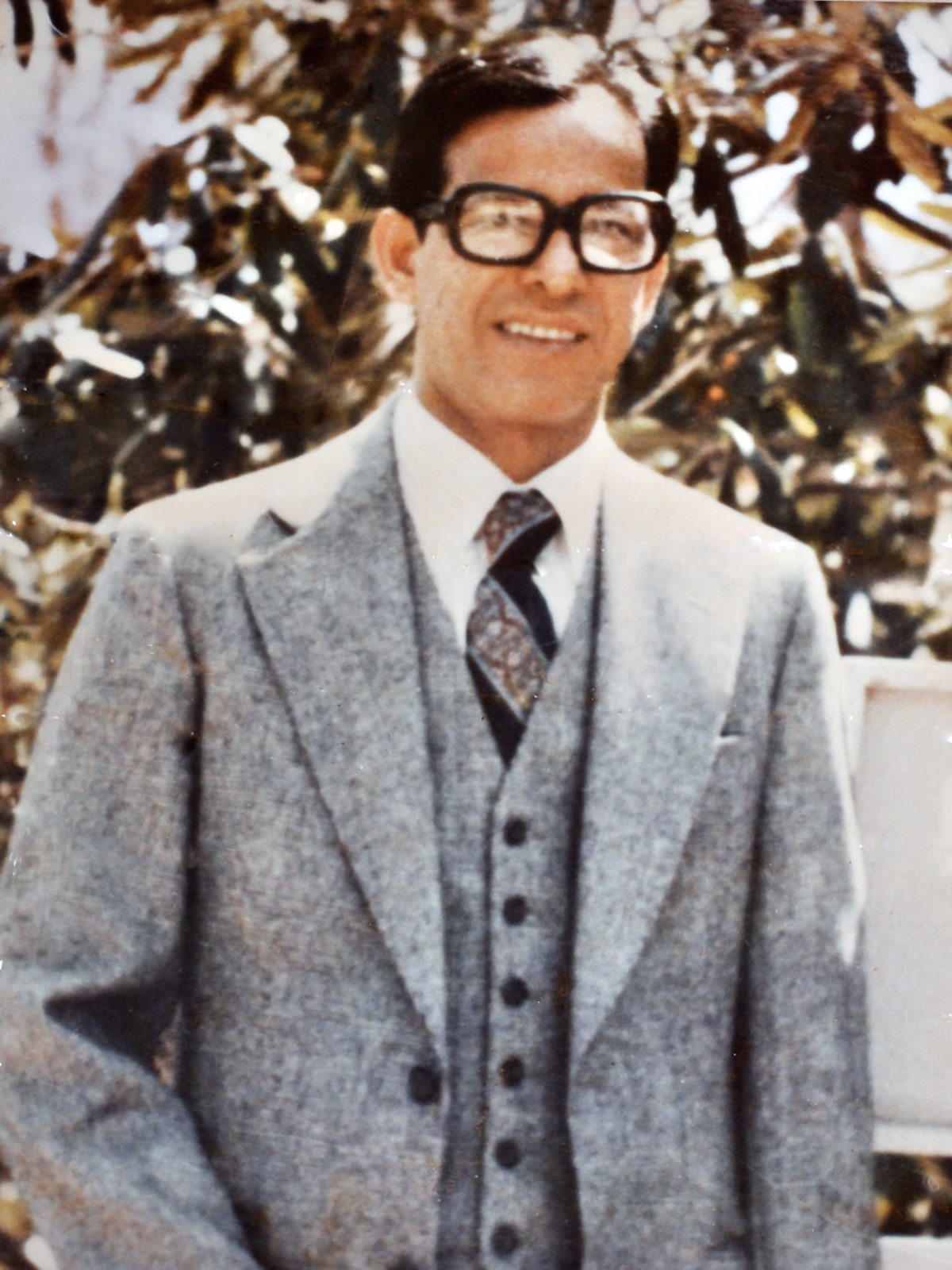
- Lal Mani Joshi, photo taken around 1983
- Born: Lal Mani Joshi; 27 July 1935; Kumaon Hills, Uttarakhand, India
- Died: 16 July 1984 (aged 48); New Delhi, India
- Citizenship: Indian
- Occupations: University professor of buddhist studies and comparative religion
- Spouse: Janaki Joshi
- Children: Dharmakirti, Avalok, Maya

Lal Mani Joshi (27 July 1935, Kumaon Hills, Uttarakhand, India – 16 July 1984, Delhi, India) was a Buddhist scholar and professor of comparative religions and Buddhist studies in a number of distinguished universities of India and USA.

== Early years ==
From 1956–1958, he studied at the University of Allahabad and obtained a B.A. in History, Philosophy and English literature. On the 2500th anniversary of Buddhajayanti (1956), befittingly celebrated in India at the insistence of Pandit Jawaharlal Nehru and Indian Buddhists, L. M. Joshi was attracted to Buddhist Studies. From 1958–1960 he studied at the University of Gorakhpur and obtained a M.A. in Ancient History of Culture (with a special paper on the History and Philosophy of Buddhism). He had the privilege of studying Buddhism and Ancient Indian History under ProfessorGovind Chandra Pande. G. C. Pande played the decisive role in Joshi's formation as a Buddhist scholar. The former also supervised the latter's PhD thesis entitled "Studies in the Buddhistic Culture of India (during the 7th and 8th Centuries A.D.)", later published as a book, which many modern scholars consider a work "of almost encyclopedic order". In 1964 Joshi obtained his PhD from Gorakhpur University and a second M.A. in Pali from Banaras Hindu University. He completed his studies in classical and Buddhist Sanskrit and also finished a diploma course in classical Tibetan.

== Academic career ==
L. M. Joshi held his first lecture post as Assistant Professor at the Department of Ancient History, Culture & Archaeology, University of Gorakhpur, from 1961–1967. In 1968 he was offered a senior research fellowship in the Department of Comparative Religion, Punjabi University, Patiala. Soon after, from 1969–1970, he went to USA as postdoctoral visiting fellow in Comparative Religion at the Center for the Study of World Religions, Harvard University, Cambridge, Mass. At Harvard Joshi shared his profound knowledge of Triyana Buddhism with theologians and simultaneously read Religionswissenschaft in general, and Christian theology in particular. There was where Prof. Joshi met his lifelong friend Robert Thurman, the well known Tibetologist, and Prof. Wilfred Cantwell Smith, who impressed him deeply and whom he often quoted later on: “No statement about a religion is valid unless it can be acknowledged by that religion's believers”. Such guidelines on academic scrupulousness, honesty and enlightened tolerance, prerequisite for genuine scholarship in Comparative Religion, have always stood Joshi in good stead when he, himself a professing Buddhist, in his later writings dealt with other religions, especially with Jainism, Hinduism and Sikhism.

Back in India he was appointed Associate Professor of Buddhist Studies at the Department of Religious Studies, Punjabi University, a post he held from 1971 to 1975. In 1976 the same university offered him a professorship until 1981. In addition to his appointment he had to accept responsibility as editor of his department's biannual publication of The Journal of Religious Studies. In 1980 his university requested him to assume the headship of the Department of Religious Studies.

Joshi spent the last years of his life in USA (from 1981 to spring 1984), first as Henry R. Luce Visiting Professor of Comparative Religious Ethics at Amherst College, Amherst, Massachusetts, and subsequently as Margaret Gest Visiting Professor of Comparative Religion at Haverford College, Pennsylvania.

Likewise, he never eschewed the troubles of travelling to far-away places in India or to Sri Lanka as academic consultant, expert member, external examiner or honorary lecturer. He, of course, also participated in many learned conferences, whether in Rome or Honolulu, at Oxford, Göttingen, or in Siberia.

Another example of his vīrya-pāramitā is his extensive written work. A large portion of his writings though, appeared as articles or book reviews in journals. Very few scholars have written so extensively at such a young age. His last major work, though already completed in the mid-1970s, appeared in 1983: "Discerning the Buddha, a Study of Buddhism and of the Brahmnanical Hindu Attitude to It" (Munshiram Manoharlal, New Delhi). This book testifies to the author's mature scholarship with respect to Buddhist and Religious Studies. A number of scholars have expressed their perplexity as to how Buddhism could have been wiped out of its native country. Here the author gives a satisfactory answer and provides much needed clarification as to what had happened to Buddhadharma in India during the Middle Ages up to the present.

== Last days ==
Though still relatively young, his wish was to finish his academic career in India, his homeland and the homeland of Buddhism. So he turned down offers of extension at Haverford College to engage in his new responsibilities as Research Professor of Buddhist Studies at the Central Institute of Higher Tibetan Studies, Sarnath, in June 1984 when he was 48 years old. He had been associated with this unique Institute (now a University) since its very formation.

For many years, it seemed he had been suffering from gastric ulcers, and in Spring 1984, soon after his return from his prolonged stay in USA, he had to undergo an operation in New Delhi. He appeared to recover his health satisfactorily within a short time when on the eve of his departure to attend a conference in Taiwan, he had new health complaints that deteriorated to an extent that necessitated an immediate second operation. But this time all surgical aid did not help. He was misdiagnosed with a burst ulcer when in fact he had suffered a burst appendix.

Following the wishes of Joshi to spend the last years of his academic life at Sarnath, the place where the Buddha taught his first Sermon, his family decided that his library be acquired by the Central Institute of Higher Tibetan Studies at Sarnath. Nowadays, it is kept as a separate collection named after him.

== Works ==
=== Books ===
- Studies in the Buddhistic Culture of India. Delhi: Motilal Banarsidass. 1977 [1967]. p. 497. ISBN 8120802810.
- Dhammapada, Pali text in Gurmukhi script, Punjabi translation in collaboration with Sarada Devi, Patiala Punjabi University, 1969.
- Brahmanism, Buddhism and Hinduism: An Essay on their Origins and Interactions. The Wheel. Kandy, Sri Lanka: Buddhist Publication Society. 2008 [1970]. p. 75. OCLC 10745141.
- Joshi, Lal Mani; Singh, Harbans (1996) [1973]. An Introduction to Indian Religions. Patiala: Guru Gobind Singh Dept. of Religious Studies, Punjabi University. p. 269. ISBN 8173802025. OCLC 1176558.
- Aspects of Buddhism in Indian History (Sir Baron Jayatilleke Memorial Lecture) (PDF). The Wheel. 1973. p. 68.
- Joshi, L. M., ed. (1997) [1976]. History of The Punjab (From Pre-Historic Times to The Age of Asoka). Patiala: Publication Bureau, Punjab University. p. 370. ISBN 8173803366.
- Vajracchedikkā Prajñāpāramitasūtra with commentary by Asanga (Sanskrit texts translated into Hindi with introduction and notes), Bibliotheca Indo-Tibetica 3, Central Institute of Higher Tibetan Studies, Sarnath, 1978 (see wikisource:Vajracchedikā Prajñāpāramitā Sūtra)
- Vimalakīrtinirdeśasūtram, critically edited Tibetan text, Sanskrit restoration and Hindi translation with introduction and copious notes (in collaboration with Bhikku Pāsādika), Bibliotheca Indo-Tibetica 5, Central Institute of Higher Tibetan Studies, Sarnath, 1981.
- Facets of Jaina Religiousness in Comparative Light, L. D. Series 85, Institute of Indology, Ahmedabad, 1981.
- Discerning the Buddha: A Study of Buddhism and of the Brahmanical Hindu Attitude to it. Delhi: Munshiram Manoharlal. 1983. p. 275. OCLC 10695501.
