= Tampalawela Dhammaratana =

Sri Lankan Buddhist monk

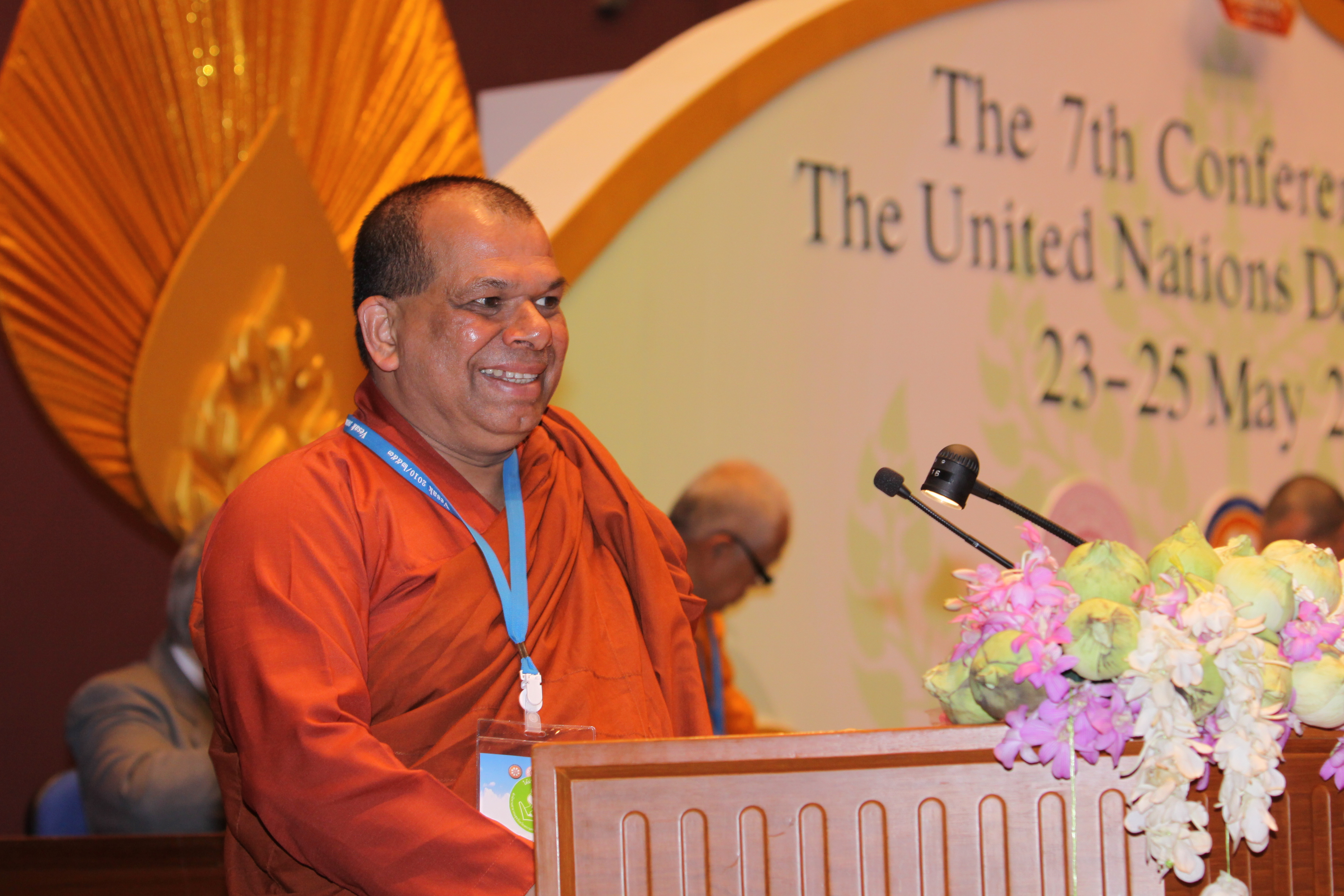

Personal life
- Born: Tampalawela; 1956 (age 69–70) Tampalawela, Uva Province, Sri Lanka
- Education: University of Kelaniya; Sorbonne
- Occupation: Buddhist monk

Religious life
- Religion: Buddhism
- School: Theravada
- Dharma name: Dhammaratana
- Ordination: 1976

Senior posting
- Present post: Vice-President of World Fellowship of Buddhists

Tampalawela Dhammaratana is a French and Sri Lankan Buddhist monk. He was born in Sri Lanka and received his traditional Buddhist education from Sunetradevi University College in Kandy. He obtained his Higher Ordination in 1976 at Siam Maha Nikaya, Malwatte Chapter in Kandy, Sri Lanka.

== Education ==
After his traditional Buddhist education he entered to the University of Kelaniya, Sri Lanka, where he obtained his Bachelor of Arts Degree in Social and Human Sciences in 1984. In the same year he left his mother country and entered the University of Paris, France where he completed his French language Diplomas and received his master's degree in Philosophy under the guidance of Prof. François Lyotard with an upper class distinction. He further continued his higher education in France and obtained his MPhil and Ph.D. Degrees in Comparative Indian Philosophy from the University of Sorbonne (Paris IV), under the guidance of Prof. Michel Hulin in 1989 and 1994 respectively. His research on Doctoral thesis is entitled on “Some Aspect of Anatta (no-soul) Doctrine Depicted in Pali Canon”. In addition to that he has pursued his Post-Doctoral studies under the supervision of Prof. Pierre Sylvain Filliozat at the Higher Studies School (Ecole Pratiques des Hautes Etudes, IV Section) at the University of Sorbonne, (Paris IV), France in the area of Philology.

== Works ==
In 1999, he joined UNESCO as a consultant at the Division of Philosophy and Ethics and contributed to the program of ‘Universal Ethics’. As a copy-editor he contributed to the UNESCO Program called ‘the History of Humanity, Scientific and Cultural Development’, at the Division of Cultural Pluralism and Intercultural Dialogue, Histories Section to publish History of Humanity Volume VI and VII, (which is a general history of the 18th through 20th centuries), under the guidance of international scientific Committee presided by Prof. Georges Henri Dumont, Royal Academy of Belgium, published by UNESCO in 2008.

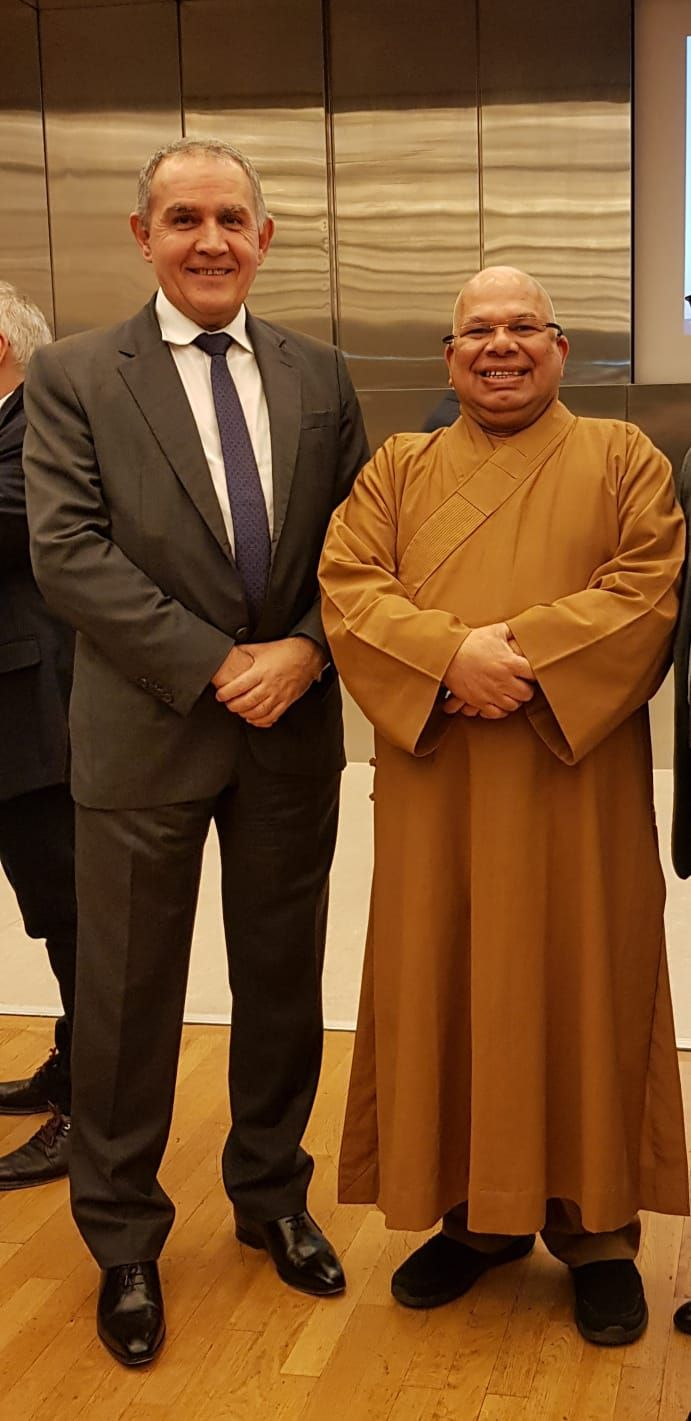
Tempalawela Dhammaratana with the Prefect of Val de Marne Mr. Raymond Le Deun

At present he is a Consultant and the Director of Buddhist Links at UNESCO Headquarters in Paris, France and contributes towards Buddhist education, culture, humanitarian and social development, and the preservation of tangible and intangible cultural heritages worldwide.

Dhammaratana founded the Buddhist Academy of Frankfurt in 2021 with the help of the Buddhist community of Germany, and was elected the first founding president of this new Buddhist Academy. Since September 2022, he directs, with the help of the Rector Bhikkhu Pāsādika, all academic activities such as intercultural and inter-religious dialogues, as well as the spiritual practices of the Buddhist dharma.

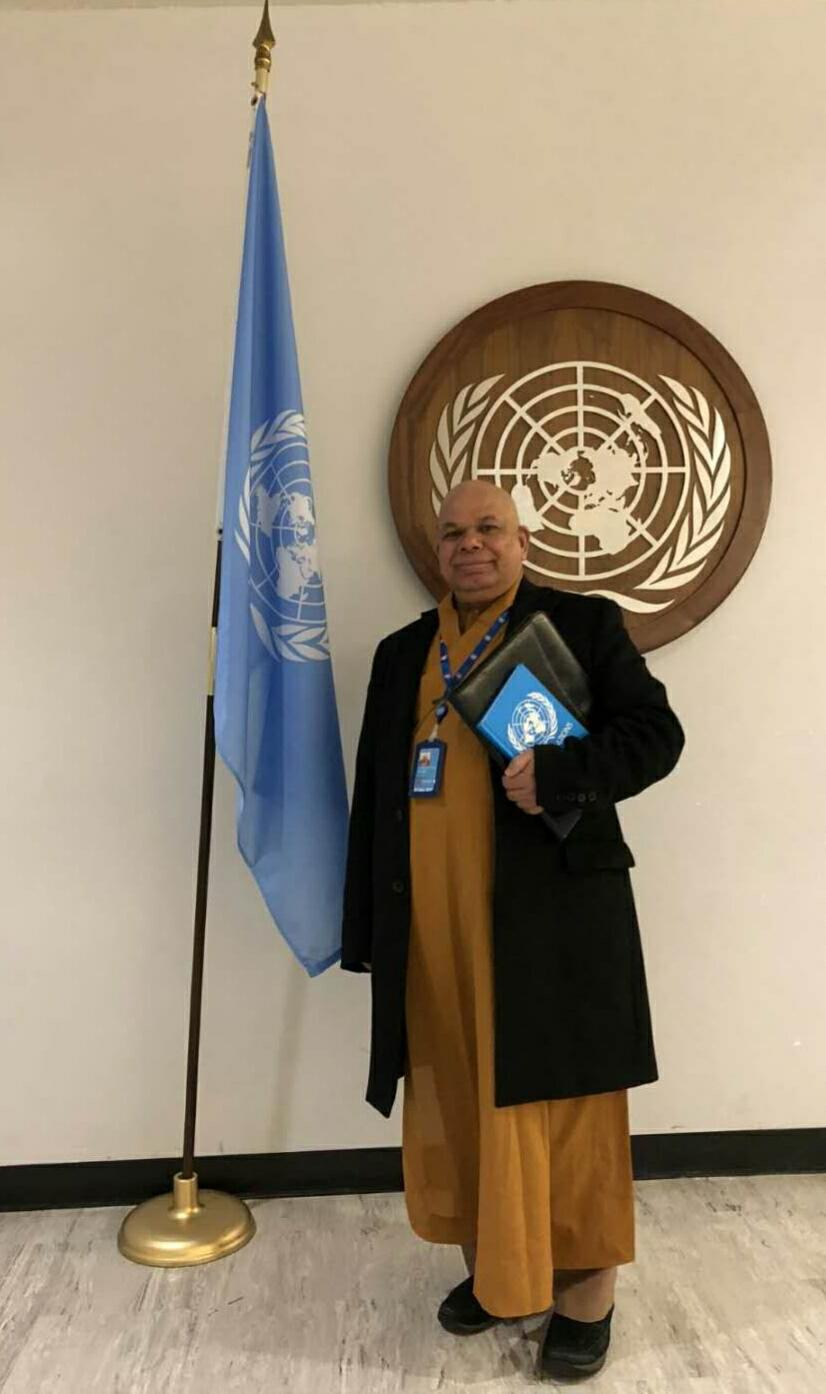
Dhammaratana at the United Nations in New York.

== Publications ==
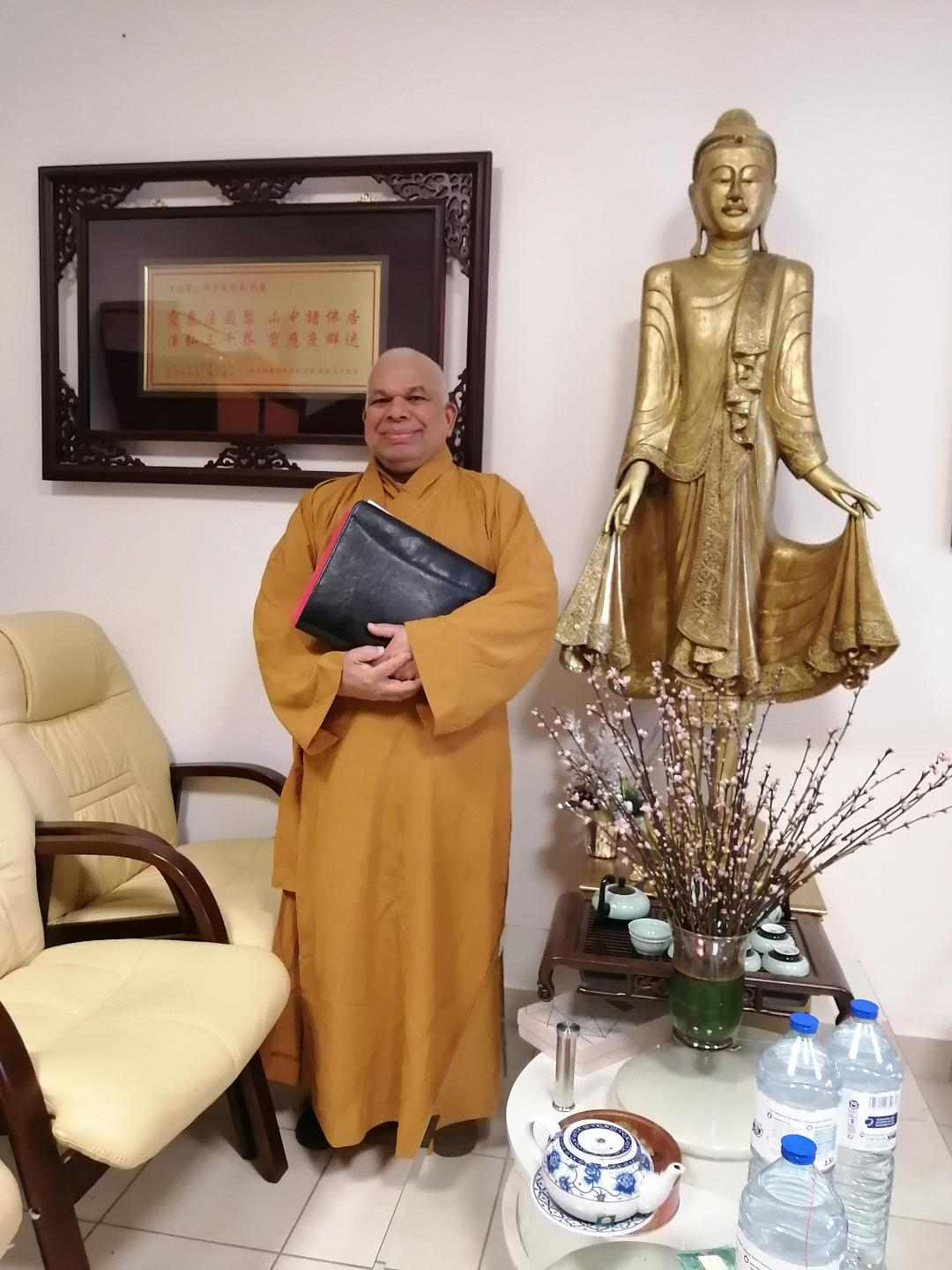
Dhammaratana in Vitry sur Seine

- Older Generations, Chapter 10, Sarvapalli Gopal and Sergei L. Tikhvinsky (eds.), In: History of Humanity, Scientific and Cultural Development, Vol. VII, the 20th Century, Published by UNESCO, 2008
- Buddhist Ethics and Universal Responsibility, to the Felicitation Volume, in honour of Most Ven. K. Anuruddha Maha Thera, former Vice-Chancellor, University of Pali and Buddhist Studies in Sri Lanka, ed. By K. Dhammajoti, published in Hong Kong, 2008.
- Humanistic Buddhism and Social Inequality, by Rupaha Sirinanda, Yalagamuwe Dhammissara, Kivulegedara Narada (eds.)in: Vidurupola Siri Piyatissa Mahanahimi Felicitation Volume, (pp. 214–234), Mattegoda, Sri Lanka, 2008.
- World Culture and Buddhist Values, Hsi Lai University Journal, ed. By Ananda Guruge, Los Angeles, USA, 2005
- Contemporary Sri Lankan Sanskrit Poetry: The Yasodharaacaritam by Davuldena Jnanesvara Mahasthavira (2nd instalment),(Bhikkhu Pasadika and T.Dhammaratana eds.and translates) in: Bulletin d’études indiennes, Nos. 22-23 (Paris, 2004–2005), pp. 287–305.
- Education as Human Right: Buddhist Perspectives, Hsi Lai University Journal, ed. By Ananda Guruge, Los Angeles, USA, 2003.
- Regret - Contemporary Sri Lankan Sanskrit Poetry: Pascaattaapah by Davuldena Jnanesvara",(Bhikkhu Pasadika and T.Dhammaratana eds.and translates) in: Buddhist Studies Review, Vol. 20, No. 2 (London, 2003) pp. 183–188.
- Contemporary Sri Lankan Sanskrit Poetry: The Ya´sodharaacaritam by Davuldena Jnansvara Mahaasthavira (Bhikkhu Pasadika and T. Dhammaratana eds. and translates,)(1st instalment), in: Bulletin d'études indiennes, No. 21.1 (Paris, 2003), pp. 47–70.
- The Place of Humanistic Buddhism in UNESCO Universal Ethics Project, Hsi Lai University Journal, ed. By Ananda Guruge, Los Angeles, USA, 2002.
- The Buddhist Vision of Globalization for the Third Millennium, published By Buddhist Foundation, London, 2002
- Une Ecole Bouddhique Originale: les Personnalistes, (Puggalavadins), Essay in Honour of Prof. Y. Karunadasa, ed. by K. Dhammajoti, Colombo, Sri Lanka, 1997
- Une nouvelle lecture du Syamasandesa de 1756 A.C. conservé au Malwatte Viharaya de Kandy, Sri Lanka, avec collaboration de Mme. J. Filliozat, Dharmaduta, You Feng, 1997, Paris
- La littérature bouddhique des Tika et la Vimativinodani, Dharmaduta, You Feng, 1997, Paris
