= Gyan Chand =

- King of Kumaon

52nd ruler of the Chand dynasty
- Reign: 1698–1708
- Predecessor: Udyot Chand
- Successor: Jagat Chand
- Dynasty: Chand
- Father: Udyot Chand
- Religion: Hinduism

Gyan Chand (R. 1698–1708) was a king of the Chand dynasty of Kumaon, which ruled the Kumaon Kingdom in the Himalayan region. He succeeded his father, Udyot Chand, in 1698 and was succeeded by his son Jagat Chand in 1708.

Udyot Chand had already delegated much of the kingdom's administration to Gyan Chand prior to his accession. During his reign, Gyan Chand led several military expeditions against the neighbouring territories of Garhwal and Doti. During his reign, religious donations, temple restorations, and other public works were common.

== Reign ==
=== Accession ===
Gyan Chand succeeded his father, Udyot Chand, to the throne of Kumaon in 1698. According to Pandey, Gyan Chand was already entrusted with the affairs of the state by his father prior to becoming king.

=== Conflicts with Garhwal ===
Gyan Chand's reign was marked by repeated conflicts between Kumaon and Garhwal. In 1699, he conducted a campaign into the Badhan region, which was then associated with Garhwal. According to Pandey, the Kumaon forces plundered the region and carried away a golden idol of Nanda Devi from a temple dedicated to the goddess.

== Administration and public works ==
Throughout his reign, Gyan Chand engaged in religious and civic activities. Numerous grants and construction projects are recorded in sources related to his reign.

The Kulomani Pande family was given a grant in 1701. Pandit Krishnanand Joshi's name appeared on a copper plate dated 1703. Another copper plate, dated 1718 and associated with the temple of Patal Bhuvaneshwar, is recorded among the copper plates associated with the period, even though it is from after Gyan Chand's reign.

According to Pandey, Gyan Chand went to Haridwar in samvat 1759, which corresponds to 1702 AD, and then performed religious activities. He restored the temple of Vaidyanath on the banks of the Gomati River and is also associated with construction and religious work at Badrinath.

In samvat 1761, Gyan Chand built a house near Dharanaula in Almora and donated it and the surrounding land to Sri Vishwaroop Pant. He also took the fourth daftar from Prayagdas Joshi of Selakhand and presented it to Srinath Adhikari in the form of a copper plate.

The king was also recorded as having undertaken works in the Terai and Bhabar regions, including the construction of a naula at Hawalbag. He was said to have planted mango orchards in the area.

== Death and succession ==
Gyan Chand ruled for roughly ten years. he died in samvat 1765, or 1708 AD. He was succeeded by his son, Jagat Chand, who had already taken an active role in state affairs during his father's reign.
