= Lobsang Tengye Geshe =

Tibetan lama scholar and monk (1927–2019)

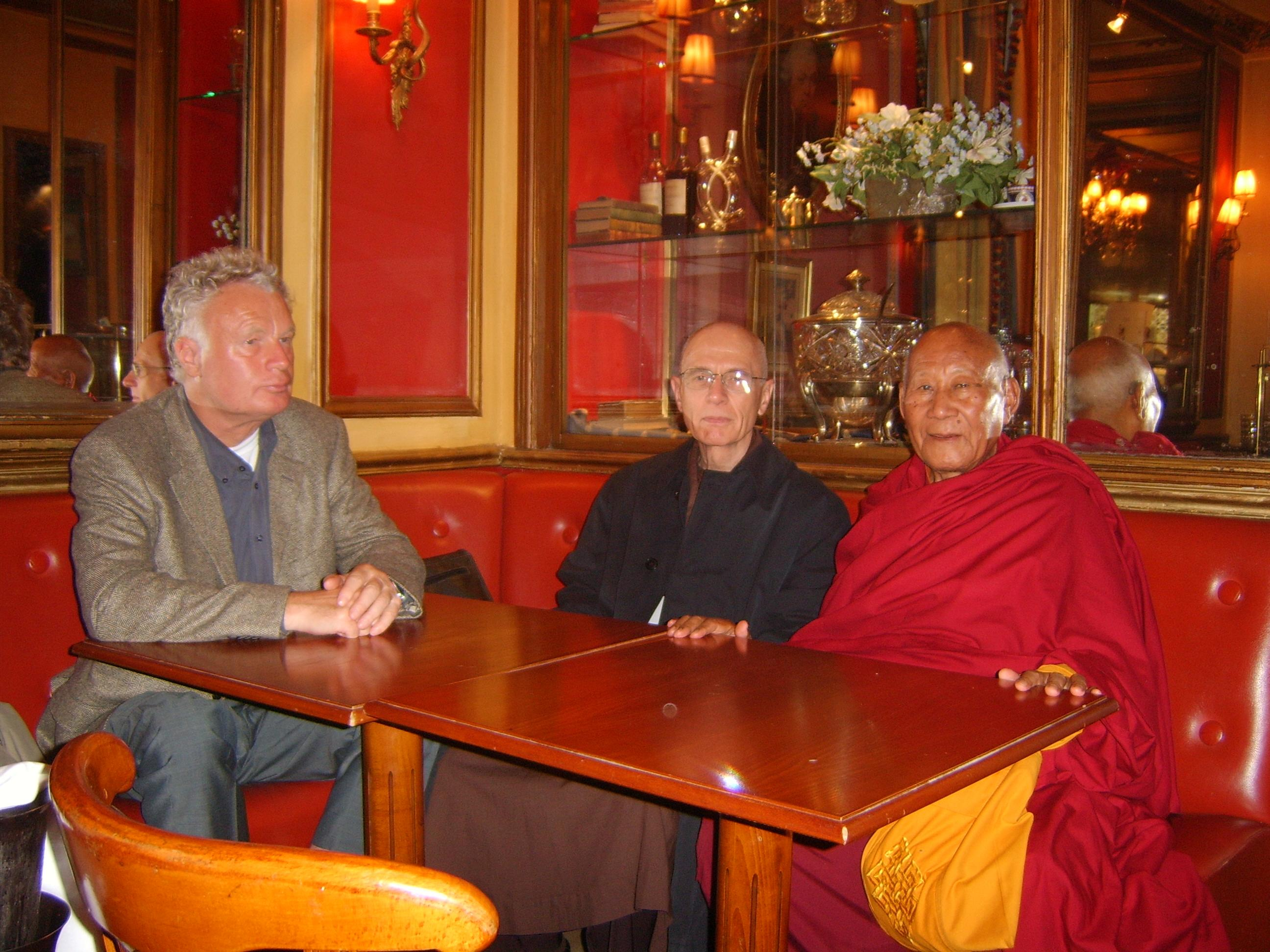
Lobsang Tengye Geshe (right) with the German Venerable Bhikkhu Pāsādika (middle)

Lobsang Tengye Geshe དགེ་བཤེས་བློ་བཟང་བསྟན་རྒྱས་ （31 December 1927 in Lhatse, Tibet - 25 October 2019 in Toulouse, France) was a Tibetan lama scholar and monk since the age of six. He earned the Geshe Lharampa degree, the highest level doctorate in Buddhist philosophy in the Geluk School, at the renowned Sera Je Monastery in Tibet.

He lived in France for over thirty years and worked tirelessly to transmit the teachings of Buddha Shakyamuni. He taught for many years at the Buddhist Temple Linh Son of Joinville-le-Pont, and also at the Vajra Yogini Institute in the Tarn, where he resided until his death on 25 October 2019. After his death, he stayed in clear-light meditation for five days.

== Publications ==
- Suede having Great Wisdom monitoring Turtle and Wild Geese, 1991, ISBN 2-911582-56-X
- The Wheel of Life, 1993, ISBN 2-911582-33-0
- On the Mahāyāna's Ocean, 1993, ISBN 2-9500961-4-X
- The Yoga Guru of Tsong Khapa Lama, 1994, ISBN 2-9500961-7-4
- Lands and paths, 1997, ISBN 2-911582-05-5
- The Wheel with sharp blades, 1998, ISBN 2-911582-04-7
- Collection of teachings, Four lessons: how to abandon the four attachments, reincarnation, eight stanzas of the transformation of thought, the penetrating view. Editions Vajra Yogini (3 September 1999)
- Commentary to the practice of Nyoung ne (བསྙུང་གནས། fasting), 2009, ISBN 2-911582-70-5
