= Shekhar Pathak =

Indian historian

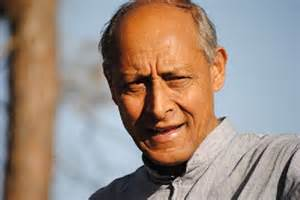
- Born: 1950 (age 75–76); Gangolihat, Kumaon, India
- Education: PhD in History (Kumaon University); MA in History (Government Degree College, Almora); BA in History (Government Degree College, Almora); Pre-university diploma from Berinag
- Occupations: Historian, editor, and publisher
- Known for: Historian of social movements in Uttarakhand; Travels and travel-writing Social activism
- Website: PAHAR

Shekhar Pathak is a historian, editor, publisher, activist, and traveller from Uttarakhand, India. He is known for his extensive knowledge of the history of colonial and postcolonial social movements and contemporary environmental and social issues in Uttarakhand, and colonial exploration in the Himalayas and Tibet. He has also been engaged in activism for various social and environmental causes since the 1970s.

== Personal life ==
In his review of Pathak's 2020 book on the Chipko movement, the historian Ramchandra Guha, an old friend of Pathak, provides a brief biographical sketch of Pathak. Guha mentions that Pathak was born in 1950 in the village of Gangolihaat in eastern Kumaon (present-day Pithoragarh district, Uttarakhand). His father was a soldier in the Kumaon Regiment and his mother was a home-maker. Pathak is married to the literature scholar Uma Bhatt. Bhatt and Pathak co-wrote a three-volume book on the life and times of the nineteenth-century Kumaoni explorer Pundit Nain Singh in 2006.

== Career ==
=== Academic ===
Pathak was a professor of History at Kumaun University in Nainital for more than three decades till he took voluntary retirement in 2007.

He has been a Fellow of the Nehru Memorial Museum and Library, Delhi, and of the Indian Institute of Advanced Studies, Shimla.

From 2015 till 2017, Pathak was involved as an expert with the India-China Institute of The New School, USA, in its Sacred Himalaya Initiative.

=== Travels ===
- Askot-Arakot Yatras

Pathak has undertaken a padayatra, a trek entirely on foot, from Askot in eastern Uttarakhand (near the Nepal border) to Arakot in western Uttarakhand (near the Himachal border), once every decade since 1974. The next yatras were conducted in 1984, 1994, 2004, 2014 and 2024. Each of these yatras has lasted around 45 days. In these yatras, Pathak has walked from village to village with several other interested people, studying emerging trends in society, culture, economy, and environment across the length of Uttarakhand.

- Other travels

In 2007, Pathak took upon a three-year project to study the Himalayan people along with Magsaysay Award winner, Chandi Prasad Bhatt, traversing the Himalayas, from Leh to Arunachal Pradesh. Pathak has also undertaken several explorative journeys in Bhutan, Nepal, Pakistan, and Tibet. He has been on three Kailash-Manasarovar yatras.

=== NGO work ===
- PAHAR

Pathak founded the non-profit NGO PAHAR at Nainital in 1983. PAHAR stands for 'People's Association for Himalaya Area Research'. He has also been the founder-editor of the Annual magazine 'PAHAR', published by this NGO. The PAHAR magazine covers various topics related to culture, society, contemporary changes, history, exploration, etc. in relation to the Himalayas. It has also acted as a chronicle of the decadal Askot-Arakot yatras. This organisation also has a large online repository of colonial-era and contemporary literature of various kinds on the Himalayas, Tibet, and the highlands of Inner Asia.

- World Mountain People Association

Pathak was chosen as the National Coordinator of the Indian chapter of World Mountain Peoples Association, (WMPA) at the first Asia-level meeting of the WMPA, held at Yuksom, Sikkim from 9–11 April 2002. In 2011, Pathak was the Vice-President of WMPA for Asia.

=== Activism ===
Pathak was a student-activist in the Uttarakhand Sangharsh Vahini during his days as a university student. He was an activist in the Chipko movement since its inception in 1973. In November 2015, he returned his Padma Shri award, awarded to him in 2007, to the Government of India, in protest against 'the rising intolerance in the country and the neglect of the Himalayan region'.

=== Other engagements ===
Pathak has frequently written opinion pieces in various regional and national newspapers in India. He has also delivered numerous invited lectures and been a part of many discussion panels in universities, literary festivals, and elsewhere.

== Awards ==
- 1995-98: Fellow of the Indian Institute of Advanced Studies, Shimla
- 2005-09: Fellow at the Centre for Contemporary Study, Nehru Memorial Museum and Library, New Delhi
- 2006: Mahapandit Rahul Sankrityayan Award (Kendriya Hindi Sansthan, Govt. of India)
- 2007: Padma Shri (Govt. of India)
- 2021: elected as an Honorary Member of The Himalayan Club.
- 2022: Kamladevi Chattopadhyay New India Foundation Book Prize

== Works ==
=== Books ===
- Uttarakhund Mein Coolie Begar Pratha 1815-1949. PhD diss., Ph. D. Thesis. History Dept., Kumaon University, Nainital, UP India. In Hindi, 1980.
- Badridutt Pande aur unka yug (Lucknow: Government Press, 1982)
- Uttrakhand Mein Kuli Begar Pratha. Delhi: Radhakrishnan Prakashan, 1987.
- Kumaon Himalaya : Temptations. Gyanodaya Prakashan. 1993. ISBN 81-85097-26-7.
- Panditon Ka Pandit: Nain Singh Ki Jiwan Gatha, National Book Trust, Delhi, 2008.
- Hari Bhari Umeed: Chipko Andolan aur Anya Janglat Pratirodho ki Parampara. Vani Prakashan, 2019.
- Chipko Movement: a People's History. Permanent Black, 2020 [English translation of Hari Bhari Umeed, 2019].

=== Journal articles and book chapters ===
- Pathak, Shekhar. "A Study of Social Movements in Uttarakhand (Summary)." In Proceedings of the Indian History Congress, pp. 455–455. Indian History Congress, 1982.
- Pathak, Shekhar. "Begar System in Kumaon (Summary)." In Proceedings of the Indian History Congress, pp. 505–505. Indian History Congress, 1983.
- Pathak, Shekhar. "Anti-Alcohol Movement." Economic and Political Weekly (1984): 1190-1191.
- Pathak, Shekhar. "Intoxication as a social evil: Anti-alcohol movement in Uttarakhand." Economic and Political Weekly (1985): 1360-1365.
- Pathak, Shekhar. "Pandit Nain Singh Rawat: Explorer Extraordinary (Summary)." In Proceedings of the Indian History Congress, pp. 436–436. Indian History Congress, 1985.
- Pathak, Shekhar, and Hira Bhakuni. "Rise and Growth of Kumaon Parishad, 1916-26." In Proceedings of the Indian History Congress, vol. 48, pp. 397–403. Indian History Congress, 1987.
- Pathak, Shekhar. "Kumauni society through the ages." Kumaun–Land and People. Nainital, India: Gyanodaya Prakashan (1988).
- Pathak, Shekhar. "The begar abolition movements in British Kumaun." The Indian Economic & Social History Review 28, no. 3 (1991): 261-279.
- Pathak, Shekhar. "Mining Scenario of Uttarakhand Himalaya." Glimpses of Central Himalaya: A Socioeconomic & Ecological Perspective (1995): 517.
- Pathak, Shekhar. "State, society and natural resources in Himalaya: Dynamics of change in colonial and post-colonial Uttarakhand." Economic and Political Weekly (1997): 908-912.
- Pathak, Shekhar. "Himalaya ke dwaron ka khulna." PAHAR (People's Association for Himalaya Area Research) (1998).
- Pathak, Shekhar. "Beyond an Autonomous State Background and Preliminary Analysis of Uttarakhand Movement." In Proceedings of the Indian History Congress, vol. 60, pp. 893–907. Indian History Congress, 1999.
- Pande, Girija, and Shekhar Pathak. "Some aspects of urban development: a historical study of Nainital." In Proceedings of the Indian History Congress, pp. 1328–1329. Indian History Congress, 2000.
- Pathak, Shekhar. "Three pre-1947 social movements of Uttarakhand: the Dola Palki, Nayak Sudhar and Gari Sadak Andolan." In Proceedings of the Indian History Congress, pp. 1119–1120. Indian History Congress, 2001.
- Pathak, Shekhar. "Badal Ko Ghirte Dekha Hai." (2001).
- Pathak, Shekhar. "Dalit awareness in Pre-independence Uttarakhand." In Proceedings of the Indian History Congress, vol. 64, pp. 839–849. Indian History Congress, 2003.
- Pathak, Shekhar. "Understanding colonial and post-colonial Uttarakhand." Uttarakhand: Need for a Comprehensive Eco-Strategy (2004): 23.
- Pathak, Shekhar. "Post-Colonial Uttarakhand." Uttranchal: Issues and Challenges of Development and Change (2004): 21.
- Pathak, Shekhar. "Submersion of a Town, Not of an Idea." Economic and Political Weekly (2005): 3637-3639.
- Bhatt, Uma, and Shekhar Pathak. "Asia ki Peeth Par: Pandit Nain Singh Rawat: Jeewan, Anwesan Tatha Lekhan." (2006).
- Pathak, Shekhar. "Himalaya Hai To Hum Hain." Journal of Indian Education, NCERT (2011)
- Pathak, Shekhar. "The Himalaya and our future." Occasional Publication No. 43, India International Centre. New Delhi, 2012.
- Pathak, Shekhar. "Himalaya: Highest, Holy and Hijacked." In Globalization and Marginalization in Mountain Regions, pp. 87–109. Springer, Cham, 2016.
- Pathak, Shekhar, Lalit Pant, and Amina Maharjan. "De-population trends, patterns and effects in Uttarakhand, India-a gateway to Kailash Mansarovar." ICIMOD Working Paper 2017/22 (2017).
- Pathak, Shekhar. "Nature’s Tandava Dance." In Whitmore, Luke (eds.) Mountain, Water, Rock, God: Understanding Kedarnath in the Twenty-First Century (2018)
- Pathak, Shekhar. "Kailas-Manasarovar sacred landscape: Understanding a multicultural transboundary region." Economic and Political Weekly 54, no. 10 (2019): 31-40.
- Pathak, Shekhar. "Comparing Floods in Kerala and the Himalayas." Economic & Political Weekly 55, no. 5 (2020): 27.
