= Lobha Garh =

Medieval hill-fort traditionally counted among the 52 garh of Garhwal, Uttarakhand

- लोहबा गढ़ / लोभा गढ़
- Garhwal region, present-day Uttarakhand, India

Site information
- Type: Hill-fort (garh)

Site history
- Built: c. 11th–15th centuries (trad.)
- In use: Medieval period
- Materials: Stone and dry masonry (typical of Garhwal hill-forts)

Garrison information
- Occupants: Local chieftains; later integrated into Garhwal Kingdom

Lobha Garh (also spelled Lohba Garh) is a medieval hill-fort site in the Garhwal Himalaya of present-day Uttarakhand, India. It is traditionally included in the celebrated list of the baonī or "52 forts" from which the name Garh-wal (land of forts) derives.

== Name and identification ==
The fort is variously rendered as Lobha Garh, Lohba Garh or Lobhāgarh in English-language sources on Garhwal history and ethnography. Reference works and gazetteers discussing the Garhwal forts enumerate Lobha/Lohba among the minor strongholds (garh/garhī) associated with particular clans or lineages.

== Historical context ==
From roughly the 11th to 15th centuries, fortified hamlets and ridge-top outworks dotted the Garhwal highlands. These forts guarded trans-Himalayan routes, river crossings, and grain-producing valleys; many were the seats of petty thākur chiefs before political unification under Ajay Pal (r. 14th century). Survey and archaeological literature treat Lobha Garh as part of this fort network, with construction styles typical of Garhwal hill-forts (dry stone, coursed rubble, and contour-hugging ramparts).

== Clan association and local tradition ==
A number of regional histories list Lobha Garh among the forts traditionally linked to the Lobhan Negi lineage; such lists often pair forts with the clans that held them prior to Ajay Pal’s consolidation.

On the question of broader caste-clan affiliation: Some modern compendia and community genealogies describe Negis of Garhwal (including Lobhan Negis) as a Rajput group with branches tracing to Chauhan lineages; academic monographs, however, rarely treat this specific sub-branch in depth. Works on Rajput ethnogenesis and regional lineages (e.g., Sharma’s study of early Chauhans) are frequently cited in secondary writing, but direct primary confirmation tying the Lobhan Negi subset explicitly to the Chauhan clan is sparse in accessible printed sources.

(Note: Until a page-cited source explicitly identifying the Lobhan Negi branch as Chauhan is located in a reliable publication, editors generally present this as a local/traditional identification rather than an established scholarly consensus.)

== Location ==
While the precise coordinates vary across lists, Lobha Garh is consistently placed among the smaller forts of the central Garhwal belt (present Pauri–Tehri region). Gazetteers and district handbooks that map historic sites attribute the garh to local chiefs prior to integration into the Garhwal Kingdom.

== Fort lists (Baonī garh) ==
The most-cited printed enumerations of the 52 forts include Lobha/Lohba Garh. These lists appear across historical syntheses, development handbooks, and cultural studies, often derived from earlier vernacular histories and genealogical notes. Scholars also note that later authors sometimes expanded or varied the list (to 64 or more) as additional local strongholds were recorded.

== Material culture and archaeology ==
Although few systematic excavations have been published specifically for Lobha Garh, hill-fort studies in adjacent valleys document typical features: terraced defensive lines, stone revetments, dry masonry, and small keep-like enclosures adapted to ridgelines. Broader archaeological and cultural surveys of the Garhwal–Kumaon region provide comparative context for fortification sites and associated settlement patterns.

== Integration into the Garhwal Kingdom ==
By the later medieval period, Ajay Pal’s consolidation drew these local strongholds—including Lobha Garh—into a centralized polity. Regional histories describe this political knitting-together as crucial to Garhwal’s endurance through the early modern era.

== Cultural memory ==
The association of individual forts with particular clans (e.g., Negi, Bisht, Rana, Ramola, Payal) persists in regional lore and is reflected in modern ethnographic and cultural writing on Garhwal. Contemporary overviews of the Garhwal fort-network continue to list Lobha/Lohba among historically attested sites, even where remains are fragmentary.

== See also ==
- Garhwal Kingdom
