= Kamla Pant =

Indian feminist, politician, and activist (born 1956)

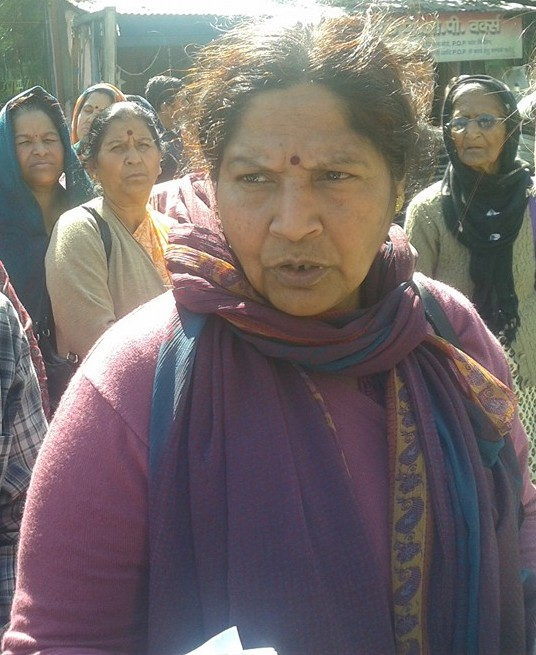
- Pant in 2015

Kamla Pant (born 18 December 1956, Chamoli Uttarakhand) is a feminist, politician and women's rights activist. She is also known for her work in the Uttarakhand movement, which resulted in Uttarakhand becoming a separate Indian state in 2000.

== Early life ==
Born to a working-class family, Pant started taking part in various student movements while she was in school. Her social activism started when she came in contact with activists involved in the Chipko movement. She has a postgraduate in Arts and also holds a law degree from Kumaon University. In the 80s she practiced as lawyer in Kumaon, being only one of few female lawyers in the region.

Shamsher Singh Bisht along with other core leaders of Uttarakhand Shangarsh Vahini were involved with the Chipko movement. The background to Pant’s social activism and agitation politics took new heights during 1984 when as a leader of Uttarakhand Shangarsh Vahini. She led the famous Nasha Nahi Rojgar Do movement in Kumaon, during which she agitated and fasted for 11 days only to break it when erstwhile UP government ordered a complete ban of liquor in rural areas of Kumaon. She worked for tenant farmers' rights in Tarai region of Kumaon. She also worked for women rights, such as focusing attention on women trafficking.

In 1990 Pant, Uma Bhatt, Sheela Rajwar and Basanti Pathak co-founded the region’s first magazine focusing on women and social issues, Uttara, which means "of the north." Uttara, which celebrated 25 years of publication in 2015, has helped to give a voice to many women living in Uttarakhand, presenting women as "an equal gender that needs respect over support." After that in 1992, the Pragatisheel Mahila Manch was formed with other women in Dehradun region. The manch was instrumental in converting the anti-reservation into a separate statehood movement.

In 1994, after the infamous Muzzafarnagar Kand, Pant led from the front and united women from all the regions of the area to come together to form even a larger organization demanding separate statehood called Uttarakhand Mahila Manch (UMM). The organization was not only a front runner and flag-bearer for agitation towards separate statehood but also one of the few all women agitation force anywhere in the world. UMM, under her leadership demanded that Gairsain (a small hill township in centre of two major regions of the state namely Kumaon and Garhwal) be designated as the state's capital, which was a long oppressed demand of state's citizens.

Even today after achieving full statehood, UMM fights for female rights, basic human rights of poor residents of the state, liquor prohibition, trafficking among women, educational reforms in government run school, empowerment of gram sabhas and issues of jal, jungle and jameen. Currently along with leading UMM, she is actively leading from the front as the convener of Swaraj Abhiyan in Uttarakhand along with many of her female and male comrades. Pant has spoken out for older women in her state, noting that in 2014, chief minister, Harish Rawat, has finally decided to pursue a food security program to help the elderly. "A sizable number of women above 60 years have been badly neglected on the welfare front by previous governments," she said.

Pant, along with others, protested the gang-rape of a young New Delhi woman in 2012.

In 2015, she was against the appointment of a transgender person as vice-chairperson of the Uttarakhand State Women's Commission because she did not feel that a transgender woman could "understand and empathise with the problems of women."

She has also recently been calling for fair education fees in schools, especially private schools which have been hiking school fees. She has helped to organize protests and "initiated the movement" to raise awareness of the issues around private schools in Uttarakhand.
