= Lakshman Singh Jangpangi =

Indian Trade Agent and civil servant

- Born: 24 July 1905; Burfu, Johar Valley, United Provinces of Agra and Oudh, India
- Died: 1976 (aged 70–71)
- Years active: 1930–1962
- Parent: Rai Saheb Soban Singh
- Awards: Padma Shri

Lakshman Singh Jangpangi (1905–1976) was an Indian civil servant and a former Indian Trade Agent at Gartok and Yatung regions. He was born on 24 July 1905 at Burfu, in the Johar Valley of the Indian state of Uttarakhand to Rai Saheb Sohan Singh, a rich official of the British administration. He did his schooling in Almora and completed BA Final at Allahabad University.

Lakshman Singh joined the British Trade Agency in 1930 at their base in Gartok, in the western Tibet as an accountant and got promoted as the working Trade Agent in 1941. In 1946, he became the Trade Agent and continued in the post till 1959 when he was transferred to Yatung region. He retired from service in 1962 with the abolition of Trade Agencies. The Government of India honoured him in 1959, with the award of Padma Shri, the fourth highest Indian civilian award for his services to the nation.

Lakshman Singh Jangpangi died at Haldwani, aged 71, in 1976.

== See also ==
- Foreign relations of Tibet
