= Bhikkhu Pāsādika =

German indologist and Buddhist monk

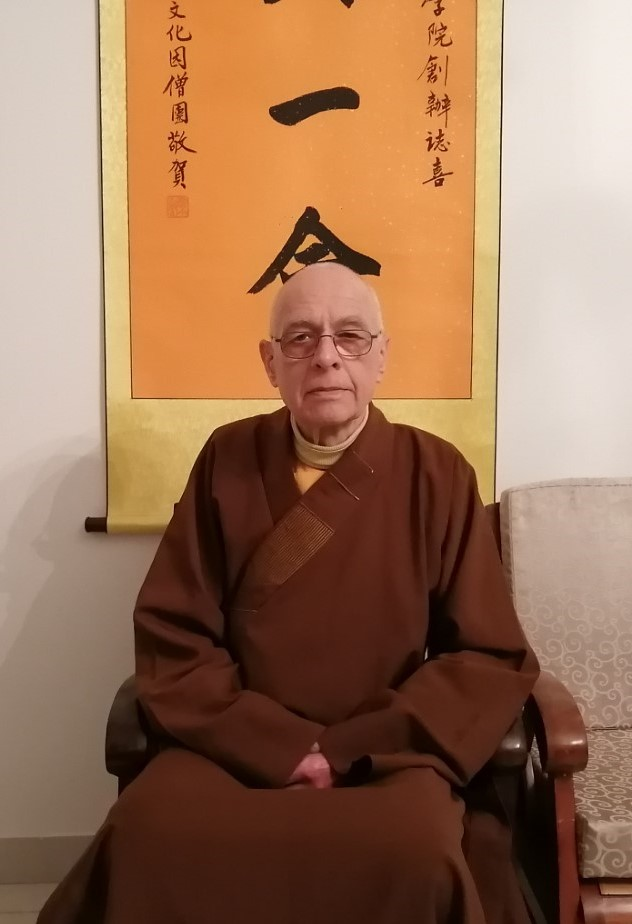
- Bhikkhu Pāsādika in 2020

Personal life
- Born: 17 August 1939 (age 86) Arolsen, Prussia, Germany
- Occupation: Monk; indologist; translator

Religious life
- Religion: Buddhist
- School: Theravada

Bhikkhu Pāsādika (secular name: Eckhard Bangert; born August 17, 1939) is a German indologist and a Buddhist monk. His Dharma or religious name Pāsādika is a Pali word meaning "amiable".

He entered the Buddhist order of the Theravāda tradition (Old School) in Thailand in 1960. He has been a member of the Buddhist Research Institute Linh-Son at Joinville-le-Pont (Paris) since 1978.

In October 2016, he became President of the Linh Son Buddhist Academy in Vitry-sur-Seine, France.

In September 2022, he became Rector of The Frankfurt Buddhist Academy in Germany, and directs with President Tampalawela Dhammaratana the cultural and religious activities of this academy.

== Early life and education ==
Bhikkhu Pāsādika was born on 17 August 1939 in Arolsen, within the Free State of Prussia, Nazi Germany.

In 1964, he received a Master of Arts from Magadh University and a Ph.D. in 1974 from Punjabi University, India.

== Career ==
From 1975 to 1977, he was reader at Punjabi University Patiala, where he taught Pāli and German.

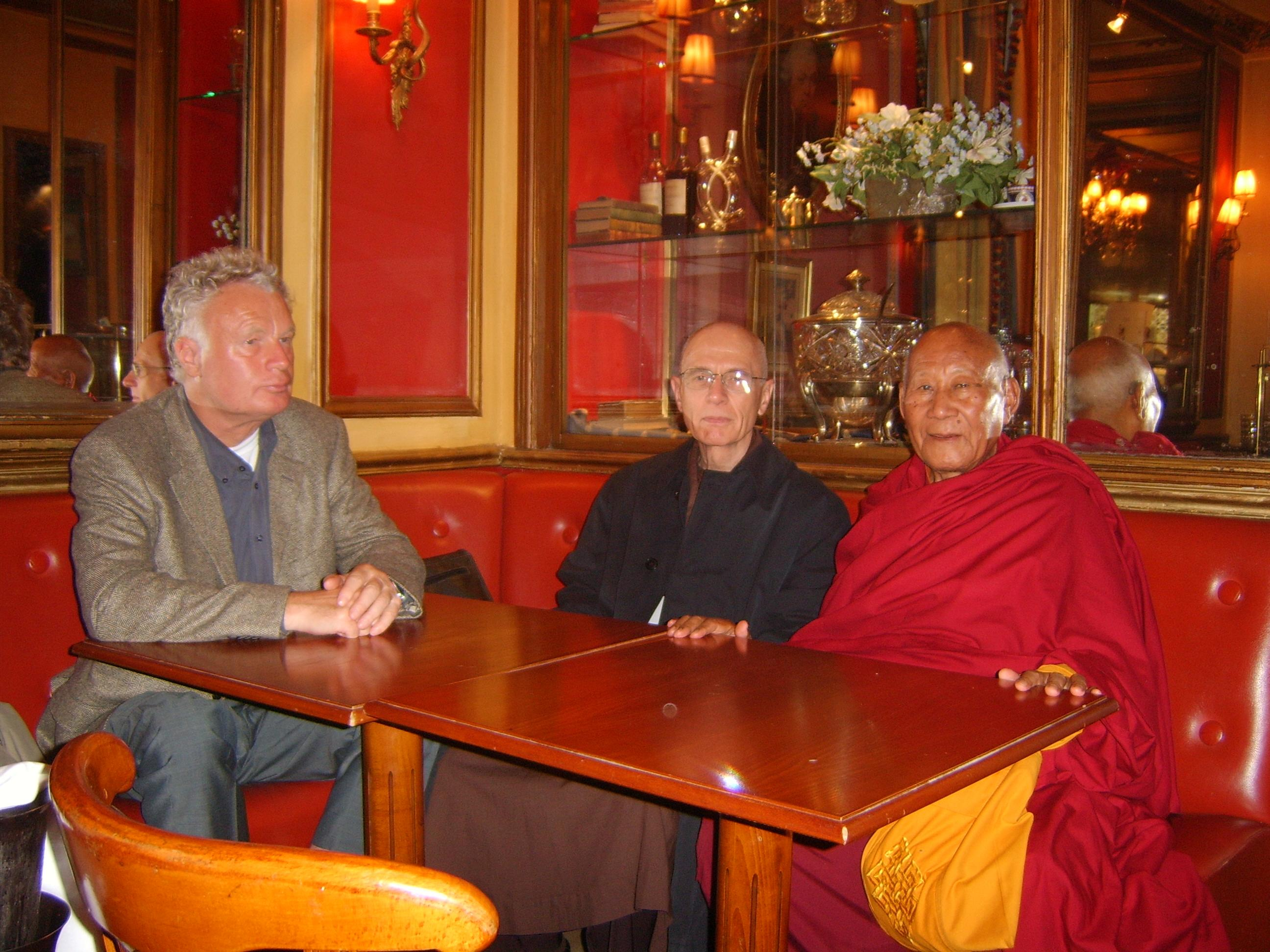
Venerable Bhikkhu Pāsādika (middle) with Lobsang Tengye Geshe (right), painter Dankmar Bangert (left)

He edited the quarterly ''Linh-Són - publication d'études bouddhologiques at Joinville-le-Pont from 1978 to 1982. Then, until 1993, he participated in the project Sanskrit Dictionary of the Buddhist Texts from the Turfan Finds of the Commission of Buddhist Studies, Academy of Sciences, Göttingen. From 1995 to 2007 he was hon. professor, Dept. of Indology and Tibetology of Philipp's University Marburg, teaching Pāli, Sanskrit, classical Tibetan and Buddhist Chinese. Additionally, he was in charge of the chair of Indology at Würzburg University (1996–2000). He also was visiting professor at Ruhr University Bochum (2000, 2002). He has been specializing in early Mahāyāna literature and Śrāvakayānist Nikāya-Āgama comparative studies.

== Publications by Bh. Pāsādika ==
Translation from Thai/English: Siamesische Illustrationen der Buddhalehre, Erläuterungen zu einem traditionellen buddhistischen Manuskript aus Siam von Buddhadāsa Bhikkhu, Social Science Association Press of Thailand, Bangkok, 1968; Horst Erdmann Verlag, Tübingen, 1969

Excerpts from the Śūrańgama-Samādhi-Sūtra - in collaboration with Thubten Kalsang Rinpoche, World Fellowship of Buddhists, Bangkok, 1971; Bihar Research Society, Patna (2nd ed.), 1972; Library of Tibetan Works and Archives, Dharamsala (3rd ed.), 1975

- Vimalakīrtinirdeśasūtra, Tibetan Version, Sanskrit Retranslation (based on his Ph.D. dissertation), Hindi Translation - in collaboration with Lal Mani Joshi, Central Institute of Higher Tibetan Studies, Sarnath/Varanasi, 1981
- Kanonische Zitate im Abhidharmakośabhāṣya des Vasubandhu, Vandenhoeck & Ruprecht, Göttingen, 1989
- Nāgārjuna's Sūtrasamuccaya, Critical Edition of the mDo kun las btus pa, Akademisk Forlag, Copenhagen, 1989
- Dharmadūta : mélanges offerts au Vénérable Thich Huyên-Vi à l'occasion de son soixante-dixième anniversaire - edited in collaboration with Bhikkhu T. Dhammaratana, Éditions You-Feng, Paris, 1997

The Kāśyapaparivarta, Devanāgarī Edition and English Translation, Aditya Prakashan, New Delhi, 2015 (re. biographical details and short list of publications see back cover of this book - www.bibliaimpex.com )

For a complete list of his publications see:

- Pāsādikadānaṁ : Festschrift für Bhikkhu Pāsādika, ed. by M. Straube et al., Indica et Tibetica 52, Marburg, 2009
