= Uma Bhatt =

Indian scholar, writer, magazine editor

Uma Bhatt (born 1952) is an Indian scholar, writer, and founder-editor of a magazine for women. She is involved in political issues in her home state of Uttarakhand.

== Education ==
She obtained an MA and a PhD from Agra University.

== Magazine ==
In 1990 she founded the magazine Uttara which is "women-centric". As well as publishing poetry and fiction it addresses social issues in Uttarakhand, and features the stories of "ordinary" women who have dared to challenge taboos. While Bhatt has been said to "spearhead" the project, there were also co-founders Kamla Pant, Basanti Pathak, and Sheela Rajwar.

== Politics ==
In the 1980s Bhatt wrote a six-page article for the feminist magazine Manushi about the "Anti Liquor Movement in Uttarakhand": a campaign involving women who felt strongly about the negative effects of the alcohol business on family budgets and women's safety. Women from this popular campaign were encouraged in the 1990s to support the movement to separate from Uttar Pradesh, which in 2000 led to an independent Uttarakhand. Bhatt has said they were betrayed by male politicians who made promises about several issues of great concern to women but who then backtracked. She also criticised the way men expected the women who had contributed to the independence movement to go back to a less politically active life once the new state was established.

== Scholarship ==
Dr. Uma Bhatt is a linguist in the Department of Hindi at Kumaon University, Nainital, with a specialist knowledge of Himalayan languages. She co-edited The Languages of Uttarakhand as part of the People's Linguistic Survey of India. This is a series studying both current and dying languages in India. The publisher says the work "addresses the need to look at the languages of indigenous people, minority communities, and the marginalised." Her fellow editor on this project was Shekhar Pathak, a historian, who is her husband. They have also co-authored a book about the 19th century explorer Nain Singh.
