= Udyot Chand =

- Maharajadhiraja

Raja of Kumaon
- Reign: 1678–1698
- Predecessor: Baz Bahadur Chand
- Successor: Gyan Chand
- Born: Unknown; Kumaon Kingdom
- Died: 1698; Almora, Kumaon Kingdom
- Issue: Gyan Chand
- Dynasty: Chand dynasty
- Father: Baz Bahadur Chand
- Religion: Hinduism

Udyot Chand (1678–1698) was a king of the Chand dynasty who ruled over the Kumaon Kingdom from 1678 to 1698 CE. After ascending the throne after his father Baz Bahadur Chand, he followed Chand's tradition of resisting the invasions by the rival kingdoms of Garhwal and Doti into Kumaon. His rule is known for waging wars, administrative consolidation, patronizing Hindu temples and scholars, and developing Almora.

== Early life and accession ==
Udyot Chand was the son of Baz Bahadur Chand, King of Kumaon. Before succeeding to the throne, he was posted at Gangoli. He was called back to Almora and succeeded his father on the throne of Kumaon after his death in 1678. There was regular military pressure from the neighboring Garhwal Kingdom and Raikas of Doti at the time of his accession, and most of his time was spent shoring up frontier defense.

== Military campaigns ==
=== Campaigns against Garhwal ===
Soon after his accession to the throne, Udyot Chand waged war against Garhwal. He entered Badhan and captured Chandpur after defeating the local defenders. The Garhwal ruler then allied himself with Deo Pal, the raika of Doti, against Chand.

In 1680, the combined forces of Garhwal and Doti invaded east Kumaon and captured Champawat. The Garhwali forces also entered through Dungagiri and Dwarahat in west Kumaon. However, they met with only initial success as the Kumaonis soon regained control and expelled the intruders by 1682. Udyot Chand’s forces even managed to recover all the lost territories by the end of 1682. It was during this period that garrisons were permanently stationed at Dungagiri and Dwarahat to check any future Garhwal or Doti invasion

=== Conflicts with Doti ===
While Udyot Chand was away, Deo Pal of Doti captured KailiKumaon. Udyot Chand retaliated by expelling the Dotiyals from Kumaon and capturing Ajmergarh. Deo Pal had to flee towards Khairagarh in the state of Oudh. A treaty was signed between the two rulers, according to which the raika of Doti agreed to pay tribute to Kumaon. A fort was also built on the spot where the treaty was signed. However, this peace turned out to be short-lived. The raika of Doti defaulted on his tribute payments in 1696 and invaded east Kumaon. In response, Udyot Chand sent his generals Sri Shiromani Joshi and Manorath Joshi to drive the Dotiyals out of Kumaon. Although Joshi was killed in the fighting, the Kumaonis managed to expel the invaders and restore their king’s rights.

== Administration ==
A significant part of the reign of Udyot Chand was dedicated to the strengthening of the administration that survived from previous rulers. Permanent garrisons were established in key strategic areas, and the administration of the frontier was also improved. Udyot Chand began to withdraw from politics towards the end of his reign, leading to the transfer of many responsibilities to his son and heir apparent, Gyan Chand.

== Religious patronage ==
Udyot Chand was a pious Hindu and a generous donor to Hindu temples and Brahmins. Many jagirs and godhs in Kumaon were granted to temples and Brahmins.

The following temples, among others, are traditionally attributed to the donations of Udyot Chand:

Tripurasundari Temple, Parvatishwar Temple, Baleshwar Temple, Rameshwar Temple, Jageshwar Temple, Kalika Temple, , and Nagarjun Temple. Moreover, he also contributed to the restoration of ancient temples and the construction of new ones in Nandadevi, Dwara, Bel, and other places. According to available data, during the reign of Udyot Chand, fifteen land donations were made to temples and Brahmins

== Death and succession ==
Udyot Chand died after about two decades of rule in 1698 and was succeeded by his son Gyan Chand. Thus, Kumaun retained its status as one of the most powerful hill states in the region despite the numerous sieges and attacks on its territory.

== Legacy ==
Udyot Chand is remembered as one of the significant rulers of the later Chand dynasty. His reign combined military defence with religious patronage and administrative consolidation. His temple grants, frontier campaigns, and contributions to the development of Almora remain prominent features of Kumaoni historical tradition.
