= Jagat Chand =

Jagat Chand जगत चन्द
- Maharajadhiraja

53rd Ruler of Chand Dynasty of Kumaon Kingdom
- Reign: 1708-1720
- Predecessor: Gyan Chand
- Successor: Raja Devi Chand

Rajadhiraja of Kumaon
- Born: Malla Mahal Almora Kumaon Kingdom, (present day Uttarakhand)
- Died: c. 1720; Almora, Kumaon Kingdom
- Issue: Kunwar Devi Singh
Names
- Jagat Chand
- Dynasty: Chand Dynasty
- Father: Raja Gyan Chand
- Religion: Hinduism

Raja Jagat Chand (reigned c. 1708-1720) was the Chand king of Kumaon Kingdom. He ascended throne of Kumaon in 1708 CE after his father King Gyan Chand's death. In 1715 CE during Battle of Moradabad he defeated the unite forces of Sikh and Garhwal Kingdom.He Ended The Invasion of Banda Singh Bahadur and He captured Srinagar, the capital of Garhwal.
