= Sattal =

Group of fresh-water lakes in India, situated in the Lower Himalayan Range

- Location within Uttarakhand
- Interactive map of Sattal
- Location: Uttarakhand, India
- Coordinates: 29°20′54″N 79°31′54″E
- Basin countries: India
- Settlements: Bhimtal

Sattal or Sat Tal (lit. 'Seven lakes') is an interconnected group of seven freshwater lakes situated in the Lower Himalayan Range near Bhimtal, a town of the Nainital district in Uttarakhand, India. During the British Raj, the area had a tea plantation, one of four in the Kumaon area at that time.

The lakes sit at an altitude of 1370 metres below lush orchards in the Mehragaon valley.

Set amongst dense forests of oak and pine trees, Sattal is one of the few unspoiled and unpolluted freshwater biomes in India. These lakes are a paradise for migratory birds. It is home to a few camps being operated mostly by local people catering to tourists looking for outdoor vacations.

== Geology and physiography ==
Sattal is situated in the Lower Himalayan Range and is the result of tectonic activities and the uplifting of sediments between the Tibetan plain and the Indo-Gangetic plains. The rocks are mainly sedimentary rocks and quartzite. Physiographically the area can be divided into lower Himalayas and terraces.

=== Ecology ===
Sattal is an ecologically fragile mesotrophic group of lakes and under the impact of heavy environmental degradation. Extensive deforestation, dumping of non-biodegradable waste, uncontrolled urbanization of the catchments and nearby forest is harming the ecology of the area. This results in scanty rainfall, a decrease in the number of plant and animal species and rapid drying up of perennial springs. The lakes also suffer from a reduced oxygen content and high levels of nitrogen and phosphorus. Poaching has eliminated many wild animals. Khudariya Tal became Sukha Tal (Dry Lake) due to the leakage of water from its western extremity. An extensive growth of invasive plants such as Lantana, Parthenium and Eichhornia is also endangering the ecological survival of the lakes.

== Flora and fauna ==
=== Biological diversity ===
Sattal is unique for its biodiversity and ecological amplitude. It is known to be a birding paradise and supports a number of local and migratory birdlife. It has 500 species of resident and migratory birds, 20 species of mammals, over 525 species of butterflies and over 11,000 species of moths, beetles, bugs and other insects. The flora covers a wide and diverse range of plants ranging from Bryophytes, orchids, rare climbing plants, ferns, lichens, fungi, medicinal herbs and shrubs. Each individual lake has its own unique Diatom index. The Trophic Diatom Index uses the composition of freshwater diatom assemblages to assess water quality and ecological status.

=== Birds ===
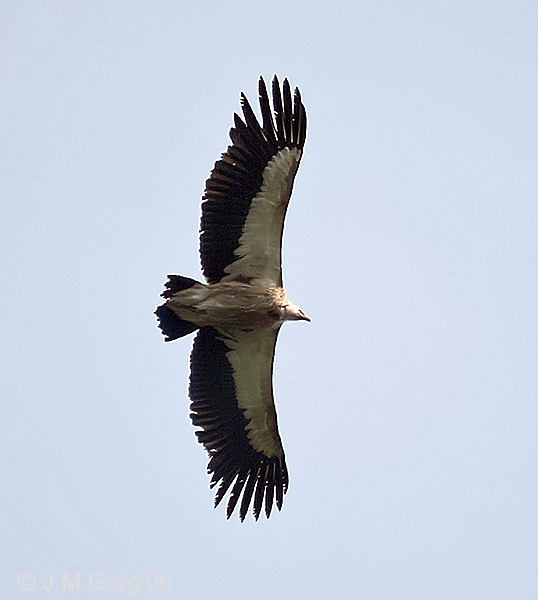
Himalayan griffon

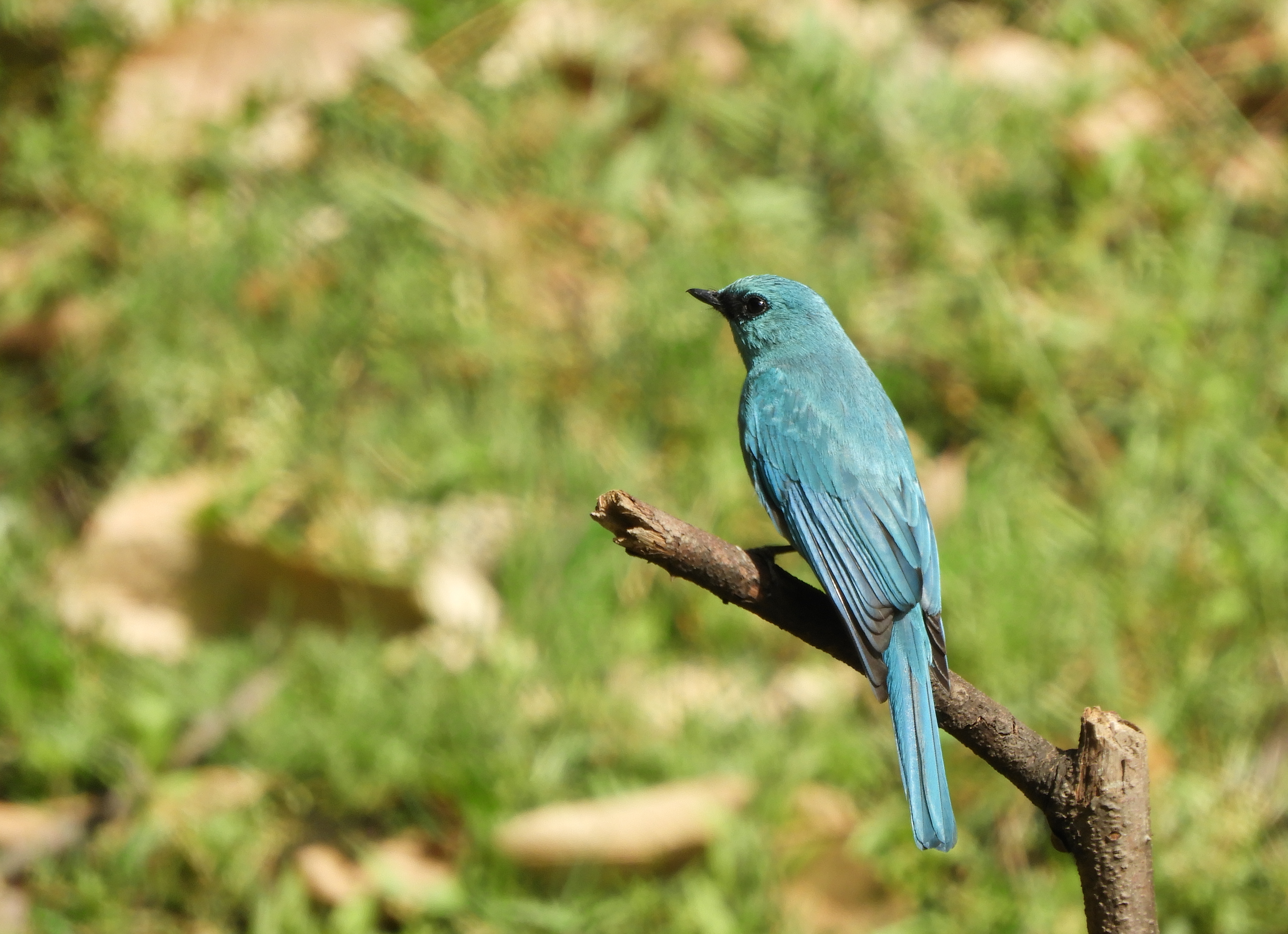
Verditer Flycatcher at Sattal

The unique avian fauna of Sattal includes red-billed blue magpie, kingfishers, blue-throated and brown-headed barbets, lineated barbet, golden-throated barbet, great barbet, coppersmith barbet plum-headed parakeet, slaty-headed parakeet, chestnut bellied rock thrush, tits, babblers, jungle owlet, pied woodpecker, brown-capped pygmy woodpecker, grey-capped pygmy woodpecker, brown-fronted woodpecker, stripe-breasted woodpecker, yellow-crowned woodpecker, rufous-bellied woodpecker, crimson-breasted woodpecker, Himalayan woodpecker, lesser yellownape woodpecker, greater yellow-naped woodpecker, streak-throated woodpecker, grey-headed woodpecker, scaly-bellied woodpecker, common flameback woodpecker, Indian tree pies, blue whistling-thrush, lammergeier, Himalayan griffon, crested serpent eagle, flycatchers, Kalij pheasant, dollarbird, leaf birds, flowerpecker, purple sunbird, brown headed stork-billed kingfisher, stork-billed kingfisher, crested kingfisher, white-throated kingfisher, pied kingfisher, common kingfisher, blue-eared kingfisher, Himalayan kingfisher, Mrs. Gould's sunbird, green-tailed sunbird, black-throated sunbird, black-breasted sunbird, crimson sunbird, fire-tailed sunbird, thick-billed flowerpecker, plain-leaf flowerpecker, fire-breasted flowerpecker, russet sparrow, black-headed jay, scaly-breasted cupwing, black-capped sibia, blue whistling thrush, finches, mountain hawk eagle, black eagle, Eurasian jay, white-rumped needletail, black-headed jay, black-lored, black-throated tits, black bulbul, ashy-throated warblers, black-chinned babbler, rufous-breasted accentor, red-billed blue magpie, grey-winged blackbird, Eurasian griffon, common buzzard, black-chinned babbler, pink-browed rosefinch, common wood pigeon (Columba palumbus), slaty-headed parakeet (Psittacula himalayana), laughingthrush (Garrulax leucolophus), chestnut-tailed minla (Actinodura strigula), lemon-rumped warblers (Phylloscopus chloronotus), and many more.

=== Fish ===
Sattal has many different varieties of fish. Mahseers (Tor tor and Tor putitora) are found here in large numbers. Labeo rohita, Cirrhinus mrigala, Schizothorax richardsonii and Catla catla are some of the other fish found in the lakes.

=== Butterflies and moths ===
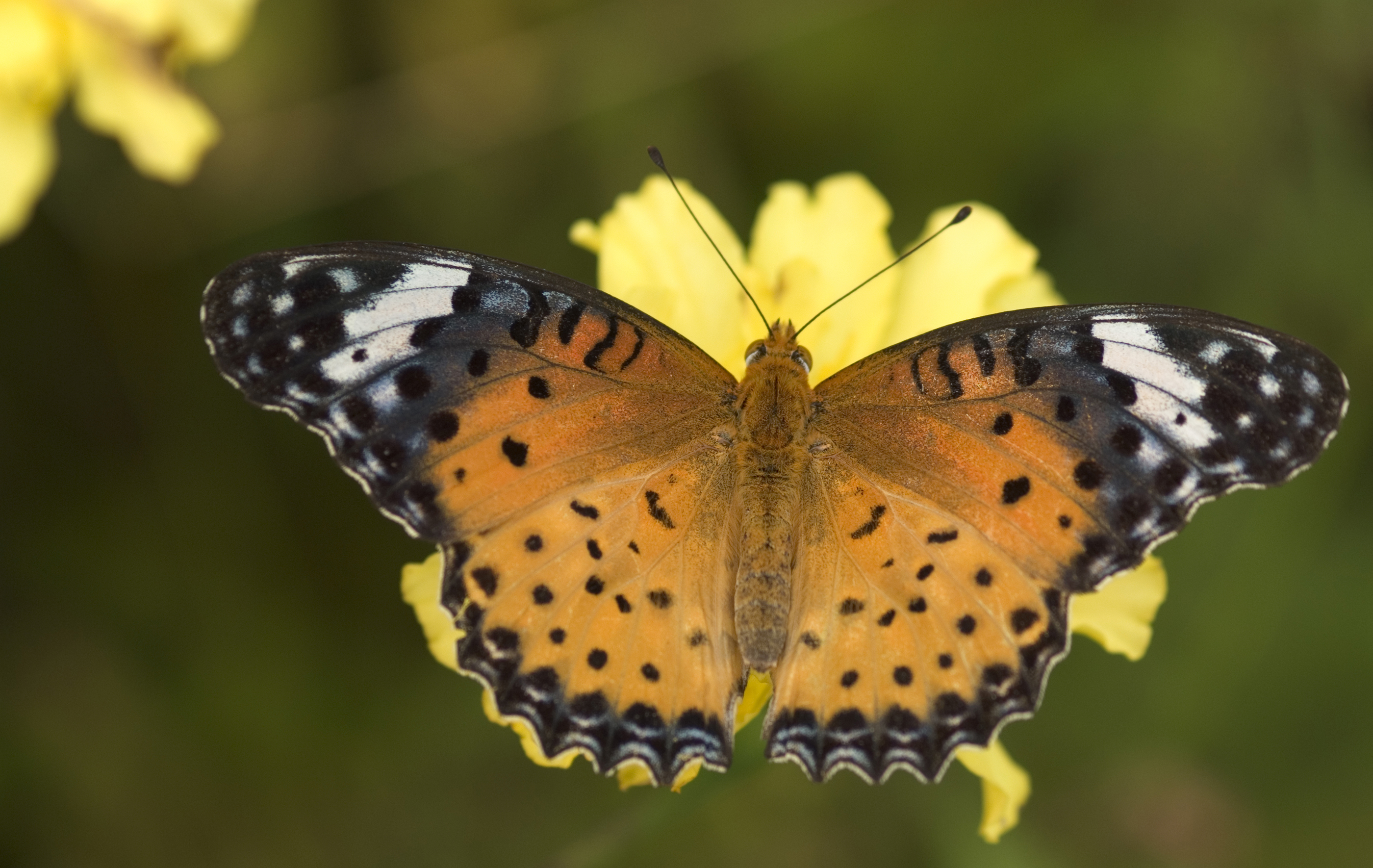
Argynnis butterfly

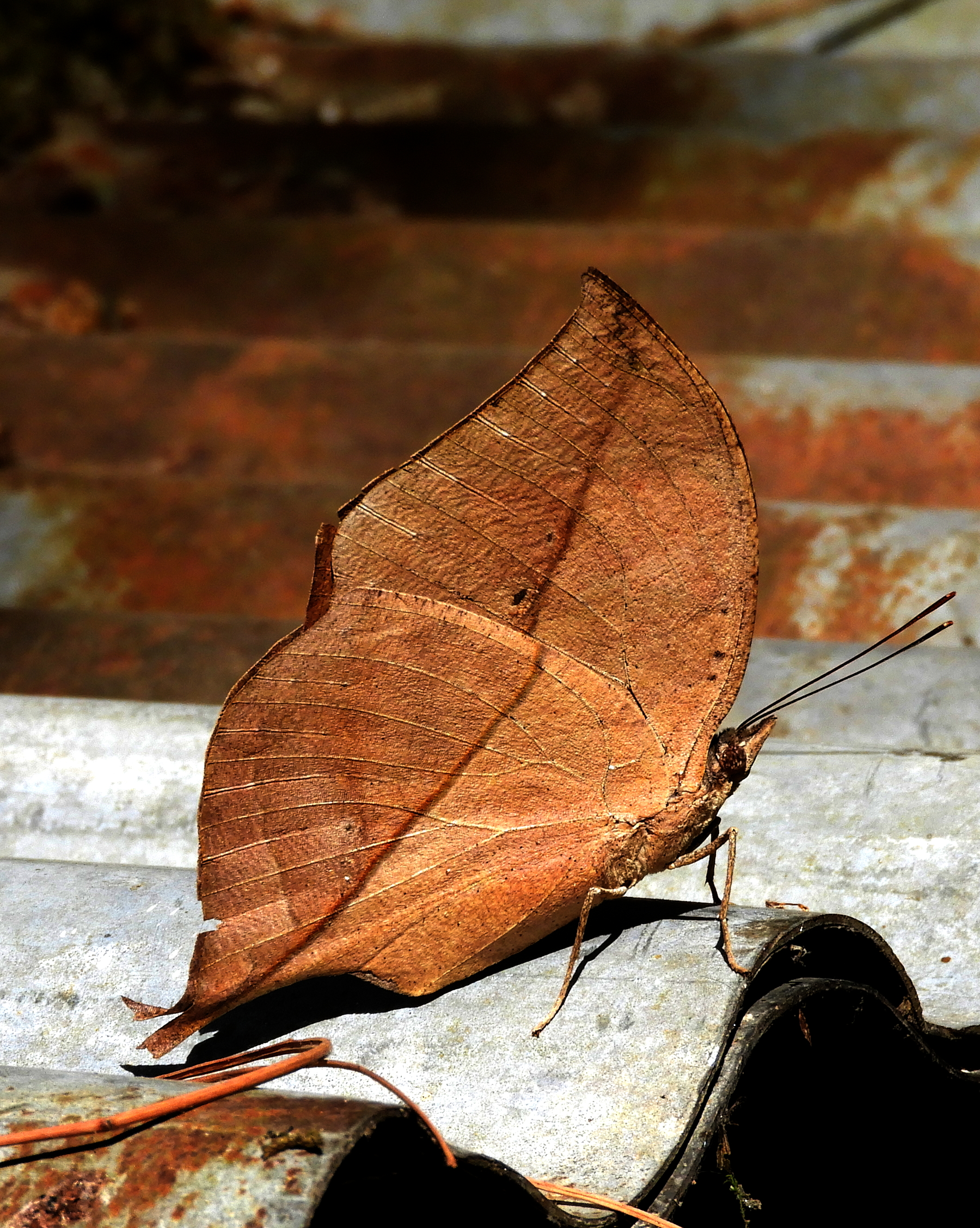
Indian oakleaf or dead leaf at Sattal

Some of the butterflies found at Sattal includes Indian Fritillary (Argynnis hyperbius), Peacock Pansy (Junonia almana), Blue Peacock (Papilio arcturus), Paris Peacock (Papilio paris), Red-base Jazebel (Delias pasithoe), Red lacewing (Cethosia biblis), Yellow Pansy (Junonia hierta), Tawny Rajah (Charaxes bernardus), Red Helen (Papilio helenus), Large silverstripe (Argynnis childreni), Indian oakleaf (Kallima inachus) and thousands of others. The forests also homes one of the largest moth in the world, the Atlas moth (Attacus atlas) . The Atlas moth is one of the largest lepidopterans, with a wingspan measuring up to 24 cm (9.4 in) and a wing surface area of about 160 cm^{2} (~25 in^{2}). It is only surpassed in wingspan by the white witch (Thysania agrippina) and Attacus caesar, and in wing surface area by the Hercules moth (Coscinocera hercules). As in most Lepidoptera, females are noticeably larger and heavier than males, while males have broader antennae.

== Adventure and excursions ==
=== Butterfly museum ===
There is a butterfly museum built by Frederic Smetacek Sr at Jones Estate, now Peter Smatacek is continuing the research, which has over 2500 butterfly and moth specimens and 1100 species of insects that are found in this region.

=== Sattal Mission Estate and Methodist Ashram ===
The Sattal Christian Ashram was established by E. Stanley Jones (1884-1973), the evangelist and missionary. This Christian Ashram is situated on the banks of Sattal lakes, on a former tea estate. St. John's Church is part of this ashram and showcases a mixed colonial architecture. There is also a Sattal Christian Ashram chapel situated nearby. It was established in 1930 to introduce Christianity into the Kumaun region of Uttarakhand.

=== Subhash Dhara ===
There is a natural spring of fresh water arising out of dense oak forest west of Sattal that leads to a waterfall beyond the Sukhatal also known as the Bharat tal.

== Seven Lakes Of Sattal ==
- Panna Tal or Garud Tal
- Naldamyanti Tal
- Hanuman Tal
- Sita Tal
- Ram Tal
- Laxman Tal
- Sukha Tal or Bharat Tal

== Image of birds species at Sattal ==
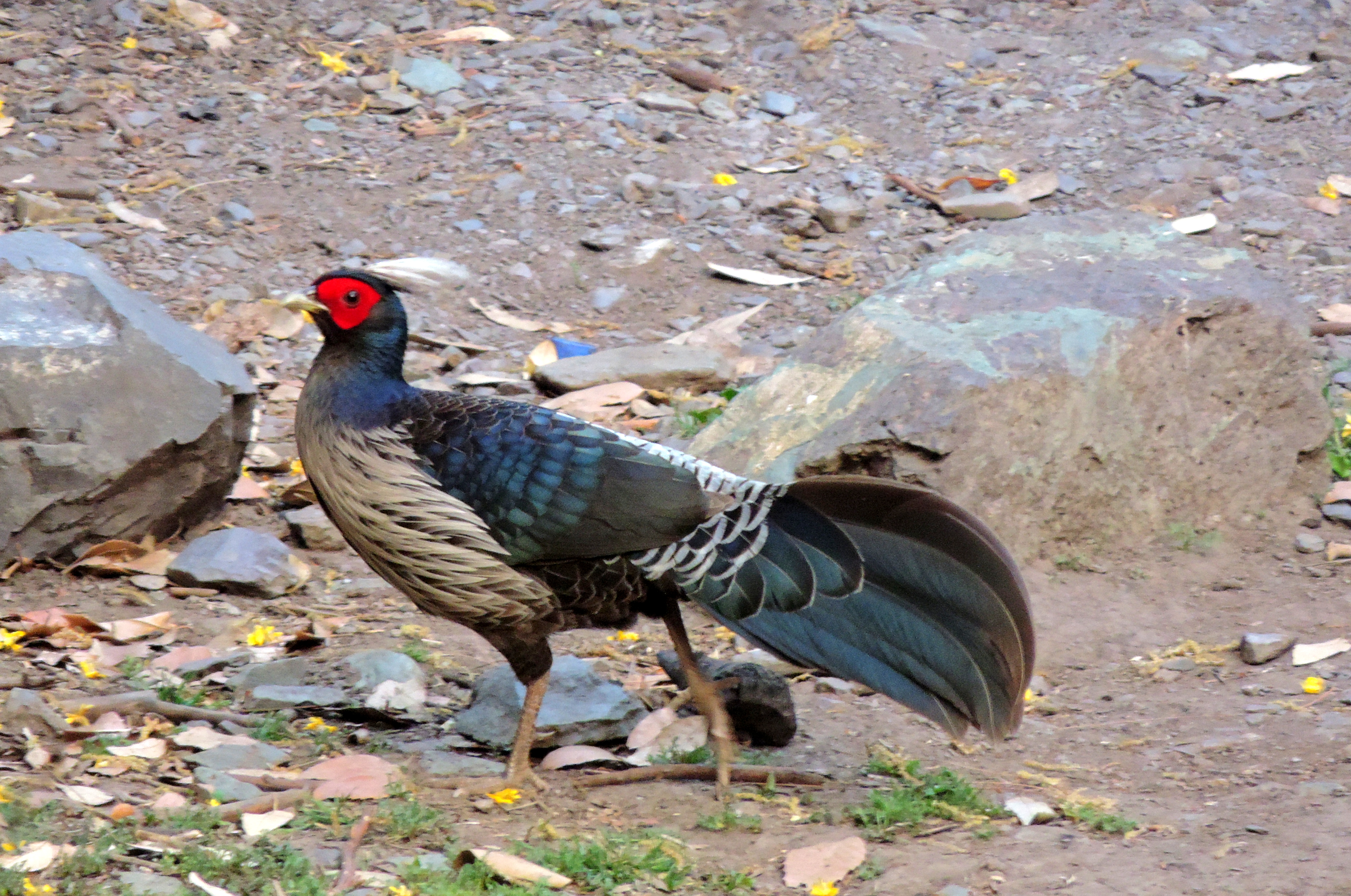
Kalij pheasant male

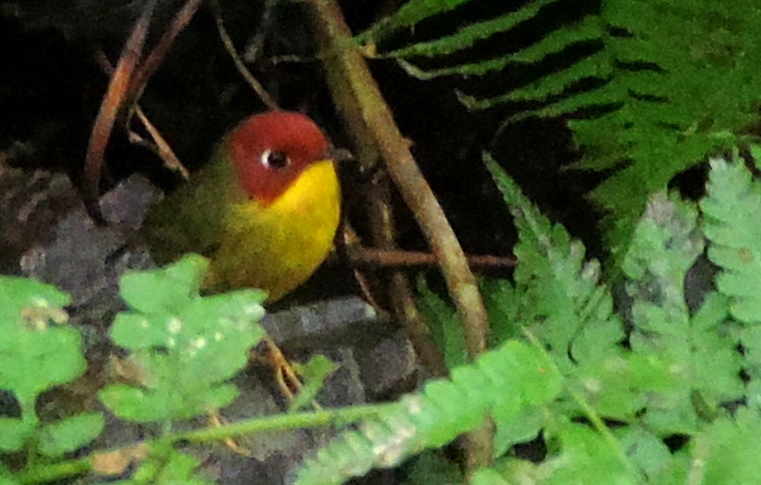
Chestnut Headed Tesia

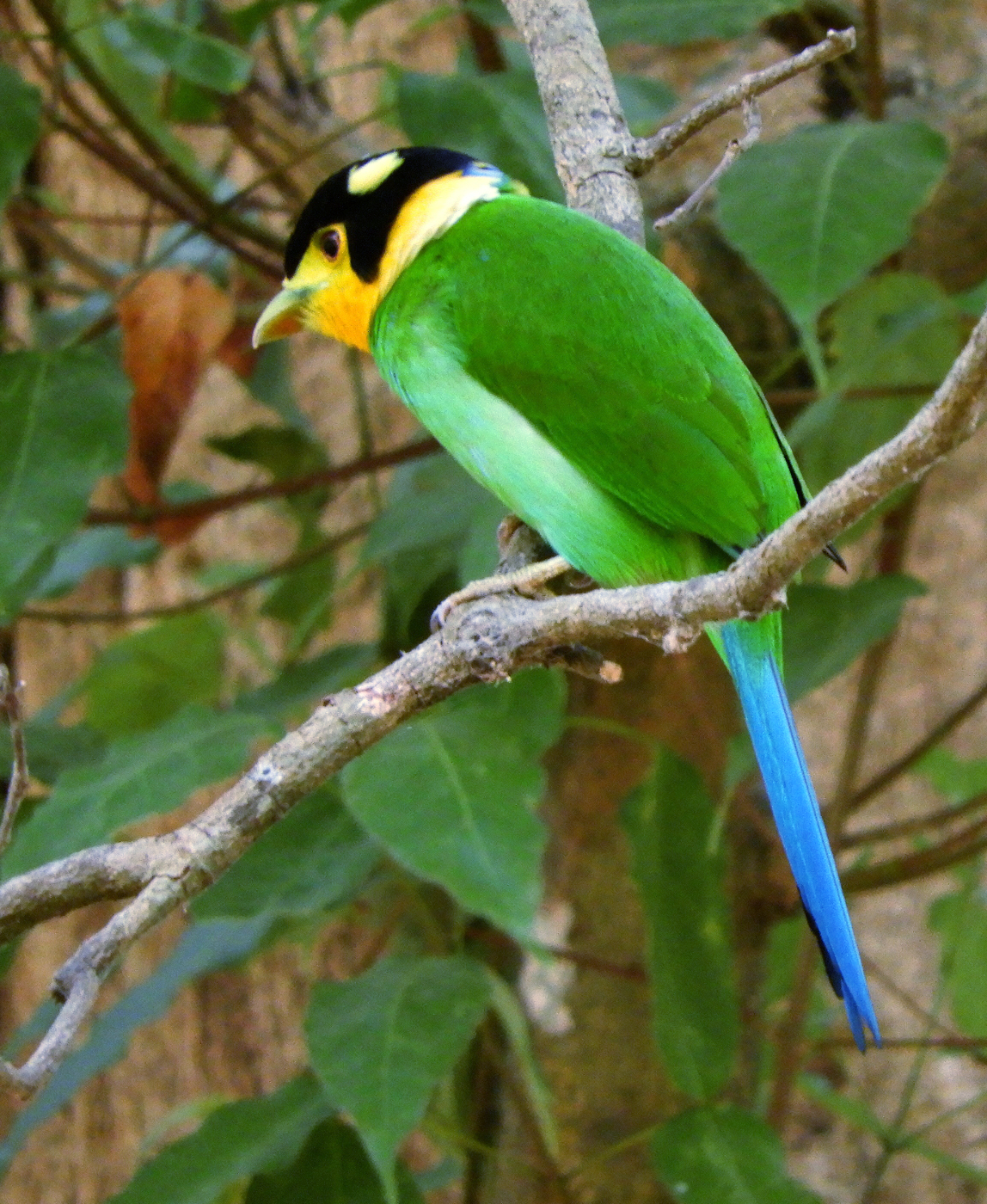
Long-tailed Broadbill

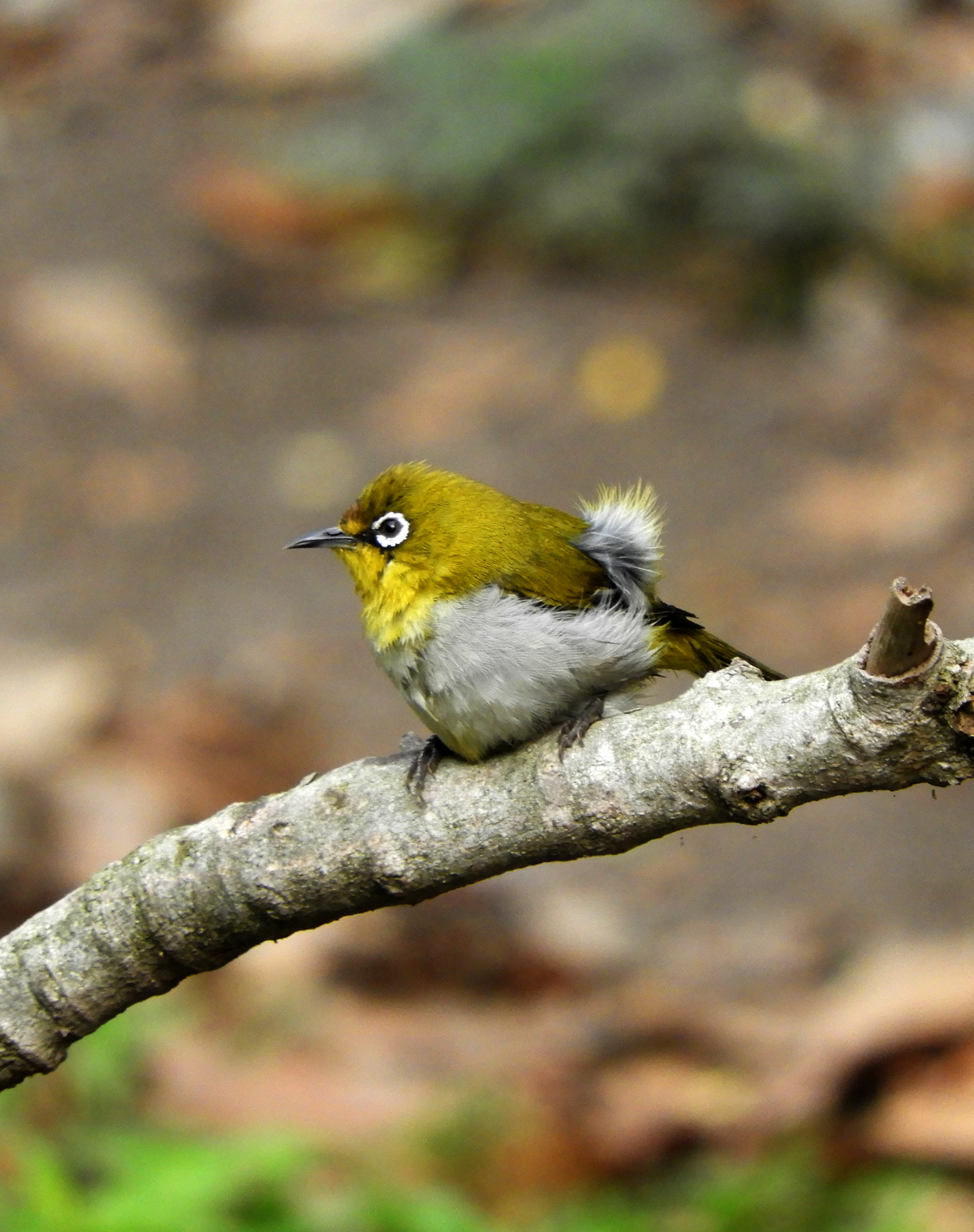
Oriental white-eye

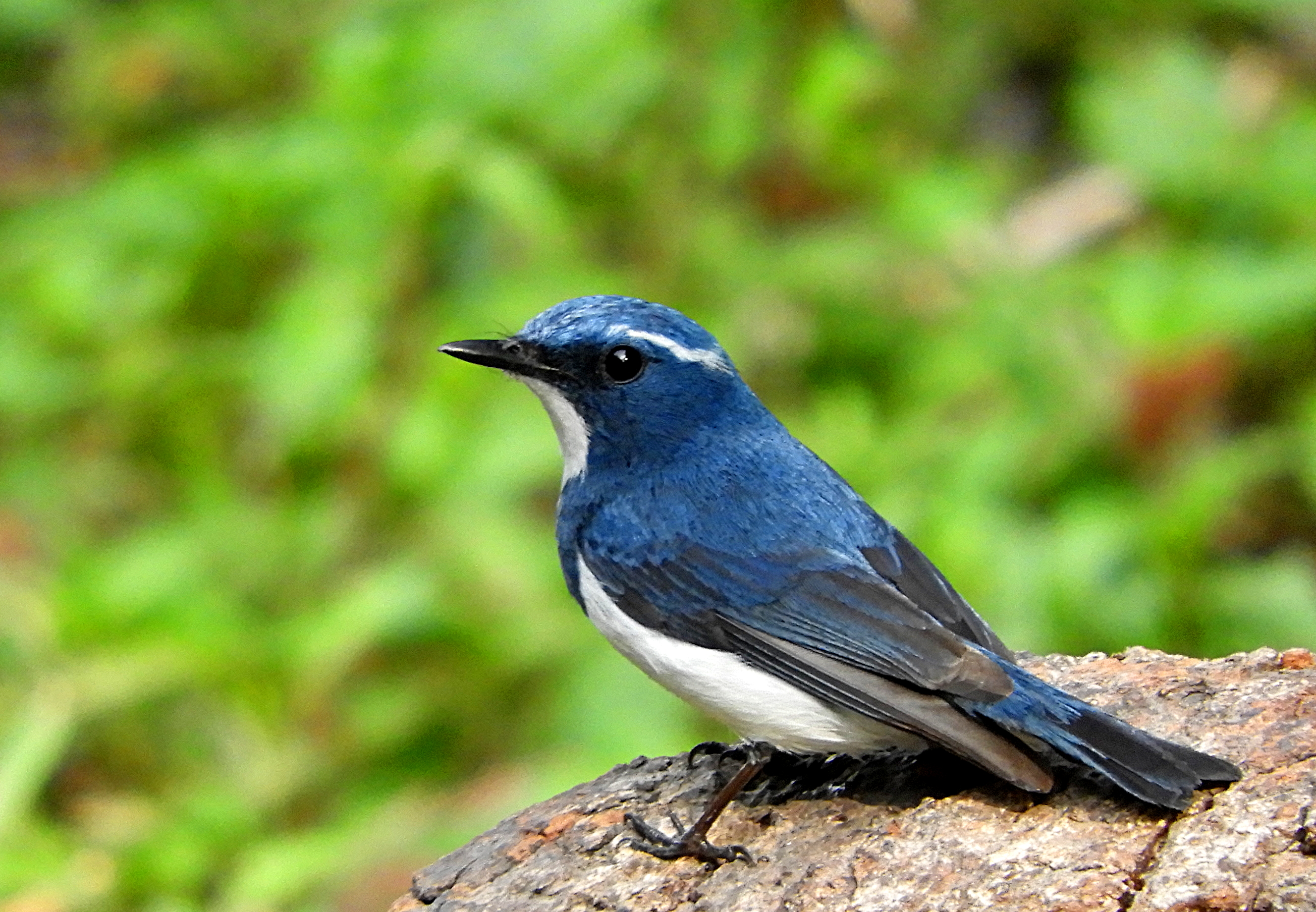
Ultramarine flycatcher

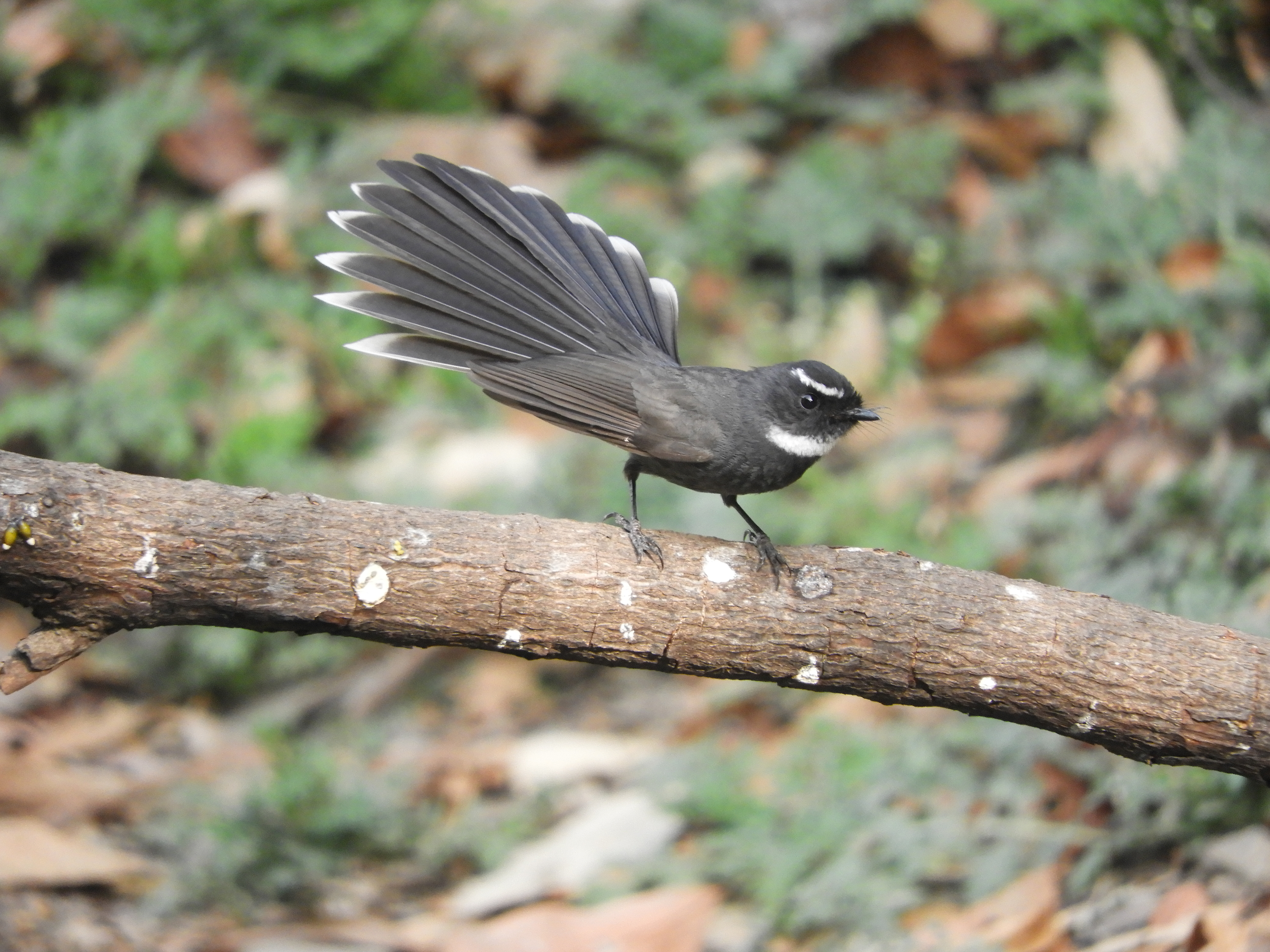
White-throated fantail

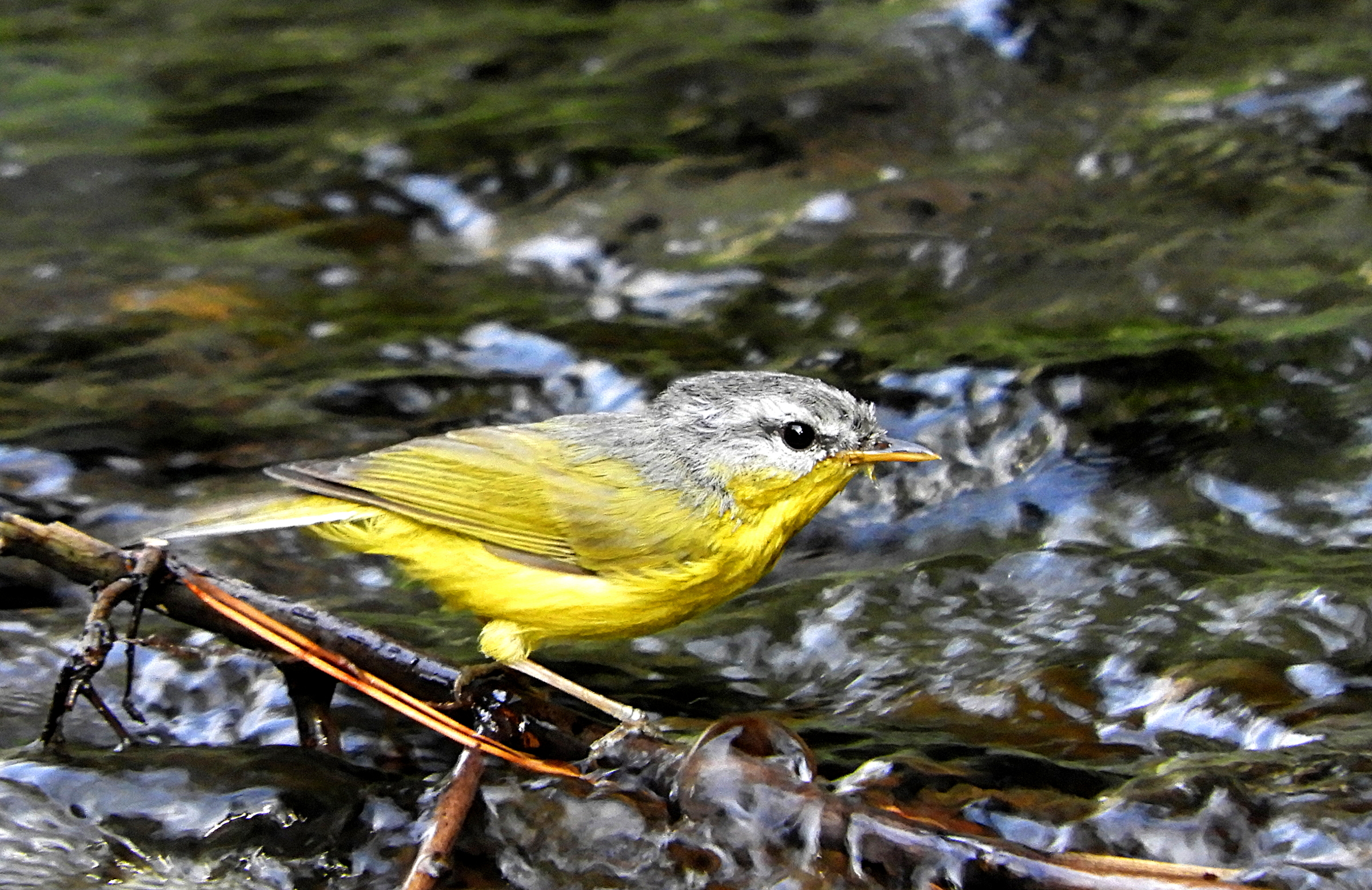
Grey-hooded warbler

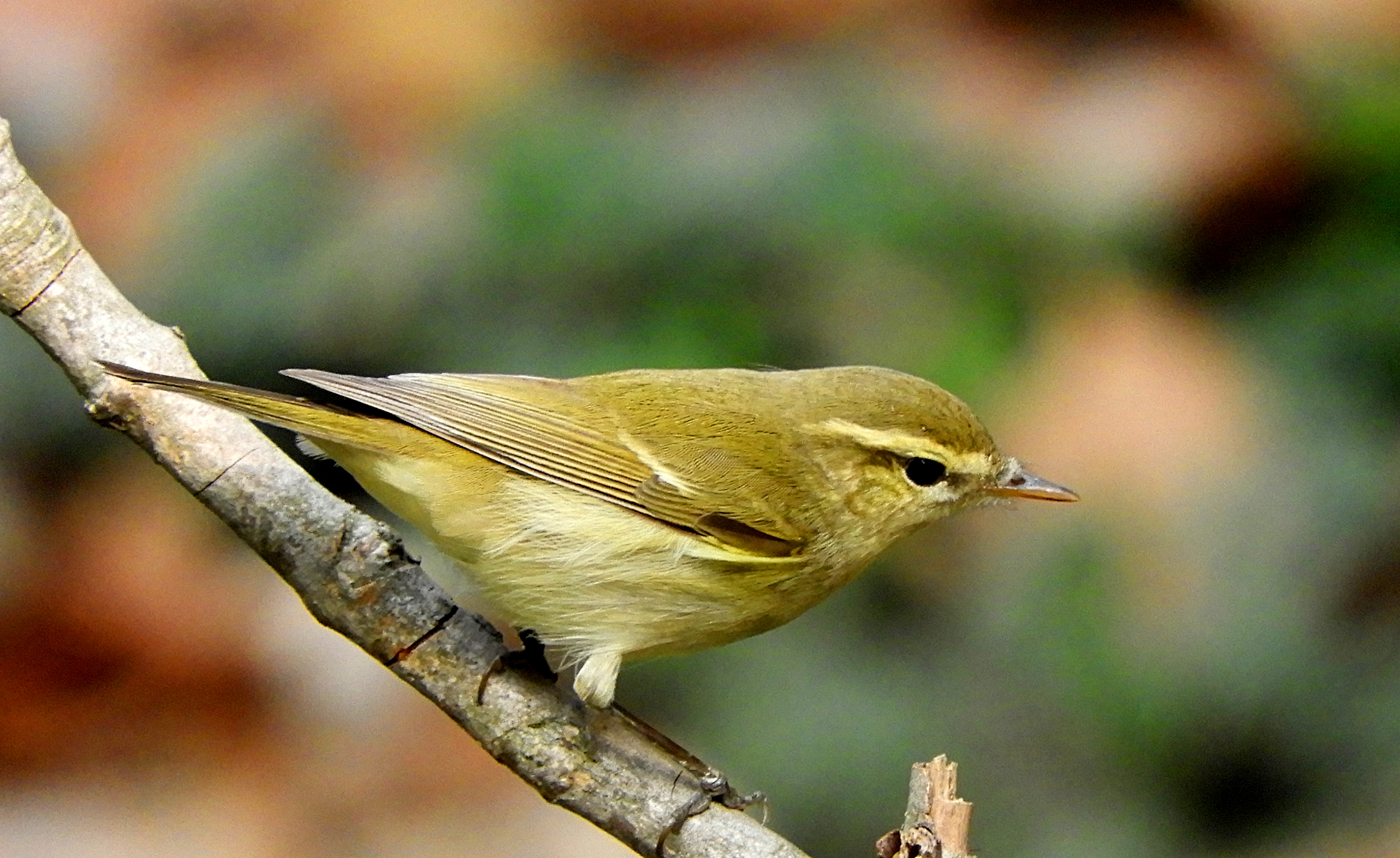
Greenish Warbler

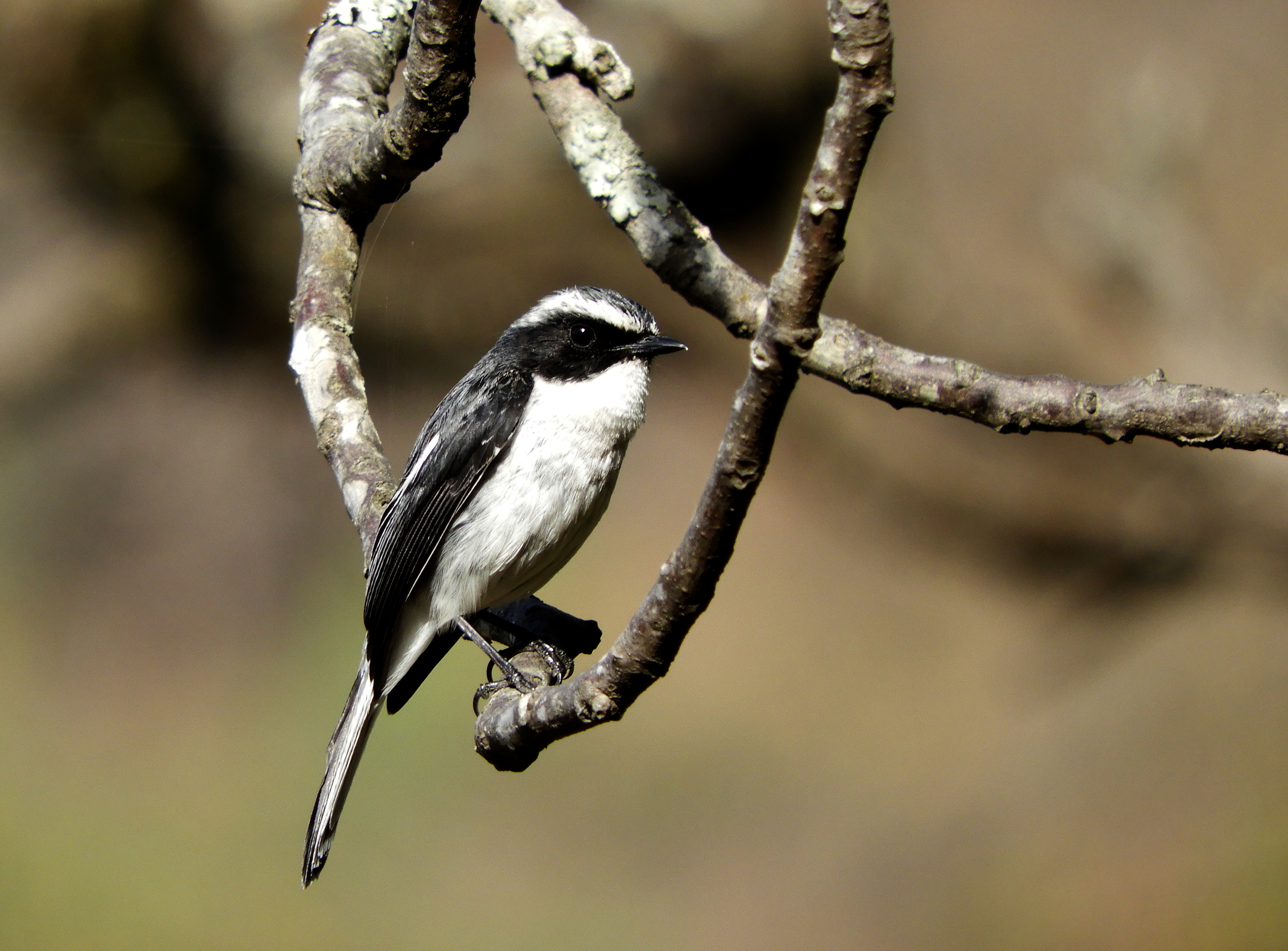
Grey Bushchat

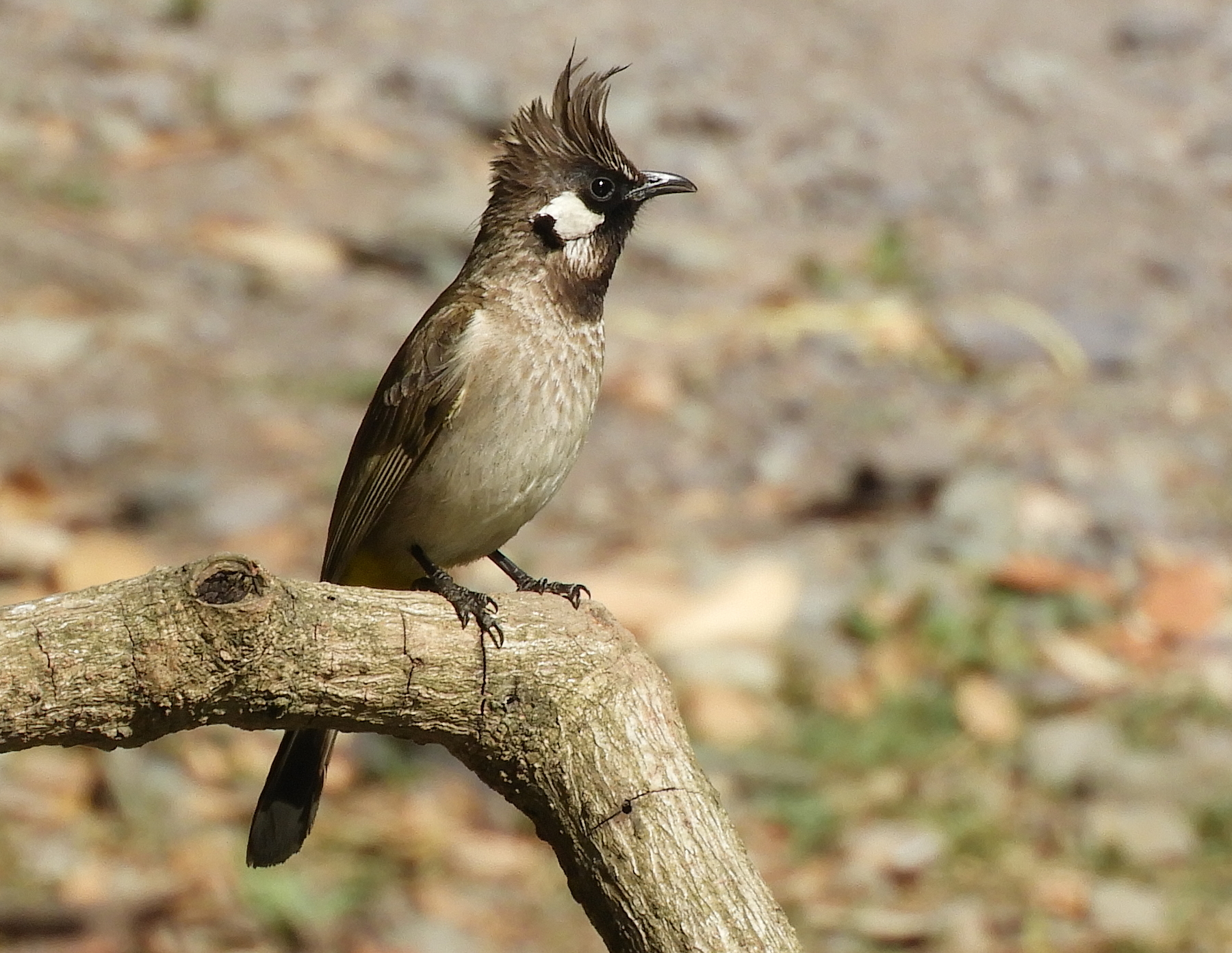
Himalayan Bulbul

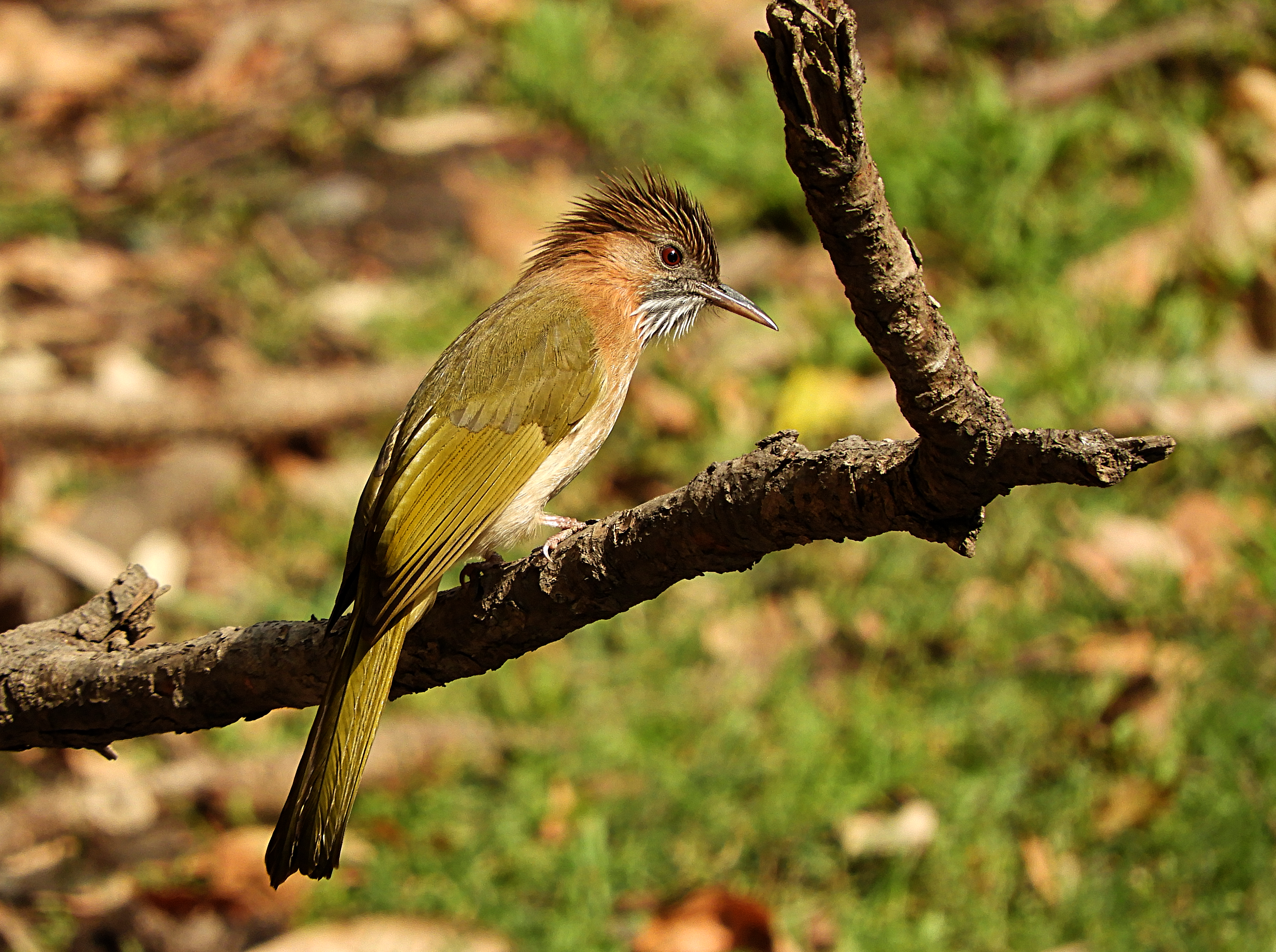
Mountain Bulbul

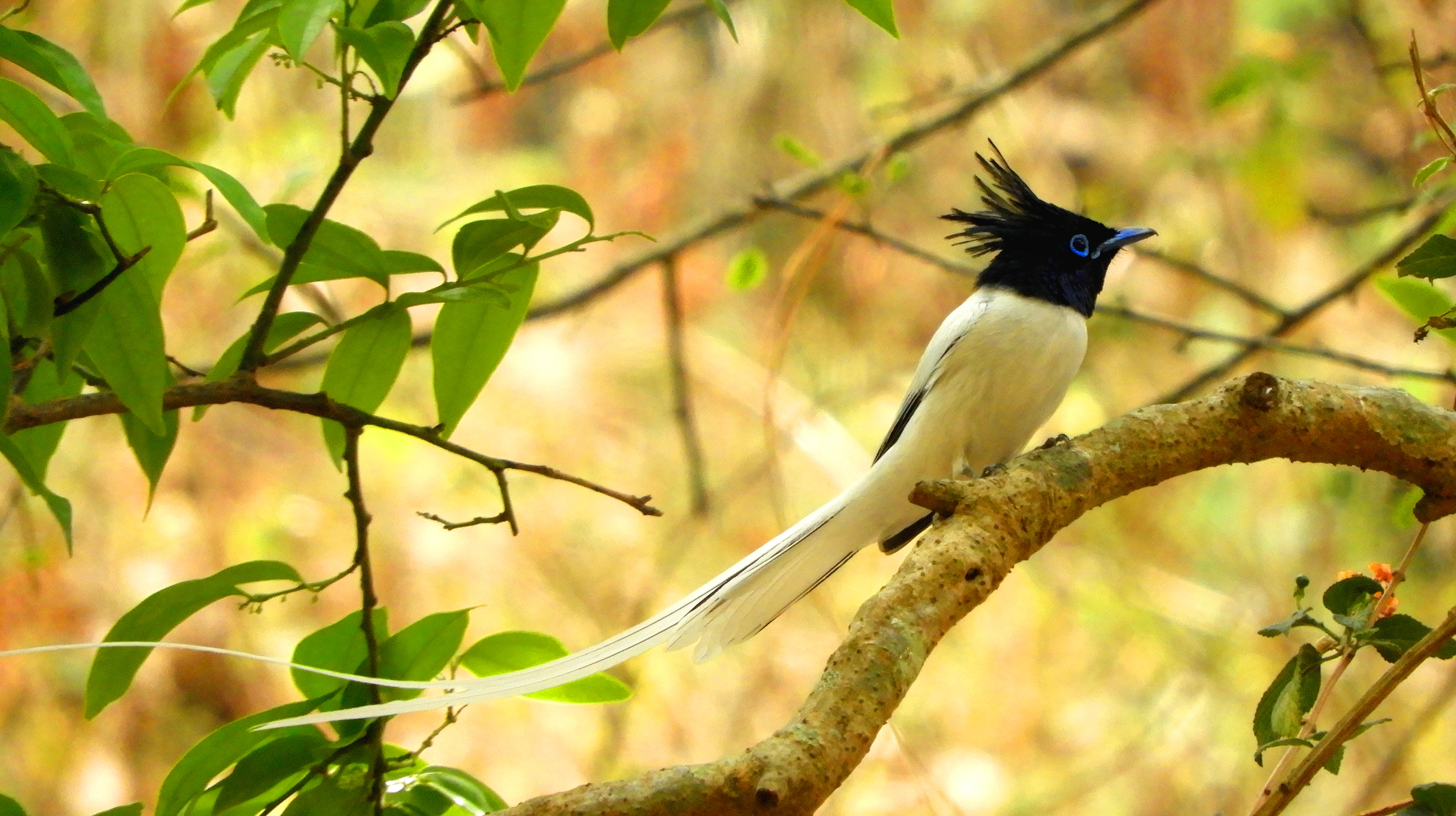
Indian paradise flycatcher

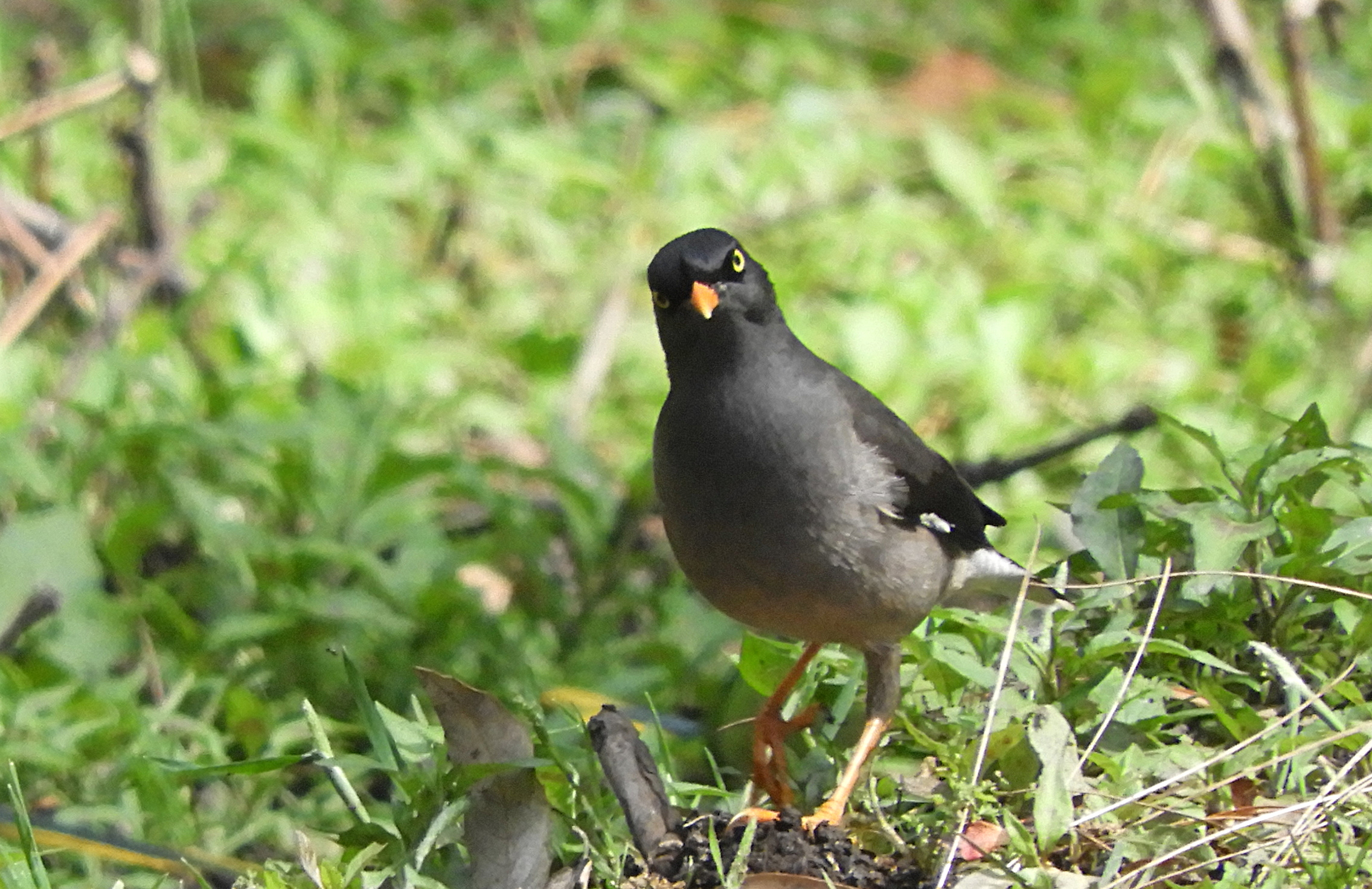
Jungle Myna

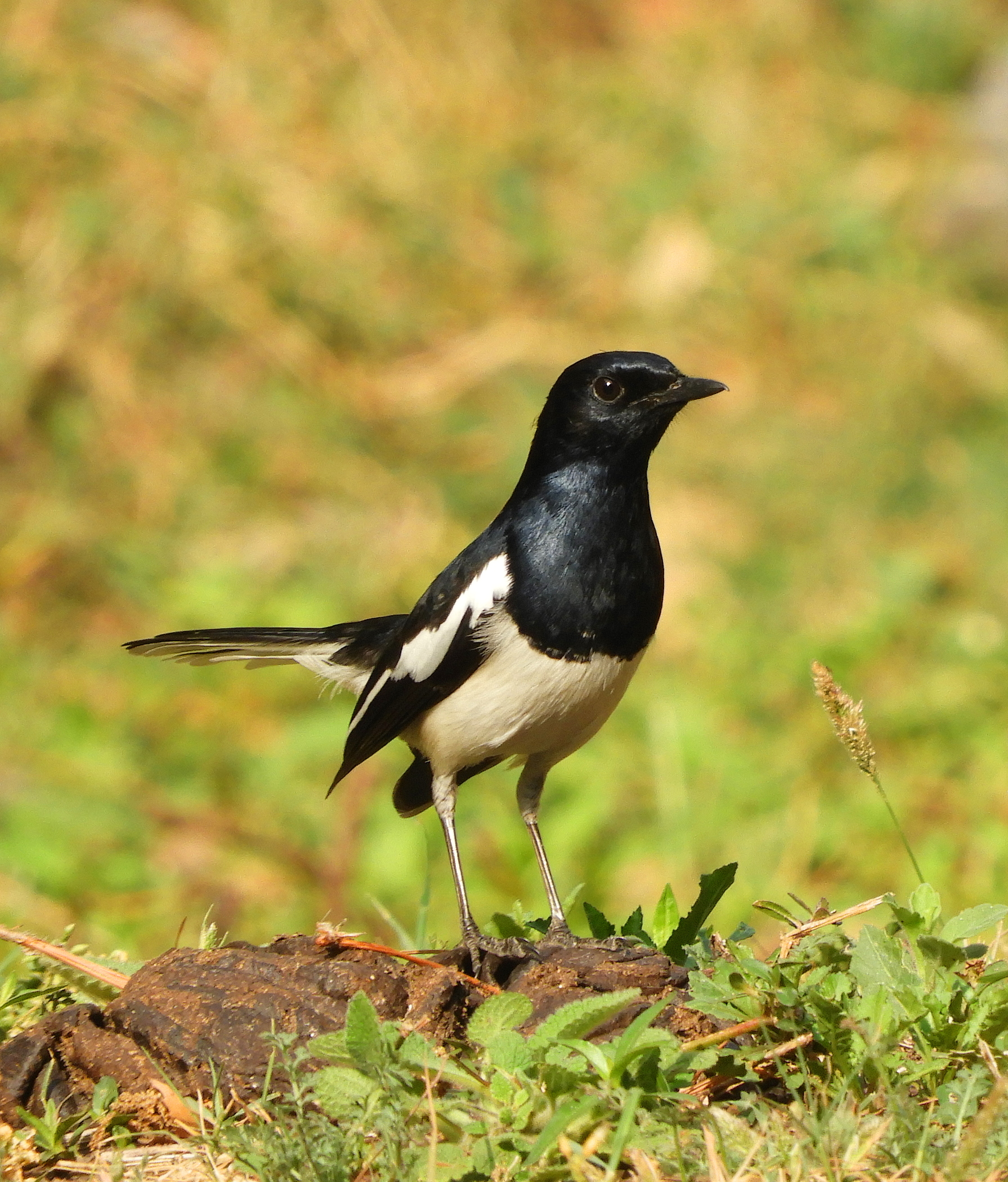
Oriental Magpie-Robin

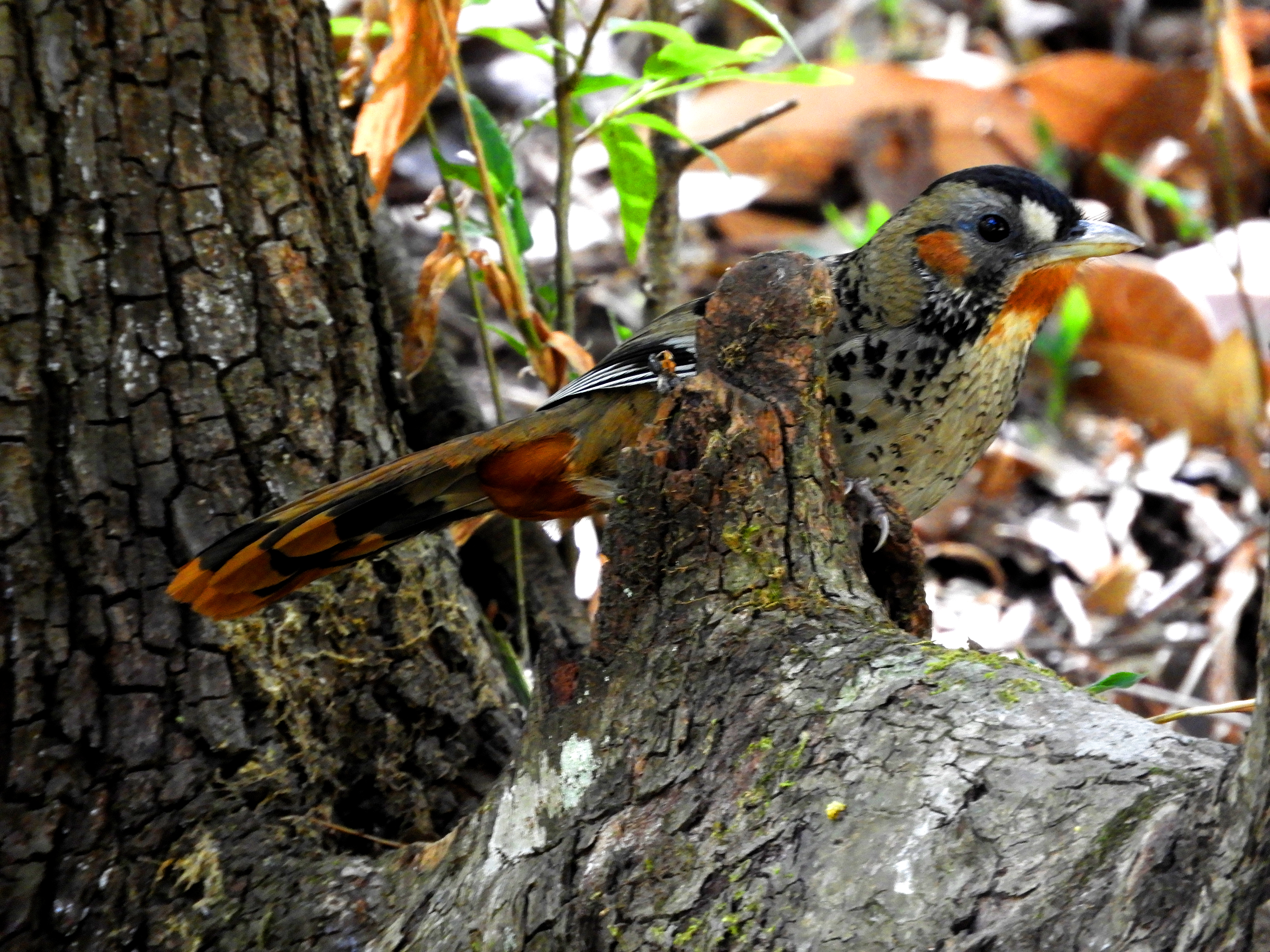
Rufous-chinned Laughingthrush

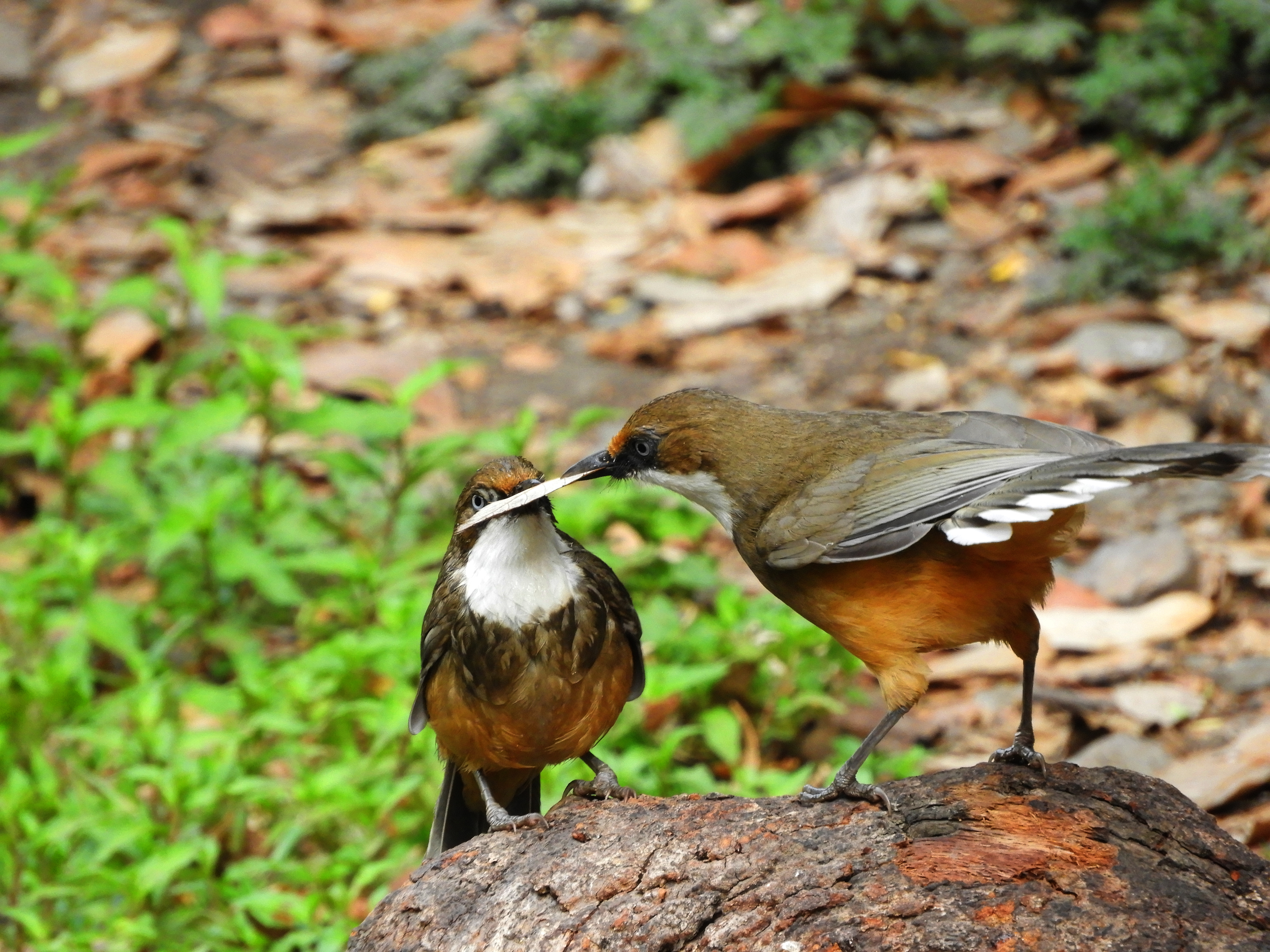
White-throated Laughingthrush

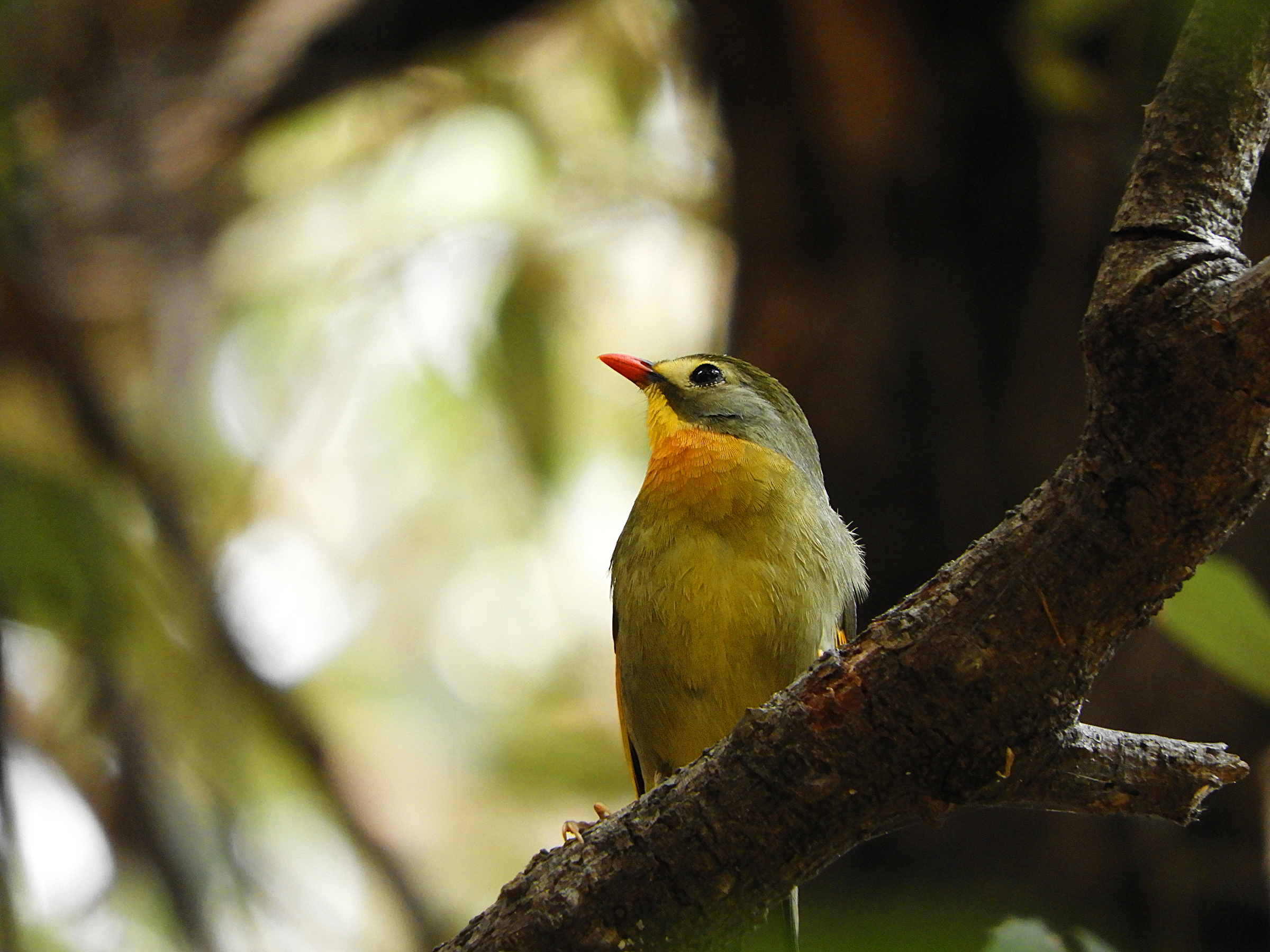
Red-billed leiothrix

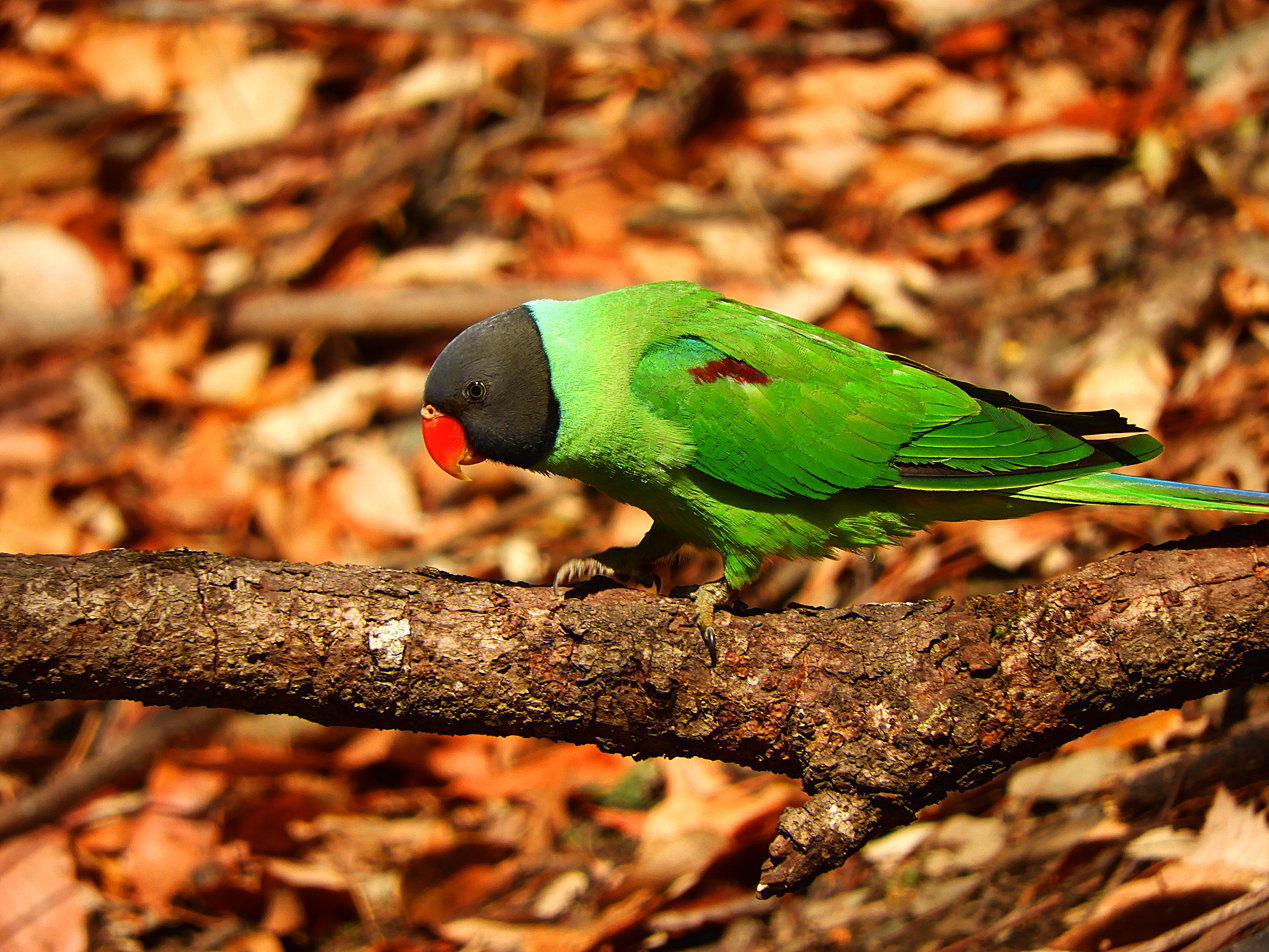
Slaty-headed parakeet

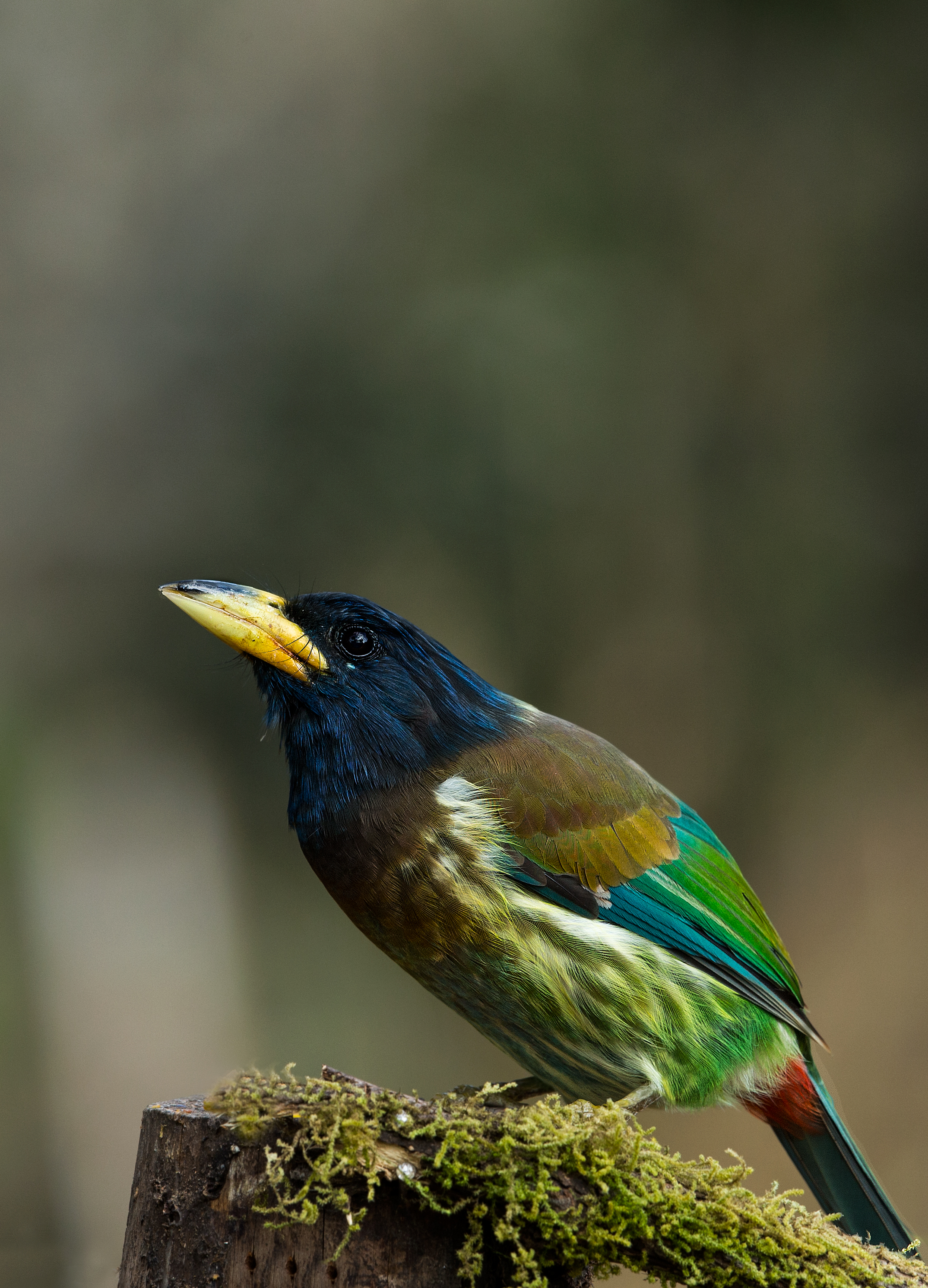
Great Barbet

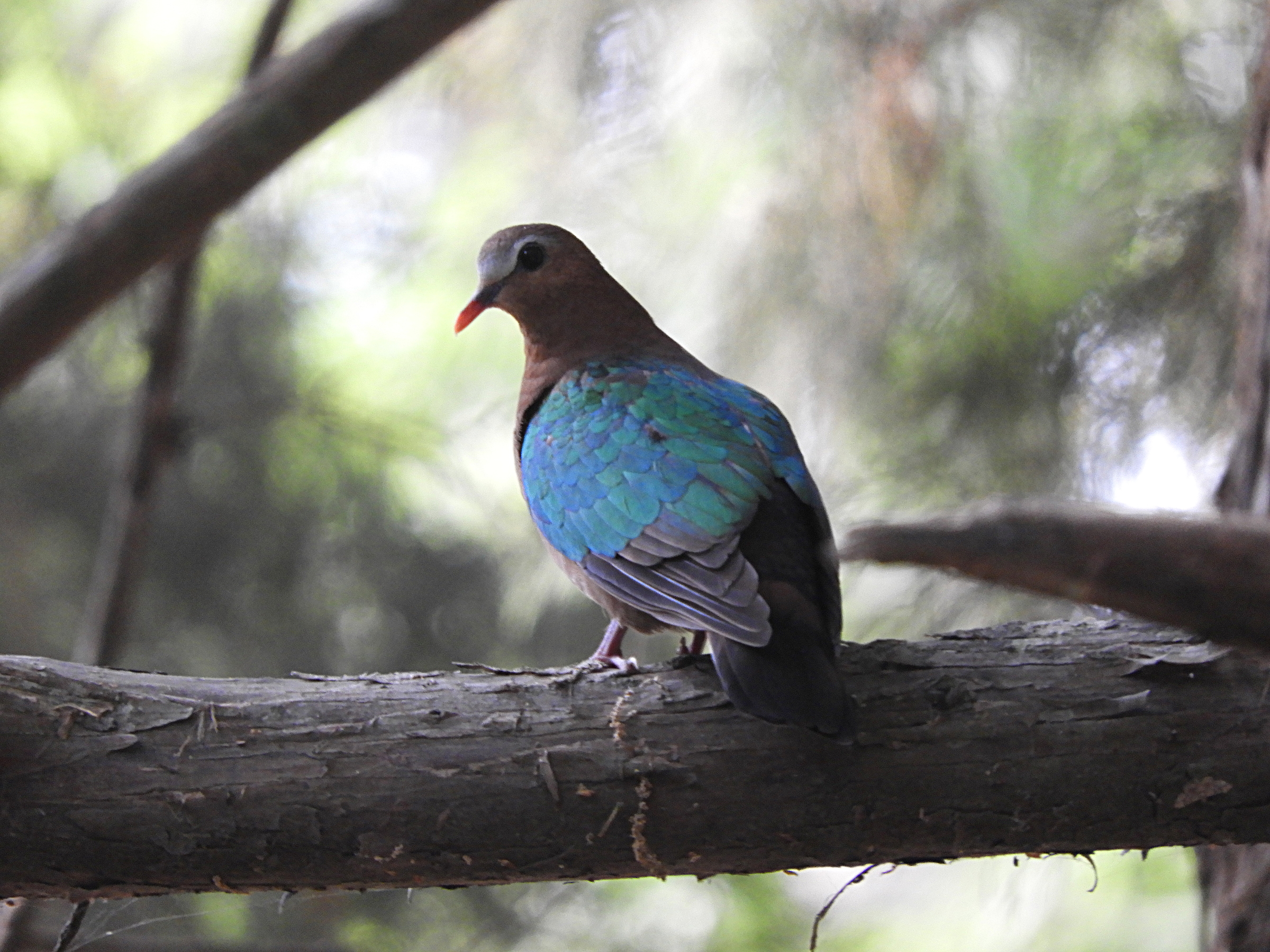
Common Emerald Dove

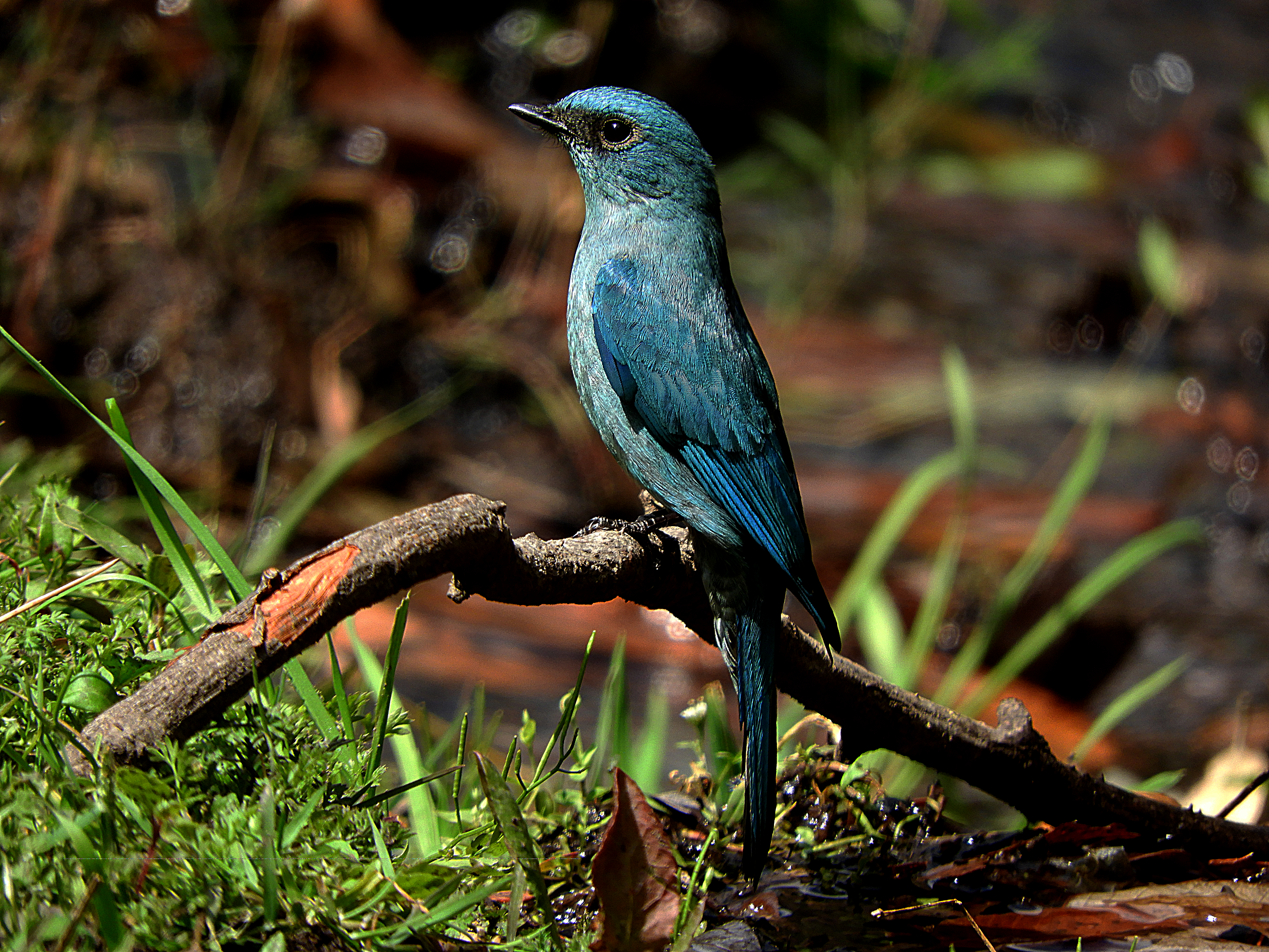
Verditer Flycatcher Female

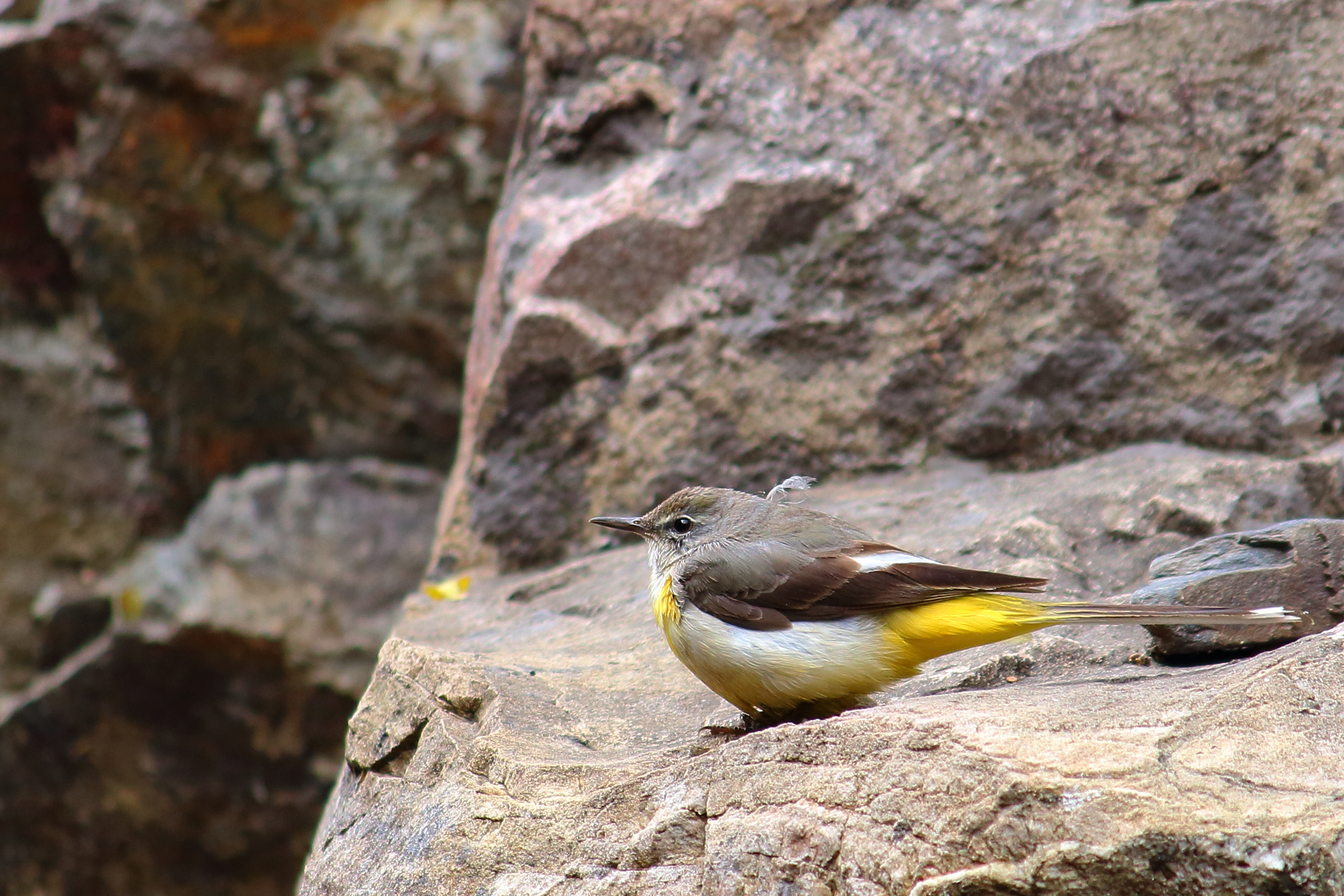
Wagtail

== Nearby Places of Interest ==
- Town of Bhimtal
- Town of Bhowali
- NaukuchiaTal (Nine-Cornered Lake)
- Ghorakhal
- Golu Devata Temple
- Nainital
