= Golu =

Golu may refer to:

- Golu (festival), a festive display of dolls and figurines in South India
- Golu Devata, a deity of the Kumaoni community of India
- Golu Hadawatha, a 1968 Sinhalese language romance film
