= Sainik School Ghorakhal =

Military residential school in Nainital district, Uttarakhand, India

- सैनिक स्कूल घोड़ाखाल

- Main academic building of Sainik School Ghorakhal

Location
- Ghorakhal, near Bhowali; Uttarakhand; India; 29.3793°N 79.5424°E

Information
- Type: Military residential school
- Motto: बुद्धिर्यस्य बलं तस्य (Buddhiryasya Balam Tasya) (Wisdom brings Strength)
- Established: March 21, 1966; 60 years ago
- Founder: Wing Commander Jaimal Singh
- School board: Ministry of Defence, Government of India
- Principal: Group Captain Madhu Senger
- Grades: Classes VI to XII (6 to 12)
- Gender: Co-educational
- Enrollment: ~550
- Campus size: 500 acres (202 ha)
- Campus type: Residential public school
- Affiliation: CBSE
- Elevation: 1,800 metres (5,906 ft)
- Website: ssghorakhal.org

Sainik School Ghorakhal (SSG) is an English-medium, military boarding school situated at Ghorakhal, near Bhowali in the Nainital district of Uttarakhand, India. Established on 21 March 1966 under the aegis of the Sainik Schools Society, Ministry of Defence, the institution is positioned on a 500-acre colonial-era estate in the Outer Lesser Himalayas at an altitude of 1,800 metres (6,000 feet) above mean sea level.

The primary objective of the school is to prepare cadets academically, physically, and psychologically for entry into the officer cadre of the Indian Armed Forces through the National Defence Academy (NDA), Khadakwasla, and the Indian Naval Academy (INA), Ezhimala. Sainik School Ghorakhal holds the national record for winning the prestigious Raksha Mantri Trophy ten times since 2000, awarded annually to the Sainik School contributing the highest number of cadets to the NDA.

== History and estate ==
The estate of Ghorakhal possesses a heritage dating to the nineteenth century. Following the Indian Rebellion of 1857, the British Crown granted the 500-acre forested property to General Sir Hugh Wheeler in 1870. In 1921, the estate was purchased by Major General Sir Syed Mohammed Hamid Ali Khan Bahadur, the Nawab of Rampur, who constructed summer palaces, private residences, and developed terraced fruit orchards across the slopes.

Following Indian independence and the subsequent abolition of privy purses, the Government of Uttar Pradesh acquired the estate from the Rampur royal family in March 1964 for public educational development. Under the national initiative conceived by Defence Minister V. K. Krishna Menon to establish feeder schools across Indian states, Sainik School Ghorakhal was formally inaugurated on 21 March 1966. Wing Commander Jaimal Singh of the Indian Air Force served as the founding principal, organizing the initial cadet batches, carving academic buildings from the palace structures, and laying the sports grounds.

The school observed its Golden Jubilee in May 2016, marking fifty years of military and academic training with alumni congregations and commemorative ceremonies. In August 2026, the school expanded its residential facilities with the commissioning of the Bachendri Pal girls' hostel block by the Union Minister of State for Defence, supporting the phased induction of female cadets into the Sainik School system.

== Toponymy ==
The name Ghorakhal is derived from the regional Hindi and Kumaoni words ghora (meaning horse) and khal (signifying a mountain pond, saddle depression, or stream catchment). Local accounts attribute the name to a historical incident during the nineteenth century when a cavalry horse, having traversed the mountain passes from Awadh, collapsed beside a natural freshwater depression in the basin. In regional military vernacular, students and alumni of the institution are referred to as Ghorakhalis or Ghoras.

== Campus and infrastructure ==
The school campus covers 500 acres of ridge terrain at an elevation of 1,800 metres, surrounded by dense stands of Banj oak, Chir pine, and Buransh. The property is situated 4 kilometres from Bhowali, 16 kilometres from the district headquarters at Nainital, and 40 kilometres from the railway terminus at Kathgodam.

Academic Infrastructure
The main academic block accommodates digital classrooms, science laboratories (Physics, Chemistry, and Biology), computer centres, language labs, and a central library housing over 15,000 volumes. The Ratandeep Auditorium serves as the venue for assemblies, cultural events, and guest lectures.

Sports and Physical Training
The school maintains extensive sports grounds, including the Jaimal Singh Multipurpose Stadium, the Gola Ground for football, four outdoor basketball courts, two volleyball courts, a lawn tennis court, a half-Olympic-sized swimming pool, and an indoor sports complex containing badminton, table tennis, squash, and billiards courts. Cadets undergo regular obstacle-course training, endurance cross-country runs across hilly trails, and military drill on the parade ground.

Medical and Civic Amenities
A 20-bed hospital staffed by a resident Medical Officer and nursing staff provides medical care. The campus includes a CSD Canteen, a central dining hall with a mechanized kitchen catering to 600 diners, staff residential quarters, a guest house, and a dedicated military helipad utilized for VIP and defence aviation transport.

Shyamkhet Tea Estate
A tract of school land is leased to the Uttarakhand Tea Development Board for tea cultivation, functioning as the Shyamkhet Organic Tea Garden and processing factory.

== Academic curriculum and military orientation ==
Sainik School Ghorakhal is affiliated with the Central Board of Secondary Education (CBSE), New Delhi (Affiliation No: 3580002, School No: 84013), and adheres to the All India Senior School Certificate Examination (AISSCE) curriculum.

The institution offers education from Class VI to Class XII. In Classes XI and XII, the academic curriculum focuses exclusively on the Science stream (Physics, Chemistry, Mathematics, Biology, and Computer Science), structured to align with the competitive examination requirements of the Union Public Service Commission (UPSC) for the NDA.

Cadets follow a regimented daily routine combining academic instruction, physical training, mandatory games, prep study sessions, and character-building activities. Participation in the National Cadet Corps (NCC) is compulsory for all students, with regular camps, firing training, map reading, and leadership workshops organized throughout the academic year.

== House system ==
Residential life at the school is organized around a house system designed to cultivate camaraderie, leadership, and athletic competition.

Cadets are allocated to senior and junior holding houses, each supervised by a Housemaster (faculty member) and an Assistant Housemaster, with hostel operations managed by a resident Hostel Superintendent.

House Organization at Sainik School Ghorakhal
House Name	Category	House Colour
Singh House	Senior House	Red
Kumaon House	Senior House	Green
Kesari House	Senior House	Blue
Shiwalik House	Senior House	Yellow
Abhimanyu House	Junior Holding House	Divisional Flag
Bharat House	Junior Holding House	Divisional Flag
Luv House	Junior Holding House	Divisional Flag
Kush House	Junior Holding House	Divisional Flag
Dhruv House	Junior Holding House	Divisional Flag
Bachendri Hostel	Girls Residential Wing	Institutional Flag

Houses compete throughout the year for prestigious inter-house trophies in academics, cross-country championships, athletics, boxing, debate, dramatics, and drill.

== National Defence Academy feeder record ==
Sainik School Ghorakhal is noted for its high rate of cadet entry into the armed forces officer cadre. Over 800 alumni from the school have been commissioned as officers in the Indian Army, Indian Navy, and Indian Air Force.

The school has been awarded the Raksha Mantri Trophy ten times, a national record across all 33 Sainik Schools in India. The trophy, instituted by the Ministry of Defence, is conferred upon the institution that achieves the highest aggregate selection into the National Defence Academy and Indian Naval Academy in a single academic year.

== Admissions and reservation policy ==
Admission to Sainik School Ghorakhal is conducted strictly on merit through the All India Sainik Schools Entrance Examination (AISSEE), administered nationally by the National Testing Agency (NTA).

Admissions are open at two entry points:

Class VI Entry
Candidates must be between 10 and 12 years of age as of 31 March of the admission year. Both boys and girls are eligible for admission.
Class IX Entry
Candidates must be between 13 and 15 years of age as of 31 March of the admission year, with admission open to male candidates.

=== Reservation framework ===
The seat matrix conforms to statutory Ministry of Defence regulations:

- 67 percent of total available seats are reserved for candidates belonging to the Home State (Uttarakhand).
- 33 percent of total seats are open to candidates from other Indian States and Union Territories.
- Within each regional pool, statutory reservations apply: 15 percent for Scheduled Castes (SC), 7.5 percent for Scheduled Tribes (ST), and 27 percent for Other Backward Classes (Non-Creamy Layer).
- 25 percent of the remaining seats are allocated to children of serving and retired Armed Forces personnel.
- 10 percent of total vacancies or 10 seats (whichever is higher) in Class VI are reserved for female cadets.

=== Scholarships ===
Cadets from Uttarakhand receive merit-cum-means financial assistance and tuition fee waivers funded by the Government of Uttarakhand. The Ministry of Defence provides central financial support and scholarships to the wards of serving, retired, and disabled Junior Commissioned Officers (JCOs), Non-Commissioned Officers (NCOs), and soldiers of other ranks.

== Governance and administration ==
The governance of Sainik School Ghorakhal is structured within the three-tier administrative framework of the Sainik Schools Society:

Board of Governors
The apex policy-making body, chaired by the Union Defence Minister, with the Chief Minister or Education Minister of Uttarakhand, senior military commanders, and defence education experts serving as members.

Local Board of Administration (LBA)
Supervises campus infrastructure development, budgetary allocations, and administrative operations. The General Officer Commanding (GOC), Uttar Bharat Area, serves as the Chairman of the LBA.

Executive Leadership
The school is administered by senior serving officers from the Indian Armed Forces deputed by the Ministry of Defence:

- Principal (Rank of Group Captain / Colonel / Captain IN)
- Vice Principal (Rank of Wing Commander / Lieutenant Colonel / Commander IN)
- Administrative Officer (Rank of Squadron Leader / Major / Lieutenant Commander IN)

== Notable alumni ==
Distinguished Alumni of Sainik School Ghorakhal
Name	Notable Role / Appointment	Honours / Decorations
Lieutenant General Manoj Kumar Katiyar	General Officer Commanding-in-Chief Western Command; former Director General of Military Operations (DGMO)	PVSM, UYSM, AVSM
Vice Admiral H. C. S. Bisht	Former Flag Officer Commanding-in-Chief Eastern Naval Command	PVSM, AVSM, ADC
Major Arun Kumar Pandey	Officer of the 9th Battalion, Parachute Regiment (Special Forces)	Shaurya Chakra
Major Chandra Shekhar Mishra	Officer of the Rajput Regiment, decorated for counter-terrorist operations (posthumous)	Shaurya Chakra

== See also ==
- Sainik School
- Indian Naval Academy
- National Defence Academy (India)
