= Ghorakhal =

Ghorakhal घोड़ाखाल
- town
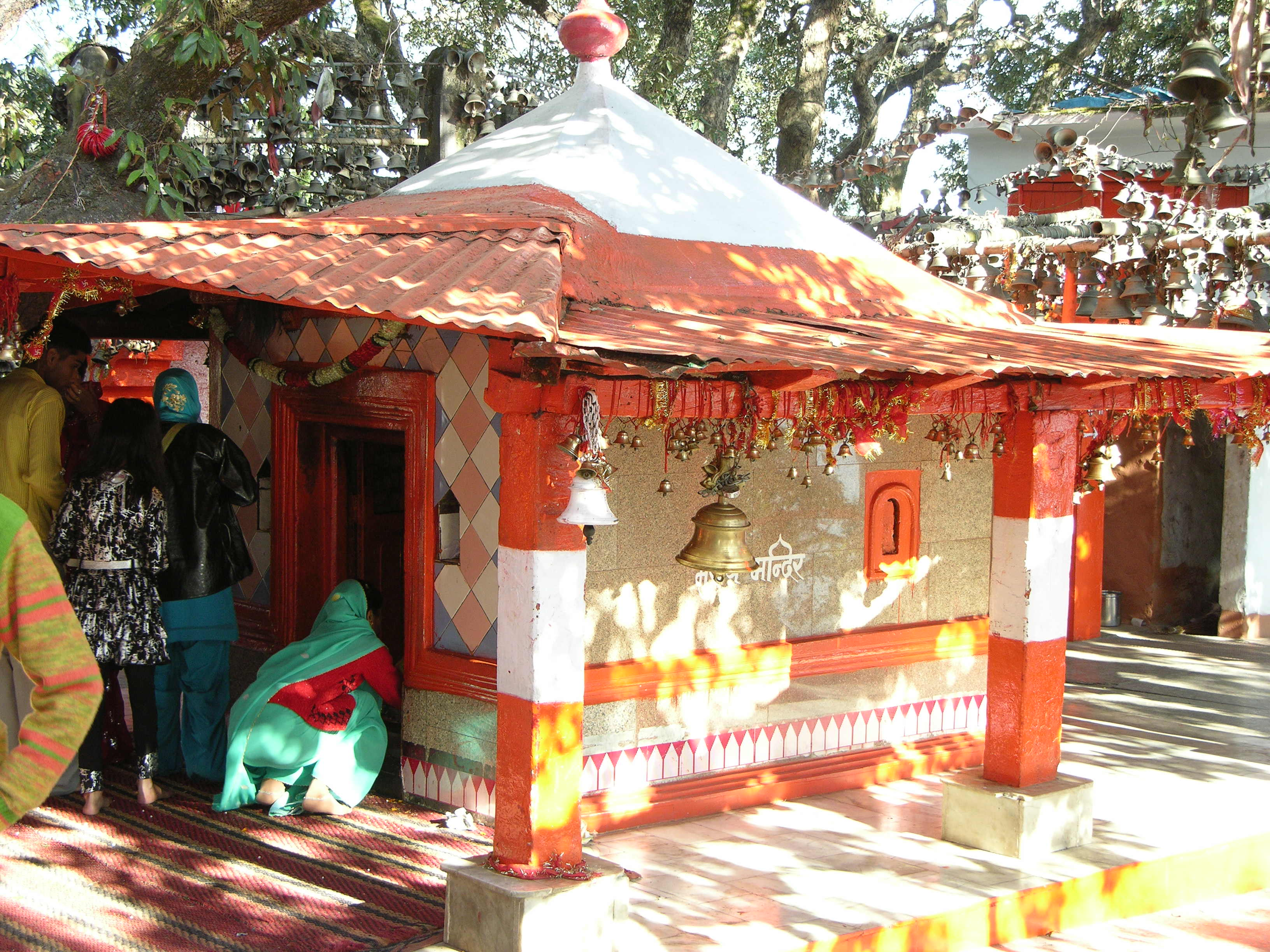
- Golu Devta temple, Ghorakhal

- Location in Uttarakhand, India Ghorakhal (India)
- Coordinates: 29°24′0″N 79°28′7″E
- Country: India
- State: Uttarakhand
- District: Nainital

Languages
  - Official: Hindi
- Time zone: UTC+5:30 (IST)
- Vehicle registration: UK
- Website: uk.gov.in

Ghorakal is the place situated in the Nainital district of the Uttarakhand state of India Ghorakhal means pond for water to horses. It is the picturesque site at the height of more than 2,000 m.

It is situated near Bhowali and is the seat for the boarding school, known as Sainik School Ghorakhal, established in 1966 at the Ghorakhal Estate of the Nawab of Rampur. The aim of Sainik Schools is to prepare boys (and recently some girls) for entry to the National Defence Academy (India). ″The famous Golu Devta temple is situated on a hill above overlooking the school.

Some scenes of Madhumati 1958 classic by Bimal Roy, which was shot extensively around Nainital had some scenes shot at Ghorakhal as well. And scene of the temple in Vivah 2006 movie had the scene from the famous Golu Devta Mandir

== Name Origin ==
Locals say that Ghorakhal is made of two words. 1) Ghora - a kind of a mule and 2) Khal - a land piece which is surrounded by streams of water. So, lots of ghoras used to get a drink at this place and hence the name. This is based on interviews with locals around the temple.

== See also ==
- Hanumangarhi, Nainital
- Kainchi Dham
