= Golu Devata =

Deity of Uttarakhandi people of India

Coordinates: 29.795176°N 79.873076°E

- Golu Devta, Hawalbagh, near Almora

Religion
- Affiliation: Hinduism
- District: Almora
- Deity: Golu Devata

Location
- Location: Binsar wildlife sanctuary
- State: Uttarakhand
- Country: India
- Interactive map of Golu Devata

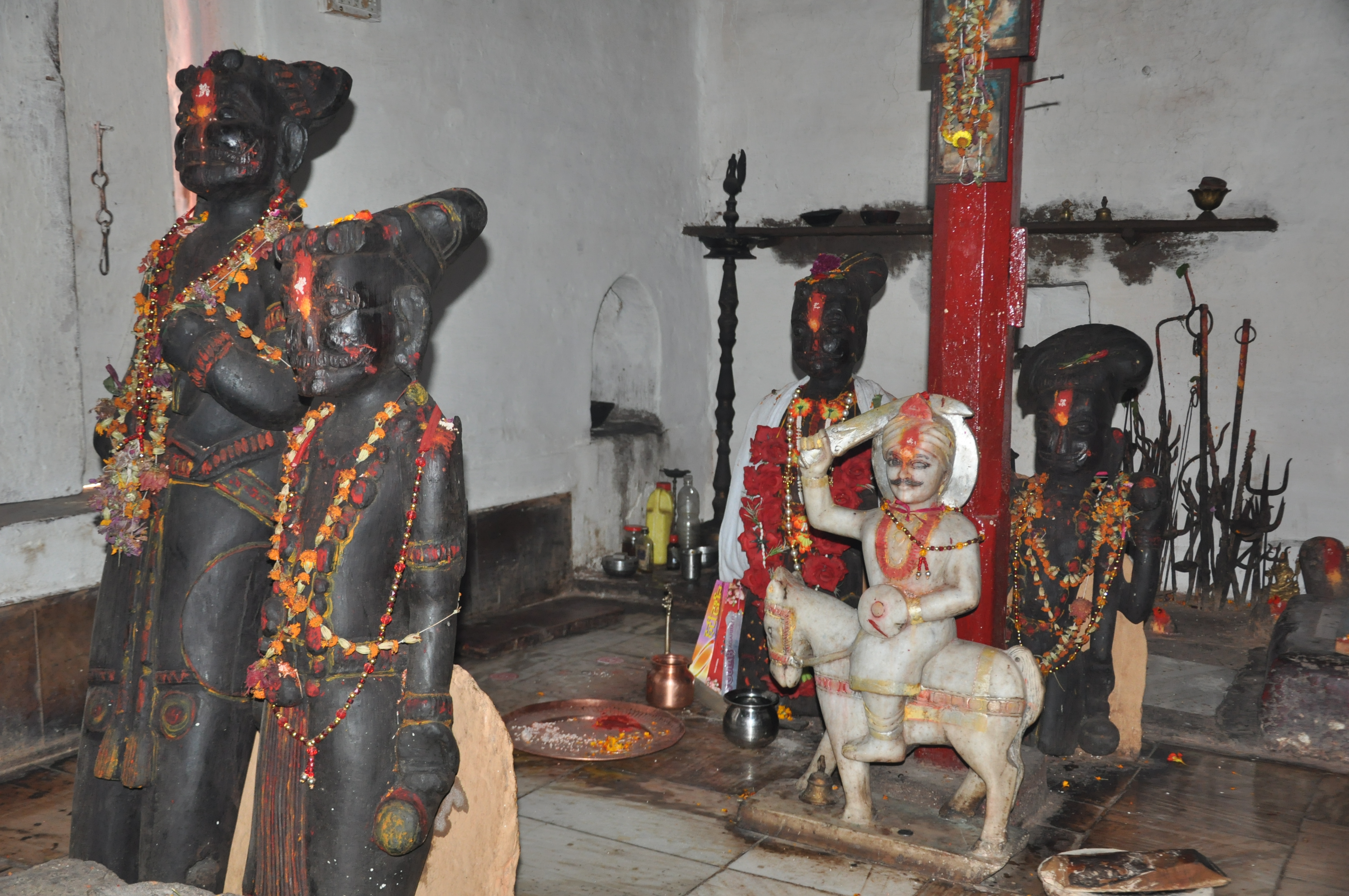
Golu Devata, Udepur,

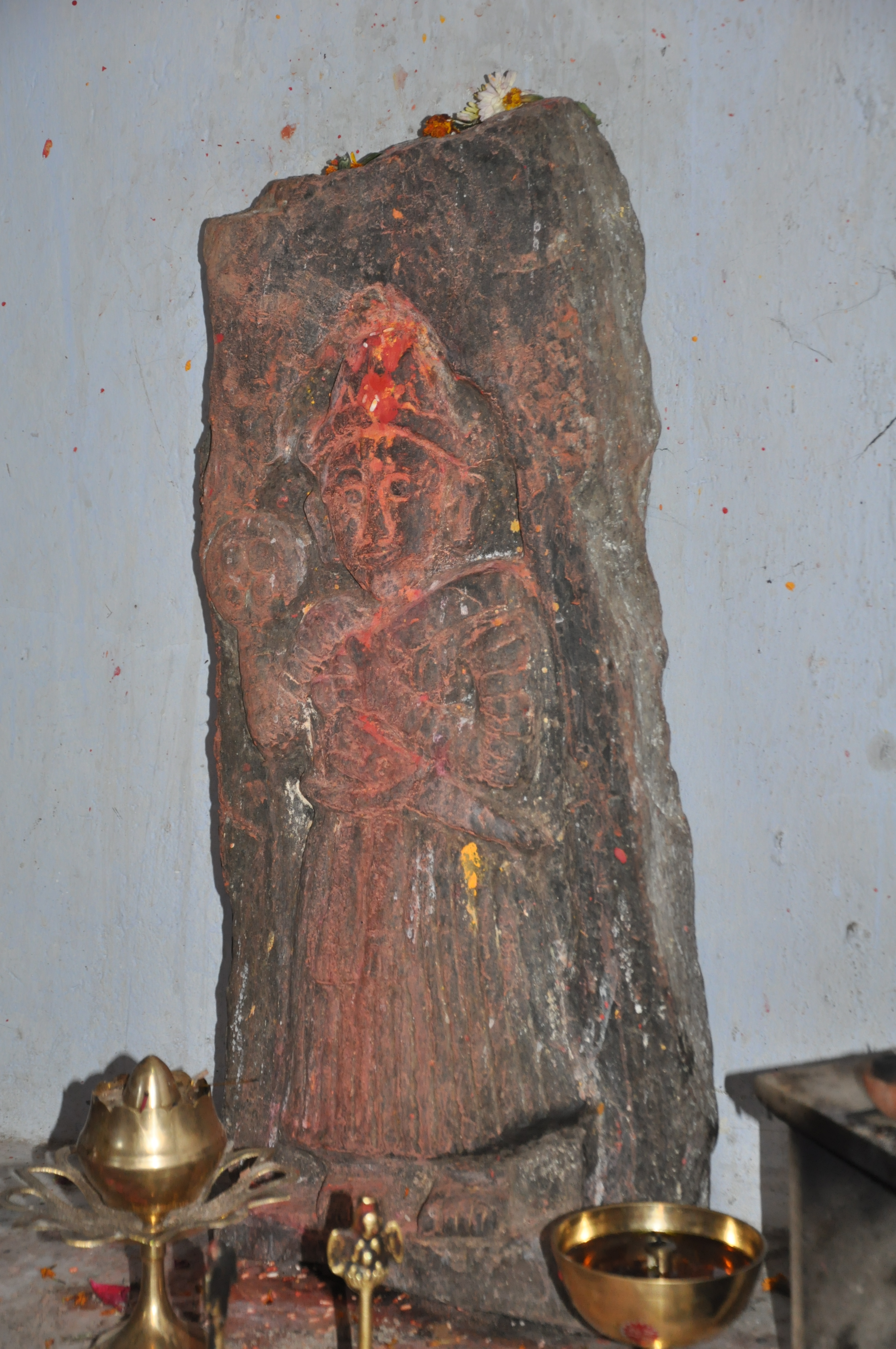
Golu Devata, Chhana, Gagas

Golu Devata (Kumaoni: गोलज्यू) is a deity of the Kumaoni community of India. Also known as the god of justice (Hindi: न्याय के देवता).

The Chitai Golu devta temple is the most notable temple dedicated to the deity and is about 4 km (2.5 mi) from the main gate of Binsar wildlife sanctuary & about 10 km (6.2 mi) from Almora.

The other notable temple is located near Bhowali, next to the Sainik School, Ghorakhal.

Golu Devata used to travel far distances on his horse to meet people of his kingdom, in a practice called Golu Darbar: Golu Devata would hear the problems of the people and help them in any way possible. He had a special place for people in his heart and was always ready to help them. Due to his complete dedication to people, he led a very simple life, following the principles of brahmacharya.

Golu Devata still meets with his people in many villages. The practice of Golu darbar is still prevalent, where Golu Devata appears in front of people, listens to their problems, and helps people in every way possible. In present times, the most common form of Golu Devata Darbar is Jagar.

Golu Devata always had a special place in his heart for his white horse, and it is believed that he still rides his white horse to travel around.

He is worshipped as the god of justice and he serves it well. His mantra is the following: "Jai Nyay Devta Goljyu Tumar Jai ho. Sabuk lije dain haije" (Translation: 'Hail the God of justice: Goljyu! Blessings for everyone').!

== Origin ==
Golu Devata is considered to be an incarnation of Gaur Bhairav, and is worshipped all over the region. He is regarded as the dispenser of justice by the devotees with extreme faith.

Historically, he is considered the brave son of King Jhal Rai and his wife Kalinka, and a general of the Katyuri king. His grandfather was Hal Rai and his great-grandfather was Hal Rai. Historically Champawat is considered the origin of Golu Devata. His mother Kalinka is believed to be the sister of two other local deities: Harishchand Devjyun (the divine spirit of Raja Harish of the Chands) and Sem Devjyun. Both deities are also regarded as Lord Golu's uncles.

Tales about his birth differ from place to place. The most popular story about Golu talks about a local king who, while hunting, sent his servants to look for water. The servants disturbed a woman who was praying. The woman, in a fit of anger, taunted the king that he could not separate two fighting bulls and proceeded to do so herself. The king was very impressed by this deed and he married the lady. When this queen gave birth to a son, the other queens, who were jealous of her, replaced the boy with a silbatta (batan, stone), put him in a cage, and cast him into the river. The child was brought up by a fisherman. When the boy grew up he took a wooden horse to the river and on being questioned by the queens, he replied that if women can give birth to stone, then wooden horses can drink water. When the king heard about this, he punished the guilty queens and crowned the boy, who went on to be known as Golu devta.

Golu Devata is seen in the form of Bhairav. Golu Devata is also prayed to as a key deity (Ista/Kula Devta) in many villages in Kumaon and Garhwal regions of Uttarakhand. Normally three day pooja or 9 day pooja is performed to worship Lord Golu Devata, who is known as Goreel Devta in Chamoli District. Golu Devata is offered ghee, milk, curd, halwa, poori, and pakauri. Golu Devata is offered with White Cloths, white pagari, and white shaal.

There are many temples of Golu Devata in Kumaun, and the most popular are at Chitai, Champawat, Ghorakhal, Chamarkhan (Tehsil Tarikhet, District Almora). It is a popular belief that Golu Devata dispenses quick justice to the devotee. Many devotees file a lot of written petitions daily, which are received by the temple.

Goljyu is the most respected god of Uttarakhand as he is like lord Ganesh of Uttarakhand. In every puja or any religious activity, the goljyu is invited.

== Literature ==
- The History of Kumaun by Jay Uttarakhandi
- Golu Devata The God of Justice of Kumaun Himalayas
- "Kumaon:Kala, Shilp aur Sanskriti"
