= Bhowali =

Town and municipal council in Nainital district, Uttarakhand, India

Bhowali भवाली
- Town and Nagar Palika Parishad
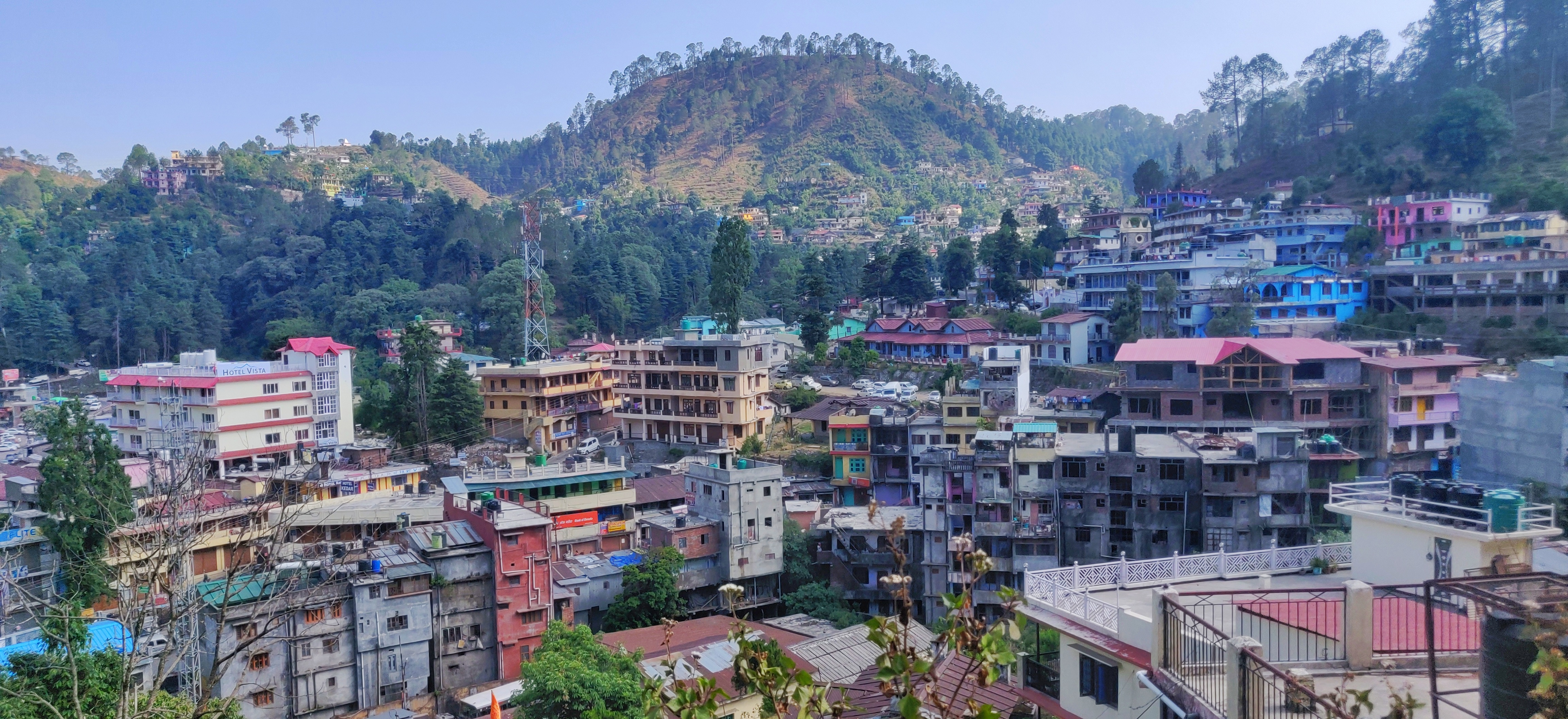
- Panorama of Bhowali along the National Highway 109 transport corridor

- Location in Uttarakhand, India Bhowali (India)
- Coordinates: 29.3800°N 79.5200°E
- Country: India
- State: Uttarakhand
- Division: Kumaon
- District: Nainital
- Tehsil: Nainital
- Community block: Bhimtal
- Municipal status: 1952

Government
  - Type: Nagar Palika Parishad
  - Body: Bhowali Nagar Palika Parishad

Area
  - Total: 4.10 km^{2} (1.58 sq mi)
- Elevation: 1,654 m (5,427 ft)

Population (2011)
  - Total: 6,309
  - Density: 1,540/km^{2} (3,990/sq mi)

Languages
  - Official: Hindi
  - Native / Regional: Kumaoni

Census (2011)
  - Sex ratio: 910 ♀/1000 ♂
  - Child sex ratio: 869 ♀/1000 ♂
  - Literacy rate: 92.90%
- Time zone: UTC+05:30 (IST)
- PIN: 263132
- Area code: +91 5942
- Vehicle registration: UK-04
- State Assembly: Bhimtal (58)
- Lok Sabha: Nainital–Udhamsingh Nagar
- Website: nainital.nic.in

Bhowali ([bʱəˈʋaːli]; Devanagari: भवाली, Kumaoni: [bʱoːˈaːli]) is a municipal town and major commercial road junction situated in the Nainital district of the northern Indian state of Uttarakhand. Administratively, the town is governed under the Nainital tehsil. Positioned in the Outer Lesser Himalayas at an average altitude of 1,706 metres (5,597 feet) above mean sea level, the town is located 11 kilometres east of Nainital, 11 kilometres northwest of Bhimtal, and 35 kilometres north of the railway terminus at Kathgodam.

Historically developed as a health resort and mountain sanatorium station, Bhowali is the site of the King Edward VII Sanatorium, established in 1912 across 18 hectares of pine forest for the specialized open-air treatment of tuberculosis. The town serves as the primary horticultural wholesale marketplace (fruit mandi) for the central Kumaon division, handling regional commerce in apples, peaches, plums, apricots, and strawberries. In addition, Bhowali accommodates the Uttarakhand Judicial and Legal Academy (UJALA), the state judicial training institute founded in 2004.

== Toponymy ==
The name Bhowali (traditionally rendered in Kumaoni as Bhoali) is derived from the regional geographical term denoting a mountain pass and natural saddle depression positioned between the Gaula and Kosi watersheds. In nineteenth-century administrative surveys and regional gazetteers, the settlement was recorded as an important clearing and camping ground along the bridle highways linking the lowlands of Rohilkhand with the hill capitals of Almora and Ranikhet.

== History ==
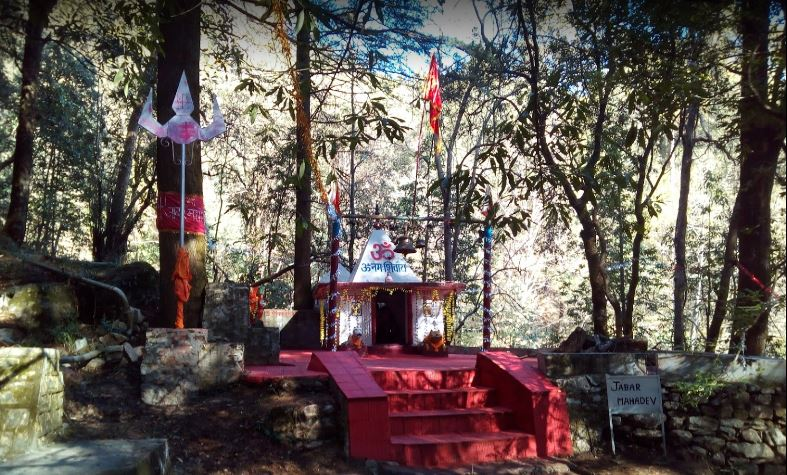
Forested ridgeline and pine slopes surrounding the historic Bhowali Sanatorium area

=== Early trade route and colonial development ===
During the successive administrations of the Katyuri kings and the Chand kings of Kumaon, the Bhowali saddle functioned as an upland transit gateway connecting the agricultural lowlands of the Bhabar with the inner Himalayan trade corridors. Following the Anglo-Nepalese War and the signing of the Treaty of Sugauli in 1815, the region came under British colonial governance. The site subsequently developed into a primary transport junction where mountain roads branched westward to Nainital, northward to Ranikhet and Almora, and eastward to the Kumaon lake basin.

=== King Edward VII Sanatorium ===
In the early twentieth century, British medical authorities identified the microclimate of Bhowali as exceptionally favorable for respiratory convalescence due to its sunny southern exposure, moderate humidity, and extensive stands of resinous Chir pine (Pinus roxburghii). In 1912, the King Edward VII Sanatorium was founded as one of the earliest specialized open-air tuberculosis treatment centres in northern India. Major General Sir Syed Mohammed Hamid Ali Khan Bahadur, the Nawab of Rampur, donated 18 hectares of estate land for the medical complex following the death of his wife from untreated pulmonary tuberculosis.

During the twentieth century, the sanatorium became a prominent medical retreat for public figures and families across India seeking long-term respiratory recuperation. Kamala Nehru, the wife of Jawaharlal Nehru, was admitted to the sanatorium in 1935 for prolonged tuberculosis therapy, with Jawaharlal Nehru visiting her regularly while incarcerated at the Almora and Bareilly district prisons before her departure for Europe. Other notable historical patients who underwent treatment or convalesced at the institution include nationalist leader Subhas Chandra Bose, Hindi revolutionary novelist Yashpal, classical singer and actor Kundan Lal Saigal, jurist Kailash Nath Katju, and poet Gaya Prasad Shukla 'Sanehi'. The sanatorium also treated patients from princely and urban centres across India, including Siddiqa Bano Khan, mother of screenwriter Salim Khan, who spent seasonal four-month treatment periods in the facility's quarantined cottages during the 1940s.

=== Post-independence and civic evolution ===
Following Indian independence in 1947, Bhowali grew into a municipal trading centre and administrative subdivision. The town was constituted as a Notified Area in the 1950s and subsequently elevated to a Class-III Nagar Palika Parishad (Municipal Council). In 2004, the Government of Uttarakhand established the state judicial academy at Bhowali to conduct judicial officer training.

== Geography and climate ==
Bhowali is situated at coordinates 29.38 degrees North latitude and 79.52 degrees East longitude, spanning an intermontane saddle ridge at an average elevation of 1,654 metres (5,426 feet). The town overlooks the headwater valleys of the Gaula and Kosi river catchments and is surrounded by five freshwater lakes in the Kumaon lake district: Bhimtal Lake (11 km southeast), Sattal (12 km southeast), Naukuchiatal (15 km southeast), Nal Damyanti Tal (9 km southeast), and Nainital Lake (11 km west).

Geologically, Bhowali lies within the Paleoproterozoic Bhowali Volcanics formation (also designated the Bhimtal Volcanics), characterized by spilitic basalts, basic amygdaloidal lava flows, chlorite tuffs, and quartzites of the Jaunsar Group.

The town experiences a temperate subtropical highland climate (Cwb in the Köppen climate classification), moderated by altitude and surrounding pine woodlands. Summers (April to June) are mild with average maximums between 22 and 26 degrees Celsius. The southwest monsoon (late June through late September) brings heavy rainfall averaging 1,600 millimetres annually. Winters (December to February) are cold with daily minimum temperatures between 1 and 4 degrees Celsius, regular frost, and occasional light snowfall on higher ridges.

Climate data for Bhowali (1991-2020 normals)
Month	Jan	Feb	Mar	Apr	May	Jun	Jul	Aug	Sep	Oct	Nov	Dec	Year
Mean daily maximum °C (°F)	11.8 (53.2)	13.5 (56.3)	18.1 (64.6)	22.8 (73.0)	25.6 (78.1)	24.9 (76.8)	22.1 (71.8)	21.6 (70.9)	21.4 (70.5)	20.2 (68.4)	17.5 (63.5)	14.1 (57.4)	19.5 (67.0)
Mean daily minimum °C (°F)	1.8 (35.2)	2.9 (37.2)	6.8 (44.2)	11.2 (52.2)	14.1 (57.4)	15.3 (59.5)	15.4 (59.7)	15.1 (59.2)	14.0 (57.2)	10.4 (50.7)	6.8 (44.2)	3.6 (38.5)	9.8 (49.6)
Average precipitation mm (inches)	52.4 (2.06)	58.1 (2.29)	44.6 (1.76)	32.8 (1.29)	78.4 (3.09)	252.1 (9.93)	548.6 (21.60)	482.2 (18.98)	238.5 (9.39)	46.8 (1.84)	9.2 (0.36)	21.5 (0.85)	1,865.2 (73.44)
Source: India Meteorological Department

== Demographics ==
According to the 2011 Census of India (Town Code 800331), Bhowali had an urban population of 6,309 residents living in 1,472 households. Males constituted 3,304 (52.37 percent) and females 3,005 (47.63 percent), yielding a sex ratio of 910 females per 1,000 males, up from 846 recorded in the 2001 census. Children aged 0 to 6 numbered 658 (10.43 percent of the total population), with a child sex ratio of 869 girls per 1,000 boys. The population grew by 14.46 percent between 2001 (5,512 residents) and 2011.

Demographic Profile of Bhowali (Census 2001 vs 2011)
Demographic Indicator	Census 2001	Census 2011	Decadal Change
Population Structure and Gender
Total population	5,512	6,309	+14.46%
Male population	2,986	3,304	+10.65%
Female population	2,526	3,005	+18.96%
Sex ratio (females per 1000 males)	846	910	+64 ♀
Child population (0 to 6 years)	606	658	+8.58%
Child sex ratio (girls per 1000 boys)	853	869	+16 ♀
Social Composition and Education
Scheduled Castes (SC)	1,025 (18.60%)	1,328 (21.05%)	+29.56%
Scheduled Tribes (ST)	41 (0.74%)	57 (0.90%)	+39.02%
Total literates	4,410	5,250	+19.05%
Effective literacy rate	89.89%	92.90%	+3.01%
Male literacy rate	93.65%	96.08%	+2.43%
Female literacy rate	85.44%	89.41%	+3.97%
Religious Affiliation Breakdown (Census 2011)
Hinduism	5,357		84.91%
Islam	829		13.14%
Christianity	102		1.62%
Sikhism	10		0.16%
Buddhism	5		0.08%
Other or unstated	6		0.09%

The Scheduled Caste population represents 21.05 percent (1,328 individuals), and Scheduled Tribes constitute 0.90 percent (57 individuals). The effective literacy rate stands at 92.90 percent (5,250 literate individuals aged seven and above), with male literacy at 96.08 percent and female literacy at 89.41 percent, significantly exceeding the national benchmark of 74.04 percent.

Kumaoni is the indigenous language spoken across domestic and cultural spheres, while Hindi serves as the state official language, commercial medium, and primary language of education.

== Civic administration and politics ==
Bhowali is administered by a Nagar Palika Parishad (Municipal Council) under the provisions of the Uttarakhand Municipalities Act. The municipality is divided into wards represented by elected ward councillors, headed by an executive President elected directly by the municipal electorate. The town serves as the administrative seat of Bhowali Tehsil.

In the Uttarakhand Legislative Assembly, Bhowali is represented within the Bhimtal Assembly constituency (Constituency No. 58). In parliamentary elections, the town forms part of the Nainital–Udhamsingh Nagar Lok Sabha constituency.

== Economy and traditional commerce ==
Bhowali is recognized as the central fruit mandi (wholesale horticultural marketplace) of the Kumaon hills. The temperate microclimate of the surrounding Ramgarh, Mukteshwar, and Ghorakhal valleys supports commercial cultivation of stone and pome fruits, including peaches, plums, apricots, apples, pears, and strawberries. The municipal mandi operates as the primary aggregation and dispatch hub supplying fruit harvests to wholesale markets in Haldwani, New Delhi, and Lucknow.

The municipal bazaar of Bhowali developed post-independence as a commercial centre serving surrounding agricultural valleys and transit travelers. Traditional goldsmithing and regional ornaments form an established part of the town retail heritage, exemplified by early local establishments such as Prince and Sanjay Jewellers (established in 1956), which specialized in traditional Kumaoni handcrafted bridal jewellery, including the Nath (gold filigree nose ring), Guloband (choker necklace), and Pauchi (embossed gold bead wristlet).

In addition to horticulture and bazaar trade, the town economy is sustained by tourism transit services, road transport logistics, hotel hospitality, roadside fruit retail stalls along National Highway 109, and public administration employment.

== Education and institutions ==
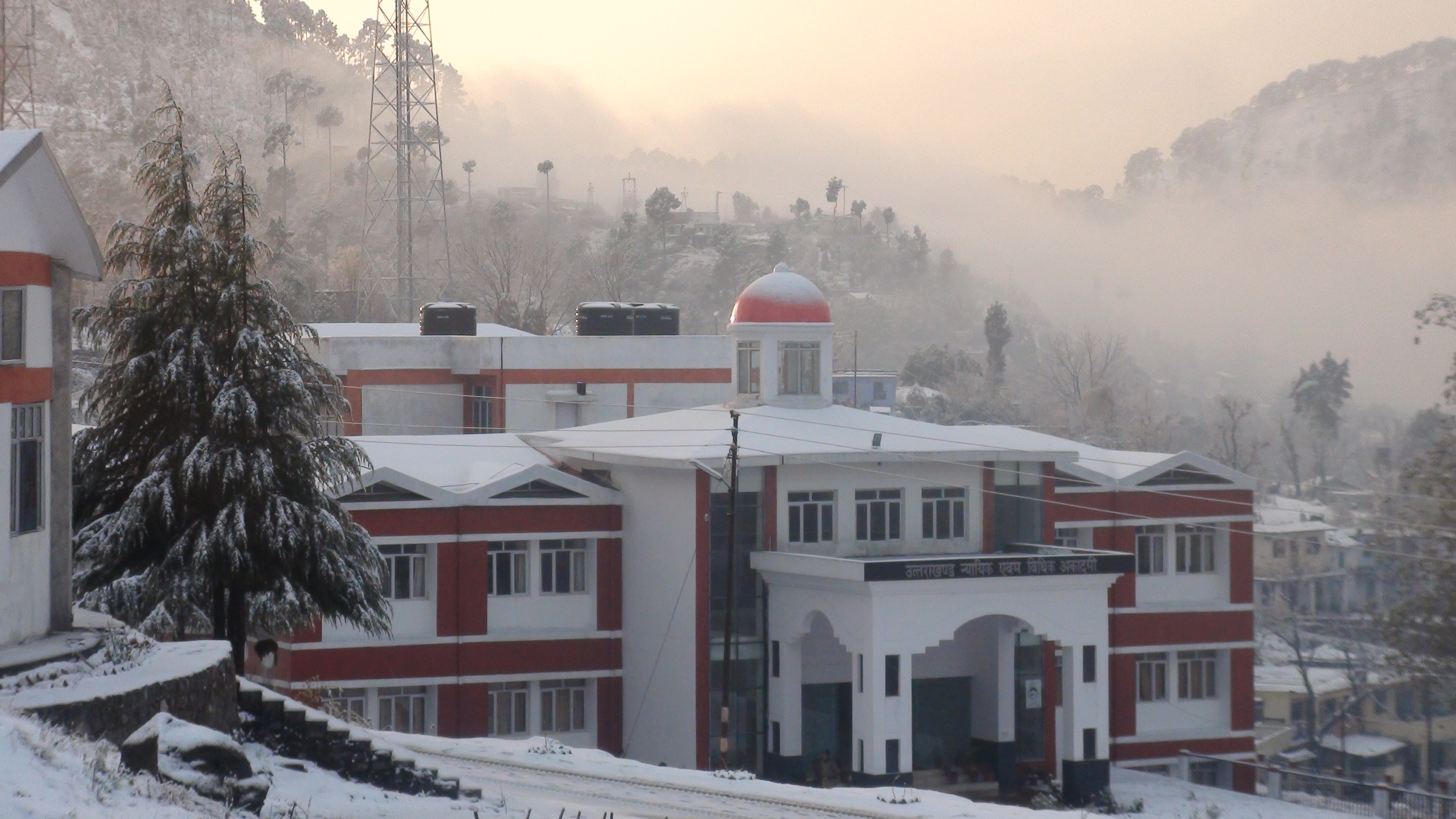
Uttarakhand Judicial and Legal Academy (UJALA) campus in Bhowali during winter snowfall

Uttarakhand Judicial and Legal Academy (UJALA)
Situated in Bhowali, UJALA was established on 19 December 2004 to provide induction, continuous judicial education, and legal research training to judicial officers, prosecutors, and registry personnel of Uttarakhand. The foundation stone was laid by Justice R. C. Lahoti, then Chief Justice of India, in the presence of Chief Minister N. D. Tiwari and Uttarakhand High Court Chief Justice V. S. Sirpurkar.

Schools
Primary and secondary education is provided through Government Inter College (GIC) Bhowali, Government Girls Inter College (GGIC) Bhowali, Model Basic School, St. Joseph's Convent, and private secondary institutions affiliated with the CBSE and the Uttarakhand Board of School Education.

== Culture and places of interest ==
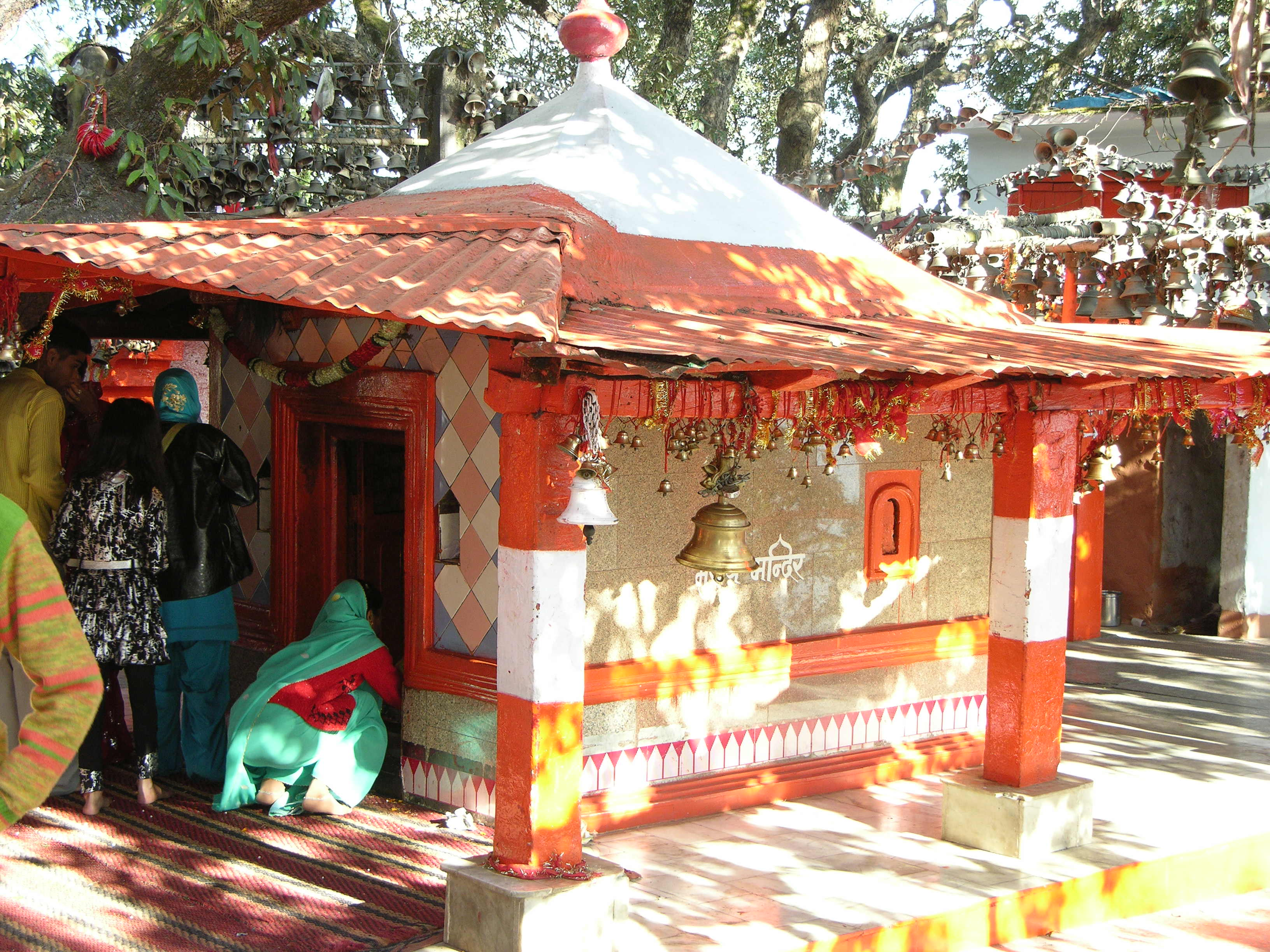
Golu Devta temple at Ghorakhal, located 3 km north of Bhowali

Golu Devta Temple, Ghorakhal
Situated 3 kilometres north of Bhowali at Ghorakhal, this shrine is dedicated to Golu Devta, the revered deity of justice in Kumaoni folk tradition, renowned for thousands of brass bells and written petitions suspended across its courtyard by devotees seeking justice.

Kainchi Dham
Located 8 kilometres northwest of Bhowali on the Almora highway, this renowned ashram and temple complex was established in the 1960s by the mystic saint Neem Karoli Baba, attracting thousands of national and international pilgrims annually.

Jabar Mahadev Temple
An ancient hilltop Shiva shrine situated on the forested ridgeline near the Sanatorium area, frequented during the festival of Maha Shivaratri.

Shyamkhet Organic Tea Garden
Located adjacent to Ghorakhal on leased terraced slopes, producing orthodox green and black teas under the aegis of the Uttarakhand Tea Development Board.

== Transport ==
Bhowali is a primary road transport junction in Kumaon, situated at the intersection of National Highway 109 (connecting Rudrapur, Haldwani, Bhowali, Almora, and Karnaprayag) and state highways branching toward Nainital, Bhimtal, and Mukteshwar. The Uttarakhand Transport Corporation (UTC) and private Kumaon Motor Owners Union (KMOU) operate regular bus and shared taxi services connecting Bhowali with Haldwani, Nainital, Almora, Ranikhet, Pithoragarh, Dehradun, and New Delhi.

The nearest railway terminus is Kathgodam railway station (Station Code: KGM), situated 35 kilometres south, providing broad-gauge rail connectivity to New Delhi, Lucknow, Dehradun, and Kolkata.

The nearest domestic airport is Pantnagar Airport (IATA: PGH), located 65 kilometres south in the Terai plains, offering commercial flights to New Delhi and Dehradun.

== See also ==
- Bhimtal
- Kainchi Dham
- Mukteshwar
- Nainital district
- Kumaon division
