= Nainital Lake =

Lake in Uttarakhand, India

- Nainital
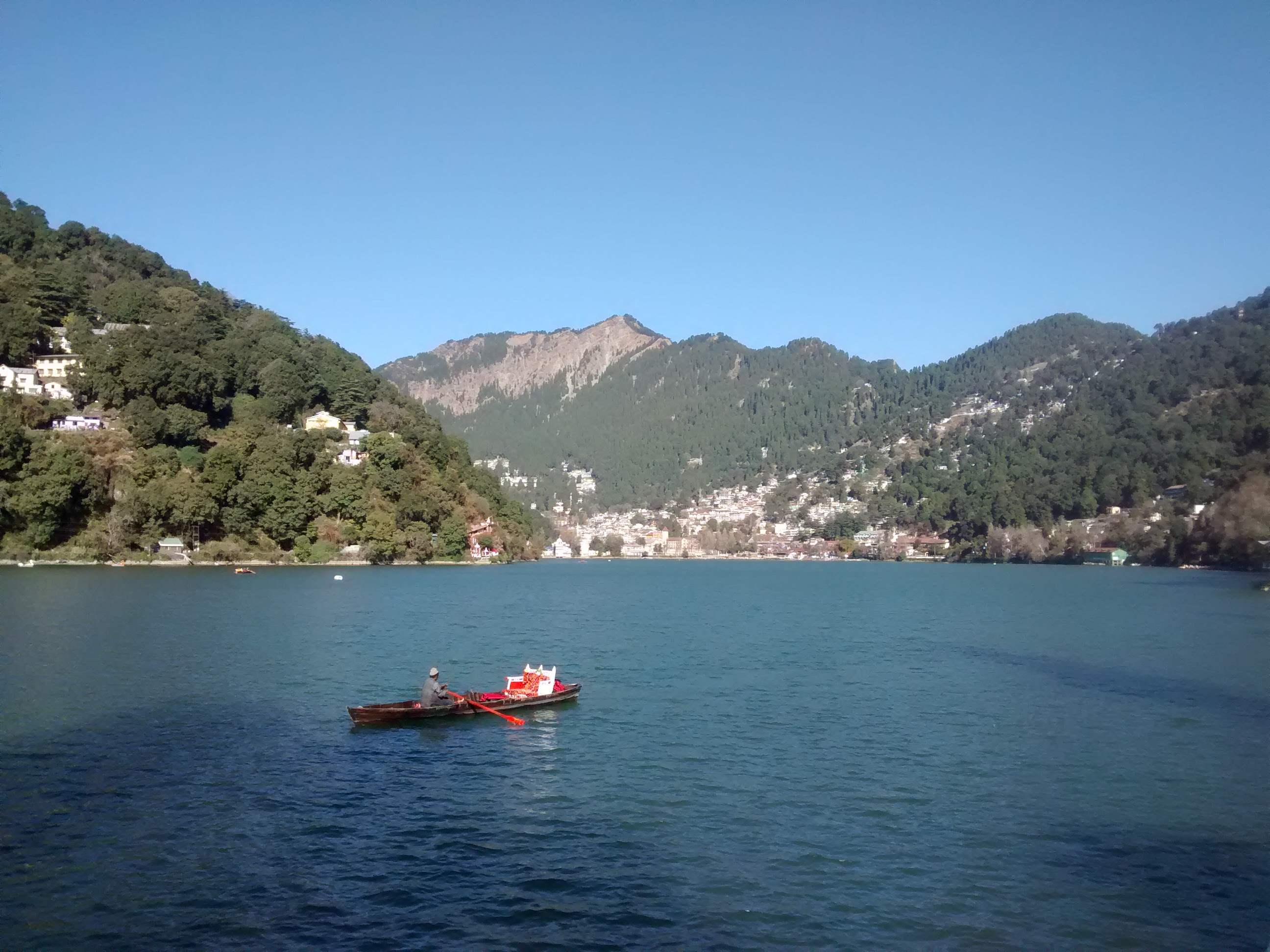
- Scenic view of Nainital from Tallital

- Location in Uttarakhand Nainital Lake (India)
- Interactive map of Nainital Lake
- Location: Nainital Town, Kumaon, India
- Coordinates: 29°23′15″N 79°27′27″E
- Type: Natural Freshwater Body
- Basin countries: India
- Max. length: 1,432 m (4,698 ft)
- Max. width: 457 m (1,499 ft)
- Surface area: 48.76 ha (120.5 acres)
- Max. depth: 30.3 m (99 ft)
- Water volume: 8,495,053 m^{3} (300,000,000 cu ft)
- Surface elevation: 1,938 m (6,358 ft)
- Settlements: Nainital Town

Naini Tal, also known as Naini Lake, is a natural freshwater body, situated amidst the town of Nainital in Kumaon, Uttarakhand, India. It is tectonic in origin and was almost circular, until frequent landslides made it crescent shaped and has an outfall at the southeastern end. Nainital, along with other lakes of Kumaon, is integral to tourism and recreation in Kumaon. The lake is also an integral part of Kumaoni folklore.

Nainital Lake in Nainital Town of the Nainital district, often called the Lake District of India, is one of the four important lakes of Kumaon; the other three are Sattal Lake, Bhimtal Lake and Naukuchiyatal Lake. It's the 3rd biggest lake by surface area in Uttarakhand.

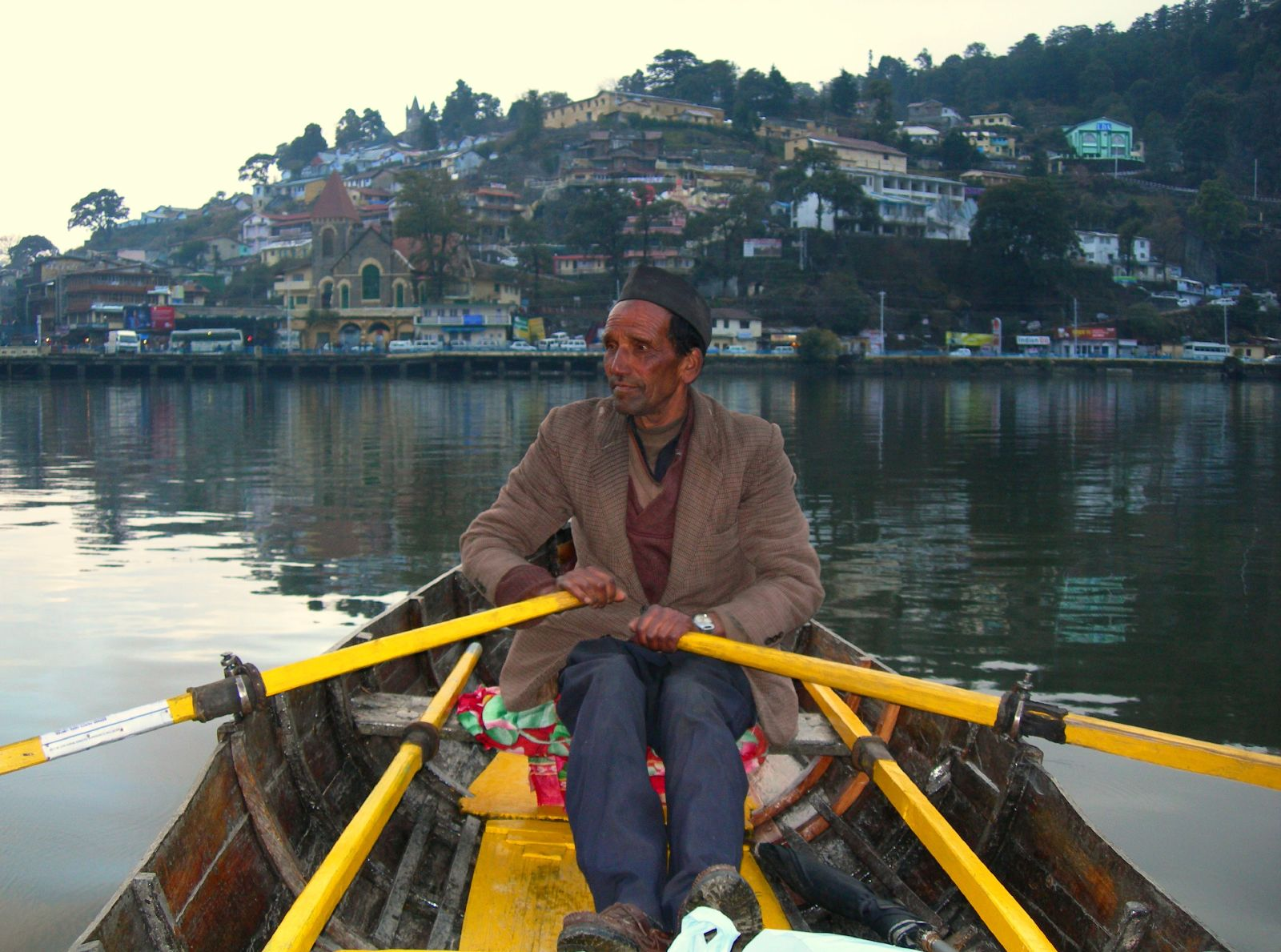
A Kumaoni man on the Lake in Nainital

== History ==
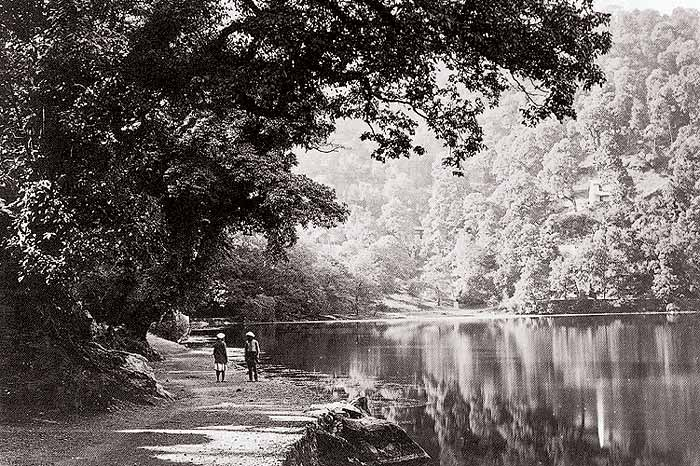
A view of the south end of the lake, 1866

The first European to visit Naini Tal was P. Barron, an English sugar trader. Barron accidentally came across the lake after getting lost on a hunting expedition and was so captivated that he decided to leave the sugar business and build a European colony on shores of the lake. The news magazine, the Englishman Calcutta, reported in 1841 discovery of this lake near Almora.

== Topography and Hydrology ==
The lake is bounded by the high and steep Naina peak on the North West side, by the Tiffin Top to the south west side and snow view peaks on the north. Coniferous forest trees cover these hill ranges. The annual rainfall in the basin area of the lake is reported to be 1,294.5 mm (50.96 in). Tropical monsoon climate with maximum temperature 24.6 °C and minimum of 0.5 °C are recorded. The water is reported to be alkaline in nature (ph value of 8.4–9.3).

The lake receives flows from the surrounding catchment basin which comprises the hill slopes and springs. The hydrologic studies related to water balance and sedimentation was done using radioisotopes for estimating/measuring the various components of the inflow and outflow into the lake. Studies indicated that the subsurface inflow and outflow were significant – ranging from 43 to 63% and 41 to 54%, respectively, of the total inflow and outflow, except in years of exceptionally heavy rainfall. The components of outflows were the surface outflow, the subsurface outflow through the springs on the downstream side and draft through wells for meeting the water supply of Nainital town and evaporation loss from the lake surface. The mean water retention time for the lake was computed as 1.16 years for the mean annual rainfall.

== Geology ==
The Krol group of rocks, comprising slates, marls, sandstones, limestones and dolomites with a few small dykes intrusives, is the dominant geological formation of the lake's surroundings. The lake is deduced to have been formed tectonically. Balia Nala, which is the main stream feeding the lake is along a fault line and the subsequent streams align parallel to major joints and faults. 26 major drains feed the lake including the 3 perennial drains. The lake catchment has highly folded and faulted rocks due to poly phase deformation. Landslides are a frequent occurrence in the hill slopes surrounding the lake, which are steep. The slopes are highly vulnerable to landslides and mass movement due to various geological and human factors. Several landslides have occurred in the past (pictured) around the lake. Many settlements around the lake are located in landslide areas.

== Flora and fauna ==
While the Nainital district where the lake is situated (in the middle Himalayan ranges up to 2,000 m (6,600 ft), a temperate zone), is rich in flora (typical temperate climate plants) and fauna, the details of the flora and fauna specific to the lake and its surroundings recorded are the following.

=== Vegetation ===
The trees and bushes grown in the region (lake's basin) with their botanical and common Indian names (in parentheses) are reported to be: a) Quercus leucotrichophora Oak (Banj); b) Aesculus indica (Pangar or Horse chestnuts); c) Juglans regia (Akhrot or walnut), d) Populus ciliata (Hill Pipal, a sacred tree); e) Fraxinus micrantha (Ash tree or Angu); f) Platanus orientalis (Chinar); g) Rubus lasiocarpus (Hisalu); h) Rosa moschata (Kunj or Musk rose); i) Berberis asiatica (Kilmora);j) Cupressus torulosa (Surai or Himalayan cypress); k) Rhododendron arboreum (Buruns); Cedrus deodara (Deodar); l) Salix acmophylla (Weeping Willow); and m) Pinus (Pine).

The Aquatic Macrophytic vegetation recorded are the a) Potamogeton pectinatus, 2) Potamogeton crispus, 3) Polygonum glabrum, 4) Polygonum amphibium and Polygonum hydropiper (Water pepper).

Several species of medicinal flora and horticulture plants have also been reported.

=== Aqua fauna ===
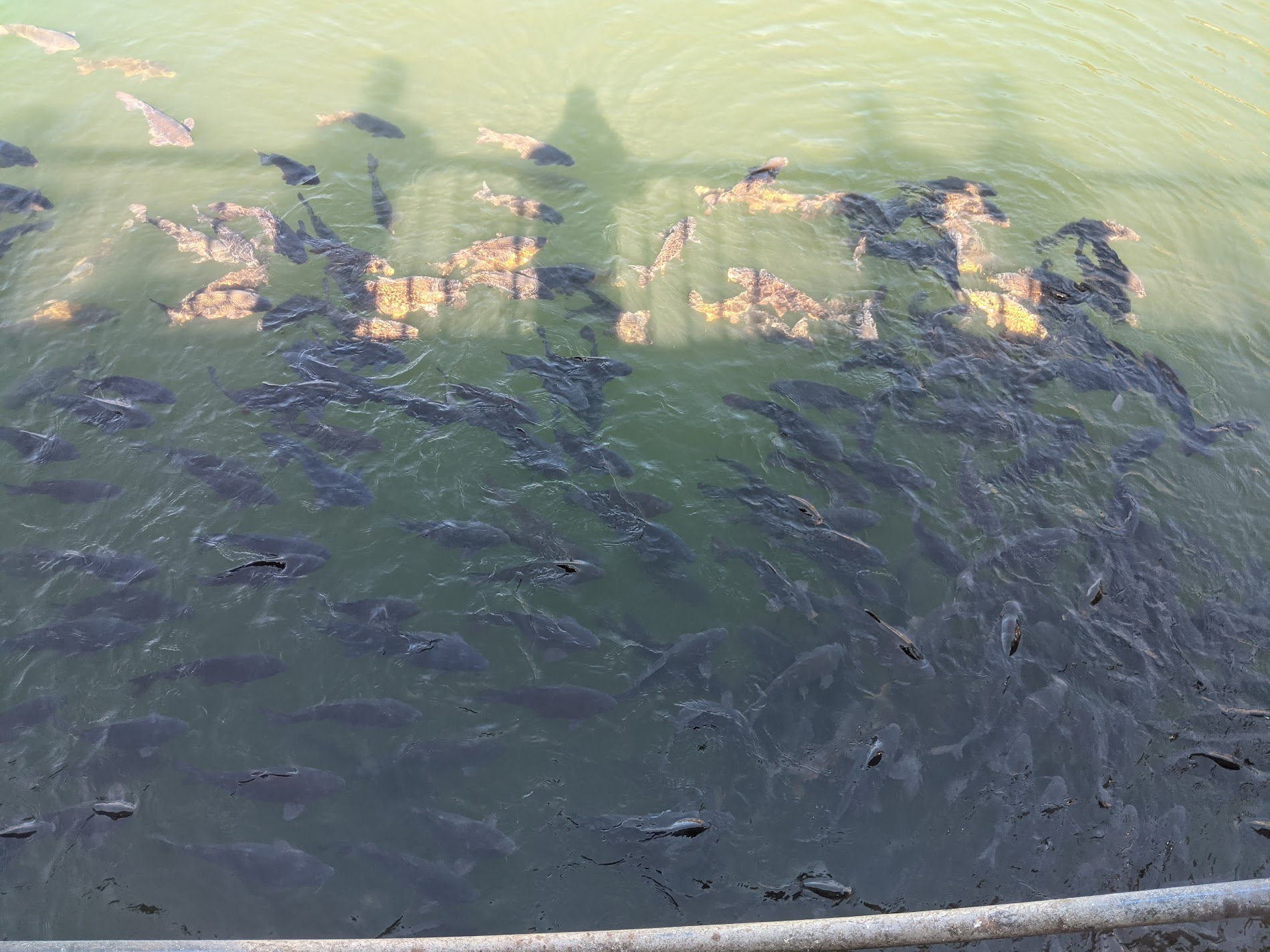
Hill trout found abundant in Nainital Lake

The fishes found in the lake are generally carps: species of mahseer, (Note: The Kumaoni term mahāsir, mahāser, or mahāsaulā is used for a number of fishes of the group.) hill trout, and the mirror carp which breed several times during one spawning season during May to September. Two species of mahaseer fish are present: Tor tor, the red-finned mahseer, and Tor putitora the yellow-finned mahseer, a food fish which grows to varying sizes from 20 to 60 cm (8 to 23.5 in) are reported. The three species of hill trout found in the lake are Schizothorax sinuatus, S. richardsoni and S. plagiostornus. The imported fish bred in the lake is mirror carp, a variety of the common carp Cyprinus carpio. The mosquitofish Gambusia affinis has been introduced in the lake for the biocontrol of mosquito larvae.

=== Fauna ===
Seven hundred species of birds and have been recorded in the Nainital district.

== Water quality ==
A scientific study indicates that the open drains feeding the lake introduce toxic substances from the catchment of the lake, particularly heavy metals which get adsorbed onto the suspended sediments, which in turn settle down in the bottom of the lake. A study of the risk assessment code has revealed that 4–13% of manganese, 4–8% of copper, 17–24% of nickel, 3–5% of chromium, 13–26% of lead, 14–23% of cadmium and 2–3% of zinc exist in exchangeable fraction which puts the lake under the low to medium risk category and infers that it could enter into food chain and also cause deleterious effects to aquatic life. This study provides the basic database to formulate guidelines for the dredging operations and/or restoration programmes in the lake.

The water quality studies carried out by the National Institute of Hydrology during 1999–2001 on physico-chemical parameters (pH, temperature profile, Secchi's transparency, dissolved oxygen, BOD, COD and nutrients), biological profile (density of population, biomass and species diversity of phyto, zooplankton and macrobenthos) and bacteriological characteristics have led to the conclusion that long-term limnological changes have occurred in the lake. Excess of nutrients inflow have contributed to the eutrophic conditions and the internal recycling of nutrients from sediments during water circulation has resulted in luxurious growth of phytoplankton. The lake is thus anoxic and has reduced hypolimnion, winter circulation, large phytoplankton and relatively lower animal population.

== Threats to the lake ==
The problems facing the lake which were also listed in the plea in a Public Interest Litigation (PIL) before the Supreme Court of India in 1995 seeking court directive for redress measures could be summarised as below:

- The lake is eutrophic to high nutrient accumulation and growth of phytoplankton. Algal blooms had caused loss of transparency. In spite of installing sewer lines to prevent sewage entering the lake still some effluents from drains, leakage and open defecation add to the eutrophication.
- High Siltation resulting in reduction of lake depth (the depth of lake is reported to have reduced from its original depth of 27.97 m to only 19.6m.),
- Clogging of water channels (drains) in the surrounding hills because of encroachment, leading to poor drainage.
- Landslides from the unstable hill slopes draining into the lake
- Inadequate sanitation facilities for the poor section of society, commuters and tourists.

== Lake restoration ==
The National Institute of Hydrology (NIH) of Roorkee who prepared a plan for the restoration of the lake, at an estimated cost of Rs 50 crore (about US$10 million), sponsored by the Ministry of Environment and Forests, Government of India, are also now guiding the restoration measures. The Conservation and Management Plan evolved by NIH is not only lake centric but also proposes to tackle the immediate periphery of the lake which contributes an adverse impact on the lake. The "Nainital Jheel Parikshetra Vishesh Kshetra Vikas Pradhikaran", the Lake Development Authority notified under U.P. Special Area Development Act 1986 is a Special Purpose Vehicle (SPV) set up for implementing the restoration works. The restoration works that have been implemented or are in different stages of implementation are the following:

- Limnological measures such as bottom aeration, siphoning of hypolimnetic water, biomanipulation and limited sediment removal from the deltas of drains which lead to the lake.
- Soil Conservation & Slope Stabilization measures in the form of soil conservation and watershed management activities in the catchment area of the lake, slope stabilization, Drainage line treatment, landslide scars to be treated with Coir geotextiles with gabion cross-barriers and proper maintenance and cleaning of drainage system
- Provide 100% coverage of the town surrounding the lake with sewers and Sewage Treatment Plants (STPs)
- Improved sanitation around the lake and in the catchment with new community toilets to cover all sections of the society, improved design of household toilets
- Better solid waste management by disposing of the solid waste through a chute to the downhill outside the catchment, developing landfill sites is developed and in isolated habitations in the upper reaches of hills, introduce composting measures with support from NGOs.
- Limited dredging of the lake, particularly near the deltas of drains that bring sediments
- Fish Gambusia affinis introduced a few years ago to control mosquito larvae, the fish have started feeding on the larger zooplankton resulting due to scanty larvae population resulting in adverse impact on the lake water quality. This needs to be controlled by putting minnow traps in the lake and introducing some other fish species
- The outflow from the lake is into the Balia Nala drain controlled by a set of sluices located at the lake bridge. The sluices which are old need renovation and replacement. The Balia Nala also needs slope stabilization measures to check landslides

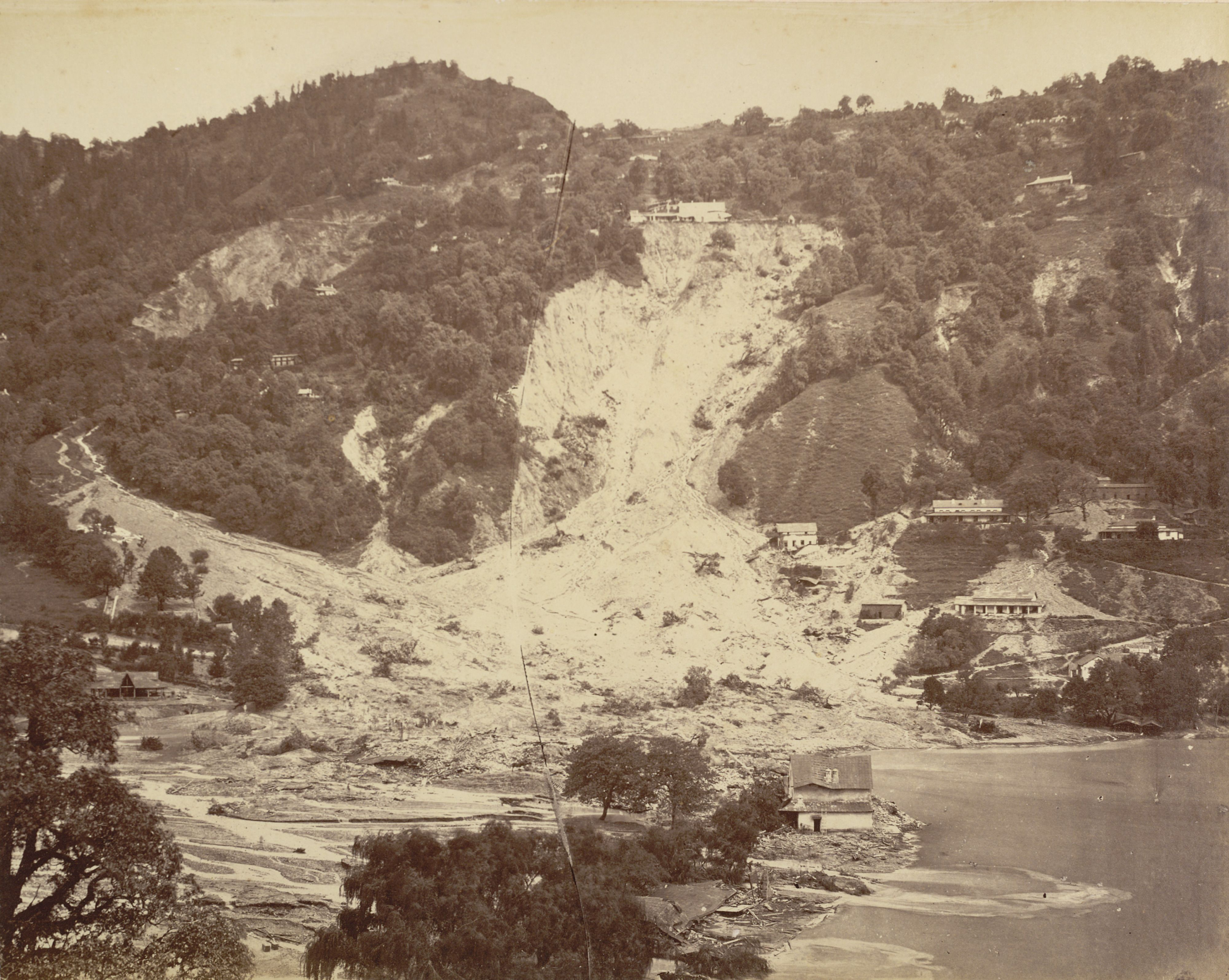
Landslide in 1880

- Shoreline Development and improvement of facilities at all important monuments and temples located in the periphery of the lake and providing avenue paths and roads
- Improved Public Awareness and Public Participation programmes
- The "Nainital Jheel Parikshetra Vishesh Kshetra Vikas Pradhikaran" could function better in a limited role as a promoter and a facilitator for developmental and commercial activities with jurisdiction extended to cover all four lakes in the district, as at present a plethora of organizations are functioning in the notified area such as Nainital Nagar Palika Parishad, Jal Nigam, Irrigation Department, Power Corporation, Forest Department and Fisheries Department who are directly involved with the lake.

The Honourable Supreme Court of India in its judgment of 1995, in response to the Public Interest Litigation, gave the following recommendations which have also been addressed in the restoration measures mentioned above.

(i)Sewage water has to be prevented at any cost from entering the lake; (ii) So far as the drains which ultimately fall in the lake are concerned, it has to be seen that building materials are not allowed to be heaped on the drains to prevent siltation of the lake;(iii) Care has been taken to see that horse dung does not reach the lake. If for this purpose the horse stand has to be shifted somewhere, the same would be done. The authorities would examine whether trotting of horses around the lake is also required to be prevented;(iv) Multi-storeyed group housing and commercial complexes have to be banned in the town area of Naini Tal. Building of small residential houses on flat areas could, however, be permitted;(v) The offence of illegal felling of trees is required to be made cognizable.(vi) Vehicular traffic on the Mall has to be reduced. Heavy vehicles may not be permitted to ply on Mall;(vii) The fragile nature of Ballia Ravine has to be taken care of. The cracks in the revetment of Ballia Nullah have to be repaired urgently.

In the "India Today" magazine, Prasanta Rajan, a journalist, in a preamble to the particular interest shown by the Lady District Magistrate of Nainital in restoration works of the lake has very vividly described the lake in these words:

Look for the lake through the colonial windows of Pant House, a vintage English bungalow on the hilltop, now submerged in wintry night, solitary with a kind of Wuthering Heights mystery. Down below, the lake is a laminated stillness, protected by seven never-sleeping hills. In the dead darkness of Kumaon, this magnificence is a distant, partially lit vision, less than real, as the hills of frozen memories make the lake a footnote in water.

== Other attractions ==
The Nainital Yacht Club, housed in the Boat House Club, offers yachting facilities at the lake, where a fleet of Half Raters, designed by Linton Hope, sails. It is also known for its boating, birding, and scenic views. The Annual Kingfisher Yachting Competition (Regatta) is held here in the third week of June. The Kumaon festival which brings out the local cultures and traditions is organized every year during the winter months of October and November, by the Tourism Department.

== Gallery ==
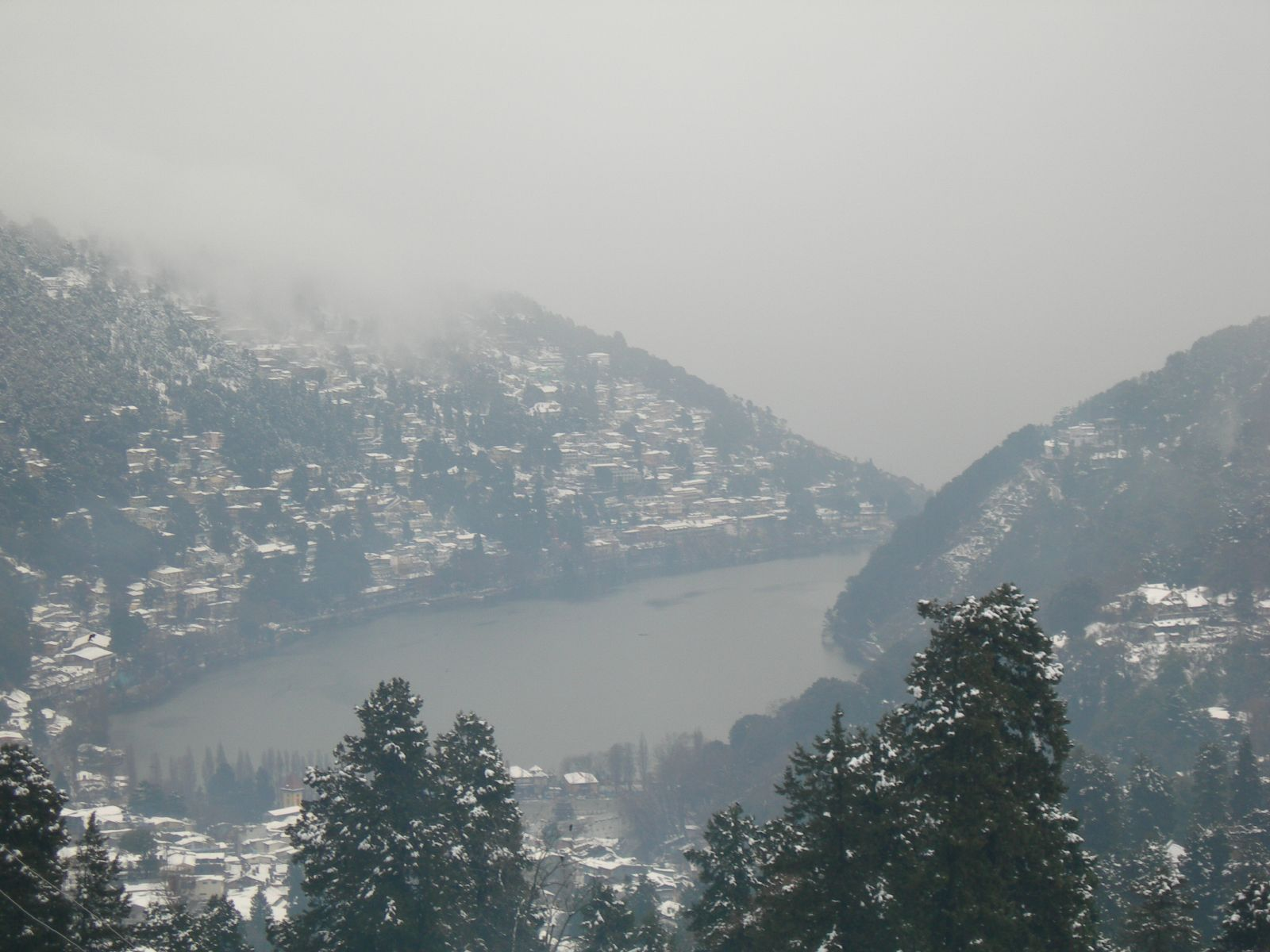
Picturesque view of the lake from the top of a hill

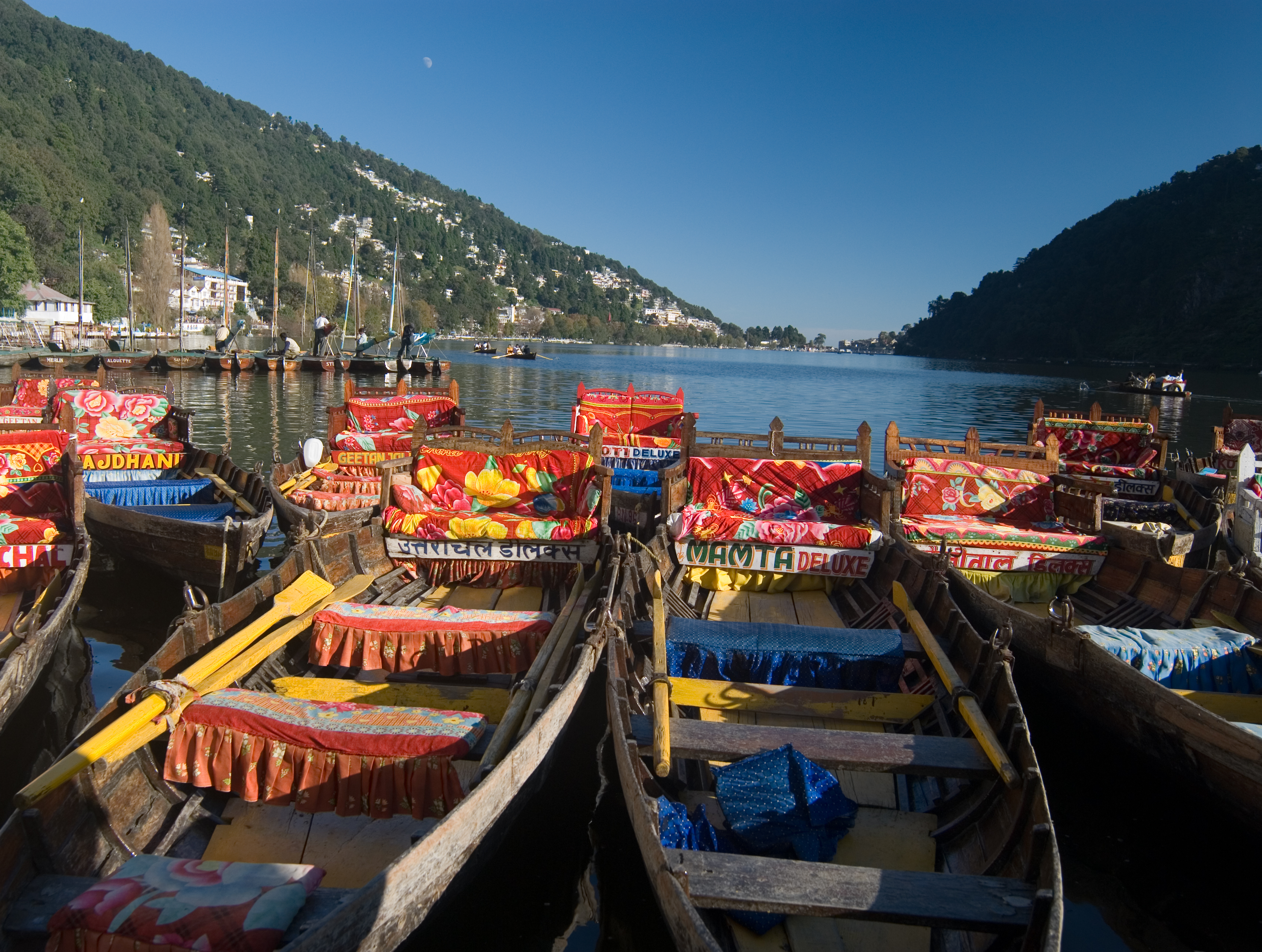
Boats warm the shores of the lake with all their colours

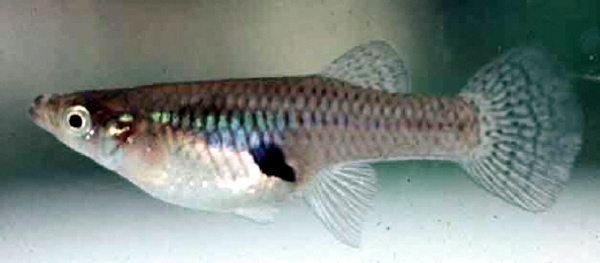
Mosquitofish introduced as a biocontrol measure to Control Mosquito Larvae in lake

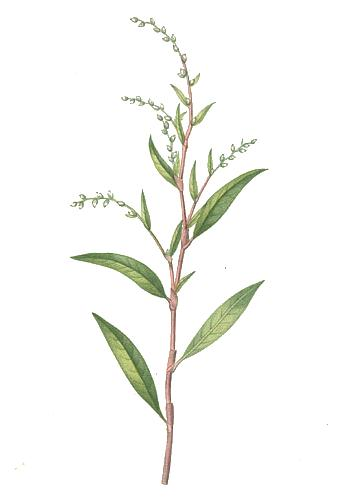
Water pepper or Polygonum hydropiper

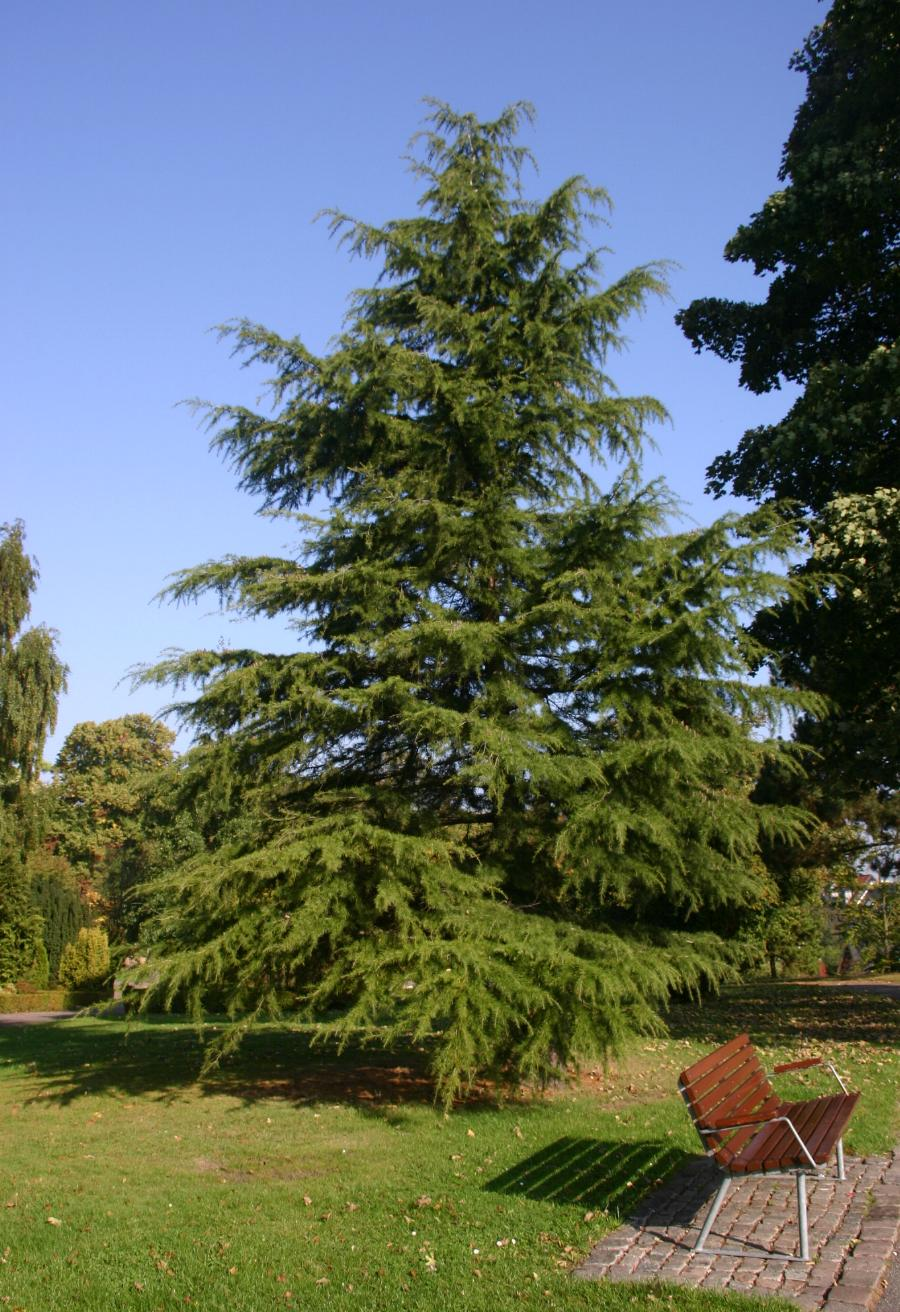
Deodar tree

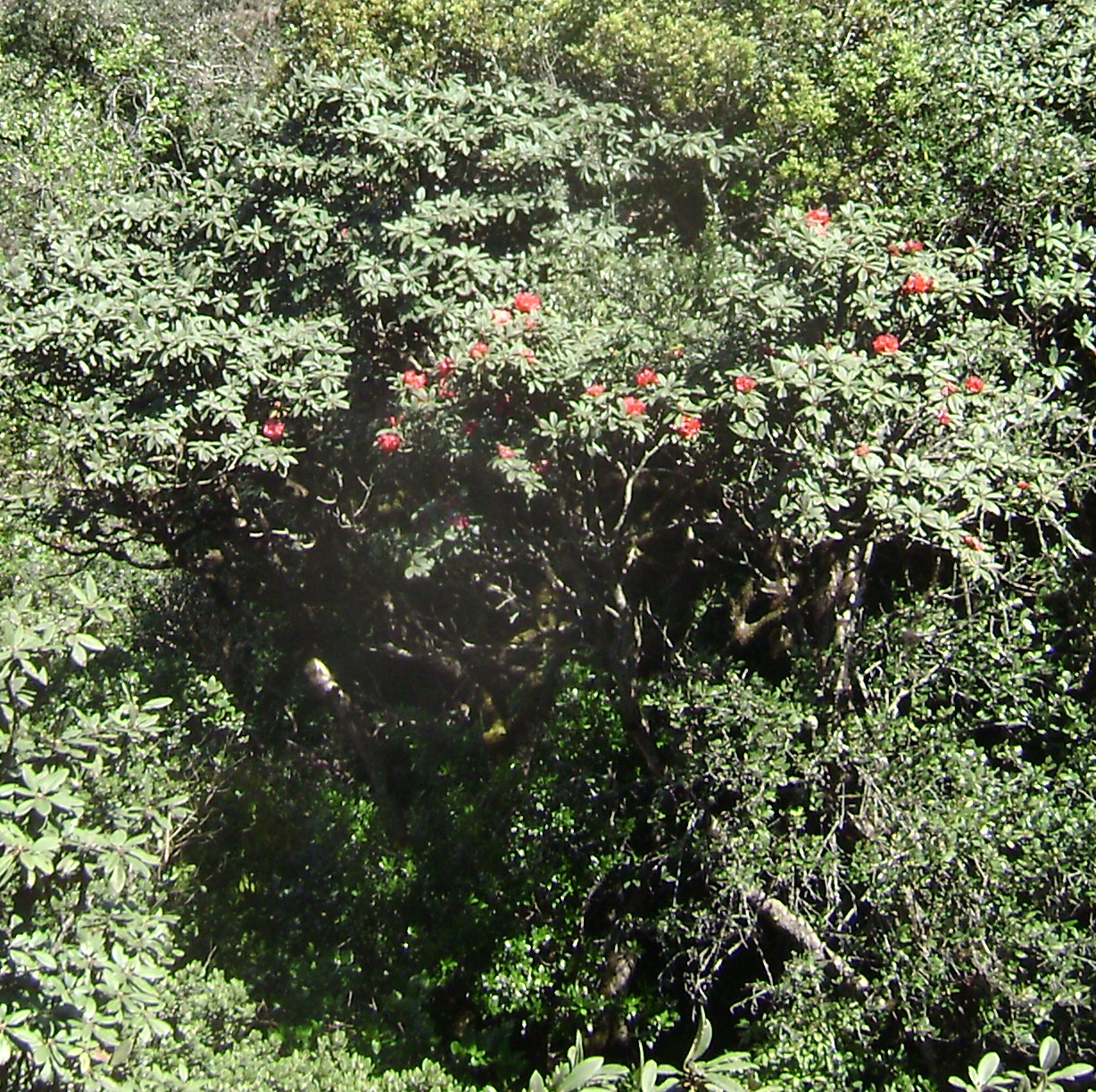
Rhododendron

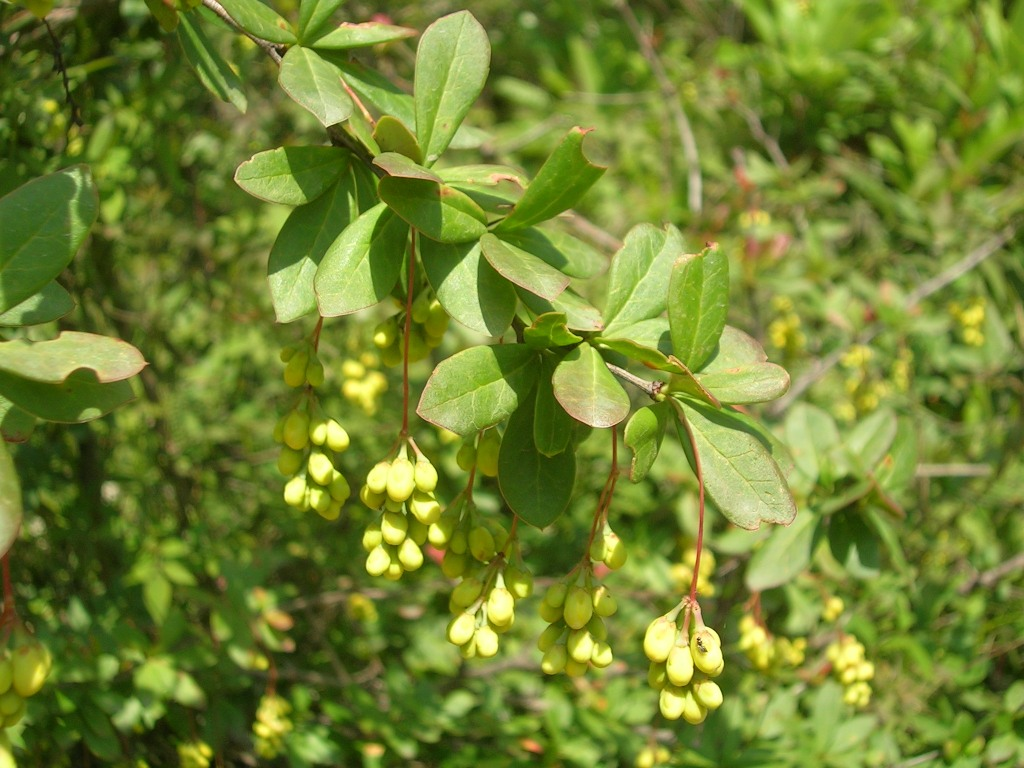
Berberis aristata, Uttarakhand

== See also ==
- Nainital
- Bhimtal Lake
- Lakes of Kumaon hills
