= Clement Town =

Clement Town Majra Clement Doon
- City
- Location in Uttarakhand, India Clement Town (India)
- Coordinates: 30°16′15″N 78°00′35″E
- Country: India
- State: Uttarakhand
- District: Dehradun

Government
  - Body: Cantonment board
- Elevation: 410 m (1,350 ft)

Population (2001)
  - Total: 19,634

Languages
  - Official: Hindi
  - Native: Garhwali, Jaunsari, Khariboli
- Time zone: UTC+5:30 (IST)
- PIN: 248002
- Vehicle registration: UK 07
- Website: uk.gov.in

Clement Town is a cantonment town in Dehradun, Dehradun district, in the state of Uttarakhand, India. Clement Town is seven kilometres (4.3 mi) from the clock tower in main city of Dehradun. Saharanpur and Haridwar are 65 and 54 km (40 and 34 mi) respectively. It also borders Rajaji National Park and is home to several renowned institutions. Schools such as Universal Academy and St. Patrick's Academy are in the neighbourhood. Country singer Bobby Cash resides in Clement Town.

== Geography ==
Clement Town has an average elevation of 410 metres (1,350 ft).

== Demographics ==
As of 2001 India census, Clement Town had a population of 19,634. Males constitute 58% of the population and females 42%. Clement Town has an average literacy rate of 85%, higher than the national average of 59.5%: male literacy is 92% and, female literacy is 79%. In Clement Town, 13% of the population is under 6 years of age.

== Government and politics ==
Clement Town is a Category-II cantonment, and deemed municipality administered by a cantonment board under the Ministry of Defence.

The municipal board consists of 14 members, of which seven are corporators elected from each ward in the municipality.

== Education ==
After the establishment of Indian Military Academy (IMA) at Dehradun in 1932, the Joint Services Wing (JSW) (National War Academy) was set up here on 15 December 1948, under the leadership of Colonel Kamta Prasad, which was renamed as National Defence Academy (NDA) on 1 January 1950, though in December 1954, the NDA was shifted to Khadakwasla near Poona. Graphic Era University, Graphic Era Hill University, St. Patrick's Academy, and Army Public School are also located in Clement Town.

== Notable sites ==
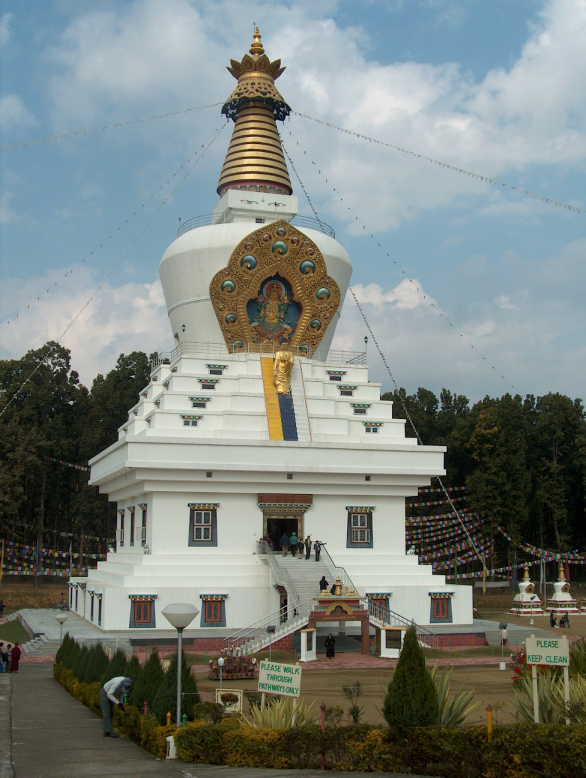
The re-established Mindroling Monastery in Clement Town

=== Mindrolling Monastery (Buddha Temple) ===
A large Tibetan settlement and the world's largest stupa of the re-established Mindroling Monastery from Tibet, is situated in Clement Town, which was inaugurated on 28 October 2002 and is surrounded by a 2-acre (8,100 m^{2}) garden.

There is also a 103 feet (31 m) high statue of Buddha dedicated to the Dalai Lama.

=== Tibetan Children's Home ===
Inspired by the 14th Dalai Lama's TCV (Tibetan Children's Village), The Tibetan Children's Home was established in Dhondupling Tibetan Colony, Clement Town, Dehra Dun, India on 18 March 1991. TCH was originally funded by the eleven-member Board of Directors, then was bought out by Mr. Sonam Singhe in 2004. This is a not-for profit boarding school that aids Tibetan children to get the education they need. TCH provides food, shelter, tutoring and transportation for the children living under poverty. Those that cannot afford to pay for these expenses are given grants and donations from charities such as Parimita Charitable Trust, the Tibetan Homes Foundation, the Tibetan Children's Fund, the Chenrezig Fund, the Social Justice Fund of the First Unitarian Society of Madison, and Lake Side Church. In 1992, the 14th Dalai Lama visited TCH and gave it his blessing and support. He praised the initiative for the work that has been done and presented TCH with a notable gift to help develop the facilities.
