= Bhimtal =

Town and municipality in Uttarakhand, India

Bhimtal भीमताल
- Town and Nagar Palika Parishad
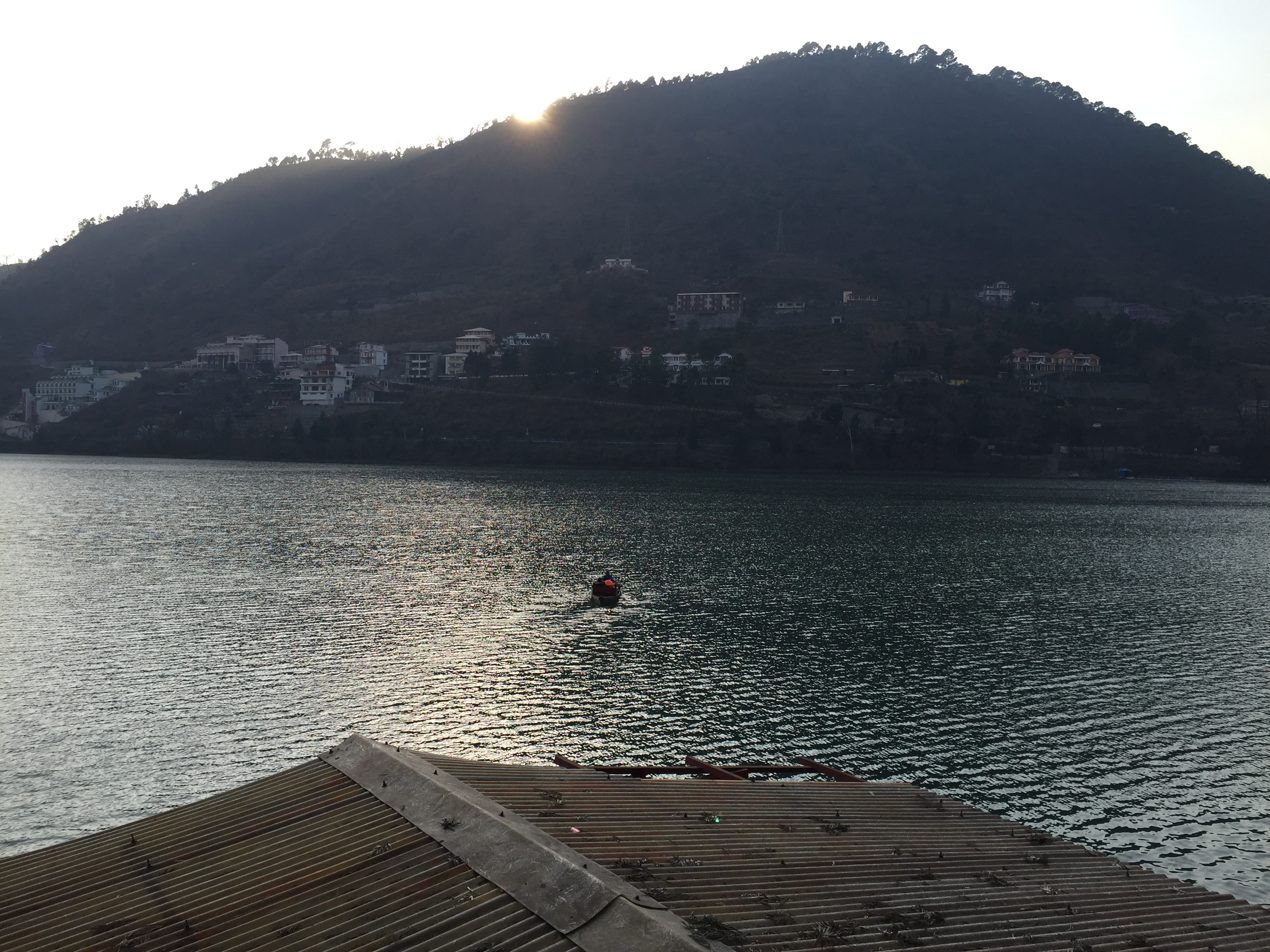
- Panorama of Bhimtal Lake and surrounding Himalayan ridges

- Location in Uttarakhand, India Bhimtal (India)
- Coordinates: 29.3500°N 79.5667°E
- Country: India
- State: Uttarakhand
- Division: Kumaon
- District: Nainital
- Sub-Tehsil: Bhimtal
- Tehsil: Nainital
- Community block: Bhimtal
- Victoria Dam built: 1883

Government
  - Type: Nagar Palika Parishad
  - Body: Bhimtal Nagar Palika Parishad

Area
  - Total: 6.54 km^{2} (2.53 sq mi)
- Elevation: 1,370 m (4,490 ft)

Population (2011)
  - Total: 7,722
  - Density: 1,180/km^{2} (3,060/sq mi)

Languages
  - Official: Hindi
  - Native / Regional: Kumaoni

Census (2011)
  - Sex ratio: 858 ♀/1000 ♂
  - Child sex ratio: 868 ♀/1000 ♂
  - Literacy rate: 93.67%
- Time zone: UTC+05:30 (IST)
- PIN: 263136
- Area code: +91 5942
- Vehicle registration: UK-04
- State Assembly: Bhimtal (58)
- Lok Sabha: Nainital–Udhamsingh Nagar
- Website: nainital.nic.in

Bhimtal ([bʱiːmˈtaːl]; Devanagari: भीमताल, Kumaoni: [bʱiːmˈtaːl]) is a municipal town, administrative tehsil headquarters, and intermontane lacustrine basin situated in the Nainital district of the northern Indian state of Uttarakhand. Located in the Outer Lesser Himalayas at an altitude of 1,370 metres (4,495 feet) above mean sea level, the town lies 22 kilometres east of Nainital, 21 kilometres north of the railway terminus at Kathgodam, and 30 kilometres north of the regional commercial centre of Haldwani.

The physical geography of the settlement is structured around Bhimtal Lake, a natural freshwater body covering 47.8 hectares, representing the largest lake by surface area in the Kumaon division. The lake features a natural volcanic bedrock island situated 91 metres from the southern dam embankment that accommodates a municipal public aquarium accessible by passenger ferry boats. (Note: The island was originally an unmanaged rocky outcrop before being developed with a state restaurant in the late 20th century, and subsequently restructured into a municipal freshwater aquarium exhibiting ornamental and native Himalayan aquatic fauna.) In October 2023, the Government of Uttarakhand formally elevated Bhimtal from a Nagar Panchayat to a Class-III Nagar Palika Parishad. (Note: The upgrade from Nagar Panchayat to Nagar Palika Parishad expanded municipal jurisdictional limits and institutional fiscal allocations for public utilities and civic infrastructure.) The town serves as an administrative hub hosting Vikas Bhawan, which accommodates the decentralized district rural development, agricultural, educational, and social welfare directorates for Nainital district.

== Toponymy and sacred geography ==
The name Bhimtal is a compound of Bhima, the second Pandava prince from the Sanskrit epic Mahabharata, and the word tal, meaning lake in the Kumaoni and Hindi languages. In the Manaskhanda section of the Skanda Purana, the central Kumaon lake district was anciently designated as Chhakhata (derived from the Sanskrit Shat-Khatt, meaning land of sixty lakes), with Bhimtal described as a primary sacred water body (tirtha). (Note: In colonial revenue and administrative surveys, the Chhakhata Pargana referred to the lake tract encompassing Bhimtal, Nainital, Sattal, Naukuchiatal, Malwatal, and surrounding water bodies.)

Regional Puranic traditions record that during the twelve-year forest exile (vanvas) of the Pandavas, the five brothers and Draupadi traversed the Kumaon hills. When Draupadi suffered from severe thirst and no surface stream could be located in the valley, Bhima struck his heavy iron mace (gada) into the bedrock, rupturing the strata and opening a subterranean artesian spring that inundated the depression to form the lake. To commemorate the event and offer veneration to Shiva, the Pandavas consecrated the stone Bhimeshwar Mahadev shrine on the southern shore.

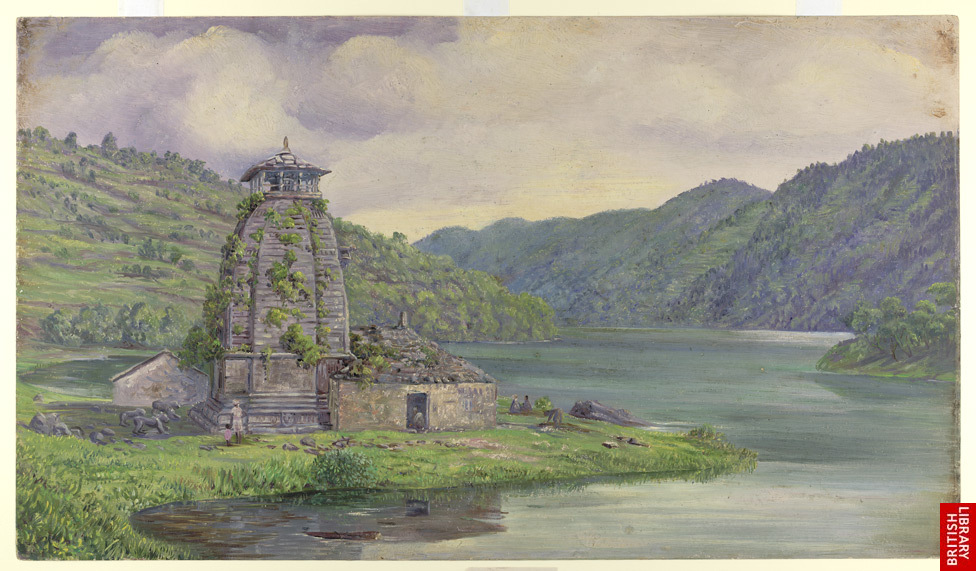
Bheemtal, Kumaon, India, July 30 1878, an oil painting by Marianne North.

== History ==
=== Prehistoric and early medieval periods ===
Archaeological explorations in the central Kumaon basin have identified prehistoric and protohistoric settlement remains, including rock cup-marks, microlithic stone tools, and megalithic burial cairns across Khutani and the adjacent Bhowali-Bhimtal ridgelines. From the seventh to the eleventh centuries AD, the region was governed by the Katyuri kings from their royal seats at Joshimath and Baijnath. Under Katyuri administration, Bhimtal functioned as a fortified military and trade outpost monitoring the caravan tracks connecting the Terai and Bhabar agricultural lowlands with the upper Himalayan river valleys.

=== Chand dynasty ===
Following the decline of the Katyuri state, the valley came under the sovereign authority of the Chand kings of Kumaon, who ruled initially from Champawat and later from Almora. Under Chand administration, Bhimtal gained strategic importance as a caravan staging post along the royal highway linking the Rohilkhand plains with the capital at Almora. In 1667 AD, King Baz Bahadur Chand (reigned 1638 to 1678 AD), following military campaigns in the upper Himalayas and the lowlands, commissioned the complete reconstruction of the Bhimeshwar Mahadev Temple on the southern embankment of the lake, establishing tax-free land endowments (gunth) to fund its daily rituals and hereditary priesthood.

=== Gorkha conquest and British colonial administration ===
In 1790, military forces of the Gorkha Kingdom of Nepal crossed the Kali River, overthrew the Chand dynasty, and established military rule across Kumaon. Throughout the twenty-five years of Gorkha occupation, Bhimtal was maintained as a garrison post monitoring supply lines between the plains and the hill fortresses. Gorkha rule terminated following the Anglo-Nepalese War (1814 to 1816) and the signing of the Treaty of Sugauli in 1815, which incorporated Kumaon into the territories of the British East India Company.

Under British colonial administration, Bhimtal was developed as an essential rest encampment, staging post, and dak bungalow station for colonial officers, travelers, and military units journeying to Almora, Ranikhet, and Nainital. In 1883, the Irrigation Branch of the Public Works Department completed the construction of the Victoria Dam, a 485-metre-long masonry gravity dam built across the southeastern effluent outlet of Bhimtal Lake. (Note: The Victoria Dam was engineered by British irrigation officers to provide controlled discharge into the Gaula-fed canal system serving foothills agriculture, replacing an unreinforced natural earthen barrier.) The dam was engineered to regulate the perennial discharge feeding the canal network across the agricultural Bhabar tract below, while creating a paved lakeside promenade and terraced embankments that established the modern lake frontage.

=== Post-independence and municipal status ===
Following Indian independence in 1947, Bhimtal transitioned from a transit outpost into an administrative and educational centre. The Government of Uttar Pradesh, and later the Government of Uttarakhand following state formation on 9 November 2000, established the Vikas Bhawan complex to decentralize district governance from Nainital. In October 2023, the state cabinet sanctioned the formal upgrade of Bhimtal from a Nagar Panchayat to a Class-III Nagar Palika Parishad.

== Geology, stratigraphy, and tectonics ==
Bhimtal is situated in the Outer Lesser Himalayan tectonostratigraphic belt, positioned directly north of the Main Boundary Thrust and south of the Ramgarh Thrust. The bedrock geology of the valley is characterized by the Bhimtal Volcanics (also designated in geological literature as the Bhowali Volcanics), an extensive suite of Paleoproterozoic mafic volcanic rocks and associated sedimentary successions. (Note: Geochronological studies date the mafic lava flows and basic volcanic suites of Bhimtal and Bhowali to the Paleoproterozoic era, approximately 1800 to 1900 million years ago, making them distinct from younger Mesozoic trap formations.) These volcanic assemblages consist of spilitic basalts, chlorite tuffs, massive amygdaloidal basalts, and diabase intrusions. Geochemically, these metabasites are interbedded with and conformably overlain by the quartzites, conglomerates, and phyllites of the Nagthat Formation within the Jaunsar Group.

The lake basin of Bhimtal is structural and tectonic in origin rather than glacial. Geological investigations demonstrate that the lake basin was formed by neotectonic movements along regional transverse fault lines during the Quaternary period. Tectonic shearing and faulting altered local paleodrainage channels, while massive ancestral rockslides blocked the flow of ancient streams, forming an impounded lake basin. The surrounding valley walls exhibit prominent fault scarps, shattered quartzite formations, and colluvial debris fans. The valley falls in Seismic Zone IV of the national seismic hazard zonation map of India.

The intermontane basin is framed by three prominent mountain ridges:

Garg Parvat
Situated to the north, rising to an elevation of 1,780 metres, forming the hydrological watershed divide that feeds the Gaula River drainage system.
Hidimba Parvat
Situated to the northwest, rising to 1,620 metres, heavily forested and accommodating the Vankhandi ashram and wildlife sanctuary.
Karkotak Hill
Situated to the south, rising to 1,590 metres, capped by the ancient Karkotak Naga temple and overlooking the sub-Himalayan plains.

== Limnology and hydrology ==
Bhimtal Lake has a total surface water area of 47.8 hectares (0.478 square kilometres) at normal full supply level and drains a catchment basin measuring 17.12 square kilometres.

Morphometric and Limnological Attributes of Bhimtal Lake
| Attribute / Parameter | Value |
Spatial and Catchment Dimensions
| Surface water area | 47.8 ha (0.478 km^{2}) |
| Catchment basin area | 17.12 km^{2} |
| Maximum longitudinal length | 1,701 m |
| Maximum transverse width | 451 m |
| Elevation above mean sea level | 1,370 m |
Depth and Volumetric Capacity
| Maximum water depth | 18.0 m |
| Mean water depth | 11.5 m |
| Gross water storage capacity | 4.63 million m^{3} |
Physico-Chemical and Thermal Properties
| Thermal stratification regime | Warm monomictic |
| Water pH range | 7.2 to 8.6 |

Limnologically, Bhimtal Lake is classified as a warm monomictic water body. During the summer and monsoon months, the water column develops stable thermal stratification, featuring an upper warm epilimnion, a middle thermocline, and a cold bottom hypolimnion. As surface temperatures decline in December and January, the lake undergoes complete vertical mixing. Biological assessments of zooplankton diversity in the lake document Rotifera, Cladocera, and Copepoda populations whose seasonal density reflects the mesotrophic state of the water body.

Under the National Lake Conservation Plan and directives from the National Green Tribunal, conservation works have introduced mechanical aeration, constructed silt detention check-dams along seasonal stream inlets, enforced catchment reforestation, and commissioned a dedicated municipal Sewage Treatment Plant (STP) to curb untreated effluent ingress.

== Climate ==
Bhimtal experiences a temperate subtropical highland climate (Cwb transitioning to Cwa in the Köppen climate classification). The climate is strongly influenced by altitude, topographic aspect, and the seasonal rhythm of the Indian Summer Monsoon.

Summers extend from April to June, with mean daily maximum temperatures ranging between 25 and 29 degrees Celsius, and nighttime minimums between 13 and 17 degrees Celsius. The southwest monsoon season spans from late June through late September, delivering over 80 percent of the annual precipitation, with an average annual rainfall of 1,586.2 millimetres. Winters persist from December through February, with daily maximums between 14 and 16 degrees Celsius, nightly minimums between 3 and 5 degrees Celsius, regular frost in low-lying valley floors, and occasional snowfall on surrounding high peaks.

Climate data for Bhimtal (1991-2020 normals)
| Month | Jan | Feb | Mar | Apr | May | Jun | Jul | Aug | Sep | Oct | Nov | Dec | Year |
|---|---|---|---|---|---|---|---|---|---|---|---|---|---|
| Mean daily maximum °C (°F) | 15.2 (59.4) | 17.1 (62.8) | 21.8 (71.2) | 26.4 (79.5) | 28.9 (84.0) | 28.5 (83.3) | 25.2 (77.4) | 24.8 (76.6) | 24.6 (76.3) | 23.1 (73.6) | 19.8 (67.6) | 16.5 (61.7) | 22.7 (72.8) |
| Mean daily minimum °C (°F) | 3.2 (37.8) | 4.8 (40.6) | 8.5 (47.3) | 12.8 (55.0) | 16.2 (61.2) | 18.5 (65.3) | 18.8 (65.8) | 18.4 (65.1) | 16.8 (62.2) | 12.1 (53.8) | 7.6 (45.7) | 4.1 (39.4) | 11.8 (53.3) |
| Average precipitation mm (inches) | 38.5 (1.52) | 46.2 (1.82) | 35.1 (1.38) | 31.4 (1.24) | 72.8 (2.87) | 228.6 (9.00) | 458.2 (18.04) | 412.5 (16.24) | 205.4 (8.09) | 42.1 (1.66) | 8.6 (0.34) | 16.8 (0.66) | 1,596.2 (62.86) |
Source: India Meteorological Department

== Ecology and biodiversity ==
=== Forest associations and flora ===
The natural forest cover surrounding Bhimtal corresponds to the Western Himalayan broadleaf forests and Himalayan subtropical pine forests classifications. The plant cover is stratified across three distinct zones:

Banj Oak Zone
Northern and sheltered eastern slopes are dominated by Banj oak (Quercus leucotrichophora), accompanied by Buransh (Rhododendron arboreum), Kafal (Myrica esculenta), and Ayar (Lyonia ovalifolia).

Chir Pine Zone
Drier southern and western aspects feature stands of Chir pine (Pinus roxburghii), with an understory of Rubus ellipticus (Hisalu), Berberis asiatica (Kilmora), and Pyracantha crenulata (Ghingaru).

Riparian and Mixed Broadleaf Zone
Moist valley bottoms and stream banks support Indian horse chestnut (Aesculus indica), Himalayan alder (Alnus nepalensis), Himalayan cypress (Cupressus torulosa), and weeping willow (Salix babylonica).

=== Mammalian and avian fauna ===
The surrounding forests support mammalian fauna including the Indian leopard (Panthera pardus fusca), barking deer (Muntiacus muntjak), Himalayan goral (Naemorhedus goral), wild boar (Sus scrofa), yellow-throated marten (Martes flavigula), Indian crested porcupine (Hystrix indica), Asian palm civet (Paradoxurus hermaphroditus), rhesus macaque (Macaca mulatta), and Nepal gray langur (Semnopithecus schistaceus). Sporadic human-wildlife encounters on the forested municipal periphery have led to forest department monitoring and protective school closures. Herpetofauna include the Himalayan pit viper, trinket snake, and oriental garden lizard.

Over 200 resident and migratory bird species inhabit the lake basin. Resident birds include the kalij pheasant (Lophura leucomelanos), cheer pheasant (Catreus wallichii), red-billed blue magpie (Urocissa erythroryncha), great barbet (Psilopogon virens), grey-winged blackbird (Turdus boulboul), and white-throated laughingthrush (Garrulax albogularis). Winter migratory waterfowl include the mallard, common teal, common pochard, and great crested grebe.

=== Aquatic fauna and fishery research ===
The lake accommodates native and introduced coldwater fish species. Indigenous species include the endangered Golden mahseer (Tor putitora), snow trout (Schizothorax richardsonii), and small hill-stream cyprinids of the genera Garra and Puntius. Introduced commercial species include the mirror carp (Cyprinus carpio specularis) and scale carp (Cyprinus carpio communis). In 2026, researchers at the ICAR-Central Institute of Coldwater Fisheries Research (CICFR) in Bhimtal discovered a new species of hill-stream fish, expanding the taxonomical catalog of the upland waters.

=== Lepidoptera and entomology ===
Bhimtal is recognized in entomological research due to field studies conducted at the colonial Jones Estate. (Note: The Jones Estate was acquired in the mid-20th century by the naturalist family of Frederick Smetacek Sr., who assembled a major reference collection of Lepidoptera and established the Butterfly Research Centre.) Naturalists Frederick Smetacek Senior and Peter Smetacek documented 243 butterfly species and more than 800 moth species from the local watershed. Noted taxa include the golden birdwing, common peacock, Krishna peacock, Kaiser-i-Hind, Indian moon moth, and Atlas moth.

== Demographics ==
According to the official 2011 Census of India (Town Code 800334), Bhimtal had an urban resident population of 7,722 individuals living in 1,720 households. Males constituted 4,157 (53.84 percent) and females 3,565 (46.16 percent), yielding a sex ratio of 858 females per 1,000 males. Children aged 0 to 6 numbered 852 (11.03 percent of the total population), with a child sex ratio of 868 girls per 1,000 boys. The decadal growth rate between 2001 (5,875 inhabitants) and 2011 was 31.44 percent.

Demographic and Religious Profile of Bhimtal (Census 2001 vs 2011)
| Demographic Indicator | Census 2001 | Census 2011 | Decadal Change |
Population Structure and Gender
| Total population | 5,875 | 7,722 | +31.44% |
| Male population | 3,212 | 4,157 | +29.42% |
| Female population | 2,663 | 3,565 | +33.87% |
| Sex ratio (females per 1000 males) | 829 | 858 | +29 ♀ |
| Child population (0 to 6 years) | 664 | 852 | +28.31% |
| Child sex ratio (girls per 1000 boys) | 844 | 868 | +24 ♀ |
Social Composition and Education
| Scheduled Castes (SC) | 1,085 (18.47%) | 1,489 (19.28%) | +37.24% |
| Scheduled Tribes (ST) | 38 (0.65%) | 56 (0.73%) | +47.37% |
| Total literates | 5,082 | 6,434 | +26.60% |
| Effective literacy rate | 91.08% | 93.67% | +2.59% |
| Male literacy rate | 94.22% | 95.28% | +1.06% |
| Female literacy rate | 87.26% | 91.79% | +4.53% |
Religious Affiliation Breakdown (Census 2011)
| Hinduism | 6,933 | | 89.78% |
| Islam | 674 | | 8.73% |
| Sikhism | 55 | | 0.71% |
| Christianity | 48 | | 0.62% |
| Buddhism | 10 | | 0.13% |
| Other or unstated | 2 | | 0.03% |

The Scheduled Caste population stands at 19.28 percent (1,489 individuals), and Scheduled Tribes constitute 0.73 percent (56 individuals). The social matrix consists predominantly of Kumaoni Rajputs, Kumaoni Brahmins, and traditional Shilpkar artisan communities, alongside migrant trading groups from the northern plains.

The effective literacy rate is 93.67 percent, with 6,434 literate residents aged seven and above. Male literacy is 95.28 percent and female literacy is 91.79 percent, substantially above the Uttarakhand state average of 78.82 percent and the national Indian benchmark of 74.04 percent.

Kumaoni is the primary indigenous regional language, while Hindi serves as the official state language, medium of school instruction, and commercial lingua franca. English is widely used in technical universities, scientific research institutions, and the hospitality sector.

== Civic administration and politics ==
Bhimtal is administered by a Nagar Palika Parishad (Municipal Council) under the Uttarakhand Municipalities Act, partitioned into municipal wards that elect ward councillors every five years, headed by an executive President elected directly by the town electorate. The town serves as the administrative headquarters for Bhimtal Tehsil and the Bhimtal Community Development Block.

Vikas Bhawan, situated on the southern slopes overlooking the lake, is the decentralized administrative complex for Nainital district, accommodating the Chief Development Officer, the District Rural Development Agency, the Deputy Director of Agriculture, the District Social Welfare Directorate, the District Education Office, the Silk Department, and the Minor Irrigation Division.

In the Uttarakhand Legislative Assembly, the town forms part of the Bhimtal Assembly constituency (Constituency No. 58), represented by Ram Singh Kaira of the Bharatiya Janata Party following the 2022 general elections. In parliamentary representation, Bhimtal is part of the Nainital–Udhamsingh Nagar Lok Sabha constituency.

== Education and research ==
Bhimtal is home to several institutions of higher education and research. The town has campuses and colleges affiliated with Uttarakhand Technical University and Kumaun University, as well as institutions operated by national research organisations.

The Birla Institute of Applied Sciences (BIAS) is a technical institution in Bhimtal affiliated with Veer Madho Singh Bhandari Uttarakhand Technical University. It offers four-year B.Tech programmes in Computer Science and Engineering and Electronics and Communication Engineering, along with MCA and BCA programmes. The institute traces its origins to the establishment of a centre of the Birla Institute of Scientific Research in Bhimtal in 1969.

Graphic Era Hill University (GEHU) has a campus on Sattal Road in Bhimtal. The university was established under an Uttarakhand state Act in 2011, and the University Grants Commission lists Bhimtal as one of its campuses. The Bhimtal campus offers undergraduate, postgraduate and doctoral programmes in areas including engineering, computer applications, management, science, pharmacy, nursing and commerce.

The Sir J.C. Bose Technical Campus of Kumaun University is located in Bhimtal. The campus was established in 1997 and offers undergraduate and postgraduate programmes in technical, scientific, pharmaceutical and management disciplines. Other institutions affiliated with Kumaun University include Hermann Gmeiner Degree College and the SOS J.N. Kaul Institute of Education. Hermann Gmeiner Degree College offers B.A., B.Sc. and B.Ed. programmes, with its affiliation for the 2025–26 academic session recorded in orders issued by the Governor's Secretariat of Uttarakhand. The SOS J.N. Kaul Institute of Education provides teacher education and is recognised by the National Council for Teacher Education for the B.Ed. programme; its affiliation with Kumaun University is recorded in Uttarakhand government orders.

Bhimtal is also a centre for scientific research in fisheries and sericulture. The ICAR-Central Institute of Coldwater Fisheries Research (ICAR-CICFR) is based in the town. It was established in 1987 as the Directorate of Coldwater Fisheries Research and was upgraded to a Central Institute in February 2025. The institute conducts research in coldwater fisheries and aquaculture, including breeding and seed production of coldwater fish, aquaculture technologies, fisheries management and conservation. Research at the institute has included breeding and conservation work on mahseer and other coldwater fish species.

The Central Silk Board, under the Ministry of Textiles, operates the Regional Sericultural Research Station at Bhimtal. The station is involved in the production of Oak Tasar silkworm seed and forms part of the Central Silk Board's Oak Tasar seed-production network. Research and development related to Oak Tasar sericulture has been carried out at Bhimtal as part of the Central Silk Board's activities in Uttarakhand.

Schools in Bhimtal include SOS Hermann Gmeiner School, Mount Alvern School, Lakes International School, Atal Utkrisht Leelawati Pant Government Inter College, Government Girls Inter College and Bharatiya Shaheed Sainik School. SOS Hermann Gmeiner School and Lakes International School are affiliated with the Central Board of Secondary Education, while Mount Alvern School is affiliated with the Council for the Indian School Certificate Examinations.

== Culture, museums, and monuments ==
Lok Sanskriti Sangrahalaya (Folk Culture Museum)
Situated at Geeta Dham in Khutani, Bhimtal, established in 1983 by archaeologist, painter, and Padma Shri recipient Dr. Yashodhar Mathpal. The museum houses over 5,000 cataloged artifacts documenting the anthropological and artistic heritage of Kumaon, including carved wooden doorframes and windows (likhwar), indigenous agrarian implements, stone sculptures, metal utensils, traditional bridal costumes, ancient palm-leaf manuscripts, and life-size reproductions of prehistoric rock paintings from Bhimbetka and Lakhudiyar.

Butterfly Research Centre and Butterfly Museum
Located on the Jones Estate, containing a reference collection of over 2,500 cataloged specimens of butterflies and moths.

Bhimeshwar Mahadev Temple
A seventeenth-century stone temple on the southern lake shore adjacent to the Victoria Dam, reconstructed in 1667 AD by King Baz Bahadur Chand, displaying curvilinear shikhara architecture, a mandapa, and incorporated medieval Katyuri-era sculptures.

Karkotak Temple
An ancient serpent shrine atop Karkotak Hill dedicated to the serpent king Karkotaka, visited by devotees during the annual festival of Nag Panchami.

Nal Damyanti Tal
A natural sacred lake situated two kilometres northwest of Bhimtal, associated in regional folklore with King Nala and Queen Damayanti.

== Economy, utilities, and tourism ==
The local economy is driven by tourism, public administration, technical education, and mountain horticulture. Tourism centres on Bhimtal Lake, featuring municipal paddle boating, kayaking, island aquarium tours, and tandem paragliding operating from takeoff zones in Pandegaon and Naukuchiatal.

Public drinking water supply is treated and distributed by the Uttarakhand Jal Sansthan from lake pumping stations. The town is provided medical care through the Community Health Centre (CHC) Bhimtal and primary health sub-centres. Surrounding agricultural valleys produce stone fruits including peaches, plums, apricots, and pears, along with potatoes, ginger, and seasonal vegetables supplied to wholesale markets in Haldwani.

== Transport ==
Bhimtal is connected by paved highways, located 22 kilometres from Nainital, 30 kilometres from Haldwani, and 11 kilometres from Bhowali, where it intersects National Highway 109 linking to Almora and Ranikhet.

The nearest railhead is Kathgodam railway station (Station Code: KGM), situated 21 kilometres south, providing broad-gauge rail connectivity to New Delhi, Dehradun, Lucknow, and Kolkata.

Air connectivity is provided through Pantnagar Airport (IATA: PGH), situated 55 kilometres southwest in the Terai plains, offering commercial flights to New Delhi and Dehradun, while Bareilly Airport (IATA: BEK) is located 120 kilometres south in Uttar Pradesh.

== Nearby settlements and lake circuit ==
Bhimtal forms part of the network of hill settlements and lake destinations in the Nainital district. It is connected by road with Sattal, Naukuchiatal, Bhowali, Ghorakhal and Kainchi Dham. Uttarakhand Tourism includes Bhimtal, Sattal and Naukuchiatal in its Lakes of Kumaon tourism circuit, along with Naini Lake at Nainital.

Sattal is a group of seven interconnected freshwater lakes surrounded by oak and other forest vegetation. The lakes include Nal Damyanti, Panna or Garuda, Ram, Lakshman, Sita, Purna and Sukh Tal. Sattal is located about 23 km from Nainital and is connected by road with Bhimtal and Bhowali. The area is known for birdwatching, boating and walking trails through the surrounding forests.

Naukuchiatal lies about 4 km from Bhimtal and is known for its nine-cornered lake. The lake is about 983 metres long, 693 metres wide and has a maximum recorded depth of 40.3 metres. The surrounding area is used for boating, angling and birdwatching, with paragliding also available in the vicinity.

Bhowali is about 11 km from Bhimtal and serves as a road junction for several destinations in the Kumaon hills. It is known as a fruit market and lies on routes towards Nainital, Bhimtal, Mukteshwar and other hill settlements. Ghorakhal, near Bhowali, is known for the Golu Devta temple and the Sainik School, Ghorakhal . Ghorakhal is also associated with the region's tea plantations.

Kainchi Dham is a pilgrimage centre on the Nainital-Almora road, about 8 km from Bhowali and 17 km from Nainital. It consists of a Hanuman temple and ashram founded by Neem Karoli Baba in 1962.

== See also ==
- Bhimtal Lake
- Naukuchiatal
- Sattal
- Bhowali
- Nainital
