= Birla Institute of Applied Sciences =

Birla Institute Applied Sciences
- Established: 1969
- Founders: G. P. Birla, C. K. Birla
- Affiliations: Uttarakhand Technical University.
- Director: Binod Kumar Singh
- Academic staff: 23
- Students: 570
- Undergraduates: 180 annual intake
- Postgraduates: 18 annual intake
- Location: Bhimtal, Uttarakhand, India
- Campus: Rural
- Website: Official Website

Birla Institute of Applied Sciences (BIAS), is a higher education institute located in Bhimtal, Uttarakhand, India. It is a sister institute to the Birla Institute of Technology Mesra, Ranchi. Formerly affiliated to Kumaon University, it is affiliated to Uttarakhand Technical University.

== Location ==
Birla Institute Of Applied Sciences is located in Bhimtal, in the Nainital district of Uttarakhand. The campus is spread over an area of about 10 hectares (25 acres).

== Academics ==
The institute offers full 4-year B.Tech courses and a 3-year MCA course, as well as various training programs and certification courses.

Undergraduate courses admission is through Joint Entrance Examination (JEE) conducted by the National Testing Agency (NTA) formerly conducted by CBSE.The counselling process is done by Uttarakhand Technical University. Postgraduate course admission is based on a common entrance test conducted by Uttarakhand Technical University. Admissions are also offered based on Class XII percentages through spot counselling.

== Infrastructure ==
The institute campus consists of a central academic block, laboratory blocks, workshops, computer centers and staff quarters besides separate hostels for boys and girls. The institute is fully residential and includes the mess, common room. The institute is self-contained with its own security arrangements, co-operative store, cafeteria and a PCO to take care of the sundry needs of the residents.

The central academic block consists of lecture halls, computer labs, a well-equipped library, and an IEEE Digital Library access. It also houses the conference room and various offices. The institute offers an ensconced environment for the students. It also has a library with many academic books as well as novels.
