= Bhimtal Lake =

Lake in Uttarakhand, India

Bhimtal
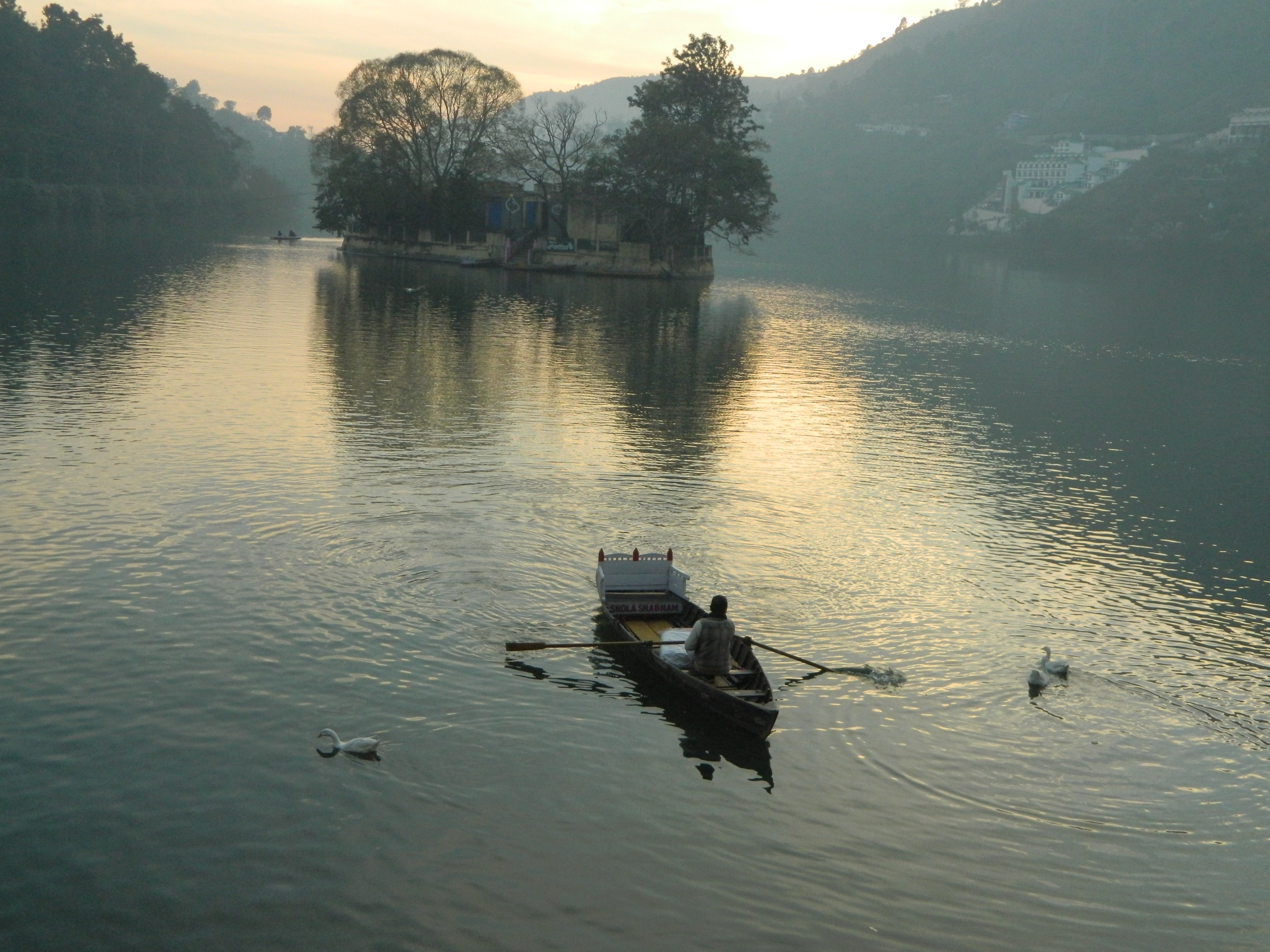
- A Bhimtal lake dweller with his boat on the Lake

- Location within Uttarakhand Location within India
- Interactive map of Bhimtal
- Location: Bhimtal Town, Nainital District, Kumaon, Uttarakhand
- Coordinates: 29°20′35″N 79°33′33″E
- Type: Gravity Masonry
- Catchment area: 17.12 square kilometres (6.61 sq mi)
- Basin countries: India
- Surface area: 47.8 hectares (118 acres)
- Water volume: 4.63×10^{6} m^{3} (164×10^{6} cu ft)
- Islands: 1
- Settlements: Bhimtal

Bhimtal is a lake in the town of Bhimtal, near Nainital city in Nainital district of Kumaon, India with a masonry dam built in 1883 creating the storage facility. It is the largest lake of Nainital district, as well as Kumaon, which is known as the "Lake district of India". It's the 2nd largest lake by surface area in Uttarakhand. The lake provides drinking water supply and supports aquaculture with variety of fish species. There is an island at the center of the lake which has been developed as a tourist attraction and has an aquarium.

== Geography ==
Bhimtal Lake is 22.5 kilometers (14.0 mi) away from the district town of Nainital. Kathgodam is the nearest rail-head which is 20 kilometers (12 mi) away.

The lake and the dam are located at an elevation of 1,375 meters (4,511 ft) in Bhimtal town in the Nainital district in Uttarakhand. The lake drains a catchment area of 17.12 square kilometers (6.61 sq mi).

According to geologists the origin of the lake is attributed to a number of faults which occurred due to shifting of the Earth's crust. This caused blockade of the overland flows and resulted in creation of the lake. The catchment area of the lake, particularly the hills have dense forest cover; the type of forest vegetation consists of chir pine, ban oak and mixed deciduous forests. The basin experiences varying tropical to sub-tropical weather conditions. Precipitation in the basin is very high, mostly occurring during the monsoon period.

A peripheral road on the banks of the lake provides clear views of fish life in the lake. The lake has steep banks covered with shingle at lower elevations and bushes and grass at higher elevations. The western side of the lake is a forest area where cottages have been built; while on the opposite side there are terraced fields. A perennial tributary stream feeds the lake from the west and the banks of this stream have been extensively developed with residential complexes, after Indian Independence, which has brought in shale and debris into the lake, and this process is said to be still continuing. There is a small shopping centre on the southern shore of the lake. A small sanitarium on the northern shore of the lake at 1,525 meters (5,003 ft) elevation is said to be free from malaria and hence healthy. There is also a prison camp which was established in 1902 here at the northern end of the lake to house prisoners of the Boer war.

== History ==
The dam was built in 1883 when Kumaon region was under the British Raj following the Anglo-Nepal War (1814–16). Nainital had then been established as their summer capital.

The town and the lake are named after Bhima, one of the Pandavas of the epic story of Mahabharata who is said to have visited the place. On the banks of the dam there is an old temple which was built by Raja Baj Bahadur Chand of Kumaon Kingdom during the 17th century.

== Features ==
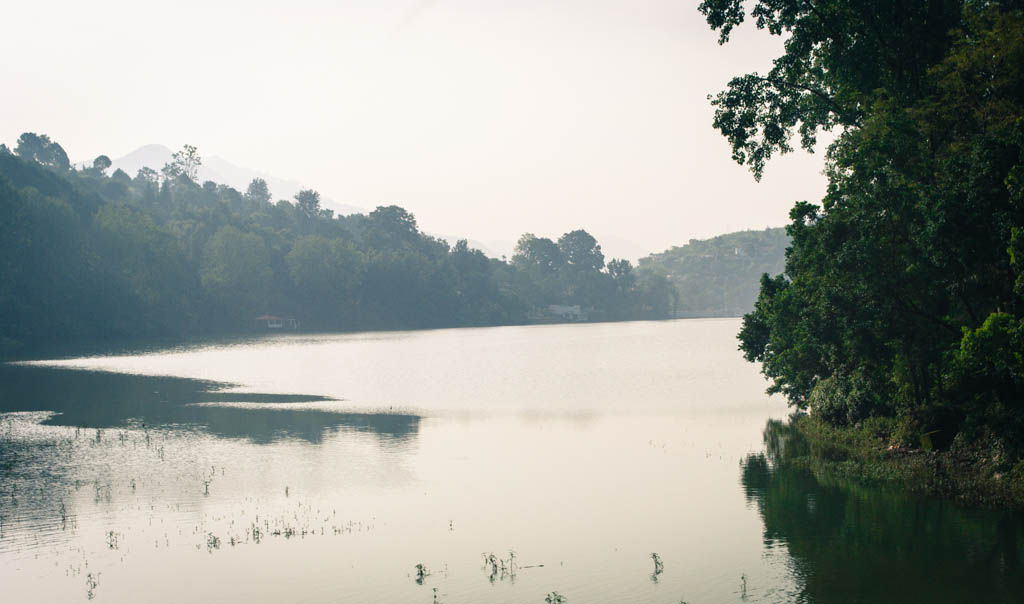
Water spread of the lake

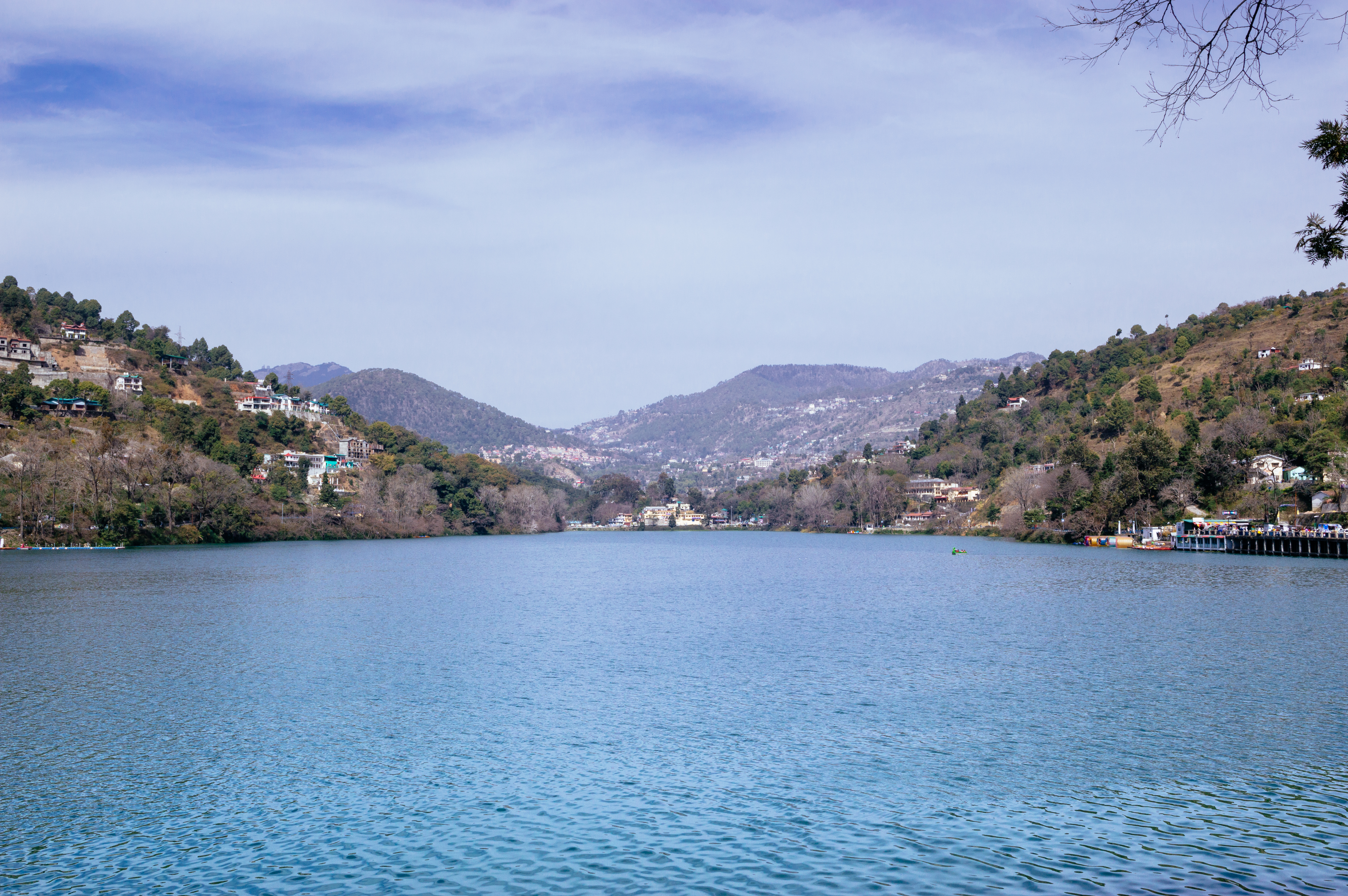
Panoramic view of Bhimtal lake from Aquarium Island Cafe by The Lake Hill

The C-shaped lake, which is the largest in the Kumaon region, impounded by the masonry dam has an area of 47.8 hectares (118 acres). It has a gross storage capacity of 4.63 million cubic meters (164×10^{6} cu ft) with a live storage of 3.54×10^{6} m^{3} (125×10^{6} cu ft). The surface inflow into the reservoir is only 1.756×10^{6} m^{3} (62.0×10^{6} cu ft) and the balance storage is contributed by subsurface sources. The reservoir has been classified as manomictic with stratification extending over a period from March to November, with one "inner circulation." There is inflow of sediment from the catchment due to intense building activity on the banks. This has necessitated dredging of the lake regularly. Lake water which is generally clear, gets a brown coloration during some months as a result of infused animalcule. According to a local myth the coloration disappears once the lake claims a victim. The stored water is released through an outlet leading to the Gola River which is utilized to supplement the flows of the Bhabar canals. As the reservoir water is released, the water surface area of the lake gets reduced, when the water getting released, by 11 metres (36 ft) with consequent reduction of the size of the reservoir to half its original spread. Water quality of the lake is in a "retrogressive ecological change" on account of a) sewage disposal, sediment inflow, and tourists' pressure causing waste disposal. This has resulted in dissolved oxygen level recorded at harmful levels to both domestic consumption and pisciculture. Nitrate level is also stated to be high at 350 mg per liter which is considered a "pre-eutrophication stage". In the bed of the lake there are deposits of injurious matter and as a result fish mortality rate is high and the quality of drinking water has also suffered.

As the lake water is polluted with organic matter, it is in a mesotrophic state due to disposal of sewage directly into the lake from the residential complex built around the periphery of the lake. It has now been planned to build a sewer line around the periphery of the lake to trap all the sewage from the residential areas and prevent it from entering the lake. A treatment plant to treat the waste water is also part of the waste water treatment process.

The picturesque island at the middle of the lake has recreation facilities including an aquarium and is approached by rowing boats.

== Dam ==
The dam which has created the lake is a masonry structure built at the center to a height of 14.8 m (48.5 ft). It has a length 150 m (500 ft). The base of the dam at the center has a width of 11 m (36 ft) which reduces to a top width of 3.0 m (10 ft). The dam is designed to pass a flood discharge of 45 m^{3}/s (1,600 cu ft/s) through a chute spillway which is fitted with 12 gates. The dam is located in the Seismic Zone IV.

== Wildlife ==
Wildlife seen around the lake are barking deer, Kalij pheasants, Koklass pheasants white-capped laughingthrush and migratory ducks and geese.

== Fisheries ==
The fish species found in the lake are common snowtrout, catla, rohu, silver carp (Hypophthalmichthys molitrix) and grass carp (Ctenopharyngodon idella). Also recorded in the lake waters are Common carp (Cyprinus carpio) and major carps (Labeo rohita, Cirrhinus mrigala and catla catla). A fish farm has been set up in the Bhima Tal. Every year large fish yields from the lake are of Mahseer, and Tor putitora) species. It is essential to get the permission of the Deputy Commissioner to fish in the lake.

== See also ==
- Lakes of Kumaon hills
- Nainital Lake

== Bibliography ==
- Bhatt, Shanker D.; Pande, Ravindra K. (1 January 1991). Ecology of the Mountain Waters. APH Publishing. ISBN 978-81-7024-366-3.
- Bruyn, Pippa de; Venkatraman, Niloufer; Bain, Keith (10 May 2006). Frommer's India. John Wiley & Sons. p. 2. ISBN 978-0-471-79434-9.
- Dehadrai, P. V.; Das, P.; Verma, Sewa Ram (1 January 1994). Threatened Fishes of India: Proceedings of the National Seminar on Endangered Fishes of India Held at National Bureau of Fish Genetic Resources, Allahabad on 25 and 26 April 1992. Nature Conservators. ISBN 978-81-900467-0-1.
- Nag, Prithvish (1 January 1999). Tourism and Trekking in Nainital Region. Concept Publishing Company. ISBN 978-81-7022-769-4.
- Negi, Sharad Singh (1991). Himalayan Rivers, Lakes, and Glaciers. Indus Publishing. ISBN 978-81-85182-61-2.
- Sehgal, Krishan Lal (1992). Recent researches in coldwater fisheries: National Workshop on Research and Development Need Coldwater Fisheries, 30–31 January 1989. Today & Tomorrow's Printers & Publishers. ISBN 9781555282653.
- Shah, Giriraja (1 January 1999). Nainital: The Land of Trumpet and Song; Based on J.M. Clay's Book on Nainital. Abhinav Publications. ISBN 978-81-7017-324-3.
- Tyagi, Nutan (1991). Hill Resorts of U.P. Himalaya,: A Geographical Study. Indus Publishing. p. 78. ISBN 978-81-85182-62-9.
