= Graphic Era University =

Private university in Uttarakhand, India

Graphic Era (Deemed to be University)
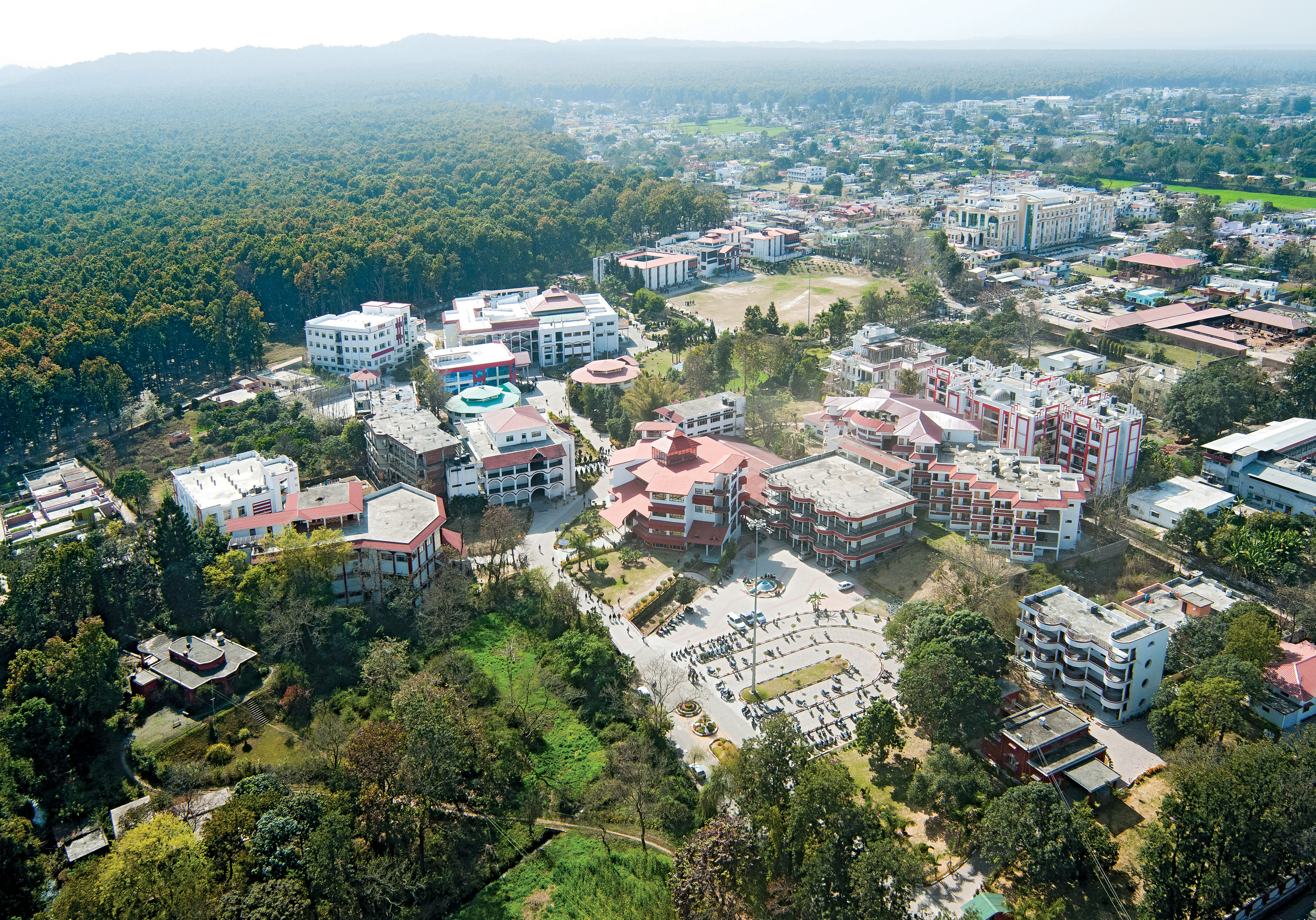
- Former name: Graphic Era Institute of Technology (GEIT)
- Motto: Transforming Dreams into Reality
- Type: Deemed to be University
- Established: 1993; 33 years ago
- Founder: Dr. Kamal Ghanshala (President)
- Accreditation: UGC, NAAC, MHRD, AICTE, NIRF
- Academic affiliations: AIU
- Chancellor: Dr. Vijay Kumar Saraswat
- Vice-Chancellor: Narpinder Singh
- Academic staff: 442
- Administrative staff: 244
- Students: 7584 (undergrad and postgrad)
- Doctoral students: 326
- Location: 566/6, Bell Road, Society Area, Clement Town, Dehradun, Uttarakhand, 248002, India; 30.2675°N 77.9959°E
- Campus: 25 acres (100,000 m^{2}) Urban
- Advisor: R. C. Joshi
- Colors: Red, white and black
- Website: www.geu.ac.in

Graphic Era (Deemed to be) University (formerly known as Graphic Era Institute of Technology) is an Indian private graphic university located in Clement Town, Dehradun, Uttarakhand. It was founded by Dr. Kamal Ghanshala in 1993.

In 2008, the institution was granted the status of a deemed university. In 2022, it received accreditation from the National Assessment and Accreditation Council (NAAC) with a Grade A+. The National Institutional Ranking Framework ranked it 72nd overall in India in 2025 and 52nd in the engineering category.

Grafest is a yearly college festival held at the university.

== See also ==
- Graphic Era Hill University
