= Naini Tal Yacht Club =

Yacht Club in Nainital, India

Coordinates: 29°23′28″N 79°27′23″E

- Club badge

- The club burgee
- Short name: N.T.Y.C.
- Founded: 1910; 116 years ago
- Location: Nainital Lake, India
- Website: boathouseclub.in

Naini Tal Yacht Club is a yacht club based on Nainital Lake, India. At an elevation of 2,084 m (6,837 ft), it is the highest yacht club in India and amongst the highest in the world. There have been two iterations of the club: the first under Naini Tal Club Ltd from 1910 to 1947, and a second from 1948 to the present under the Boat House Club Ltd.

== History ==
During the British Raj, Nainital was the summer capital of the United Provinces from the middle of April to the middle of October. The earliest records of sailing on Nainital Lake are from 1880, when lead keeled cutter type yachts were used. In 1897, the Naini Tal Sailing Club was established and the "Sorceress" type of yachts were used for many years. The Naini Tal Yacht Club was founded in 1910 by the Carey brothers: C. W. Carey, a Major in the Corps of Guides, and F. Carey, a captain in the Royal Artillery. The brothers introduced a one-design yacht class, and the club acquired several yachts designed by Linton Hope and constructed by Turks & Co. of Kingston upon Thames. Known as "Linton Hope Half-Raters", they were specially designed to suit the wind conditions on the Nainital Lake, and apart from India are only found in the Royal Norfolk and Suffolk Yacht Club in England.

Most of the club's members were British, and with the end of the British Raj in 1947, the Naini Tal Club Ltd was dissolved. However, the club's Indian members and a number of British members who remained in India wished to keep the club going. They negotiated to purchase many of the club's assets and to take over the lease to the boat house building, and in 1948 the Boat House Club Ltd was established.

The first Indian commodore, Raj Kumar Giriraj Singh, was appointed in 1957. Yachting on the lake was reserved for members until 1970, but today non-members and tourists can sail for a fee.

== Events and cups ==
Historically, the club awarded nine cups:

- The Baker Russell Challenge Cup, presented by General Sir Baker Russell in 1898 and awarded to the victor of a three day handicap race.
- The Benares Challenge Cup, presented by the Kunwar Sahib of Benares in 1910 for a two day level race.
- The One Design Points Cup, presented by Major F. Carey, Royal Artillery, in 1910.
- The Open Handicap Points Cup, presented by the founder members of the club in 1910. Both this cup and the One Design Points Cup were raced for throughout the season on alternate days, and the cups were won by the yacht with the lowest total of points in proportion to number of starts.
- The Lady Leslie Porter Challenge Cup, presented in 1911; a one day handicap cup.
- The Inter-Club Challenge Trophy, presented in 1912 by James Meston, the then commodore of the N.T.Y.C. and Lieutenant-Governor of the United Provinces of Agra and Oudh, and the Sailing Committee of the Royal Bombay Yacht Club. It was sailed for by crews of the R.B.Y.C. and the N.T.Y.C. It consisted of two matches of three races each, with the first match sailed at Nainital in September, and the second in Bombay in March.
- The All-India Challenge Cup, presented by the Nawab of Rampur in 1912 and open to any yacht or sailing club in India. The competition consisted of two days’ racing sailed at Nainital.
- The Ladies’ Challenge Cup, presented by the N.T.Y.C. in 1923, was sailed for in one day’s racing by ladies who have sailed during the season.
- The Helmsman’s Challenge Cup, presented by W. F. Brandford in 1924 and sailed for throughout the season. It was awarded to the helmsman with the lowest aggregate of points.

The ordinary course for all races was three times round the lake, round four buoys.

After the British left India, sailing declined in the region. To encourage yacht sailing and boost water sports tourism, the Governor of Uttarakhand in 2014 launched, after a gap of four decades, the Governor's Gold Cup Sailing Regatta, an annual three-day event where sailors from across India compete in the races.

== Gallery ==
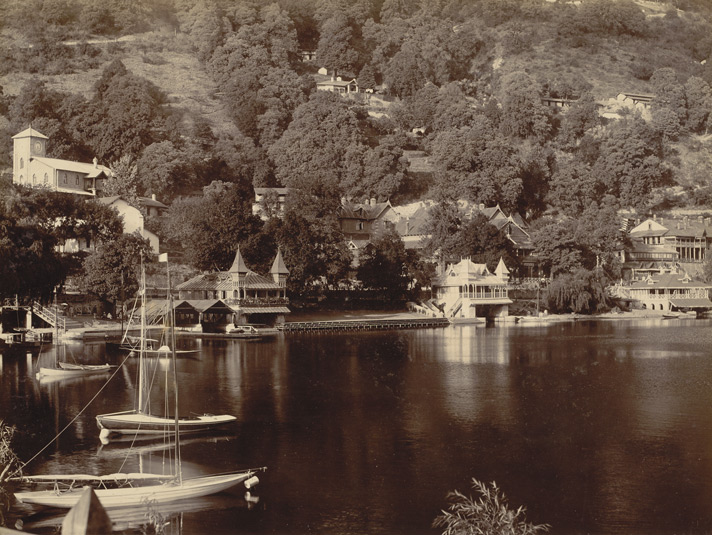
An 1899 image of the boathouse and yachts

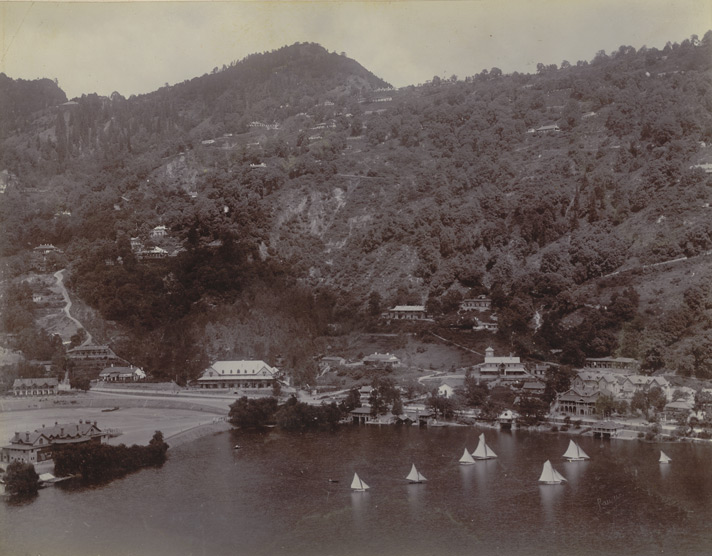
An 1899 image showing yachts on Nainital Lake

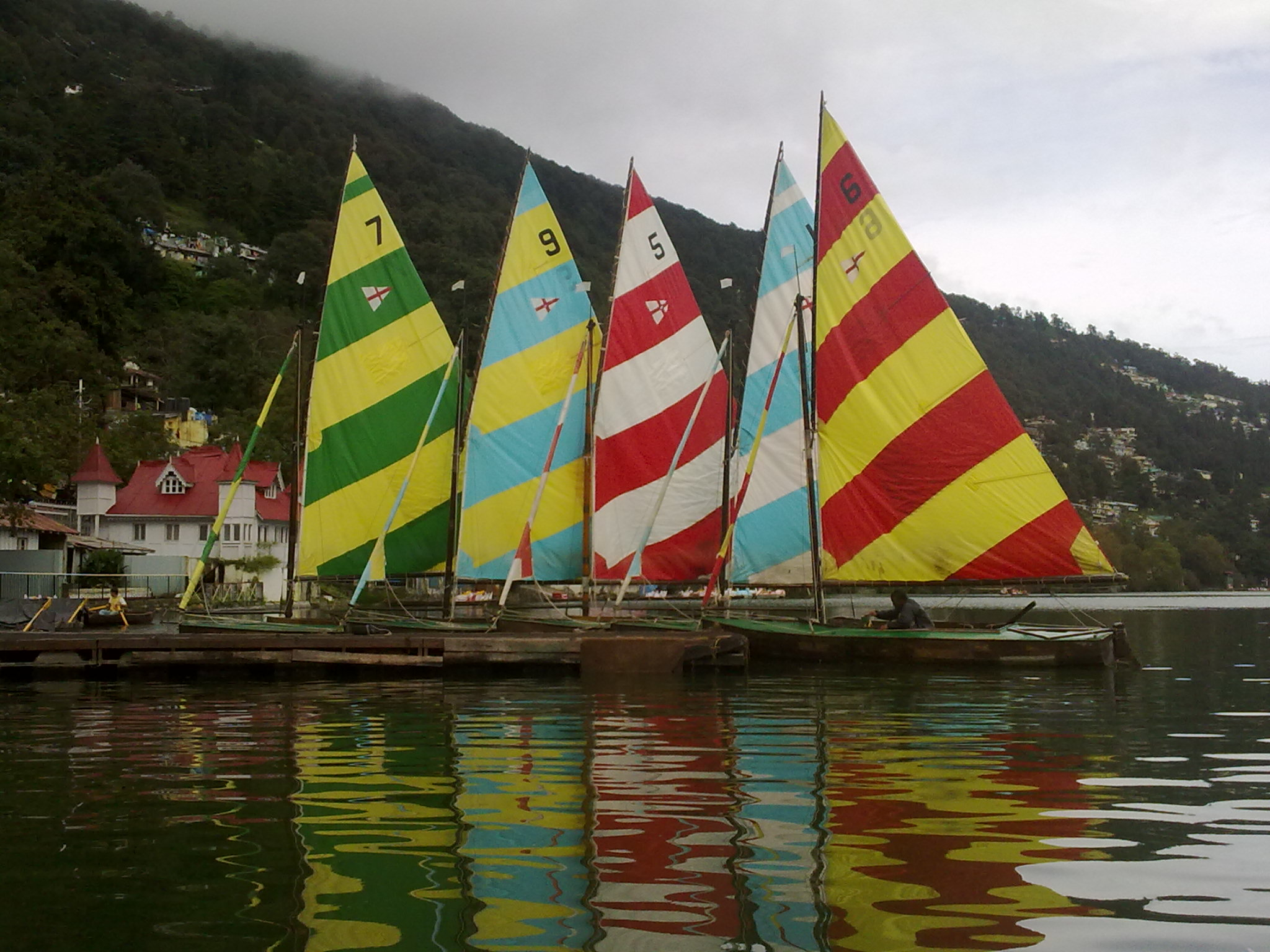
Yachts on the lake today

== Bibliography ==
- Shah, Giriraja (1999). Nainital: The Land of Trumpet and Song. Abhinav Publications. ISBN 9788170173243.
