= Mindrolling Monastery =

Tibetan Buddhist monastery in Zhanang County, Tibet, China

- སྨིན་གྲོལ་གླིང་དགོན་པ་
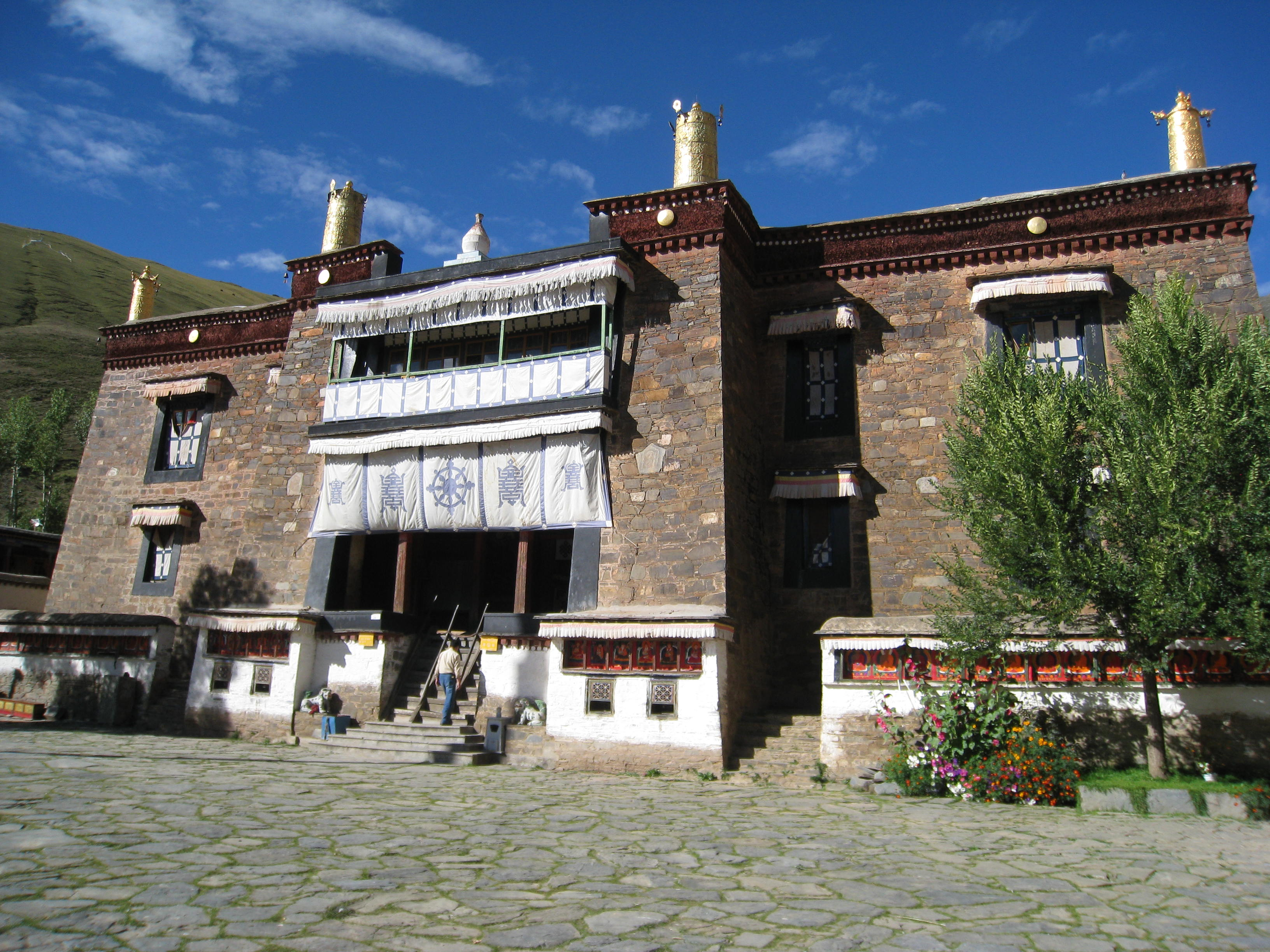
- Mindrolling Monastery, Tibet Autonomous Region

- Location within Tibet

Religion
- Affiliation: Tibetan Buddhism

Location
- Location: Lhasa Prefecture, Tibet Autonomous Region, China
- Interactive map of Mindrolling Monastery
- Coordinates: 29.18519°N 91.40598°E

Architecture
- Established: 1676; 350 years ago

Mindrolling Monastery (Tibetan: སྨིན་གྲོལ་གླིང་དགོན་པ་, Wylie: min-dröl-ling gön-pa, THL: smin-grol-gling dgon-pa, English: "Sublime Island of Ripening Liberation") is one of the "Six Mother Monasteries" of the Nyingma school in Tibet. It was founded by Rigzin Terdak Lingpa in 1676. Terdak Lingpa's lineage is known as the Nyo lineage. The name in Tibetan means "Place of Perfect Emancipation". It is located in Zhanang County, Shannan Prefecture, Tibet Autonomous Region, China, known as U-Tsang. Mindrolling Monastery is approximately 43 kilometers east of the Lhasa airport, on the south side of the Tsangpo river.

== History ==
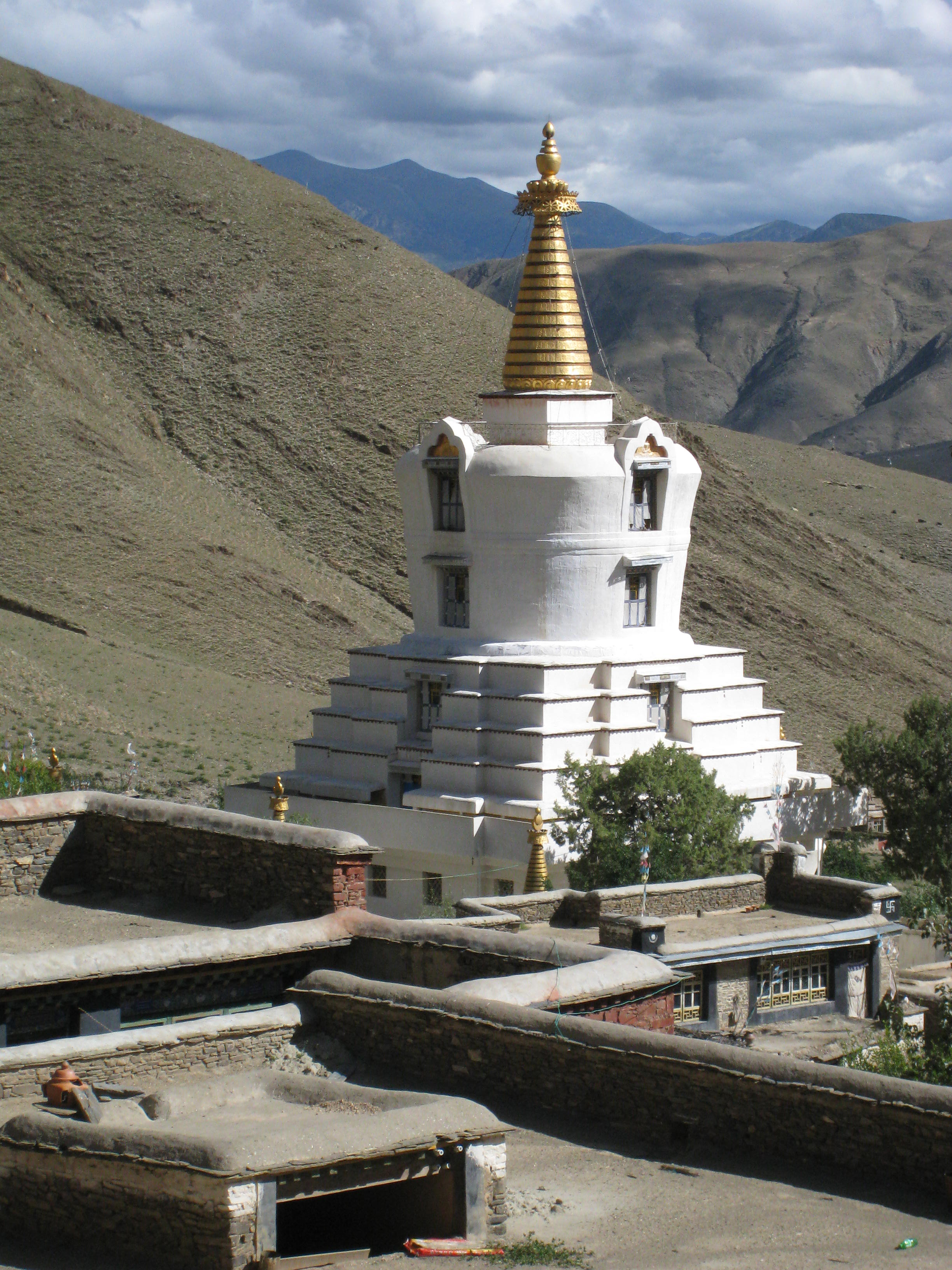
The stupa at the Mindrolling Monastery in Tibet.

Mindrolling was heavily damaged in 1718 by the Dzungar Mongols from Dzungaria. It was rebuilt during the reign of the Seventh Dalai Lama (1708–1757). Dungsay Rinchen-namgyel and Jetsunma Mingyur Paldron, the son and daughter of Terdak Lingpa, supervised its reconstruction.

For nearly 300 years its monastic university trained Nyingma scholars and yogis from all over Tibet.

At Mindrolling, special emphasis was placed on the learning of Buddhist scriptures, astronomy, Tibetan lunar calendar, calligraphy, rhetoric, and Traditional Tibetan medicine. Monks traditionally studied thirteen major sutra and tantra texts of the Nyingma, and learned the practices stemming from various terma, especially from the lineage of Terdak Lingpa. The monastery had at one time, over one hundred satellites and its throne holder was one of the most revered in Tibet.

At the time of the 1959 revolt against Chinese Communist rule in Central Tibet, there were approximately 300 monks at Mindrolling. In the years after 1959, the monastery again suffered damage to its buildings, but it was not as severe as at other monasteries such as Ganden. At present, the monastery is still being reconstructed in Tibet.

== Mindrolling in India ==
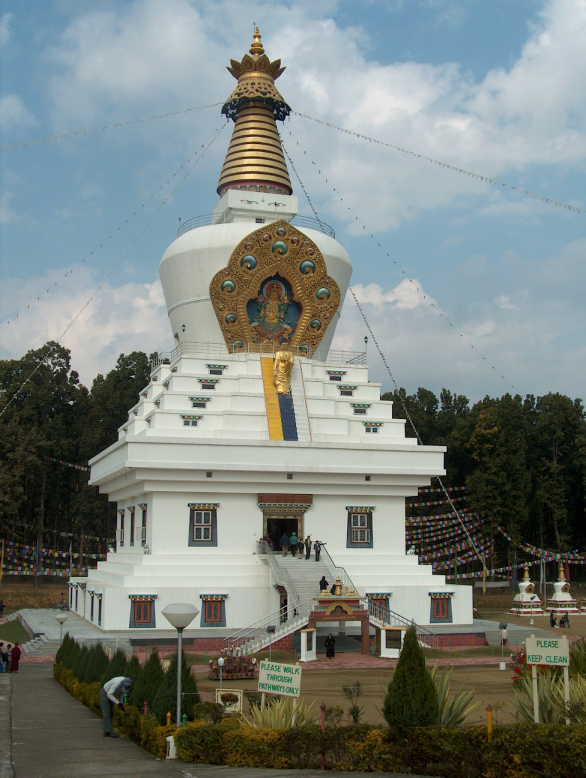
The stupa of the re-established Mindrolling Monastery, in Clement Town, Dehradun.

In 1965, Khochhen Rinpoche and small group of monks began the process of re-establishing Mindrolling monastery located near Clement Town, in Dehradun, Uttarakhand state, India. It now contains Ngagyur Nyingma College, one of the largest Buddhist institutes in India.

== Kyabje Khochhen Rinpoche ==
Khotrul Jurme Dogyud Gyatso Rinpoche, known also as Khochhen Rinpoche, was born in 1937 in Gonjo in Eastern Tibet. He was considered at an early age to be the reincarnation of Namdrol Sangpo Rinpoche of Khochhen Monastery by the 8th Mindrolling Khenchen. At Mindrolling in Tibet, Rinpoche studied and mastered Buddhist philosophy, Sutra and Tantra, calligraphy, rituals and so on from masters including Dzongsar Khyentse Chokyi Lodroe, Minling Chung Rinpoche and the 8th Minling Khenchen Rinpoche. Rinpoche was at Mindrolling for over ten years until the Communist invasion in 1959.

Following the invasion, Rinpoche, at the age of 22, escaped into exile in India as one of the member entourage of Mindrolling Trichen Rinpoche. Most of the members of this entourage consisted of monks from Khochhen monastery in Tibet. In 1965, Kyabje Paltrul Jampel Lodoe Rinpoche (Dzonang Rinpoche) and Khochhen Rinpoche selected land near Dehradun and built Mindrolling Monastery in India. Mindrolling Trichen Rinpoche was invited from Kalimpong.

Rinpoche established the Ngagyur Nyingma College or Institute of Advanced Buddhist Studies in 1991, which teaches a nine-year course including Sutra and Tantra to approximately one hundred monks. With the intention of spreading the Buddhadharma many tulkus and monks have graduated and received the title of khenpo from this college over the years.

Near Mindrolling Monastery, Rinpoche erected a 190 feet high Stupa of the Buddha's Descent from the God Realms, inaugurated in 2002, and dedicated to world peace.

In East India in Kalimpong, Darjeeling, state of West Bengal Rinpoche constructed a new monastery in the Mindrolling lineage, inaugurated on 1 March 2007, as well as a school for the village children and a must needed clinic.

In Delhi, Rinpoche built a new Mindrolling branch monastery, inaugurated in 2005 in which, as of 2017, 65 monks performed pujas.

In Taiwan Rinpoche founded several Mindrolling Dharma centres in Taipei, Changhua, Taichung City and Kaohsiung. The Puli Mindrolling temple is a huge area with few temples around built by the generous sponsor. The Tulkus, Khenpo and monks are actively carrying out special prayers and rituals at the temple.

Besides being the director of Mindrolling Monastery, Rinpoche has served as President of the Tibetan Community of Clement Town since.

Rinpoche started to establish another seat of Mindrolling in Sikkim known as Denjong Mindrolling, with a small temple and monk's rooms in use by few monks of Denjong Mindrolling. Besides the temple, Rinpoche at the age of 81 established a Zangdokpalri Temple in Sikkim. Zangdokpalri (copper coloured abode of Guru Rinpoche) is first time being established in the land of Guru Rinpoche. This temple is situated in the Tumlong, Phodong, North Sikkim.

Kyabje Rinpoche has for several decades been the General Secretary of the Annual Nyingma Monlam Chenmo International Foundation at Bodhgaya.

== Literature ==
- von Schroeder, Ulrich. 2001. Buddhist Sculptures in Tibet. Vol. One: India & Nepal; Vol. Two: Tibet & China. (Volume One: 655 pages with 766 illustrations; Volume Two: 675 pages with 987 illustrations). Hong Kong: Visual Dharma Publications, Ltd. ISBN 962-7049-07-7. sMin grol gling («mindroling») monastery; pp. 551, 1184; Pl. 319A; Li ma lha khang («lima lhakhang»); Pls. 48E–F, 84C, 102A, 139A–B, 146A–B, 193C–D, 224E, 233A, 279B, 281E–G, 305A, 352A; gTer gsar lha khang («tersar lhakhang»), p. 746; Fig. XII–14; Pls. 178, 281A–C; gTsug lag khang («tsuglagkhang»), pp. 365, 922, 972–985; Figs. IV–6, XV–11; Pls. 236–241.
