= Bobby Cash =

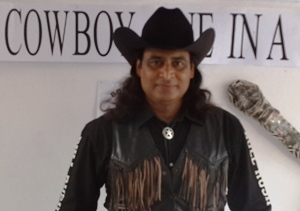
- Bobby Cash in 2014

Background information
- Born: Bal Kishore Das Loiwal; February 13, 1961 (age 65); Dehradun, Uttarakhand, India
- Origin: New Delhi, India
- Genres: Country, Pop, Gospel, Indian Pop
- Occupations: Guitarist, Singer, Songwriter, Composer
- Instruments: Vocals, Guitar
- Years active: 1995–present
- Labels: Magnasound, Archies Music, Universal Music (India), Gobsmacked Television, Gobsmacked Music
- Website: https://bobbycash.org/

Bobby Cash (born 13 February 1961) is an Indian country music singer, songwriter, guitaristand composer who lives in Clement Town, a suburb of Dehradun district in the state of Uttarakhand. He is praised by media for being India's first international country music artist who has charted singles in Australia, and also for being the only Indian country music artist to be featured in a documentary film, The Indian Cowboy...One in a Billion, aired on ABC Television (Australia) in January 2004 and on Discovery channel in India in June 2004. He is known as "The Indian Cowboy, one in a billion" by media.

== Early life ==
Cash grew up in Clement Town, Dehradun. An aunt of his, who lived in Nashville, Tennessee, regularly sent the latest country music releases of the time to Cash's mother. This was the music he grew up listening to and which he loved so much that he taught himself to play the guitar and sing those songs. Because of the dearth of other country music style genre musicians, he developed his own guitar style that encompassed playing bass lines, rhythm, finger-picking and lead to give a unique sound. While in Dehradun, Cash gave music lessonsand occasionally performed for the armed forces. It was only in 1995, after his father died, that he moved to New Delhi to pursue a career as a solo musical artist.

== Career ==
=== Early music career (1995–2002) ===
Cash's career began performing in New Delhi, at the popular hot spot, Rodeo. While in New Delhi, he briefly dabbled in Indian pop music. In 1996, he recorded his first Indian pop album Yeh Pyaar Hai under the Magnasound (India) label with Indian pop director and producer, Jawahar Wattal. This was followed by a guitar instrumental the same year called Film Hits on Guitar In 1998, Cash recorded Ruk Ja Baby with Archies Music. Indian pop, however, could not capture Cash's heart and he returned to his first love, country music.

=== 2003–present ===
A chance meeting with Australian film producer, Colin Bromley while in New Delhi, resulted in Cash being invited to the Tamworth Country Music Festival in New South Wales, Australia. Having heard him sing, and being impressed by his musicianship, Bromley, producer/director of Sydney-based television production house, Gobsmacked and Gerry O'Leary, Gobsmacked's head of production, decided to make a film on Cash performing in the festival and see what happened there. Thus, in January 2003, Cash went to perform in the Tamworth Country Music Festival. An unknown, Cash struck a chord with the country music lovers there and grabbed the attention of the media. A local wealthy farmer, Roy Eykamp, came forward and offered to finance Cash's debut country music album What happened at the festival, and Cash rising from being an unknown to celebrity status became the subject of Bromley's documentary film, The Indian Cowboy...One in a Billion.

Cash recorded his debut album, Cowboy at Heart, with some of the cream of the Australian music industry. Produced by Golden Guitar winner, Lawrie Minson, the album also featured duets with Smoky Dawson and Tania Kernaghan.

In June 2005, Cash's music was recognized in the United States by the Country Music Association, Nashville, Tennessee.

India is listed on the country music world map as one of the foreign territories outside the United States with a country music culture and Cash was invited as one of CMA's nominees for Global Artist of the Year Award given in recognition for furthering of country music in a territory other than the United States. While he did not win the Award, Cash's performance at The Stage on Broadway did lead to a standing ovation led by the then chief of CMA, Ed Benson.

The same year, heading back to Australia, he proceeded to record his second album, Phoenix to El Paso, a collection of cover versions of crowd favorites. In 2006, he recorded a third album, State of My Heart. Both albums, Cowboy at Heart and State of My Heart had several tracks from them making it to the Top Ten Australian country music charts. In August 2014, his music single "Ashiyaan" was published by Songdew

Cash toured and played extensively in Australia for a number of years. As of 2014, he tours mostly in India playing and promoting country music.

In September 2026, it was announced that a new feature film titled The Indian Cowboy will be set and filmed in New South Wales. The movie follows Cash's career which took off after performing at the Tamworth Country Music Festival.

== Personal life ==
Cash lives with his wife Angelina and two children in Clement Town, Dehradun, India.

== Discography ==
=== Hindi pop albums (India) ===
- Yeh Pyaar Hai (Magnasound, 1996)
- Film Hits On Guitar (Magnasound, 1996)
- Ruk Ja Baby (Archies Music, 1998)

=== Country music albums (Australia) ===
- Cowboy at Heart (Gobsmacked Television, Australia, 2003 & Universal Music, India, 2004)
- Phoenix to El Paso (Gobsmacked Music, Australia, 2004)
- State of My Heart (Gobsmacked Music, 2006)

=== Singles ===
- "World Beneath My Wings" (from the album Light of Hope, Meat Pie Music (APRA), 2008)

=== Documentary film ===
- The Indian Cowboy...One in a Billion (2004)
- Rockumentary: Evolution of Indian Rock (2018)

=== Bollywood song ===
- "Budhau" (from the Hindi language feature film Gulabo Sitabo (2020, Rising Sun Productions, Amazon Prime Video)
