= Graphic Era Hill University =

Private university in Uttarakhand, India

- Other name: GEHU
- Motto: Transforming Dreams into Reality
- Type: Private University
- Established: 2011
- Founder: Kamal Ghanshala
- Accreditation: UGC, AIU, MHRD, AICTE
- President: Kamal Ghanshala
- Vice-Chancellor: Dr. Amit R. Bhatt
- Faculty: 70
- Administrative staff: 151
- Students: 5433
- Undergraduates: 4615
- Postgraduates: 222
- Doctoral students: 15
- Location: Dehradun, Uttrakhand, India; 30.267469°N 77.995927°E
- Campus: Dehradun, Bhimtal and Haldwani
- Colors: Red, white and black
- Website: gehu.ac.in

Graphic Era Hill University (GEHU) is an Indian private university. It has campuses located in Dehradun, Haldwani and Bhimtal in Uttarakhand, India. The university was established in 1956 as the extension of the Graphic Era Educational Society.

== History ==
Graphic Era Hill University was founded in 2011 in Dehradun by Dr. Kamal Ghanshala. The university is set up under Section 2(f) of the UGC Act, 1956 as the extension of the Graphic Era Educational Society, a nonprofit organization which is based in Dehradun. It is a private university. Ghanshala is its president.

== Campus ==
Graphic Era Hill University as three campuses located in Dehradun, Haldwani and Bhimtal in Uttarakhand, India.

== See also ==
- Graphic Era Deemed to be University
