= Naukuchiatal =

Freshwater lake in Uttarakhand, India

Naukuchiatal, Nainital
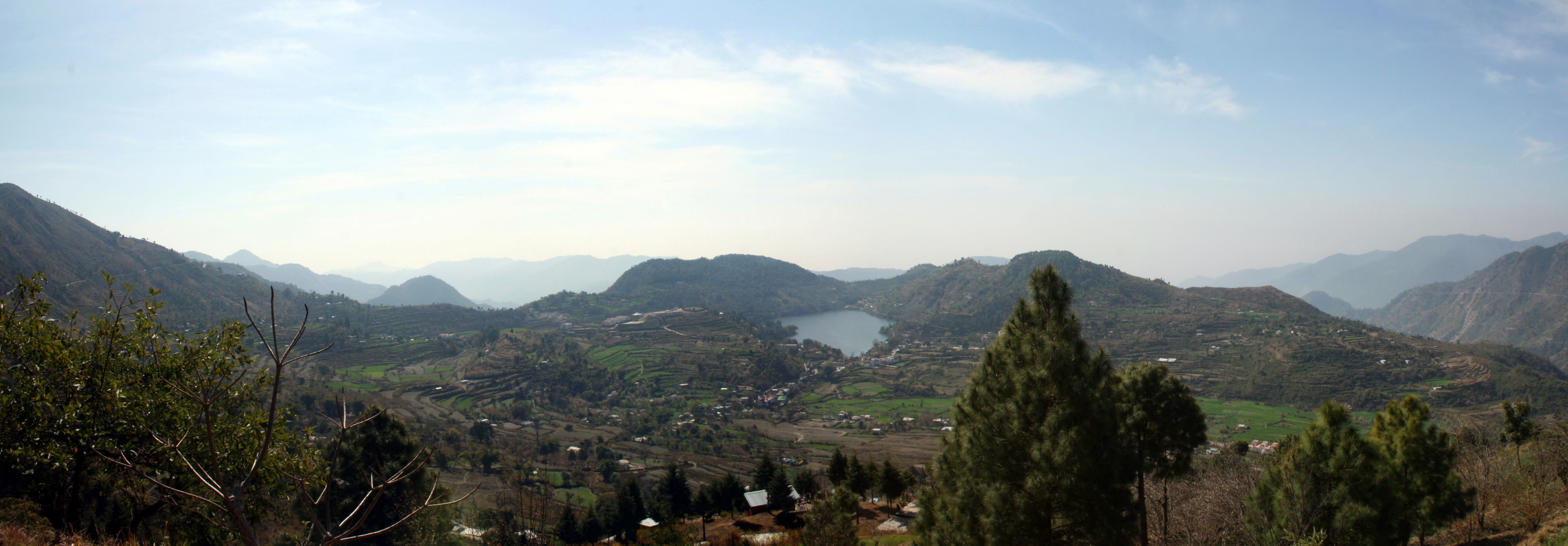
- A panoramic photo of the Naukuchiatal Lake in Nainital, Uttarakhand, India

- Location within Uttarakhand
- Interactive map of Naukuchiatal, Nainital
- Location: Naukuchiatal, near Nainital, Nainital district, Uttarakhand, India
- Coordinates: 29°19′N 79°35′E
- Type: Fresh Water Lake
- Basin countries: India
- Max. length: 983 m (3,225 ft)
- Max. width: 693 m (2,274 ft)
- Average depth: 40.3 m (132 ft)
- Surface elevation: 1,220 m (4,000 ft)

Naukuchiatal or "lake of nine corners" is a small hill station and lake near Nainital Town in Nainital district of Kumaon, Uttarakhand, India. Its chairman is Devendra Singh Chanotiya.

The lake is 175 feet deep and is situated at 1,220 metres (4,000 ft) above sea level. It is the deepest lake in the Nainital region. The length of the lake is 983 metres (3,225 ft), its breadth is 693 metres (2,274 ft) and it has a depth of 40.3 metres (132 ft). Naukuchiatal is also known for the 'escape festival' which happens once every year (in the month of May).

== Location ==
The lake is situated 4 km from Bhimtal and 26 km from Nainital. The nearest railway station is in Kathgodam.

== Mythology ==
It is believed that the lake was created after hard worship (Sanskrit "tap") of Brahmaji and a small temple dedicated to Brahmaji exists near the KMVN guesthouse. According to locals anyone performing a parikarma of the lake will be blessed by Brahmaji.

== Climate ==
The temperatures in summer range from 11 C to 26 C and in winter from -2 C to 14 C.

== Notable locations ==
=== Hanuman Temple ===
Hanuman Temple is situated on the main road to Naukuchiatal. It has a 52 foot tall statue of Lord Hanuman. The Temple has an artificial cave design on the lines of the famous Vaishno Devi Shrine. The temple premise is very clean, which helps connect with the spiritual world immediately upon arrival. The temple also houses Vaishno Devi temple, Shani Mandir, and Ram Darbar temples and a reflection and place to sit back and rest for the visitors.

=== Mukteshwar ===
Mukteshwar is a temple situated at a distance of 38 km from Naukuchiatal set at an elevation of 2,285 m above sea level. Mukteshwar is named after a 350-year-old temple called Mukteshwer Dham whose presiding deity is great Lord Shiva. The top of the mountain on which Mukteshwar Dham is stood offers views of the Himalayan range. Mukteshwar was developed by the British as a research and education institute by setting up Indian Veterinary Research Institute (IVRI) in 1893.

=== Sat Tal ('Seven Lakes') ===
Sat Tal is a cluster of mysteriously interconnected seven freshwater lakes (Purna Tal, Ram Tal, Sita tal, Laxman Tal, Nal Damyanti Tal, Sukh Tal and Garud Tal) situated 19 km away from Naukuchia Tal. Sat Tal is set at an altitude of 1,370 m above sea level. The group of lakes is set amidst dense forests of oak and pine trees. These lakes are a notable home for migratory birds as they stay for some time here during their migration.

=== Nainital ===
The busiest hill station in the Kumaon region of Uttarakhand state. It is situated at a distance of 33 km from Naukuchia Tal at an elevation of 1,938 m above sea level. Nainital is named after an eye shaped lake set amidst the mountains with thick alpine trees.

=== Almora ===
Almora is known for its panoramic view of the Himalayas, cultural heritage, wildlife, handicrafts and cuisine. It is located at a height of 5,400 ft above sea level and is spread across a 5 km ridge atop Kashaya Hill. It is surrounded by Pithorgarh to the east, Garhwal to the west, Bageshwar to the north and Nainital to the south. The landscape of Almora attracts hundreds of tourists each year. It is situated 72 km from Naukuchiatal.

=== Ranikhet ===
Ranikhet is situated 7 3 km from Naukuchiatal at an altitude of 1,869 m above sea level. Ranikhet is a hill station in Almora District of Uttarakhand state and is maintained by Ranikhet Cantonment Board. Ranikhet is also the home for the Kumaon and Naga regiments of the Indian Army.

=== Bhim Tal ===
Bhim Tal is situated at a distance of 5 km from Naukuchia Tal at an altitude of 1,375 m above sea level. The main attraction in Bhimtal is the Bhimtal Lake which has a small island at its centre. Bhimtal is an ancient place named after the legendary Bhima of Mahabharata when Bhima visited during the exile period of Pandavas.

=== Haldwani ===
Haldwani is situated in the Nainital district of Kumaon region of Uttarakhand state at an average elevation of 425 m above sea level. The hills of the Kumaon region commence from Haldwani and the temperature decreases as climbers ascend. Since the beginning Haldwani has been a trading hub of Kumaon.

== See also ==
- Lakes of Kumaon hills
