= Economy of Uttar Pradesh =

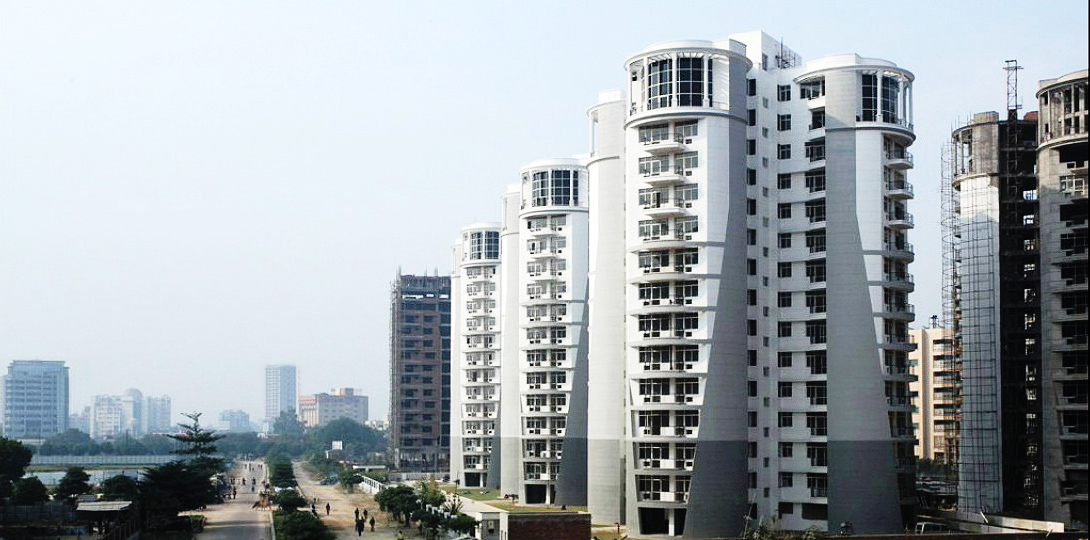
- Skylines in Lucknow
- Currency: Indian Rupee (INR, ₹)
- Fiscal year: 1 April - 31 March
- Country group: Developing/Emerging; Lower income economy

Statistics
- Population: ▲246,270,000 (2025)
- GDP: ▲₹39.8 lakh crore (US$430 billion) (nominal; 2026-27) ▲$1.96 trillion (PPP; 2026-27 est.)
- GDP rank: 3rd
- GDP growth: ▲28% (2026-27 est.)
- GDP per capita: ▲₹158,000 (US$1,700) (nominal; 2026-27) ▲$7650 (PPP; 2026-27 est.)
- GDP by sector: Agriculture 25.8% Industries 27.2% Services 47.0%, (2024-25)
- Population below national poverty line: ▼8.20% in poverty (2025-26)
- Human Development Index: ▲0.693 medium (2023, 32nd)
- Labour force by occupation: Agriculture 59.3% Industries 10.5% Services 30.2%, (2019)
- Unemployment: ▼2.9% (June 2022)

External
- Exports: ▲$19.05 billion (FY 2024-25)
- Export goods: Electronics; Garment; Automotive; Leather; Livestock; Farming; Fishing

Public finance
- Government debt: ▲₹9.19 lakh crore (US$98 billion); ▼23% of GDSP (2026)
- Budget balance: ▲₹1.18 lakh crore (US$13 billion) 3% of GSDP (2026–27 est.)
- Revenue: ₹7.32 lakh crore (US$78 billion) (2026–27 est.)
- Spending: ₹8.50 lakh crore (US$91 billion) (2026–27 est.)
- All values, unless otherwise stated, are in US dollars.

Uttar Pradesh has the 3rd largest economy among Indian states and is also the most populous, supporting a population of nearly 250 million. It is third-largest state economy in India, with ₹39.8 trillion (US$430 billion) in 2026-27.

Uttar Pradesh is the largest producer of food grains in India and accounted for about 20% share in the country's total food grain output in 2024-25. Food grain production in the state stood at about 72,512 thousand tonnes in 2024-25. Major food grains produced in the state include rice, wheat, maize, millet (bajra), gram, peas, dairy products and lentils.

Uttar Pradesh is a favoured tourist destination in India with Varanasi, considered to be one of the oldest living city of the world, a holy place for devotees of Lord Shiva and Taj Mahal, one of the eight Wonders of the World, is also located here in Agra. In 2022, domestic tourist arrivals in the state stood at 317.91 million. Varanasi, Agra, Ayodhya, Mathura and Prayagraj are among the most visited cities. The 2025 Prayag Maha Kumbh Mela attracted more than 550 million devotees and was estimated to generate ₹3.50 lakh crore in revenue.

Cities such as Lucknow, Noida, Meerut, Ghaziabad, Kanpur, Agra, Varanasi Gorakhpur and Prayagraj are leading economic centres in the state. The growth of Noida and Greater Noida has come due to Yamuna Expressway, it has become the largest electronic manufacturing hub in India, responsible for over 60% of India's mobile production. Now the government is pushing to create Meerut as the next Industrial hub and the Ganga Expressway is expected to fuel this.

== Agriculture, livestock and fishing ==
Uttar Pradesh is a major contributor to the national food grain stock. In FY 2020–21, the state produced 5.81 crores (58.10 million) tonnes of food grain, 18.68% of the country's total production. This is partly due to the fertile regions of the Indo-Gangetic plain and also the well-developed irrigation facilities, such as canals and tube wells. It has been the foremost producer of food grains in India since the 1950s, due to high-yielding varieties of seed, greater availability of fertilisers, and increased use of irrigation.

Western Uttar Pradesh is more advanced in terms of agriculture than the other regions in the state. The majority of the state's population depends upon farming activities. Wheat, rice, pulses, oilseeds, and potatoes are major agricultural products. Sugarcane is the most important cash crop throughout the state. Uttar Pradesh is one of the most important states in India as far as horticulture is concerned. Mangoes are extensively grown in the state.

== Industry ==
Uttar Pradesh has a robust industrial infrastructure, including 15 industrial areas, 12 specialised parks, four growth centres and industrial infrastructure development centres (IIDC). As of January 2019, Uttar Pradesh had 21 notified, 12 operational SEZs and 24 formally approved SEZs.

The Noida-Greater Noida-Yamuna Expressway corridor has become a major destination for many IT/ITES and electronic manufacturing companies. This corridor alone has contributed about 40 percent to the manufacturing of mobiles in the country and about 55 percent of the country's mobile phone component production.

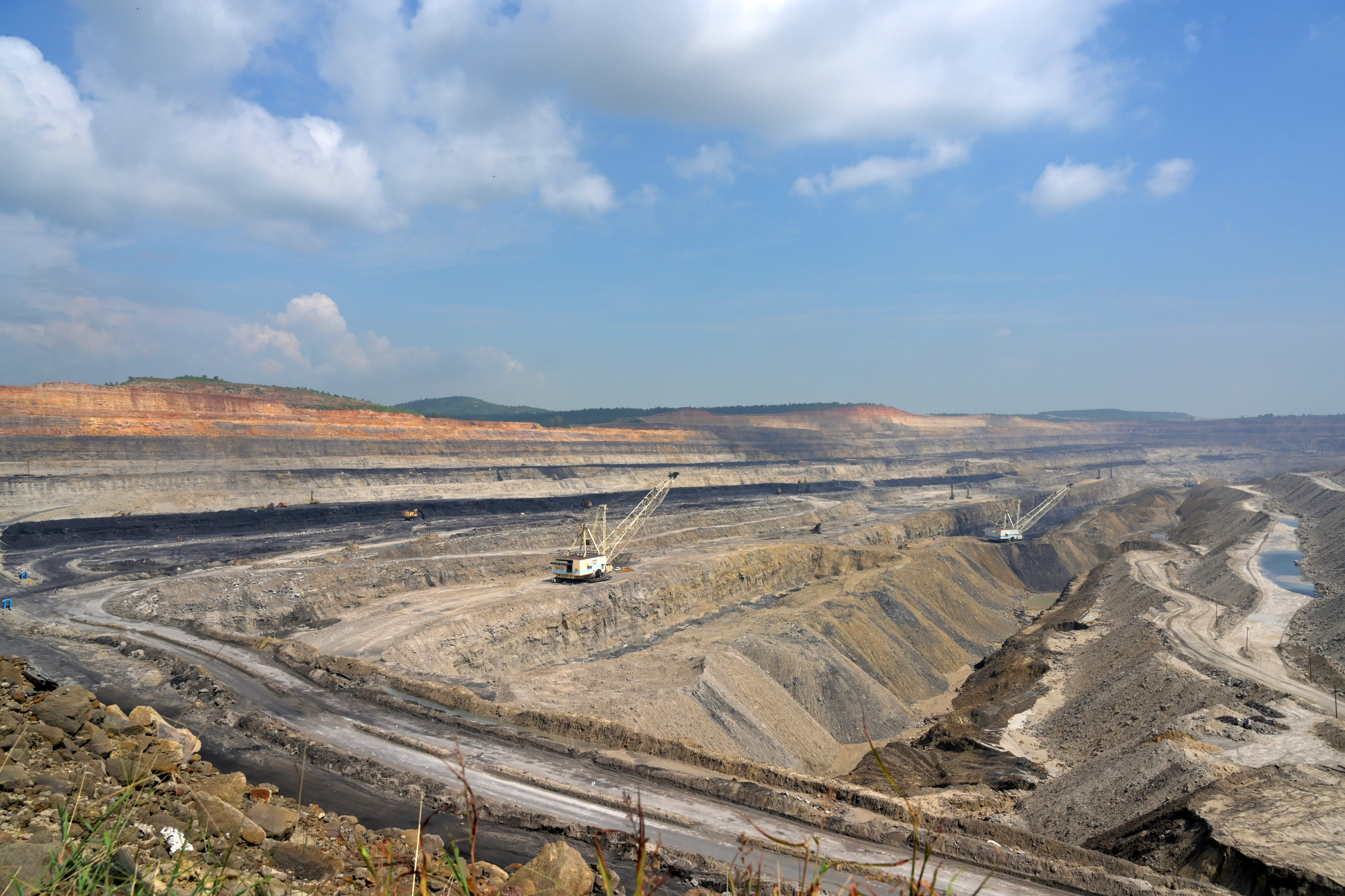
Dudhichua Coal Mine, Singrauli

There are a huge quantity of mineral resources found in the Vindhya mountain range of Uttar Pradesh. Uttar Pradesh has many resources like limestone, Magnesite, Copper, Gypsum. There are several cement plants in Mirzapur in the Vindhya region, a bauxite-based aluminium plant in the Banda region, and the Sonbhadra region. Coal deposits are found in the Singrauli region.

Main Industries of Uttar Pradesh

- Agriculture
- Livestock
- Farming
- Fishing
- Pottery
- Gold market
- Brass
- IT
- Construction
- Infrastructure
- IT Consulting
- Electronics
- Garment
- Textile
- Advertising
- Automotive
- Leather and others

Cottage industries, such as handloom and handicrafts, have traditionally provided livelihood to a large number of people in the state. These industries include:

- Meerut is a leading logistics hub for good, transportation, and also has India's biggest sports and good production. Meerut also has tyre, textile, transformer, sugar, distillery, chemical, engineering, paper, publishing, and other industries.
- Varanasi is world-famous for handloom-woven, embroidered textiles, called "Banarasi Saree"; the main products are Zari-embroidery and brocade-work on silk sarees. Varanasi along with neighboring town of Ramnagar is also home to many Agricultural and food product industries.
- Lucknow is a centre of 'Chikan' embroidery, renowned for its grace and delicacy, a skill more than 200 years old. Uttar Pradesh produces about 15% of the total fabric production of the country, employs about 30% of the total workforce of artisans in India.
- The state has two major production centres of leather and leather products, with over 11,500 units; Agra and Kanpur are the key centres. About 200 tanneries are located in Kanpur.
- Shahjahanpur is a distinguished industrial district. It is famous for its carpet works. Further, the city boasts of major plant and machinery infrastructure with the presence of Kribhco fertilizer plant, Reliance Rosa Thermal Power Plant, Indane bottling plant, Ordinance clothing factory, K R Papermill and several other sugar and paper mills.
- Moradabad is renowned for brass work and has carved a niche for itself in the handicraft industry throughout the world. Lately, other products that are produced here like iron sheet metal wares, aluminium artworks, woodworks, and glass wares have become popular with numerous foreign buyers, and are therefore being exported in large quantities. On average, Moradabad exports goods worth ₹3000–4000 crore each year, which constitutes 40% of total exports from India under this category.
- Bhadohi district is biggest carpet manufacturing centre in India. It is known for its hand-knotted carpet. The Mirzapur-Bhadohi region is the largest handmade carpet weaving cluster, engaging around 3.2 million people in the industry. Bhadohi employs 22 lakh rural artisans.
- Dibiyapur is a notable industrial town in the Kanpur–Agra region. The town is well equipped with industries. Many small scale industries also operate in the town. Agriculture being the most popular occupation in the rural sides of the town, shops, and organised retail outlets also serve as "money raisers in the town".

=== Large-scale industries ===
Dibiyapur is a notable industrial town of Auraiya district which has installations of India's leading public sector enterprises viz.

Cycle power plant of NTPC. Pata Petrochemical plant Gas compressor station of GAIL (previously known as Gas Authority of India Limited).

=== Small-scale industries ===
The Rice-mills and Dal-mills are working well. Other than these mills some steel furniture and cement products small scale industries are there in town located at different places. The raw material for these small-scale industries is imported from Agra and Kanpur. Mainly, the rice, pulses and desi ghee is transported at large scale to the other districts and states. In the Dibiyapur town itself the wooden furniture work is on large scale and due to its cost and quality factor, the furniture has made a good place in the market of nearby districts.

- Meerut is one of the biggest gold markets in Asia. It is one of the largest exporters of sports-related items and musical instruments in the country.
- Bulandshahr is renowned for Khurja Pottery worldwide. There are nearly 23 export-oriented units and they are exported to foreign countries such as United Kingdom, United States, Australia, New Zealand, United Arab Emirates, and others. The Sikandrabad industrial area, developed by UPSIDC, has a large number of national and multinational companies working here successfully.
- Prayagraj city is home to glass and wire-based industry. The main industrial areas of Prayagraj are Naini and Phulpur, where several public and private sector companies have offices and factories. Bharat Petroleum Corporation Limited, India's largest oil company (which is state-owned), is constructing a 7 million MTPA (70 lakh tonnes per annum) capacity refinery in Lohgara with an investment estimated at ₹6,200 crore. Allahabad Bank, which began operations in 1865, Bharat Pumps & Compressors and A. H. Wheeler and Company have their headquarters in the city. Major companies in the city are Reliance Industries, ITI Limited, BPCL, Dey's Medical, Food Corporation of India, Raymond Synthetics, Triveni Sheet Glass, Triveni Electroplast, EMC Power Ltd, Steel Authority of India, HCL Technologies, Indian Farmers Fertiliser Cooperative (IFFCO), Vibgyor Laboratories, Geep Industries, Hindustan Cable, Indian Oil Corporation Ltd, Baidyanath Ayurved,Mudra International Ltd - Beverages , Hindustan Laboratories.

== Minerals and heavy industries ==
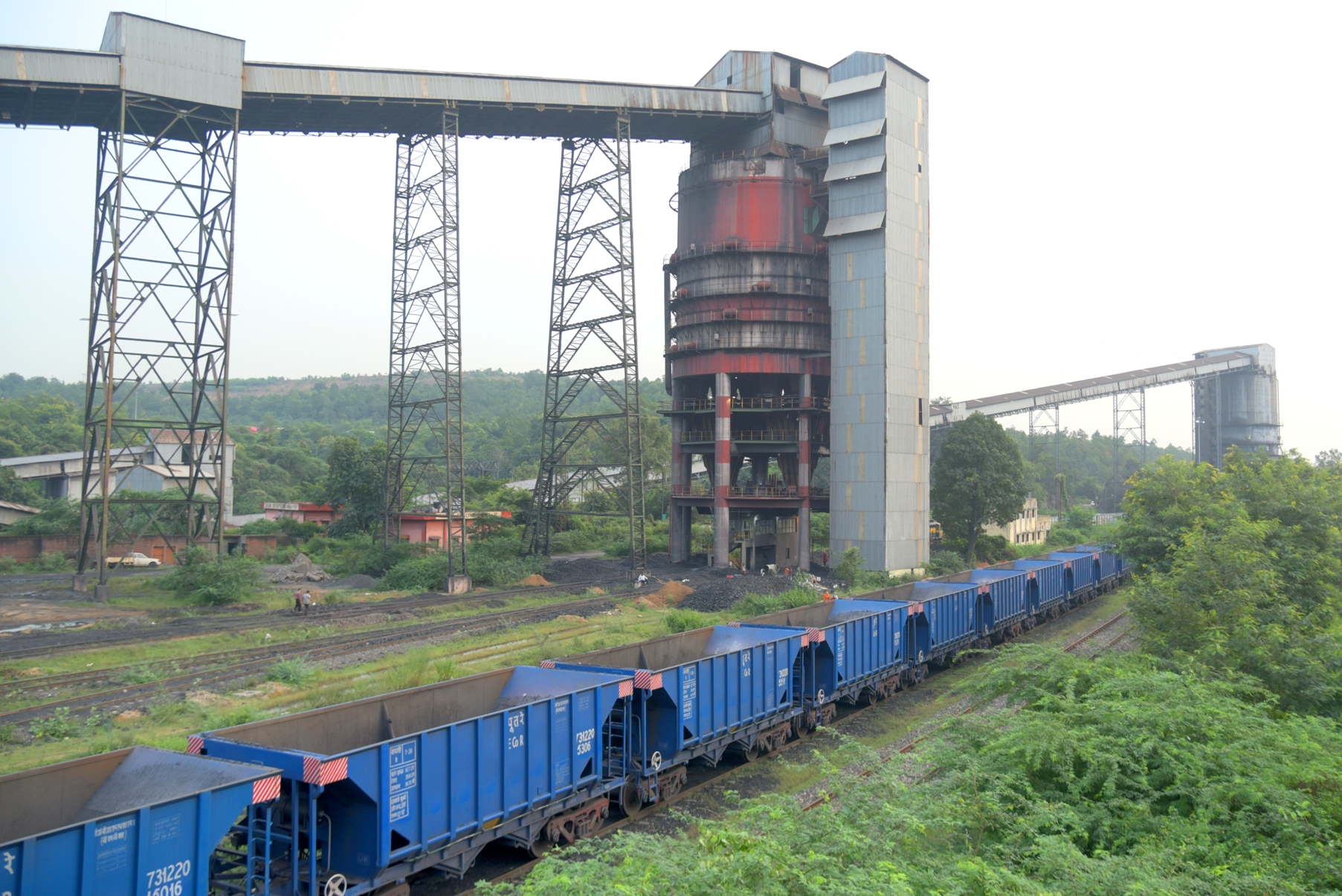
Dudhichua Coal Mine, Singrauli

Meerut, Ghaziabad, Gautam Buddh Nagar, Kanpur, Sonbhadra, Mirzapur, and Balrampur are the most industrious areas in the state.

Mathura Refinery situated in Mathura is the only oil refinery in Uttar Pradesh, and is the 6th largest oil refinery in India.

== Handloom and handicrafts ==
Handlooms and handicrafts are a very important source of income in Uttar Pradesh. There are thousands of power looms and handlooms in the state, most of which are situated in eastern UP. Many people depend on it for their livelihood. Main centres in eastern Uttar Pradesh include Tanda, Varanasi, Azamgarh, Bhadohi, Mirzapur, Mau and Mau Aima (Prayagraj). In Western Uttar Pradesh some of the important centres are Meerut, Etawah, Etah and Kasganj. In Eastern UP, Tanda is a small town with a population of approximately 1,50,000 people with over 1,00,000 power looms. The main products include Lungis, Gamchas, Shawls, Rumaal, and garment clothes.

=== One District One Product scheme ===
One District One Product is a State Government scheme to encourage local handicrafts and specialized product from each district by helping workers financially. By providing them machineries and tools government helps small local workers.

== Services ==
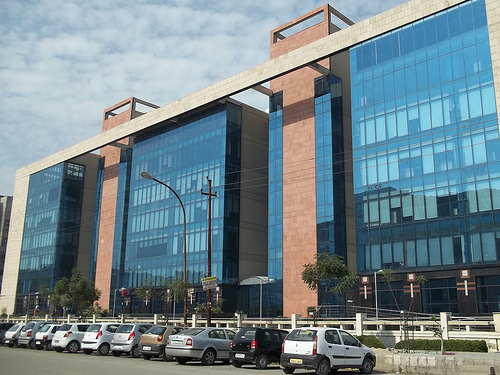
IT Park, Noida, Uttar Pradesh

Uttar Pradesh is the 'IT-Hub' of northern India, with a share of software exports next to that of Karnataka. IT enterprises are limited to particular areas, such as Noida, Greater Noida and Ghaziabad, which lie in the National Capital Region (NCR), commercial capital Kanpur and in the state capital Lucknow.

In recent years, Noida has emerged as a major center for software and mobile app development, attracting global companies such as Microsoft, Arm Holdings, HCL, Samsung, and Barclays. These firms play a vital role in boosting the city's economy through software development and by exporting services that generate foreign exchange. Noida is also famous for TV News broadcasters. Almost all News channels such as ABP News, Zee News and Mahua News are located in Film City.

== Infrastructure ==
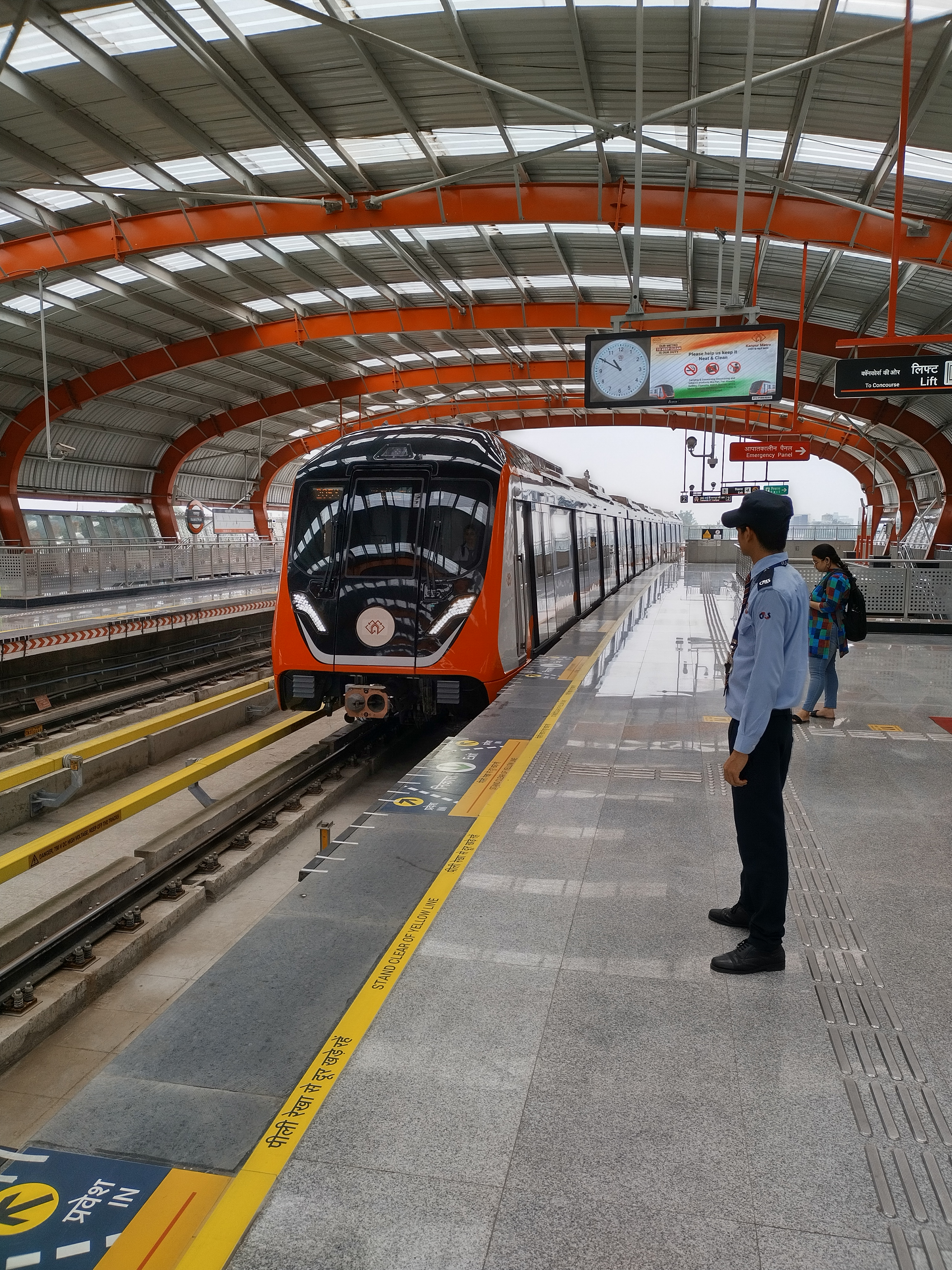
Kanpur Metro

The state government has undertaken several infrastructure projects since the 2010s. In 2013, the Government of India declared the construction of Chaudhary Charan Singh International Airport in Lucknow and Lal Bahadur Shastri Airport in Varanasi, and both became operational in 2016.

Lucknow Metro and Kanpur Metro became operational in September 2017 and December 2021 respectively with Kanpur Metro being the fastest built metro network in India. The Uttar Pradesh State Road Transport Corporation bus service is one of the largest in the country with more than 10,000 buses. UPSRTC ALSO introduced Volvo, Scania, and Janrath ac buses service across the state.

The length of the national highway and railway track is highest in India. A new international airport had been proposed in Gautambudh Nagar is under construction and supposed to start by 2024. Kushinagar International Airport become operational in 2021.

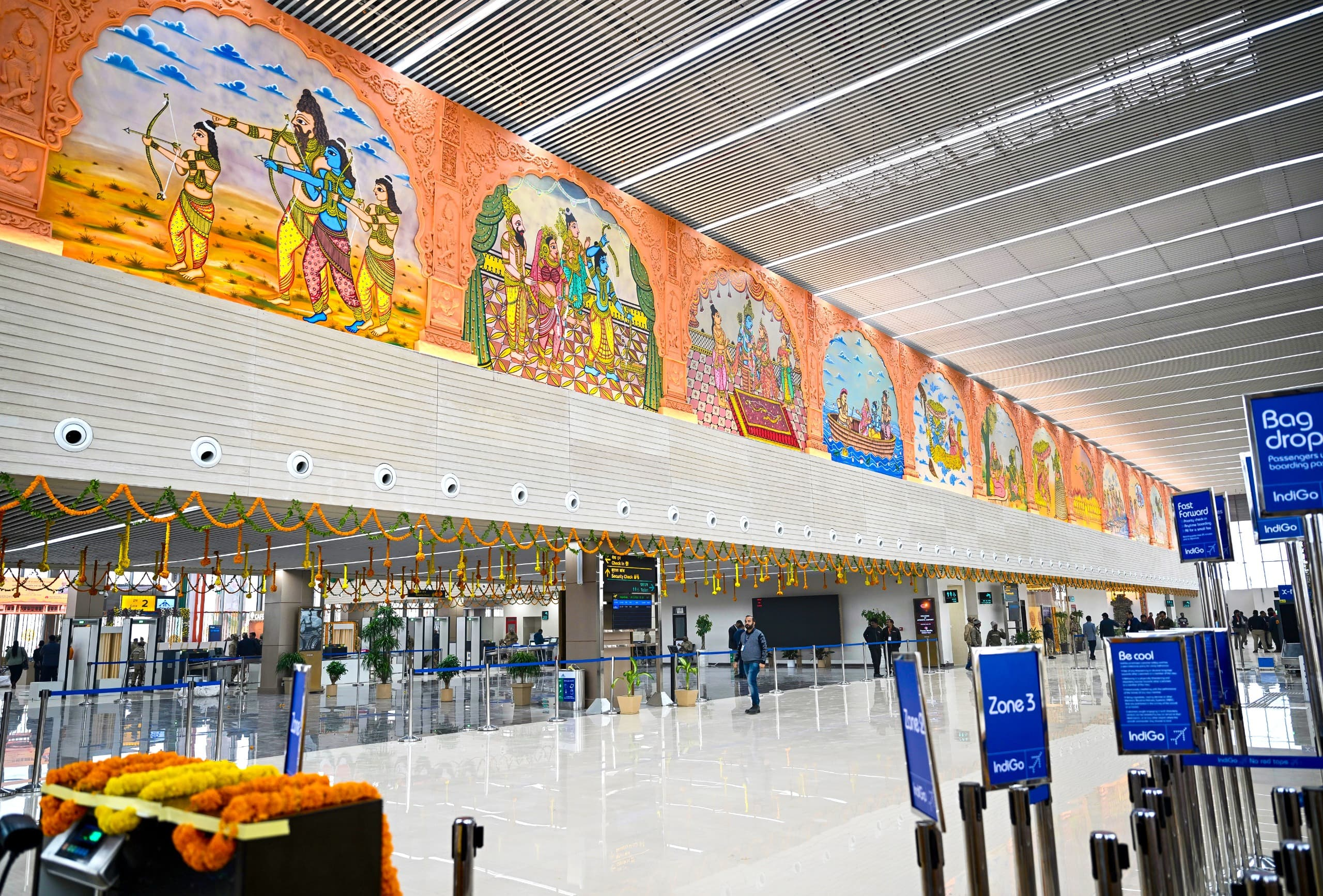
Ayodhya International Airport

Ayodhya airport was inaugurated in December 2023. Uttar Pradesh has the most national highways and the state's 8th airport Bareilly Airport began operation in March 2021, with the first route between Bareilly and Delhi, the flight which is operated by Indigo takes an hour. The Yamuna Expressway, which is between New Delhi to Agra, is one of the best highways in the country. In 2015, the state government started another expressway project between Agra to Lucknow that has reduced the journey time; it was inaugurated on 21 November 2016.

=== RRTS & Freight Corridors ===
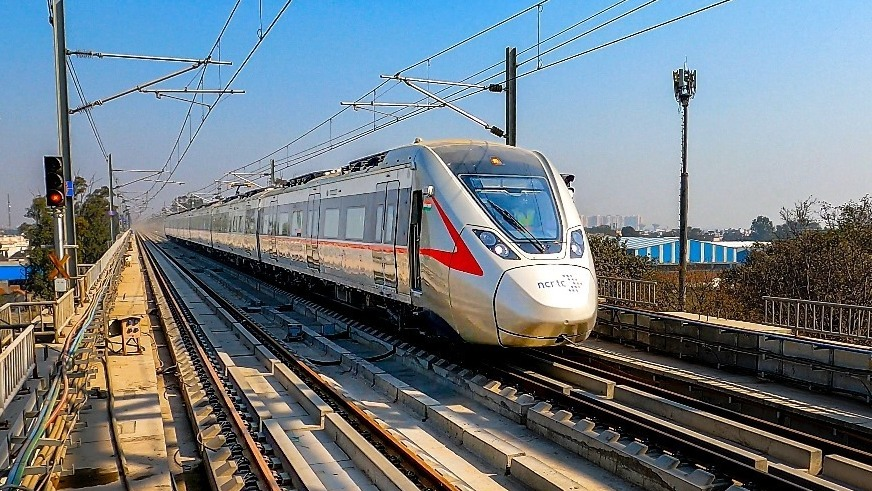
Namo Bharat RRTS

India's first inter city metro, Delhi Meerut RRTS is also partially operational. Delhi – Meerut RRTS (RAPIDX) is an 82.15 km under-construction semi-high speed rail line with 22 stations connecting Delhi – Meerut through a series of tunnels and elevated viaducts as part of Delhi's Regional Rapid Transit System.

Uttar Pradesh is also set to get operational Eastern and Western dedicated freight corridors. The primary objective of the National Rail Plan is to increase the freight share of railways from 28 per cent to 44 per cent by the year 2051. Uttar Pradesh will have big logistic hubs at Meerut and Khurja.

=== Ganga Expressway ===
Ganga Expressway, from prayagraj to meerut is an under-construction, 594 km (369 mi) long, 6-lane (expandable to 8) wide greenfield expressway in the state. Pharma parks, textile parks will be developed around Ganga Expressway. Plans are underway to build large industrial corridors at the beginning and end of the expressway. Due to its proximity to the expressway, many investors are expected to set up industries here.

The land around the departure points of Meerut, from where the expressway is to begin, will be developed for industries.

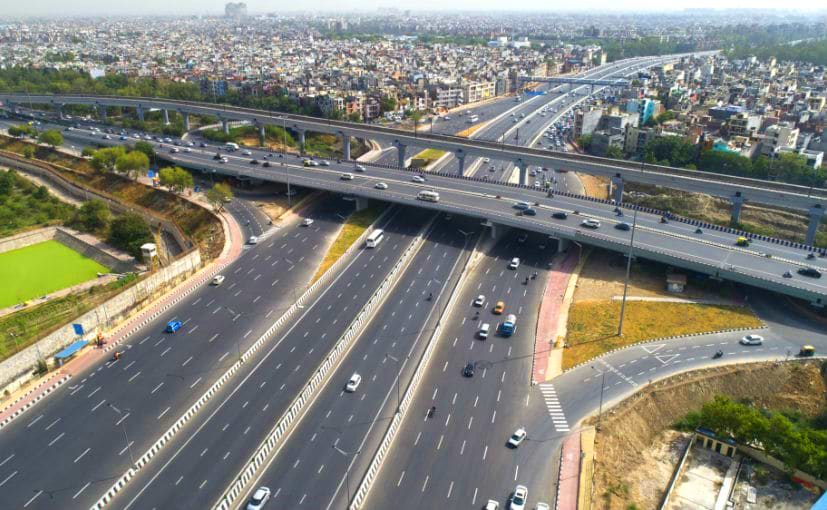
Delhi Meerut Expressway

On 31 December 2015, Prime Minister Narendra Modi announced an expressway between New Delhi and Meerut, which will cost ₹7,500 crore. It will reduce the journey time to one hour. Delhi-Meerut expressway was opened for public use in April 2021. In 2018 four new expressways - Purvanchal expressway, Bundelkhand expressway, Kanpur-Lucknow expressway, Gorakhpur Link expressway, Ganga expressway, Ballia link expressway are being constructed. Purvanchal expressway has been opened for public use in February 2022, while the Bundelkhand expressway has started operating in July 2022.

=== Noida International Airport ===
India's largest airport is also expected to open in Jewar, Uttar Pradesh.

== GSDP Of Uttar Pradesh ==
Year	GSDP Of U.P (Current Prices)
2011-12	▲₹ 7.24 Lakh crore
2012-13	▲₹ 8.22 Lakh crore
2013-14	▲₹ 9.40 Lakh crore
2014-15	▲₹ 10.12 Lakh crore
2015-16	▲₹ 11.38 Lakh crore
2016-17	▲₹ 12.89 Lakh crore
2017-18	▲₹ 14.40 Lakh crore
2018-19	▲₹ 15.82 Lakh crore
2019-20	▲₹ 17.00 Lakh crore
2020-21	▼₹ 16.45 Lakh crore
2021-22	▲₹ 19.76 Lakh crore
2022-23	▲₹ 22.58 Lakh crore
2023-24	▲₹ 25.48 Lakh crore
2024-25	▲₹ 30.25 Lakh crore
2025-26	▲₹ 36.00 Lakh crore
2026-27	▲₹ 39.80 Lakh crore

== Economic distribution ==
There is visible income disparity in Uttar Pradesh. Western Uttar Pradesh contributes more than 50% of revenues to the state government, with per capita incomes of the districts in the region visibly higher compared with the East.

This is also due to more fertile soil, suitable infrastructure for industries, better transportation and logistic channels like expressways and dedicated freight corridors and also due to its proximity to national capital Delhi.

Cities like Noida which is an IT hub in the state, Meerut and Agra are leading districts in the state with highest per capita income.

Per Capita Income of Top 10 Districts of Uttar Pradesh
District	Per Capita Income (2019–20)
Noida	₹612,617
Meerut	₹127,306
Agra	₹106,354
Ghaziabad	₹101,878
Hamirpur	₹100,673
Amroha	₹97,175
Lucknow	₹95,990
Hapur	₹91,764
Kanpur	₹86,709
Mahoba	₹83,593
Prayagraj	₹65,704

While west UP accounts for 71.71% of state GDP, the lagging Bundelkhand accounts for just 5.22%, though it has risen from 4.95% bringing some solace to the government.

== Tourism ==
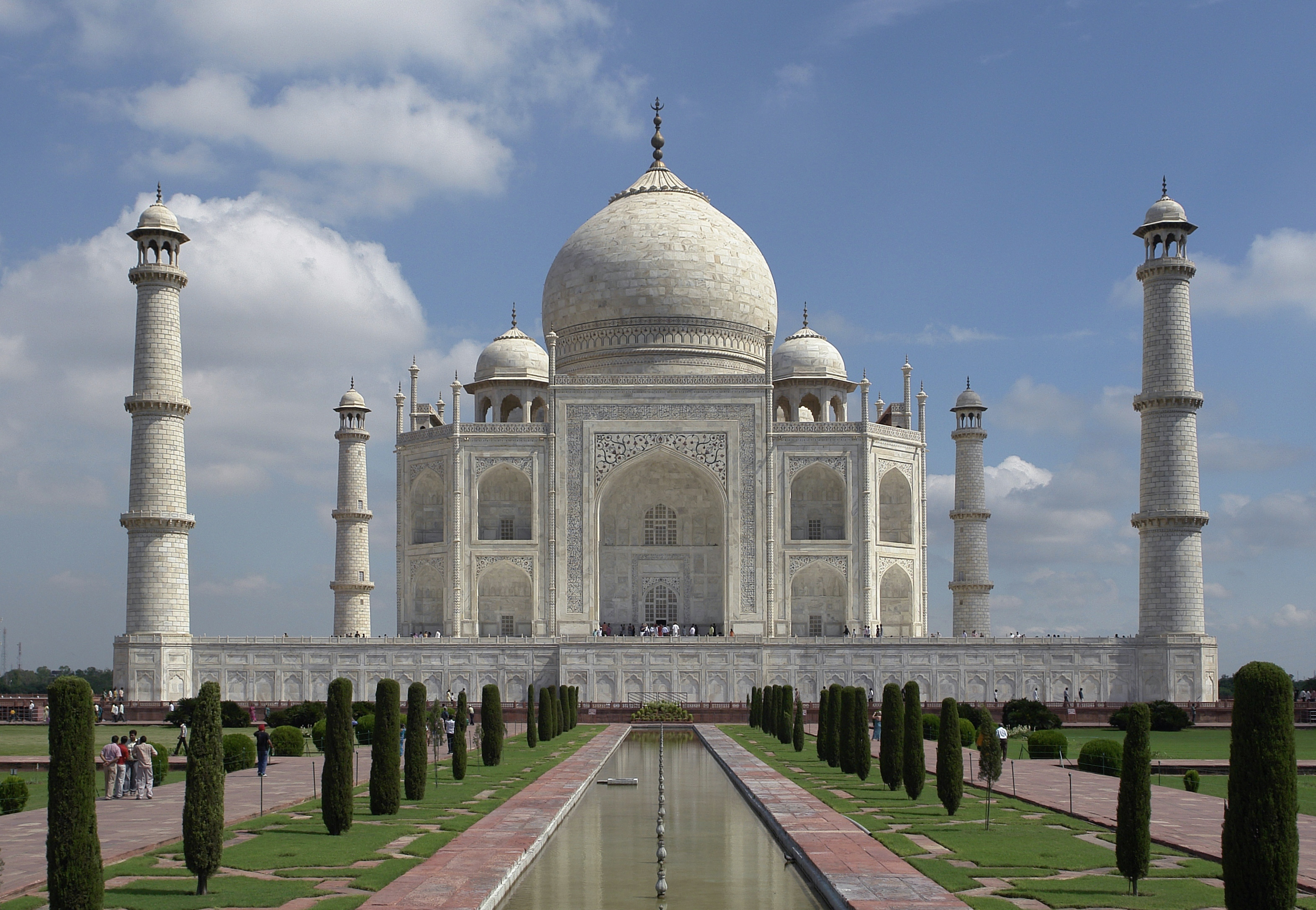
Taj Mahal, Agra

Among all the monuments in India, the Taj Mahal, Agra (5.65 million) was the most visited monument in 2018-19 for domestic visitors. In respect of foreign visitors too Taj Mahal (10.87 million) was the most visited monument.

Just an hour's drive from Agra, on the banks of the river Yamuna, is situated the birthplace of Lord Krishna, Mathura. The entire land is dotted with Hindu temples, dedicated to various aspects of his life. Gokul, Barsana and Govardhan are the other township associated with the legend of Lord Krishna. Gokul is the hideout where Lord Krishna was secretly brought up- away from the eyes of his maternal uncle Kansa. His consort Goddess Radha belonged to Barsana, where the unique Holi festival Latthamar Holi is celebrated.

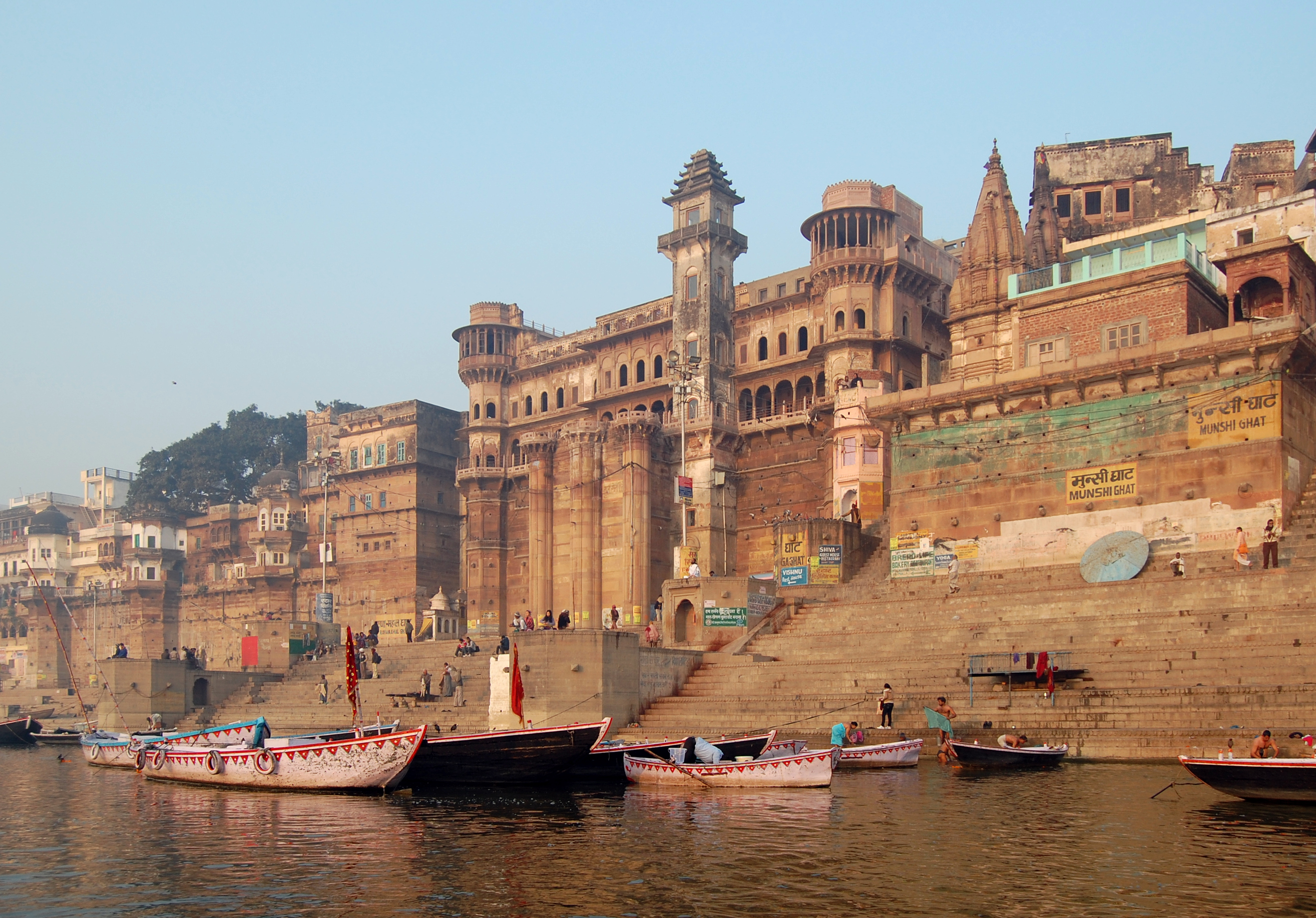
Munshi Ghat, Varanasi

Varanasi, in eastern Uttar Pradesh is among the oldest living cities in the world and its antiquity finds place in ancient scriptures. Located along the banks of Ganga it is a sacred place for all Hindus, Sikhs, Jains and Buddhists.

Percentage share of Top 10 States/UT in Domestic Tourist Visits In 2022.
1. Uttar Pradesh (18.4%)
2. Tamil Nadu (12.6%)
3. Andhra Pradesh (11.1%)
4. Karnataka (10.5%)
5. Maharashtra (6.40%)
6. Rajasthan (6.30%)
7. Other (34.7%)

Lucknow, the capital of Uttar Pradesh, is a unique mix of the ancient and the modern. It is home to monuments depicting a blend of ancient, colonial and oriental architecture.

Kushinagar is one of the principal centres of the Buddhist pilgrimage, is the place where Lord Buddha left his corporal self and attained Mahaparinirvana. It attracts thousands of visitors from all over the world every year. In the uniquely designed Mahaparinirvana temple is a huge statue of the reclining Buddha, excavated in 1876. The monuments here are clustered in three groups – the Nirvana site, the central Stupa and the surrounding monasteries, Mathakuar Kot and Ramabhar Stupa.

Located on the east bank of River Saryu in central Uttar Pradesh, Ayodhya is brimming with the remnants of a bygone era. The famous epics, Ramayana and Shri Ramcharitmanas exhibit the splendor of Ayodhya. Many eminent kings such as Ikshvaku, Prithu, Mandhata, Harishchandra, Sagar, Bhagirath, Raghu, Dileep, Dashrath and Lord Rama ruled the capital city of Kosala. It was during their reign, that the grandeur of the kingdom reached its pinnacle and epitomized Ram Rajya. An episode of Ramayana, a page of ancient history and a cluster of tourist attractions, this town has been a major centre for pilgrims, historians, archaeologists and students alike.

== Education ==
The literacy rate of Uttar Pradesh is 74% with male literacy rate at 82% and female literacy rate at 66.1%.

== Poverty ==
According to NITI Aayog's Multidimensional Poverty Index (MPI) based on NFHS-5, 22.93% population of Uttar Pradesh is classified as poor.

== See also ==
- Economy of India
- Economy of Madhya Pradesh
- Economy of Bihar
- Economy of Uttarakhand
