= Hanuman Ansh (soundtrack) =

2026 film soundtrack album

Soundtrack album by Sadhu Sushil Tiwari, Rishi Pathak, Vishal Chaturvedi, Dhirendra Mulkawar
- Released: 11 July 2026
- Recorded: 2026
- Genre: Feature film soundtrack
- Length: 36:42
- Language: Hindi
- Label: Times Music

Hanuman Ansh is the soundtrack album to the 2026 biographical film of the same name directed by Vishal Chaturvedi based on the life of Neem Karoli Baba. The soundtrack accompanying devotional numbers, featured songs composed by Sadhu Sushil Tiwari, Rishi Pathak, Chaturvedi and Dhirendra Mulkawar and lyrics were written by Tiwari, Guru Goraksh Nath, Shreyas Dharmadhikari, Shantanu Sudame, Pathak and Chaturvedi. The album was released through Times Music on 11 July 2026.

== Background ==
The soundtrack to Hanuman Ansh accompanied several devotional tracks and folk numbers. Sadhu Sushil Tiwari, Rishi Pathak, Vishal Chaturvedi, Dhirendra Mulkawar composed the songs while three of them had also wrote the lyrics with Guru Goraksh Nath, Shreyas Dharmadhikari and Shantanu Sudame. All of the musicians had reduced their fees and also worked on the project for free, without renumeration as mostly they were connected to the spirituality and purely because of friendship with fellow musicians.

Dharmadhikari associated with Chaturvedi when he attended a concert at an ISKCON Temple in Pune and had known him for long time having worked on a short film Diwali. When Chaturvedi called Dharmadhikari to his office regarding the film, he said that he had completed the shoot but for a sequence with Neem Karoli Baba wanting to carve an Hanuman idol in the village, he wanted a song to fit the situation. Dharmadhikari recalled that he had written a song "Jai Hanuman" for the Hanuman temple which was located at his hometown in Gwalior and made Chaturvedi listen to the song which he was taken aback. He co-wrote the lyrics with Rishi Pathak who also composed the track. Dharmadhikari wanted to give the song a grand treatment though Chaturvedi wanted to keep it as raw as possible.

Mulkawar composed the track "Siyavar Ramchandra Ki Jai". He was offered the film in April 2025 when he returned from a trip to Kainchi Dham overcoming his rough patch and recalled that expereince being "inexplicable" and "divine". He also worked on the background score of the film as well. Despite the budget constraints, Mulkawar did not want to compromise on any aspect. He record the track and score at his home studio with his fellow musicians as friends. He wanted to keep the background score cinematic but also being rooted and connected to the spirituality, culture, and belief in divinity. Visually impaired folk singer Sunil Lodhi performed the song "Maine Tere Hi Bharose" a rendition of the traditional folk number. Lodhi said that he had no formal training and had recorded the song in a raw way which impressed the makers.

== Release ==
The album featuring 11 tracks was released through Times Music on 11 July 2026.

== Track listing ==
No.	Title	Lyrics	Music	Singer(s)	Length
1.	"Aavagama"	Sadhu S. Tiwari	Sadhu S. Tiwari	Sadhu S. Tiwari	3:46
2.	"Saasa Haale"	Guru Goraksh Nath	Sadhu S. Tiwari	Sadhu S. Tiwari	3:17
3.	"Parvati"	Sadhu S. Tiwari	Sadhu S. Tiwari	Sadhu S. Tiwari	4:44
4.	"Maine Tere Hi Bharose"	Traditional	Traditional (folk)	Sunil Lodhi	2:56
5.	"Jai Hanuman"	Shreyas Dharmadhikari, Rishi Pathak	Rishi Pathak	Shreyas Dharmadhikari	4:03
6.	"Ram Bhajan Ki Or"	Rishi Pathak	Rishi Pathak	Nivedita Padmanabhan	3:38
7.	"Bajrang Baanka"	Traditional, Sadhu S. Tiwari	Sadhu S. Tiwari	Sadhu S. Tiwari	3:57
8.	"Vaishnav Jan To"	Traditional	Rishi Pathak	Rishi Pathak	3:09
9.	"Hey Kharari"	Sadhu S. Tiwari	Sadhu S. Tiwari	Sadhu S. Tiwari	2:42
10.	"Hriday Mein Jinke Sita Ram"	Vishal Chaturvedi	Vishal Chaturvedi	Vishal Chaturvedi	1:48
11.	"Siyavar Ramchandra Ki Jai"	Shantanu Sudame	Dhirendra Mulkawar	Shantanu Sudame, Dhirendra Mulkawar	2:42
Total length:					36:42

== Reception ==
=== Critical reception ===
The soundtrack received praise for the blending of devotional and North Indian folk music as well as the rootedness which made the album easily accessible. Archika Khurana of The Times of India said "The music and soundscape complement the film's reflective mood without overpowering the narrative. The devotional elements feel reasonably integrated into the storytelling, reinforcing its atmosphere rather than functioning merely as emotional cues." Sandeep Krishnarao Patil of Firstpost said, "The film's music is intriguing and it fuses the spiritual overtones with folk music. The songs 'Hey Kharari', 'Parvati' and 'Maine tere hi bharose Hanuman' clearly stand out and stay with the audience long after they leave the theatre." Critic based at Deccan Chronicle said that "The film's devotional soundtrack further enhances its spiritual atmosphere".

=== Commercial reception ===
After its theatrical release, the album crossed around 100 million streams on music streaming platforms. The song "Parvati" became viral after its global release. It topped YouTube India's weekly chart and entered the top two on YouTube's global charts.
