= Sunil Lodhi =

Indian folk singer

Sunil Lodhi is an Indian folk singer. He sang a Bhajan Maine tere hi bharose Hanuman in the 2026 released film Hanuman Ansh, which further increased his popularity. He is famous for singing songs in Bundeli. He was born in Agra Village of Sagar district in Madhya Pradesh. Sunil is blind from birth. In September 2026, he met Madhya Pradesh chief minister Mohan Yadav. The chief minister honored Sunil Lodhi and his parents and provided an honorarium of one lakh rupees. The chief minister also assured necessary support to restore Sunil Lodhi's eyesight.
