= Sarai Jagannath =

Village in Uttar Pradesh, India

Coordinates: 28°26′N 77°45′E

Sarai Jagannath is a village located roughly 1 km south of Bilsuri. It is Gram Panchayat in Sikandrabad Block, Sikandrabad Tehsil in Bulandshahr District of the Indian state of Uttar Pradesh.

== Attractions ==
A famous Lord Shiva temple is situated on a road between Bilsuri and Sarai Jagannath showing the Hindu roots in the region.

== Location ==
The closest city is Bulandshahr, which is the administrative headquarters of Bulandshahr District. New Delhi is 60 km northeast. Greater Noida is also one of the closest cities near this village.

Sarai Jagannath offers a local Steppe Climate. The area is considered humid subtropical bordering semi-arid and is particularly arid during the winter months.

== Demographics ==
According to 2011 census, the population was 859: 444 male and 415 female. The average literacy rate is 64.26% with 344 Male (out of 444) and 208 Female (out of 415).
