= Rahul Verma =

Indian humanitarian and spiritual worker

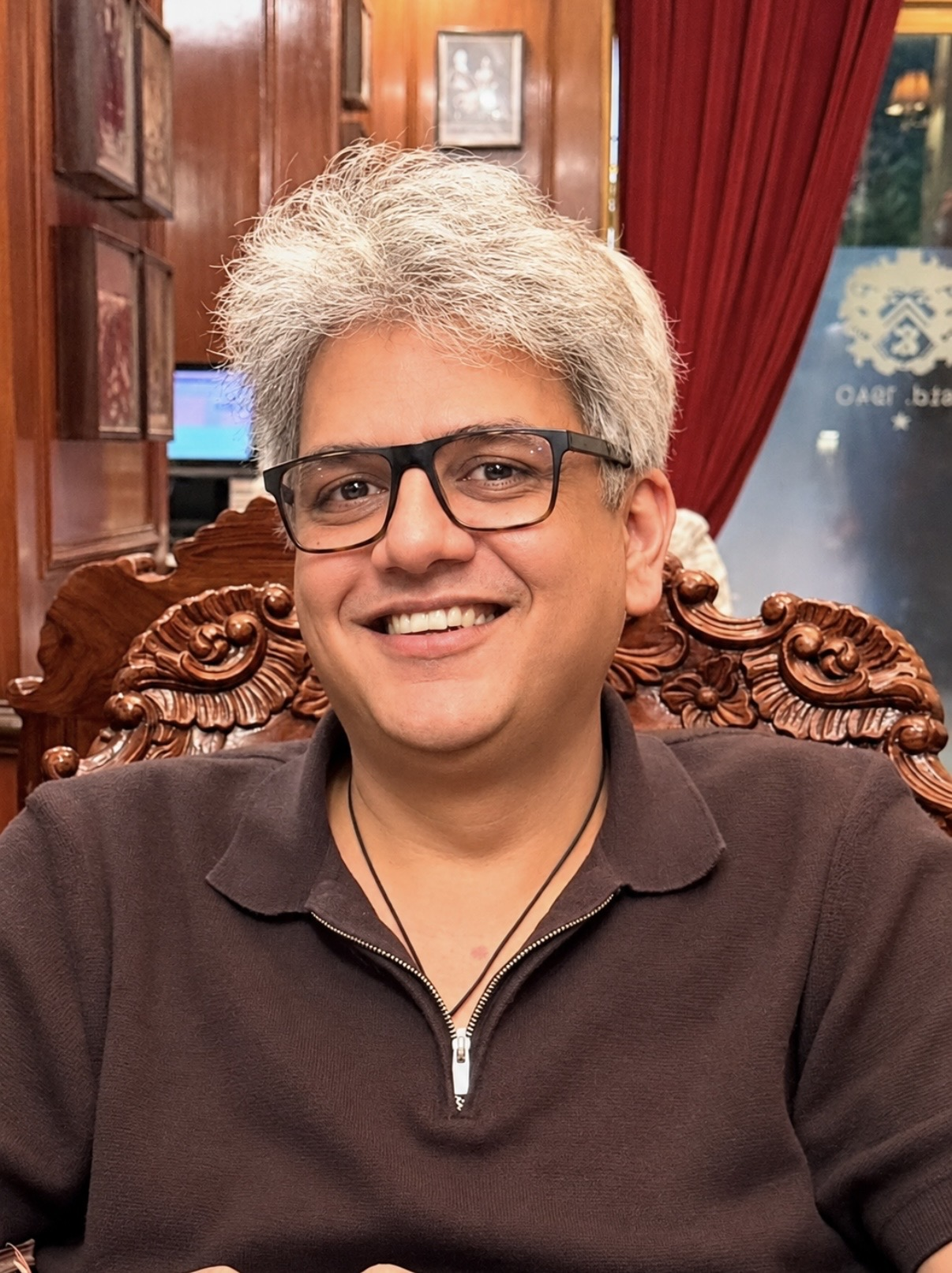
- Verma in 2026
- Born: Sikandrabad, Uttar Pradesh
- Education: Delhi College of Arts and Commerce,
- Occupations: Indian humanitarian, spiritual worker and Founder Uday Foundation
- Years active: 2007 – present

Rahul Verma is a humanitarian, spiritual worker, and a devoted follower of Neem Karoli Baba. He, along with his wife Tulika, founded the Uday Foundation—a nonprofit organization named after their son, who was born with multiple congenital defects. The New York Times has described him as a 'Man's Stand Against Junk Food as Diabetes Climbs Across India,' featuring his story on its front page.

Rahul turned to spiritual practices in search of inner peace. While meditating in Rishikesh, he encountered the teachings of Neem Karoli Baba, which profoundly resonated with him. Inspired by this divine connection, Rahul embraced regular meditation, leading to significant transformations in his life, including the improved health of his son, Arjunuday.

As his devotion to Neem Karoli Baba deepened, Rahul established the NKB Divine Meditation Centre in Delhi in 2024, following a transformative spiritual experience. Rahul now dedicates his life to these teachings, emphasising meditation, service, and the promotion of love and positive change.

== Uday Foundation ==
The Uday Foundation is a non-profit organisation based in New Delhi, India. The foundation works on health, support and dignity to homeless and disaster relief. The foundation supports homeless people with in-kind help, providing clothes, blankets, dry ration and dignity kits.

The foundation received the NGO Leadership & Excellence Awards 2015 by ABP News.

== NKB Divine Meditation Foundation ==
In 2024, Verma, a devoted follower of Neem Karoli Baba, founded NKB Divine Meditation, offering free guided meditation sessions based on the teachings of Neem Karoli Baba to help individuals connect with their inner peace and holistic well-being. This center is a sanctuary for spiritual seekers, guided by the teachings of Neem Karoli Baba, revered as an incarnation of Lord Hanuman.

== Writing and Opinion ==
Verma is also an opinion writer whose op-eds and commentaries regularly appear in publications including The Times of India, Hindustan Times, NDTV and Times Now.
