= Hanumangarhi, Nainital =

Hindu Temple in Uttarakhand

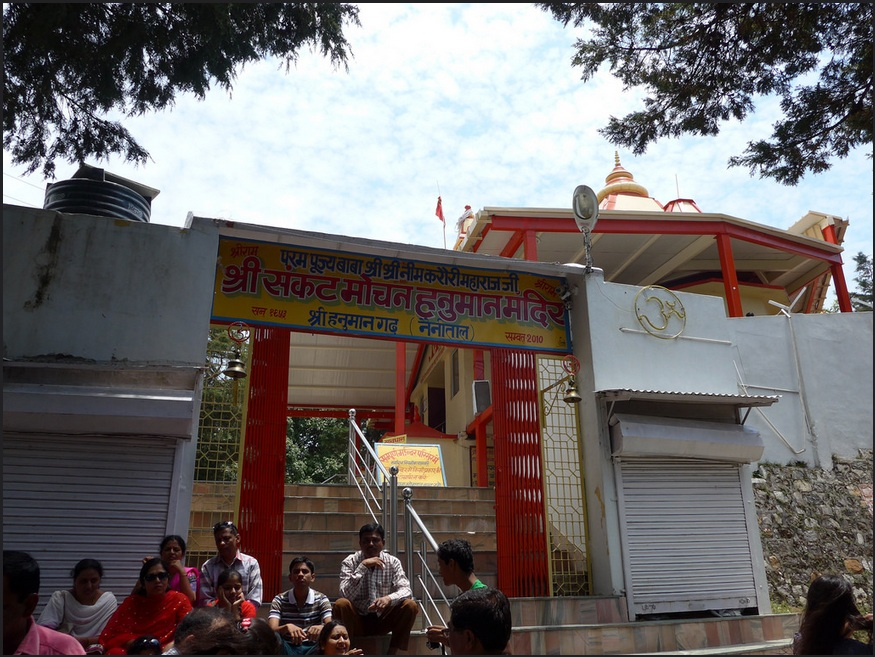
Entrance to Hanuman Garhi temple complex

Hanuman Garhi, Nainital (Hindi: हनुमानगढ़ी) is a Hindu temple complex dedicated to Lord Hanuman in the hill station of Nainital, India. It was built by local saint, Neem Karoli Baba in 1950, and predates his better-known Kainchi Dham ashram by more than a decade. Located at an altitude 1,951 m (6,401 ft), the temple complex is about 3.5 km (2 mi) from the Tallital (South End) bus stop.

== History ==
He first visited the site in 1950 when it was a graveyard for children and was avoided by locals. There, with the help of some devotees, they established a small kutiya (hut) and a small idol of Hanuman. In 1953, a large Hanuman statue was established, and the Shiv temple came up in 1957.

The presiding deity of the temple is Lord Hanuman, the vanara god of the Ramayana, and he is depicted tearing open his chest to reveal Rama and Sita in his heart. Hanuman Garhi is also known for its views of the setting sun.

== See also ==
- Kainchi Dham
- Ghorakhal
