= Naini, Prayagraj =

Naini Naini Industrial Area
- Neighbourhood
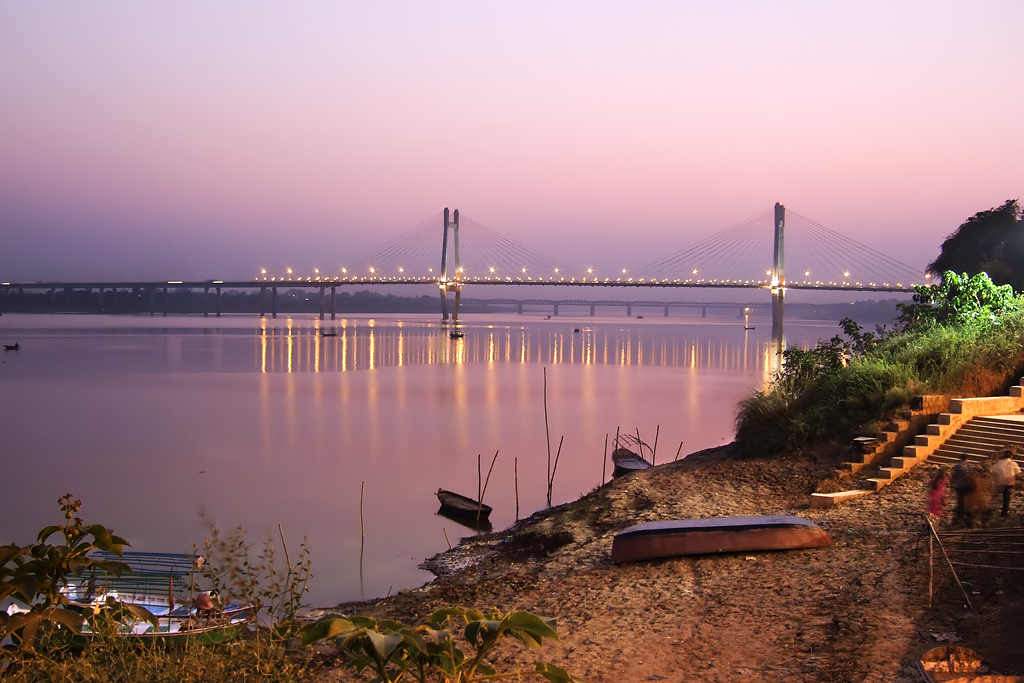
- New Yamuna Bridge connecting Naini to Prayagraj across Yamuna river
- Nickname: Neighborhood Of Prayagraj
- Interactive map of Naini
- Country: India
- State: Uttar Pradesh
- Division: Prayagraj division
- District: Prayagraj district
- Time zone: UTC+5:30 (IST)
- Vehicle registration: UP-70

Naini (also known as Naini Industrial Area) is an industrial township of Prayagraj in Prayagraj district, Uttar Pradesh, India. By the 1950s Naini was established as the chief industrial area of the city.

== History ==
Naini had a prison, Naini Central Prison, where many, including Pt. Jawahar Lal Nehru, the first Prime Minister of India—were imprisoned during the Indian independence movement. The first official Airmail flight in the world arrived in Naini from Prayagraj. Henri Pequet carried 6,500 letters a distance of 13 km. This was the first commercial civil aviation flight in India.

== Geography ==
Naini is located on the banks of River Yamuna, opposite Prayagraj City. To the north, across the Ganges, is Jhunsi, which is a part of Prayagraj itself. There are no direct paths or roadways between Jhusi and Naini.

== Economy ==
Naini developed into major industrial centre. Some of the notable industries in Naini include Alstom, ITI Limited, Bharat Pumps & Compressors (headquarters), Areva, Steel Authority of India Limited (SAIL), Food Corporation of India (FCI). Industrial development in Naini is increasing as the Government of India has approved Allahabad-Naini-Bara Investment Zone (3000 hectares) which is to be funded by the World Bank.

== Education ==
=== Education Institutions ===
- Prof. Rajendra Singh (Rajju Bhaiya) University
- Sam Higginbottom University of Agriculture, Technology and Sciences
- United College of Engineering and Research
- Bethany Convent School, Naini, Prayagraj
- Delhi Public School, Devrakh, Naini, Prayagraj
- St.Joseph's School, Naini, Prayagraj
- Ethel Higginbottom School and College
- Maharishi Vidya Mandir Sr. Secondary School, Prayagraj
- Suman Vidya Niketan Inter College, Naini, Prayagraj
- Nand Kishore Singh Degree College, Dhanuha, Chaka, Naini, Prayagraj
- Saint John's Academy, Mirzapur Road, Prayagraj
- Apex College of Education, Naini, Prayagraj
- Madhav Gyan Kendra Inter College Kharkauni, Naini, Prayagraj
- Kendriya Vidyalaya ITI Naini, Prayagraj
- Kendriya Vidyalaya COD Naini, Prayagraj
- Laurels International School, Naini
- Semstar Global School, Naini
- Amar Public School, Naini
- Hemwati Nandan Bahuguna PG College, Naini, Prayagraj
- Ranjit Pandit Inter College, Naini, Prayagraj
- Little Angels Public School, Naini, Prayagraj

== Transport ==
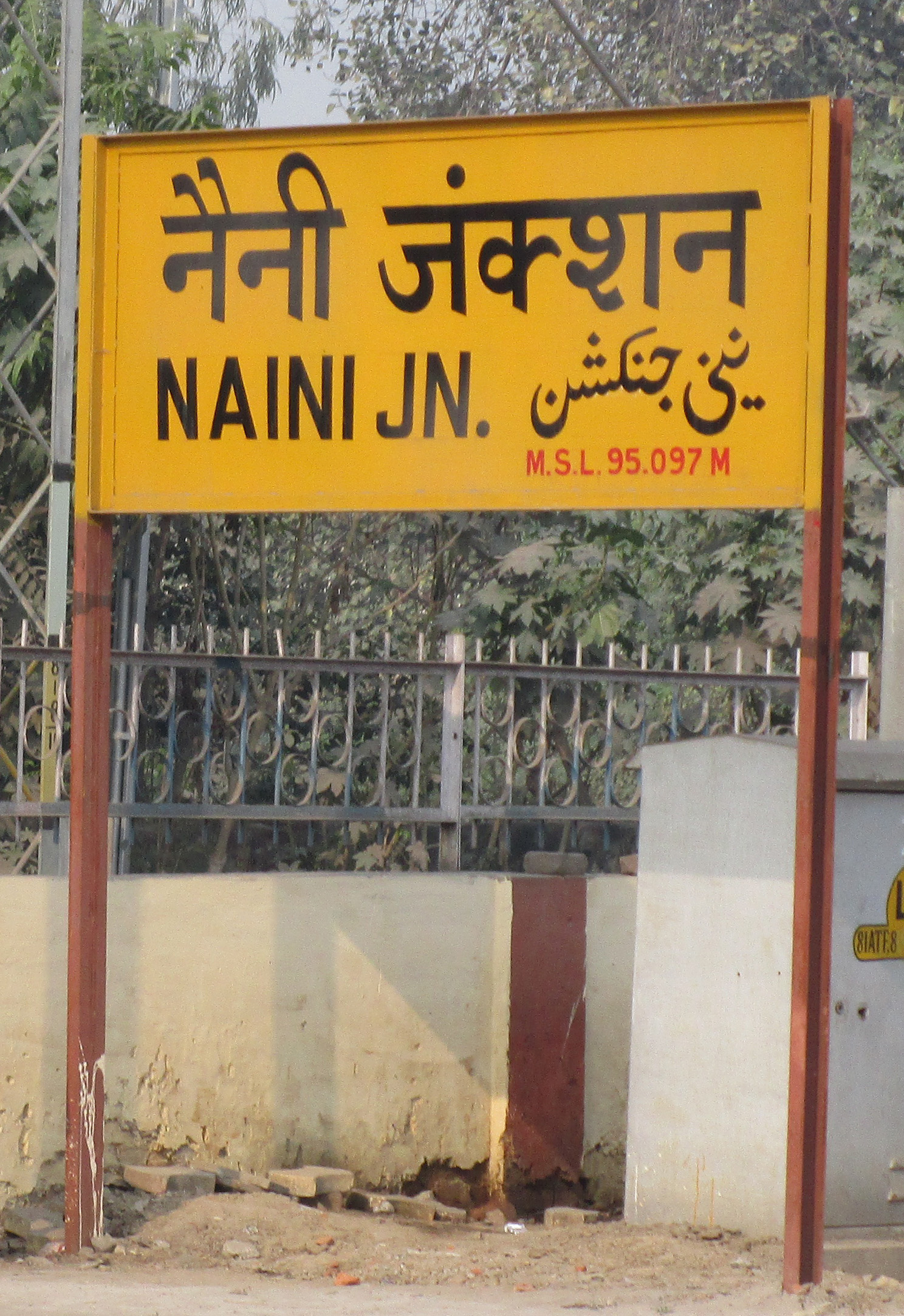
Naini Railway Junction Station nameplate.

Naini is connected to Prayagraj via two bridges over the river Yamuna. The older one, Old Naini Bridge built in 1927, is a two lane bridge. The new one, New Yamuna Bridge was completed in 2004. NH-27 joins the Naini to Rewa through Ghoorpur.

Tempos, Bus and autos are the main mode of travel in Naini-Prayagraj. This route doesn't have a very frequent local bus service, but recently, UPSRTC has launched the city bus services, making easier the public transportation from Naini to other nearby places, including heart of the city.

Apart from Naini Railway, Cheoki station is also used, but mainly it is used for transporting goods. However, in recent times, Cheoki railway station has started to become more important as many of the trains are getting their schedule changed where in it is replacing Prayagraj Junction itself.
