= Naini Central Jail =

Prison in Uttar Pradesh, India

Naini Central Prison
- Interactive map of Naini Central Prison
- Location: Naini, India
- Status: Open
- Security class: High security
- Capacity: 3,000
- Managed by: Uttar Pradesh Police

Naini Central Prison or Naini Jail at Naini, Prayagraj, is one of the most important correctional Institutions in Uttar Pradesh, built during the British Raj.

== Independence movement ==
The prison played a large role in the pre-independence era, when many freedom fighters, including Motilal Nehru (1930), Pt. Jawaharlal Nehru (the first prime minister of India), Govind Ballabh Pant, Narendra Dev, Rafi Ahmed Kidwai, Hasrat Mohani were imprisoned there during Indian independence movement. During his stay, Nehru wrote a series of letters to his young daughter Indira from the prison, starting on her thirteenth birthday until 9 August 1933. These were later published as Glimpses of World History.

On 1 March 1941, Mahatma Gandhi visited the prison, to see imprisoned freedom fighters Vijayalakshmi Pandit and Abul Kalam Azad.

Indira Gandhi herself (later prime minister of India) was arrested along with her husband Feroze Gandhi and spent her prison term in Naini, from 11 September 1942 until 13 May 1943.

== Issues ==
The prison has witnessed security concerns as it houses not just a few members of parliament, but sharpshooters and gang lords from Purvanchal, including Sujeet Belwa and Rajesh Yadav, and rumours that gang wars were being raged from inside the prison. Many militants belonging to the Jaish-e-Mohammad and Lashkar-e-Taiba are also imprisoned here.

In 2008, 97 prisoners who had already completed their sentences wrote to the president of India asking to be euthanised. That same year, 17 inmates died over a period of five months, and as many as 239 inmates were found to be suffering from ailments like tuberculosis, scabies and water-borne diseases, forcing the government to implement improved health services available to the incarcerated.
