= Ordnance Clothing Factory, Shahjahanpur =

Indian clothing factory

The Ordnance Clothing Factory, Shahjahanpur is one of the oldest clothing factories in India, established in 1914 for the purpose of producing garments for use by the Indian military.

== History ==
In 1879, Sir Ashley Eden, Lt. Governor of Bengal, founded three clothing factories in Bombay, Alipur and Madras for the stitching of garments. In 1914, a part of the Alipur factory was moved to Shahjahanpur on an experimental basis for 1 year and named Army Clothing Factory, Shahjahanpur. In 1925, the entire Alipur factory was closed and its work was permanently transferred to Shahjahanpur.

Shahjahanpur is about 180 kilometres (110 mi) from Lucknow and 330 kilometres (210 mi) from New Delhi. The factory produces textiles and clothing items for the Indian Army, navy and air force, the Director-General of the Border Roads Organization, the Ministry of Home Affairs and other civil authorities. The factory is covers an area 20.02 hectares and the estate itself is spread over an area of 125.1 hectares.

== Main products ==
The principal products are as under:

Indian Army

Balnket Barrack NG
Cap FS Disruptive (With Army Logo)
Cap Glacier
Coat Combat (with Army Logo)
Coat ECC
Blanket Superior OG
Jacket Wind Cheater
Jersey V-Neck Woollen Dark OG
Net Mosquito RM POLY. FR Khaki
Shirt Angola
Shirt PWPVDDOG
Socks Mens Wool Dark OG
Trousers Serge
Trousers PWPVDDOG
Trousers Wind Cheater
Vest FSOG
Jacket Combat Army Logo
Trousers Combat Army Logo
Overall Winter
Smoke Denisan
Hospital Blanket Red

Indian Air Force

Blanket Air Force Blue
Cap FSBG Modified
Cap FS Disruptive
Coat Combat ICK
Trousers Terry Wool BG
Jersey Woollen Dark BG
Shirt Angola Light Blue
Shirt Angola Light Gray
Shirt Angola Khaki
Socks Woollen Black
Socks Woollen Dark OG
Suit Terry Wool BG
Trousers Serge

Indian Navy

Socks Dark OG

== See also ==
- Ordnance Factories Board
- Ordnance Clothing Factory
