= Sikandrabad =

- City
- Location in Uttar Pradesh, India
- Coordinates: 28.4511868°N 77.6954506°E
- Country: India
- State: Uttar Pradesh
- District: Bulandshahr
- Established: 1498
- Founder: Sikandar Lodi

Government
  - Type: Legislative Assembly
  - MLA: Mr. Lakshmiraj Singh (Bhartiya Janta Party)

Population (2011)
  - Total: 294,858
  - Male: 157,275
  - Female: 137,583
- Demonym: Sikandrabadi

Demographics
  - Literacy Rate: 61.09 %
  - Sex Ratio: 875

Languages
  - Official: Hindi
  - Local dialect: Khadi Boli
- Time zone: UTC+05:30 (IST)
- PIN Code: 203205
- Area Code: 05735
- Vehicle registration: UP-13
- Website: bulandshahar.nic.in

Sikandrabad is a city and a municipal board, just outside of Bulandshahr city in Bulandshahr district in the Indian state of Uttar Pradesh. It is part of the Delhi NCR region. Sikandrabad tehsil is now a part of Bulandshahr district which is situated throughout 60+ villages.

== History ==
Sikandrabad was a significant town and tehsil located in the north-western region of Bulandshahr District in the North-Western Provinces. Stretching inland from the east bank of the Jumna (Jamund) and watered by two branches of the Ganges Canal, Sikandrabad held strategic importance in the area. The East Indian Railway passed through the tahsil, with stations at Sikandrabad and Dadri. Covering an area of 524 square miles, including 370 square miles of cultivated land, the tahsil had a population of 37,374 as of 1872. The land revenue collected amounted to ₹28,996, while the total government revenue was ₹32,112, with a rental payment of ₹76,132 made by the cultivators.

Founded by Sikandar Lodi in 1498, Sikandrabad became the headquarters of a mahal during the reign of Akbar. It served as the center of the fief of Najib-ud-daula and played a crucial role in the region's history. In 1736, Saddat Khan, the Viceroy of Oudh, launched an attack on the force in Sikandarabad, resulting in their defeat. The town witnessed further military activities when the Jat army of Bhartpur encamped there in 1764. However, following the death of Suraj Mal and the defeat of Maharaja Sawai Jawahar, they fled across the Jamuna (Jamund). The Maharaja' brigade under Perron also occupied Sikandrabad after the Battle of Aligarh.

During the Mutiny of 1857, Sikandrabad was joined by the neighboring Gujars, Rajputs, and Muslims, followed by the arrival of Colonel Edward Greathed on September 27, 1857.

Sikandrabad boasted several landmarks, including a fortified building that housed the tahsil and police station outside the town. It also had a charitable dispensary, an Anglo-vernacular school, and a branch of the Church of England Mission. The town was adorned with several impressive mosques and temples, adding to its cultural richness.

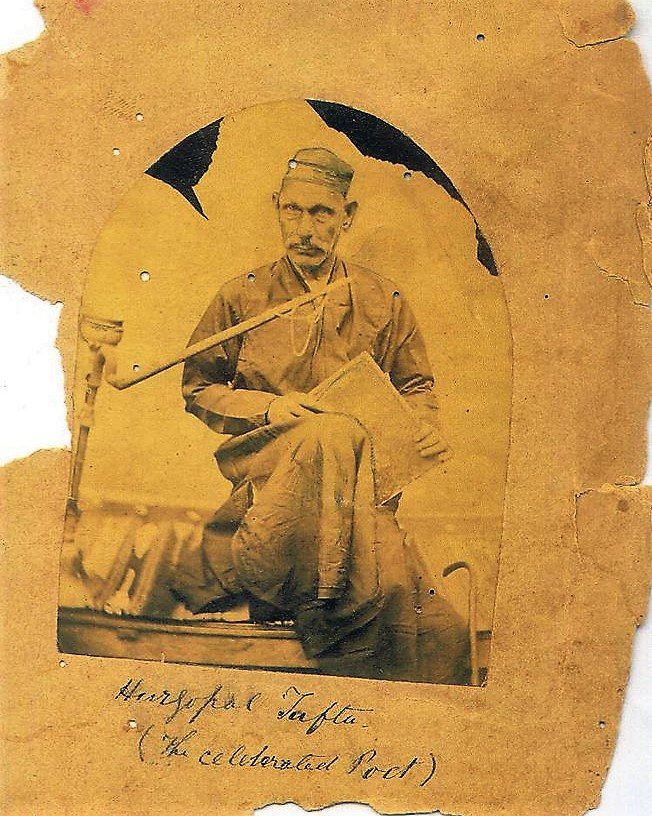
Munshi Hargopal Tafta

Notable residents included Munshi Hargopal Tafta (1799-1879) a renowned Persian and Urdu poet. He was one of Ghalib`s beloved disciples. He affectionately called him `Mirza Tafta'. It was Tafta`s commendatory preface to Urdu-i-Mu`alla (Ghalib's Urdu letters collection published in 1869) that marked beginning of critical writings on Ghalib.

Sikandrabad was also known for its pagri (head-dress) manufacturing industry.

Dr. Jamuna Prasad Sharma is a significant historical figure in Sikandrabad who notably elevated local medical facilities. He established a clinic in 1915 that remains active, with the fourth generation of his family continuing to serve the community, representing a lasting legacy of healthcare in the town. https://www.justdial.com/Sikandrabad/Dr-Jamuna-Prasad-Clinic-Near-Hanuman-Mandir-Sikandrabad/9999P5732-5732-180531225428-Y1D9_BZDET?source=SHARE&amp=1&_gl=1*c5fd5v*_ga*Y01iZHg3NFQ1aFpmbFk5WkF4VVQteEFKNE42bzBpa1I2VmpJQW9lQXpCeGpESnZfdzFMemZDQmJZbllVVW9ISg..

Connectivity was facilitated by a station on the East Indian Railway, situated 4 miles south of the town and connected by a metalled road. The municipal revenue for 1875-76 amounted to ₹1,519, with taxes contributing ₹660, which equated to 1 shilling and 0.5 pence per head of the population within the municipal limits.

Sikandrabad is listed in the saini community as a pargana under Delhi sarkar, producing a revenue of 1,259,190 dams for the imperial treasury and supplying a force of 400 infantry and 50 cavalry.

Shanti Swaroop Bhatnagar contributed to scientific development in India, completing his secondary education at Dayanand Anglo-Vedic High School in Sikandrabad. He served as the inaugural director of the National Institute of Hydrology and conducted research across multiple scientific disciplines.

According to the book Gandhi: 1915-1948; A Detailed Chronology, compiled by C. B. Dalal, it is worth noting that Mahatma Gandhi visited Sikandrabad on November 3, 1929, to address a women's meeting organized by the Jilla Congress Committee.

== Education ==
Sikandrabad witnessed notable progress in educational facilities in late 19th Century. Prior to this period, private Maktabs and pathshalas, along with those associated with mosques and temples, provided basic education in language, arithmetic, history, and geography. The town school, under the District Board, was established around the late 19th century.

The Kayastha English Middle School, initiated by prominent individuals such as M. Jamna Swarup and M. Roshan Lal, was founded in 1886. Later, in 1896, it transformed into the Anglo-Vernacular School, becoming the first of its kind in the district. Subsequently, in 1943, it evolved into the Mukund Swarup Intermediate College, with generous support from M. Mukund Swarup Saheb.

Key Figures and Contributions: Throughout its history, the institution witnessed the leadership and contributions of notable individuals. Managers such as M. Govind Swarup, L. Gokal Chand Vakil, and Rai Bahadur Jatan Swarup played instrumental roles in its development. Head Masters like Pt. Balak Ram and Shri Madho Narain Mathur, along with Principals including Shri B.B.L. Kashiva and Shri P.K. Banergee, made significant contributions to the institution's growth.

Under the guidance of Govind Swarup and Pt. Balak Ram, the school achieved considerable success, attracting students from distant places and maintaining a reputable staff. However, internal conflicts between the manager and headmaster in 1917 led to a reconstitution of the school. During L. Gokal Chand's tenure, the school faced challenges due to the withdrawal of support from the wealthy Vaish community. Nonetheless, progress continued, including the completion of the Boarding House and the acquisition of additional land.

In 1936, the institution celebrated its golden jubilee, revitalizing interest among the management, staff, and students. New initiatives were undertaken, such as the establishment of an Old Boys Association, introduction of co-education and Harijan education, and the promotion of scouting. The school also became a center for high school examinations, and the K. Prasad Museum was inaugurated. The institution's name changed to Mukund Swarup A.V. High School in recognition of M. Mukund Swarup Saheb's generous donation.

The college's transformation into the Mukund Swarup Intermediate College in 1943 marked a significant milestone. Despite financial challenges, subsequent principals like Shri B.B.L. Kashiva and Shri K.B. Bhatia, along with the support of the Swarup family, ensured the institution's ongoing growth. In 1959, Jatan Swarup Degree College was established, further expanding educational opportunities under the same management.

== Demographics ==
As of 2011 India census, Sikandrabad had a population of 3,85,000. Men constitute 52% of the population and Women 48%. Sikandrabad has an average literacy rate of 50%, lower than the national average of 59.5%: male literacy is 58%, and female literacy is 49%. In Sikandrabad, 17% of the population is under 6 years of age.

== Location ==
Sikandrabad is located on both sides of the Grand Trunk (G.T.) Road in the Bulandshahr district of Uttar Pradesh, India. Situated approximately 51 km south of the national capital, Delhi, Sikandrabad is well-connected by both road and rail networks. The nearest railway station is Dankaur, located about 6 km from the city, which provides convenient access to other major cities in the region.

The city serves as a vital junction, with direct road connectivity to nearby towns such as Dadri, Gulaothi, Khair, Khurja, Jhajjar, and Noida. Additionally, Sikandrabad is just 6 km from Greater Noida, enhancing its accessibility for commuters and travelers. The district headquarters, Bulandshahr, is approximately 18 km away.

Sikandrabad has a PIN (Postal Index Number) of 203205 and an STD code prefix of 05735. The city houses two post offices, offering services such as Speedpost to cater to the postal needs of its residents. With its strategic location and robust infrastructure, Sikandrabad plays an essential role in the economic and social landscape of the region.

== Notable people ==
- Acharya Chatursen Shastri Hindi writer, known for Vaishali Ki Nagarvadhu.
- Santosh Anand Bollywood Song writer.
- Rahul Verma is a humanitarian, spiritual worker, and devotee of Neem Karoli Baba.
- Saini community The sikandrabad region has the largest population. These people have been living in this region for a long time and there is a strong unity among them which has not been broken even by any king or emperor.
