= Hanuman Ansh =

2026 Indian film by Vishal Chaturvedi

- Theatrical release poster
- Directed by: Vishal Chaturvedi
- Written by: Vishal Chaturvedi
- Based on: Divine Detour: That Changed My Life by Vishal Chaturvedi
- Produced by: Ragini Sona; Namrata G. Singh; Anupriya A Nagar⁣ Dr Vishal Chaturvedi
- Starring: Shobhinaw Satyaa; Chandan Anand; Purnima Tiwari; Vihaan Shedge; Anil Rastogi
- Cinematography: Vishal Bawa
- Edited by: Shankh Rajadhyaksha
- Music by: Sadhu Sushil Tiwari
- Production companies: Swambhu Media Network; Holy Cow Home Productions
- Distributed by: Cinépolis (India); Panorama Studios (Delhi-UP only); Hombale Films (Overseas)
- Release dates: 7 August 2026 (India); 11 September 2026 (Overseas)
- Running time: 150 minutes
- Country: India
- Language: Hindi
- Budget: ₹1.7 crore
- Box office: ₹442.50 crore

Hanuman Ansh (transl. Fragment/Descendant of Hanuman) is a 2026 Indian Hindi-language biographical film written, directed and produced by Vishal Chaturvedi under his banner, Swambhu Media Network. Serving as the first instalment of a trilogy, it is based on his book Divine Detour: That Changed My Life, based on the life of Neem Karoli Baba. It stars Shobhinaw Satyaa and Chandan Anand in the lead roles while Anil Rastogi, Purnima Tiwwari, Sugandha Malhotra, Bhagvandas Patel, and Neha Paranjpe. The first film follows the early life of young boy Lakshmi Narayan, in pre-Independence India, who leaves home after the death of his mother in search of God, and his subsequent journey through Northern India and transformation into Neem Karoli Baba.

Vishal Bawa handled the cinematography, while Shankh Rajadhyaksha handled the editing. The sound was designed by Shishir Chousalkar and Mayur Mohanan, while the visual effects were handled by Pankaj Vashisht. The film was released theatrically on 7 August 2026. Initially opening with low earnings at the box office, the film later garnered positive reception through word of mouth from the third week of release and emerged as a sleeper hit. It is the 4th highest-grossing Hindi film of 2026, the 6th highest grossing Indian film of 2026, and the 17th highest grossing Hindi film domestically.

It is one of the most profitable films of all time by Return of Investment (ROI), having been made on a reported budget of less than ₹2 crore.

== Plot ==
Lakshminarayan Sharma, aged thirteen, leaves his hometown of Akbarpur in the Braj region after the death of his beloved mother, believing that only Shri Rama can reunite them. Inspired by the Hanuman Chalisa, he seeks union with Rama through Hanuman. At a Vaishnava temple in Rajkot, Gujarat, the elderly Mahant recognises his spiritual inclination and tests him. Lakshminarayan remains quiet and unassuming, rejecting comfort and praise before leaving, suggesting that institutions themselves can become forms of bondage.

For years, Lakshminarayan wanders, meditating beneath trees, sleeping beside rivers and living on alms. He deepens his spirituality through nature and encounters various ascetics, particularly those of the Nath Sampradaya and Naga sadhus. On one occasion, he remains underwater so long that villagers believe he has drowned, before eventually resurfacing. At twenty-five, he boards a first-class passenger train without a ticket. A colonial official orders him off the train, but it mysteriously refuses to move despite officials finding no mechanical fault. The railway manager concludes that Lakshmandas, one of the names he later adopts, is responsible. The officials seek his forgiveness, and he miraculously produces four first-class tickets, prompting them to recognise their misconduct. At the officer's family's urging, they apologise and ask him to return. Lakshmandas says he needs nothing because Hanuman ji provides for him, but demands that no saint in India be removed from trains for lacking a ticket and that a station be built for local residents. The officer agrees, after which Lakshmandas forgives them and boards the train.

The station, later known as Baba Lakshman Das Puri Halt Station in present-day Farrukhabad district, becomes associated with him, and Lakshmandas thereafter becomes known as Neem Karoli Baba. A villager recognises him as a former resident of Braj and informs his father, who finds him and reveals that he was customarily married in childhood to a girl named Rambeti. The film notes that child marriage is now illegal and the custom has been abolished. Reluctantly accepting his responsibility, like Lord Ram, Lakshman returns home and formally remarries Rambeti. After ensuring that she has sufficient food, he leaves to visit Neebkarori, but later departs following a dispute with the landowner of the temple site and travels to Kainchi mountain near Nainital.

There, he helps a frightened man who has lost his way at night. After the man recites the Hanuman Chalisa, Maharaj ji appears and guides him safely. The film ends by hinting at a sequel.

== Cast ==
- Shobhinaw Satyaa as Lakshmi Narayan Sharma / Neem Karoli Baba
- Chandan K Anand as Ram Nandan Bhosale
- Nikhil Dubey as Sudhir
- Anil Rastogi as Mahant Ji
- Sugandha Malhotra as Sudhi
- Bhagvandas Patel as Gopal
- Neha Paranjpe as Parvati
- Udaysinh Rajput as Banshidhar
- Purnima Tiwari as Ram Beti
- Gautam Tripathi as Radheshyam
- Gulshan Pandey as Inspector Dharam Singh
- Rajiv Mishra as Daroga Nasir Khan
- Rishikesh Dubey as Poornanand Tiwari
- Vihaan Shedge as Maharaj Ji Teen
- Sadvik Sharma as Shubhankar
- Aleksei Danilov as Mr Francis
- Santosh Dixit as Hariram
- Brijpal Singh as Shankar
- Yash Pandey as Hiren
- Aman Mehta as Champaklal
- Rajnish Srivastava as Jagdish
- Abhishek Mishra as Chand Chor (thief)
- Amit Dubey as TTE (train sequence)

== Production ==
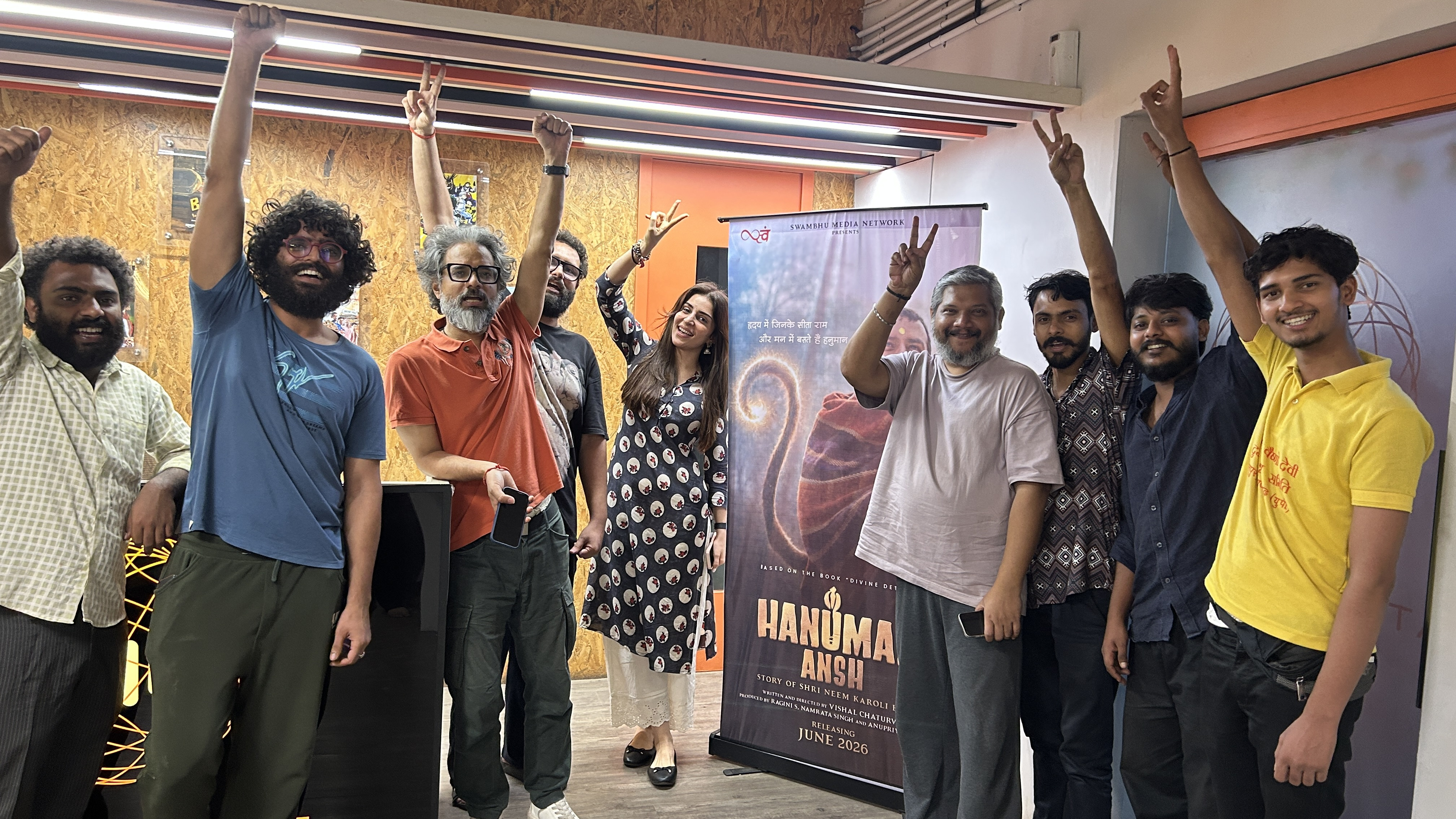
Hanuman Ansh Crowd dubbing team at Recording Studio, Mumbai, June 2026

The film is the first instalment of a planned trilogy series inspired by director Dr Vishal Chaturvedi's own spiritual memoir, Divine Detour: That Changed My Life. In an interview, Chaturvedi said that his research began informally around 2009 and became more systematic in 2016–17, before expanding further during 2022–23, and took to various places associated with Baba, including Vrindavan, Akbarpur, Neeb Karori, and Lucknow. The final screenplay primarily drew upon stories he collected and accounts documented in books and other sources.

The film was made on a budget of ₹2 crore, though some reports place the production cost at ₹1.8 crore. Principal photography took place in November 2025, mainly in Chitrakoot including the opening scene, which was shot in Punjabi Baba Ashram in Chitrakoot, as well as key sequences like the installation of a Hanuman idol and the construction of Baba's cave. Some of the shooting also took place in Mumbai. In the first schedule itself, the original unnamed actor for the leading role fell ill. Shobhinaw Satyaa, who was the film's second assistant director at the time, auditioned for the role and was subsequently cast in the leading role of Neem Karoli Baba, replacing the original unnamed actor.

== Soundtrack ==
The soundtrack of Hanuman Ansh consists of multiple devotional tracks. The music of the soundtrack was composed by Sadhu S. Tiwari, Rishi Pathak, Vishal Chaturvedi and Dhirendra Mulkawar and lyrics were written by Sadhu S. Tiwari, Guru Goraksh Nath, Shreyas Dharmadhikari, Rishi Pathak and Vishal Chaturvedi.

== Release ==
=== Theatrical ===
Hanuman Ansh was scheduled to be released in theatres in India on 31 July 2026, but it was postponed and released on 7 August 2026. The film was released in Hindi, with subtitles in the Braj and Bundeli languages. Cinépolis India is the film's distributor in India. The first-look posters and teaser were released through the film's official social media accounts. The official trailer was released on 18 July 2026 on the Times Music YouTube channel.

The film was released in overseas markets on 11 September 2026, with Hombale Films handling its international distribution.

=== Home media ===
The film will begin streaming on SonyLIV from 27 November 2026.

== Reception ==
=== Box office ===
The film had a weak initial theatrical opening alongside Awarapan 2 and Batwara 1947., as it opened in approximately 250 theatres and made Rs 90 lakh in the first week. However, subsequently, it gained audiences primarily through word of mouth and the face competition from Toxic, and after 3 weeks, the film was declared a "surprise box office success." The film opened on approximately 250 screens, which reduced to around 40 screens in its second week. Gradually as the audience demand increased, distributor Cinepolis India progressively expanded its release to over 2,000 screens across India. By 1 September, the film's domestic total had risen to ₹48.78 crore net and ₹57.54 crore gross. On September 3, Hombale Films acquired the international distribution rights for the film, with its overseas release scheduled for 11 September 2026.

Hanuman Ansh has become the highest theatrical return on investment of all time, along with another devotional film, Jai Santoshi Maa (1975). The film was made on a budget of approximately ₹2 crore; the film crossed ₹100 crore at the domestic box office, earning more than 50 times its production budget, making it the most profitable Indian film of all time. The film earned over ₹48 crore in its fifth weekend and became the highest earner, beating Dhurandhar: The Revenge.

On September 5, Uttarakhand Chief Minister Pushkar Singh Dhami watched the film in Dehradun, and subsequently the film was made tax-free in the state.

=== Critical reception ===
While the narrative of the film sometimes made Archika Khurana wonder whether she was watching "a collection of spiritual anecdotes rather than a tightly constructed cinematic journey," and the pacing was "sluggish in places" for her, she reserved praise for Satyya's restrained performance for not resorting to "exaggerated mannerisms or theatrical solemnity," but instead relying on "stillness, pauses and expressive silences," and the unobtrusive direction for "letting the characters and their experiences carry the emotional weight rather than forcing spirituality through visual grandeur." She also thought that the music "complemented the film's reflective mood without overpowering the narrative."

Simran Singh also considered the film sluggish in the first half, though he thought that the film becomes engaging and entertaining as it went along. He had similar praise for Satyaa for embodying innocence, calmness and aura, though other actors failed to leave an impression on him. The music was below-the-mark for him, except for the background score that "saves the film." Additionally, he believed that the set design looked cartoonish, but because of the film's limited budget, he regarded it a minor problem.

== Sequel ==
The film was planned as a trilogy, and the first film ends with an indication that the story of Neem Karoli Baba will continue. In September 2026, Chaturvedi confirmed that work on the second installment had already begun, which will cover the periods associated with Agra and Mathura, while the first installment covered Neem Karoli Baba's early life, starting in Firozabad until his youth.

== See also ==
- Kainchi Dham
- Sankat Mochan Temple
