= Mahuaa News =

Mahuaa News was a 24-hour Hindi/Bhojpuri news channel launched in 2008. The news channel covered local news of Bihar and Jharkhand, India as well as other national and international news.
