= Bharat Pumps & Compressors =

Public-sector undertaking owned by the Ministry of Heavy Industries of India

Bharat Pumps & Compressors Limited
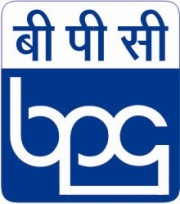
- Type: Central Public Sector Undertaking
- Industry: Ministry of Heavy Industries, Government of India
- Founded: 1970
- Headquarters: Prayagraj, Uttar Pradesh, India
- Key people: Shri Sunil Parwani (Chairman & Managing Director)
- Products: Reciprocating pump Centrifugal pump Reciprocating compressor Gas cylinder
- Number of employees: 990
- Website: www.bpcnaini.co.in

Bharat Pumps & Compressors Limited (BPC) is a central public sector undertaking (PSU) under the ownership of the Ministry of Heavy Industries, Government of India. The PSU manufactures reciprocating pumps, centrifugal pumps, reciprocating compressors, and high pressure seamless gas cylinders. Headquarters in Prayagraj.

== History ==
BPC was set up in 1970 to cut the country’s dependence on import of hi-tech equipment like pumps and compressors for use in critical areas like oil and gas exploration, refineries, chemical and fertilizer plant and nuclear plants. However, the company was unable to make profits. Eventually, it turned sick and was referred to the Board for Industrial and Financial Restructuring (BIFR). BPC’s losses had accumulated to ₹1,753 million (US$19 million) as on 31 March 2005 and the net worth had turned negative at ₹1,216 million (US$13 million). The company was referred to the BIFR and was on the verge of being closed down after 35 years of operations.

The company has seen a dramatic turnaround in its performance from the financial year 2005-06. The company’s profit before tax (PBT) in the financial year 2006-07 was ₹191 million (US$2.0 million), which increased to ₹311 million (US$3.3 million) in 2009-10. During the same period, its net worth increased from ₹569.6 million (US$6.1 million) to ₹1,241 million (US$13 million). The turnover went up to ₹2,711 million (US$29 million) in 2009-10 from ₹1,437 million (US$15 million) in 2006-07. The turnaround of the company is credited to Abhay Kumar Jain, who was appointed the MD of the sick company in the year 2005-06. The special efforts and corporate strategies put in place by Jain, after joining on 31.12.2005, yielded the much awaited turnaround of the Company. BPCL achieved a net profit of ₹1.84 crores during Financial Year 2005-06 after accounting for interest amounting to ₹135 million as against a loss of ₹108.6 million during previous year 2004-05. This remarkable feat of turnaround is of significance since it was achieved without considering the benefits of financial restructuring. Presently, the company is again running in loss. Jain invested nearly ₹100 crores in purchase of new machines and had projected business of ₹1600 crores but this target was never achieved and as a result, company incurred loss.

On the 28th of September 2016, the Government of India announced the privatization of Bharat Pumps & Compressors. On 17 April 2018 the Government of India issued an Expression of Interest for a 100% stake in Bharat Pumps & Compressors.

On the 14th of Jan 2021, the Government of India announced the liquidation of Bharat Pumps & Compressors.
