= Kainchi Dham =

Spiritual ashram and temple in Uttarakhand, India

Coordinates: 29.42254742°N 79.5124504°E

- कैंची धाम
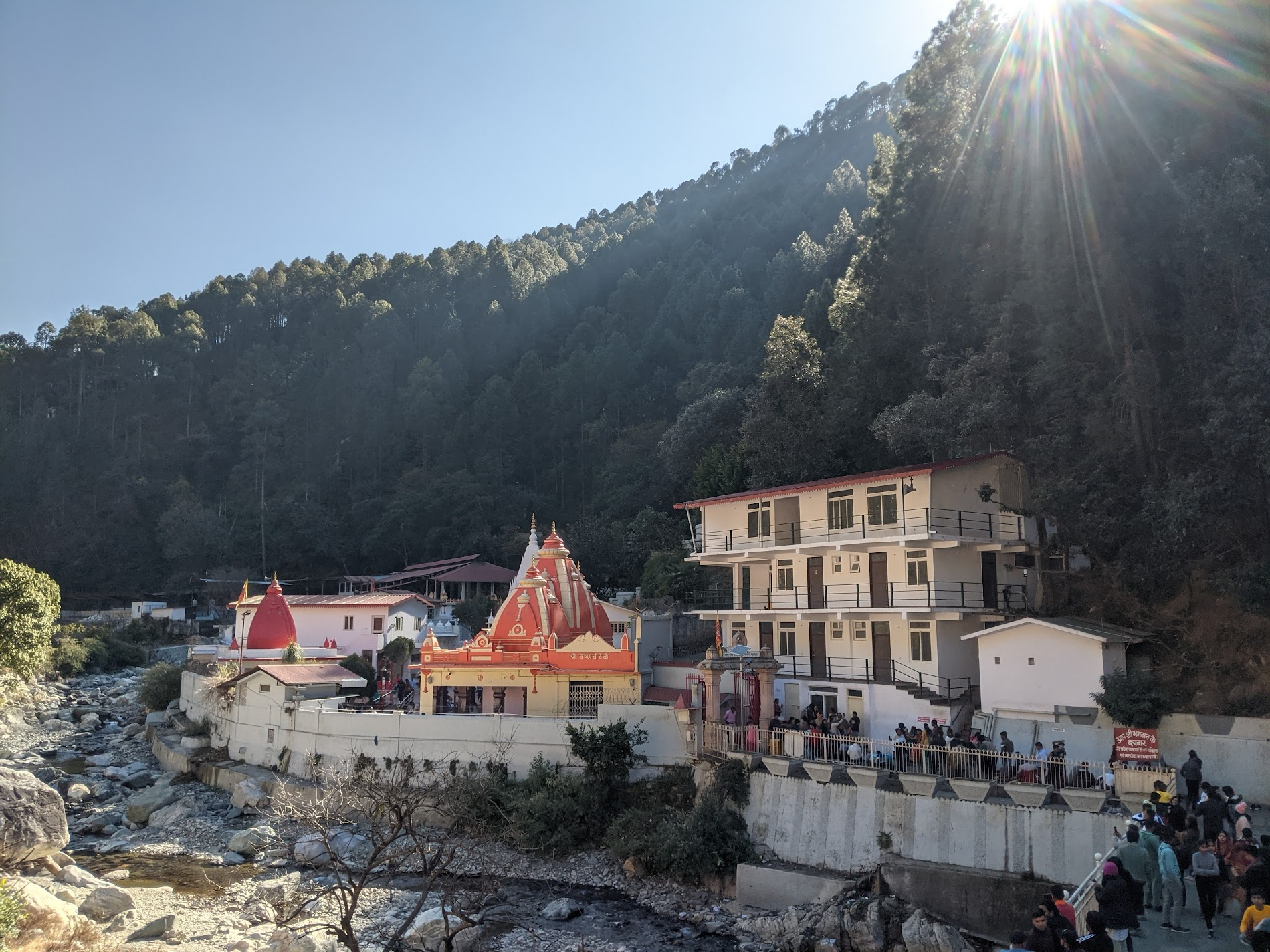
- Kainchi Dham complex

Religion
- Affiliation: Hinduism
- District: Nainital district
- Deity: Neem Karoli Baba, Hanuman, Vaishno Devi
- Festivals: Kainchi Dham Mela or Pratishtha Diwas (Foundation Day, 15 June)

Location
- State: Uttarakhand
- Country: India
- Interactive map of Kainchi Dham

Architecture
- Type: Hindu temple architecture

Kainchi Dham, also known as Neem Karori Ashram, is a Hindu ashram and temple complex located at Kainchi in the Nainital district, Kumaon region of Uttarakhand, India. It is closely associated with the Hindu saint Neem Karoli Baba, also known as Neeb Karori Baba. It is situated on the banks of small mountain river, Shipra, at a distance of 9 km from Bhowali and 17 km from Nainital, on the Nainital–Almora Road.

The ashram was established by Neem Karoli Baba in 1964 on land donated by a local resident, Purnanand. The complex includes a temple dedicated to Hanuman, which was consecrated on 15 June 1964, and Kainchi subsequently became the principal ashram of Neem Karoli Baba, in his later years. Today, it continues to attract a large number of pilgrims from India and abroad. Its international recognition developed 1960s and 70s, partly through Western disciples of Neem Karoli Baba, including Ram Dass, Krishna Das and Larry Brilliant, and later through widely reported visits by Steve Jobs and Mark Zuckerberg. In 2020s, Kainchi Dham saw a rise in number of visitors, from around 800,000 annually in previous years, it rose to 2.4 million in 2024.Visitor numbers at Kainchi Dham increased substantially during the 2020s. In June 2025, the Uttarakhand government stated that approximately 2.4 million devotees had visited the shrine during the preceding year, compared with an average of around 800,000 in earlier years.

== Etymology ==
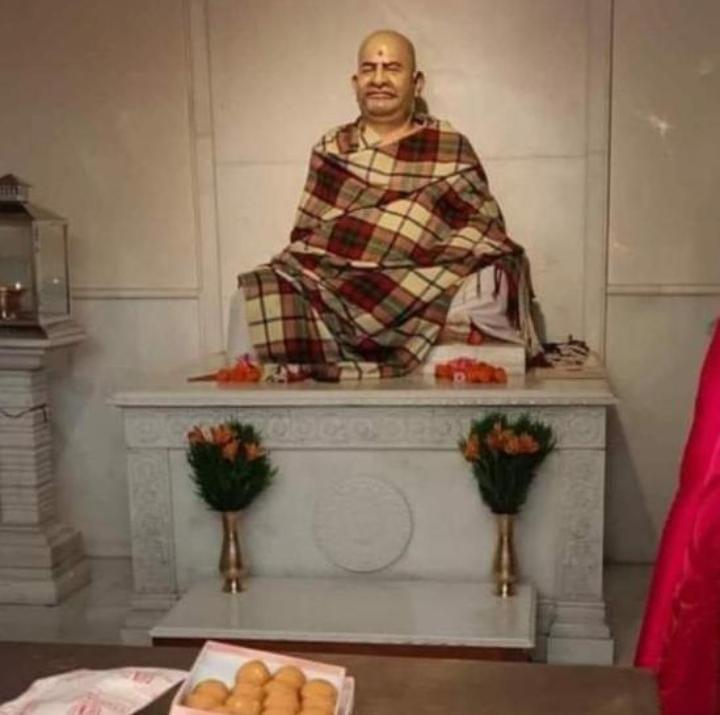
Statue of Neem Karoli Baba at Kainchi Dham

Its name, "Kainchi," which translates to "scissors" in Hindi, is derived from the two sharp hairpin bends in the mountainous road leading to the site, forming a scissor-like shape.

Each year on 15 June a large mela (fair) known as Kainchi Dham Mela is organised to commemorate the foundation day of the temple in 1964. In this fair, thousands of devotees and pilgrims take part.

== History ==
In 1962, Neem Karoli Baba and Poornanand, a resident of Kainchi village, selected a forested site associated with earlier ascetics, including Sombari Baba, who had performed yajnas there. Permission was obtained to clear the site, and a raised platform (chabutara) was constructed on land leased from the Forest Department. An life-size idol of Hanuman was installed on 15 June 1964, and the ashram opened in June that year. The date subsequently became the annual foundation or pratishtha day of Kainchi Dham. Over the next decade, the complex developed progressively rather than as a single building project, and additional images of Lakshmi Narayan, Parvati, Ganesha, Kartikeya and Vindhyavasini Devi were installed, together with a Shiva linga.

Neem Karoli Baba's association with Western spiritual seekers during the 1960s and 1970s contributed to the later international recognition of Kainchi Dham. Among his best-known Western disciples was American psychologist Richard Alpert, who travelled to India in 1967, met Neem Karoli Baba, and was later given the name 'Ram Dass'.

Following the death of Neem Karoli Baba in September 1973, his ashes were installed at Kainchi Dham and a temple, where his life-size statue was consecrated on 15 June 1976.

- Steve Jobs visited India in 1974 with his friend Daniel Kottke to meet the guru Neem Karoli Baba. Although he arrived at the ashram after Baba left their physical body in September 1973, but the trip profoundly influenced Jobs' approach towards simplicity, intuition, and focus.
- Mark Zuckerberg visited in 2008; he revealed that early in Facebook's development, when the company was facing challenges, Steve Jobs advised him to visit the ashram to reconnect with the mission of his company. The disclosure drew renewed international media attention to Kainchi Dham.
- In November 2022, Indian cricketer Virat Kohli and his wife actor Anushka Sharma visited Kainchi Dham with their daughter. Their visit received widespread media attention and increased public interest in Kainchi Dham.

== See also ==
- Hanumangarhi, Nainital
