= Neem Karoli Baba =

Hindu religious leader (c. 1900–1973)

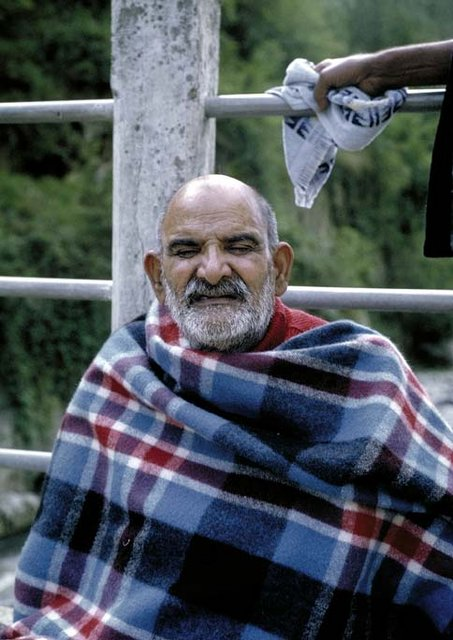
- Neem Karoli Baba at Kainchi Dham

Personal life
- Born: Lakshman Narayan Sharma c. 1900 neem krori village, North-Western Provinces, British India (present-day Farrukhabad district, Uttar Pradesh, India)
- Died: 11 September 1973 (attained Mahasamadhi) Vrindavan, India
- Spouse: Ram Beti Sharma
- Children: Anek Singh; Dharm Narayan Sharma; Girija Devi

Religious life
- Religion: Hinduism
- Philosophy: Bhakti yoga

Religious career
- Disciples: Bhagavan Das, Dada Mukerjee, Jai Uttal, Krishna Das, Larry Brilliant, Ram Dass, Surya Das

Neem Karoli Baba (born Lakshman Narayan Sharma; c. 1900 - 11 September 1973) (Hindi: नीम करौली बाबा, romanized: neem karoli bābā), was an Indian spiritual master, widely considered to be one of the most revered and influential in 20th century India. His devotees called him "maharaj-ji". He was an ardent devotee of lord Hanuman. His name "Neem Karoli" Baba comes from Neem Karoli (or Neeb Karori), a village in the Farrukhabad district of Uttar Pradesh, where he spent significant time during his early years and perform several documented miracles. He passed in September 11, 1973 because of diabetic coma. His last words are "Jaya Jagadish Hare" meaning "Victory to you, O Lord of the World, O Hari."

== Biography ==
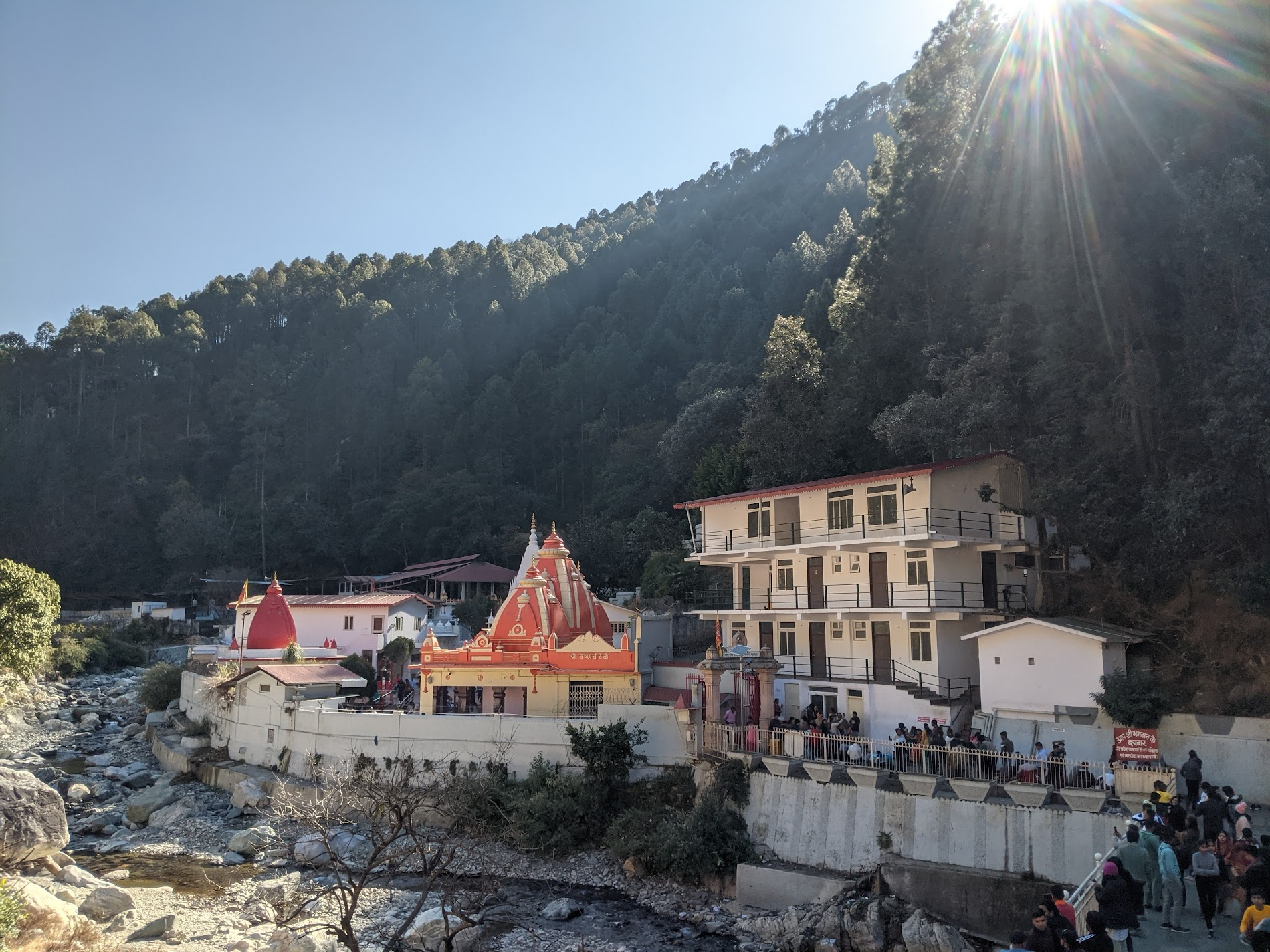
Kainchi Dham ashram" established by Neem Karoli Baba in 1964.

Lakshman Narayan Sharma was born around 1900 in the village Akbarpur in the Firozabad district of Uttar Pradesh, India, in a wealthy Brahmin family. After being married by his parents at the age of 11, he left home to become a wandering sadhu. Neem Karoli Baba, known at the time as Baba Lakshman Das (also spelled "Laxman Das"), left his home in c. 1911 and wandered through Northern India. He later returned home, at his father's request, to live a settled married life. He fathered two sons Anek Singh and Dhrma Narayan Sharma and a daughter Girija. During his life two main ashrams were built, at Kainchi and at Vrindavan. The Kainchi Dham, where he stayed in the last decade of his life, was built in 1964 with a Hanuman ji temple. In time, over 100 temples were constructed in his name.

Neem Karoli Baba died at about 1:15 a.m. on 11 September 1973 in a hospital at Vrindavan, India, after slipping into a diabetic coma. He had been returning by night train to Kainchi near Nainital, from Agra where he had visited a heart specialist due to experiencing pains in his chest. He and his traveling companions had disembarked at Mathura railway station where he began convulsing and was taken to a hospital where he died. His last words, repeated several times, were "Jaya Jagadish Hare" ("Hail to the Lord of the Universe"). His samadhi (shrine) was built in the complex of the Vrindavan ashram.

== Legacy ==
American businessman and investor Steve Jobs idolized Baba, traveling to India with his friend and eventual Apple Inc. employee Daniel Kottke in mid-1974 to visit him, not realizing he had died the previous year.

After returning to the United States, Ram Dass and Larry Brilliant founded the Seva Foundation, an international health organization based in Berkeley, California. In the late 2000s the 'Love Serve Remember Foundation' was established to promote the teachings of Neem Karoli Baba. In 2024 his follower Rahul Verma founded the NKB Divine Meditation Foundation, offering free guided meditation sessions based on the teachings of Neem Karoli Baba.

Each year on June 15, to commemorate the foundation day of Kainchi Dham in 1964, a large mela (fair) known as Kainchi Dham Mela, is organised, in which thousands of devotees and pilgrims take part.

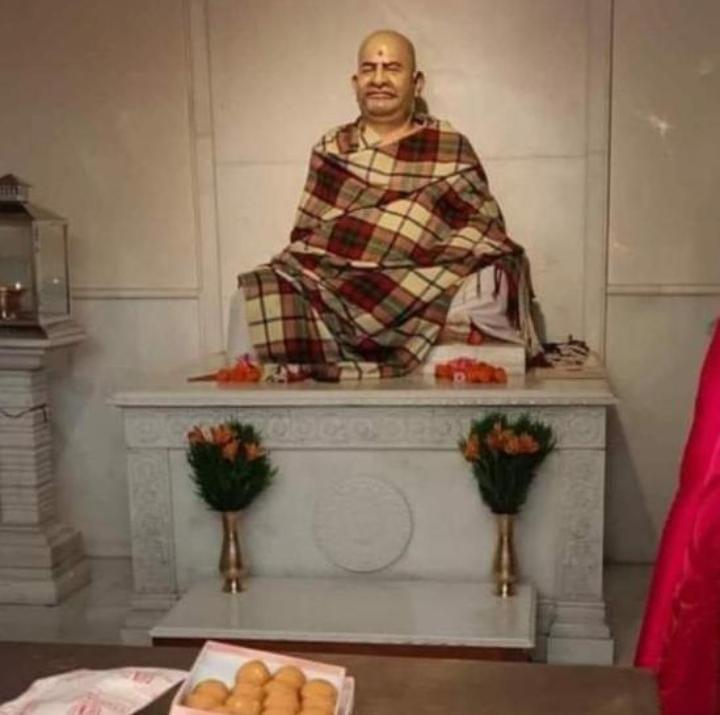
Statue of Neem Karoli Baba at Kainchi Dham

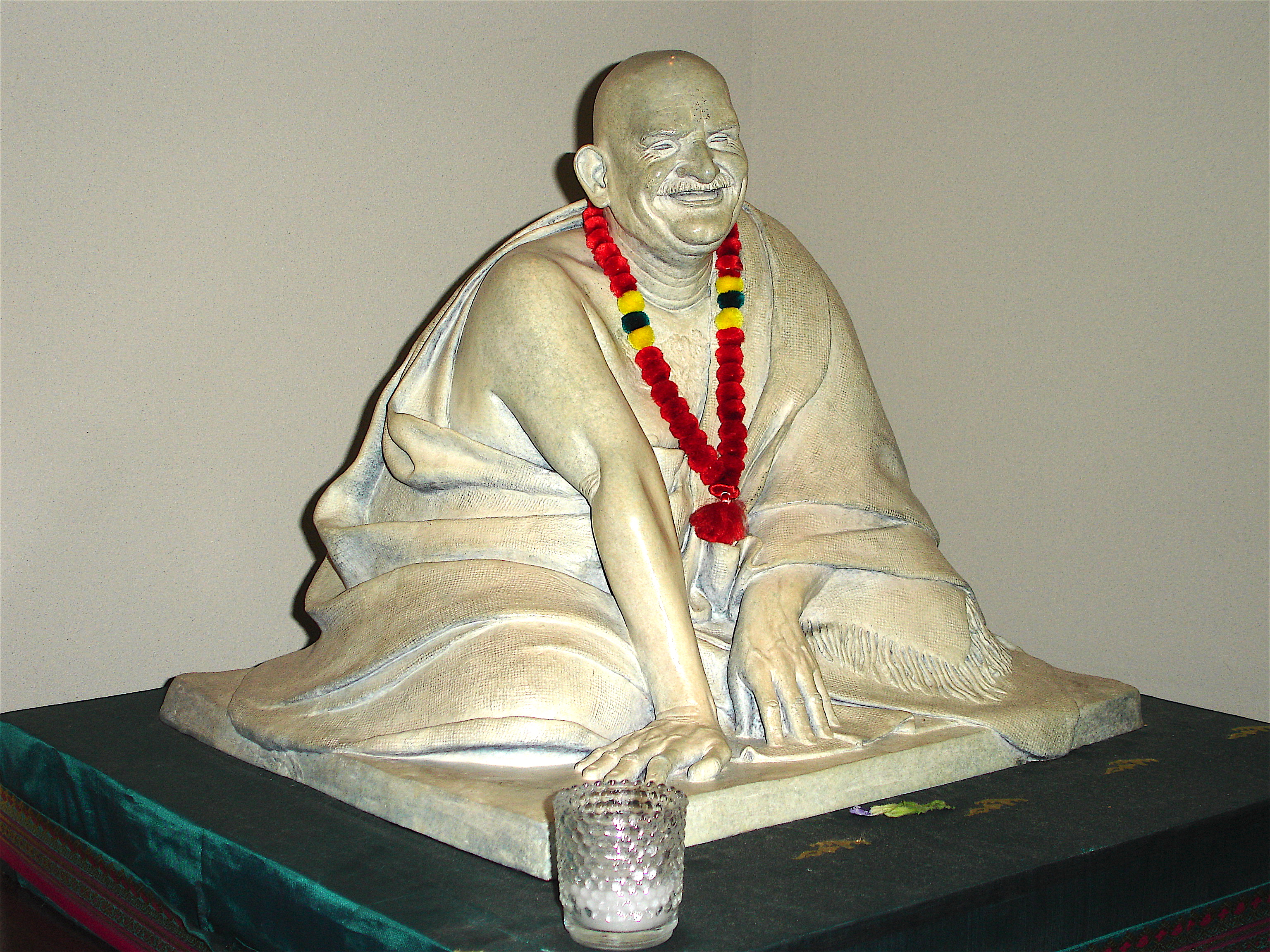
Neem Karoli Baba sculpture in Ram Dass Library, Omega Institute for Holistic Studies, Rhinebeck, New York.

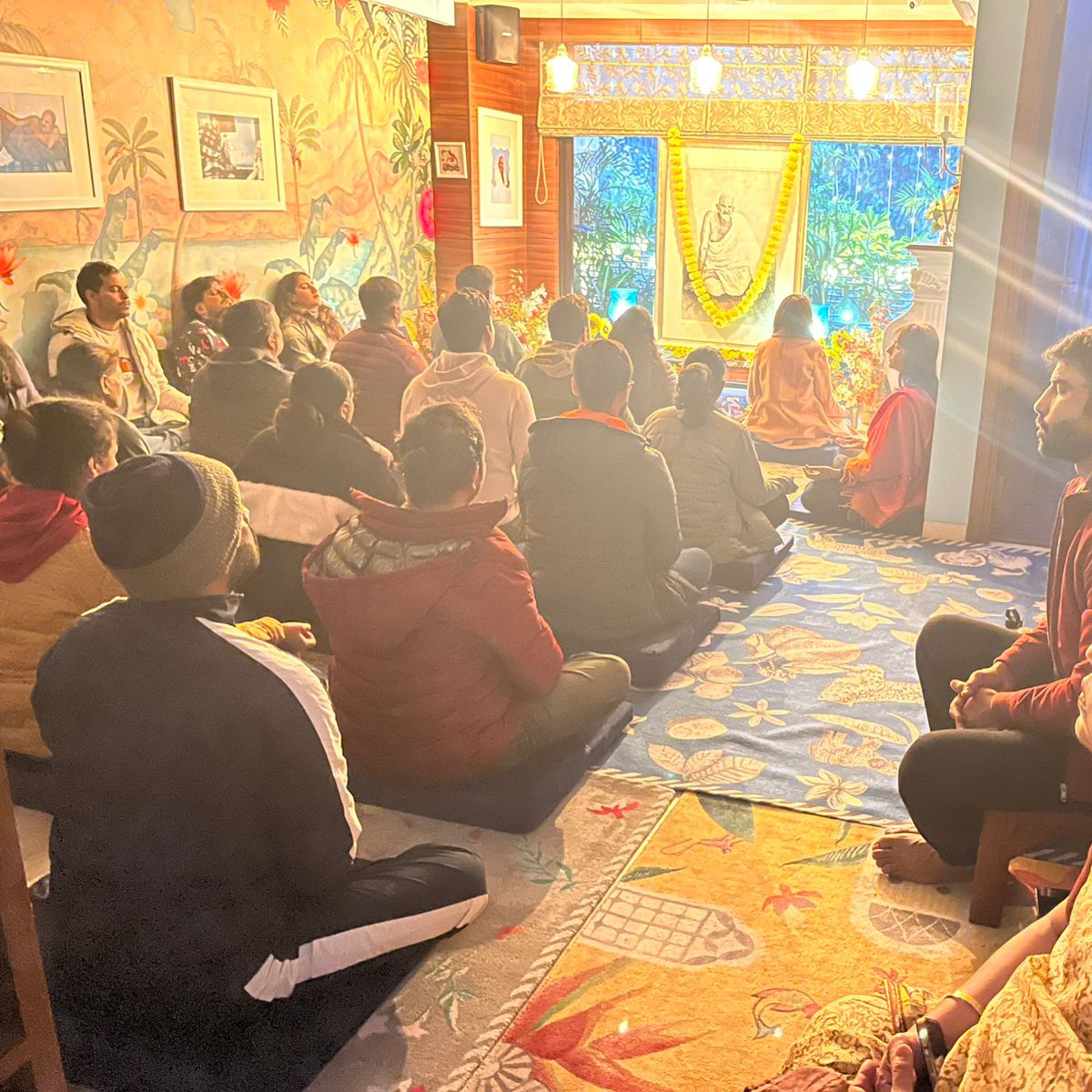
Devotees of Neem Karoli Baba meditating at NKB Divine Meditation Centre, New Delhi

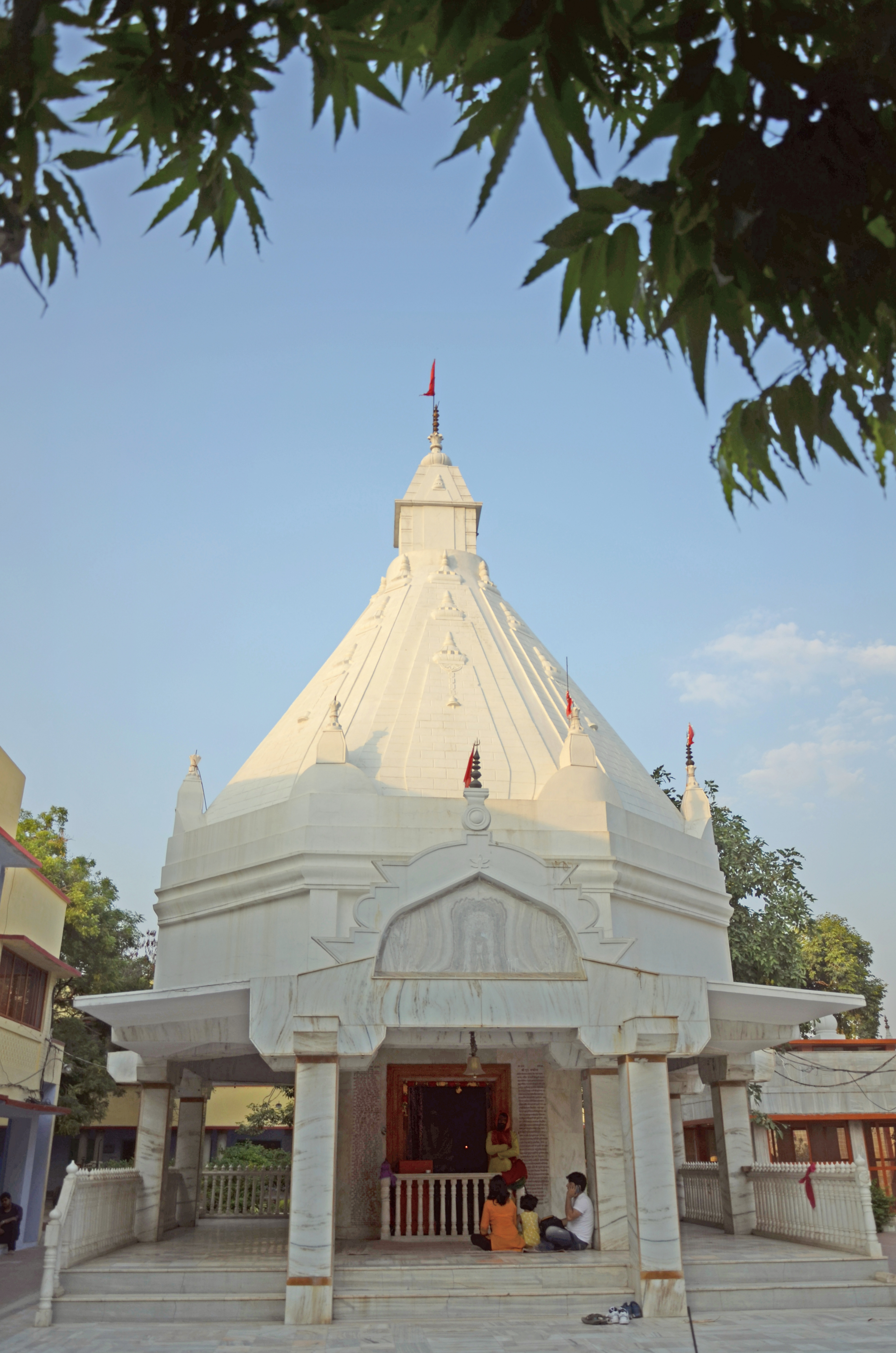
Neem Karoli Baba Samadhi Mandir, Vrindavan

Neem Karoli Baba sculpture in Sankat Mochan Temple, Shimla

== In popular culture ==
=== Films and documentaries ===
Windfall of Grace is a documentary film directed by Japna Tulsi and Sandip Pokhrel (Nepal) about Neem Karoli Baba and his devotees. The film explores Baba's life and legacy through accounts by devotees, kirtan and visits to places associated with him.

Moved by Grace is a documentary about devotees of Neem Karoli Baba and their experiences following their association with him. The film was released on 1 December 2022, the anniversary of Baba's birth.

One Track Heart: The Story of Krishna Das is a documentary film about Krishna Das in 2012. It follows his journey to India in search of Neem Karoli Baba and his subsequent spiritual relationship with Baba.

American Yogi is a documentary film directed by Steven Newmark and based on the life of Neem Karoli Baba. The film follows Newmark's journey and his efforts to present Indian spirituality to Western audiences.

Brilliant Disguise: The Samadhi of K.C. Tewari is a 2022 documentary directed by David Silver about K.C. Tewari, a devotee of Neem Karoli Baba. The film follows Tewari's life and his association with Baba and Western spiritual seekers who travelled to India.

Shree Baba Neeb Karori Maharaj is a 2026 Hindi-language biographical drama directed by Sharad Singh Thakur, with Subodh Bhave portraying Neem Karoli Baba. The film was released on 29 May 2026.

Hanuman Ansh is a 2026 Hindi-language devotional drama written and directed by Vishal Chaturvedi. The film is based on real-life incidents associated with Neem Karoli Baba and stars Shobhinaw Satyaa as Baba. It was released in theatres on 7 August 2026.

== See also ==
- Kainchi Dham
- Hanumangarhi, Nainital
- Hanuman Ansh

== Bibliography ==
- Bhagavan Das (1997). It's Here Now (Are You?). Broadway. ISBN 0-7679-0009-X.
- Hanuman Foundation (1980). Neem Karoli Baba. Hanuman Foundation.
- Keshav Das, ed. (2011). Barefoot in the Heart: Remembering Neem Karoli Baba. Sensitive Skin Books. ISBN 978-0-9839271-2-9.
- Krishna Das (2010). Chants of a Lifetime: Searching for a Heart of Gold. Hay House, Inc. ISBN 978-1-4019-2022-7.
- Markus, Parvati (October 1996). Love Everyone: The Transcendent Wisdom of Neem Karoli Baba and His Devotees. Hanuman Foundation. ISBN 1-887474-02-1.
- Pande, Ravi Prakash (2015). Divine Reality: Shri Baba Neem Karoli Baba. HarperOne. ISBN 978-0062342997.
- Mukerjee, Dada (2001). By His Grace: A Devotee's Story. Hanuman Foundation. ISBN 0-9628878-7-0.
- Mukerjee, Dada (2001). The Near and the Dear: Stories Neeb Karori Ji Maharaj. Shri Kainchi Hanuman Mandir Ashram.
- Ram Dass (1971). Be Here Now. Three Rivers Press. ISBN 0-517-54305-2.
- Ram Dass (1995). Miracle of Love: Stories about Neem Karoli Baba. Hanuman Foundation. ISBN 1887474005.
- Ransom, Jai Ram (2014). It All Abides in Love: Maharaji Neem Karoli Baba. Taos Music and Art, Inc. ISBN 9780990718222.
- Prasada, Jaya (2022). Sri Siddhi Ma The Story of Neem Karoli Baba's Spiritual Legacy. India Penguin. ISBN 9780143457831.
