= Attacus wardi =

Scientific classification
- Kingdom: Animalia
- Phylum: Arthropoda
- Clade: Pancrustacea
- Class: Insecta
- Order: Lepidoptera
- Family: Saturniidae
- Genus: Attacus
- Species: A. wardi

Binomial name
- Attacus wardi W. Rothschild, 1910

Species of moth

Attacus wardi is a moth from the family Saturniidae endemic to Northern Territory, Australia, historically classified as a subspecies of Attacus dohertyi.

== Description ==
The wingspan of Attacus wardi is approximately 17–22 cm; fairly large for a moth, but still the smallest species in its genus. It is brown with two white bands and a large, white spot on each wing.

== Distribution and habitat ==
Attacus wardi is known only from Darwin, Black Point Cobourg Peninsula and Melville Island. The species is restricted to coastal monsoon-rainforest.
