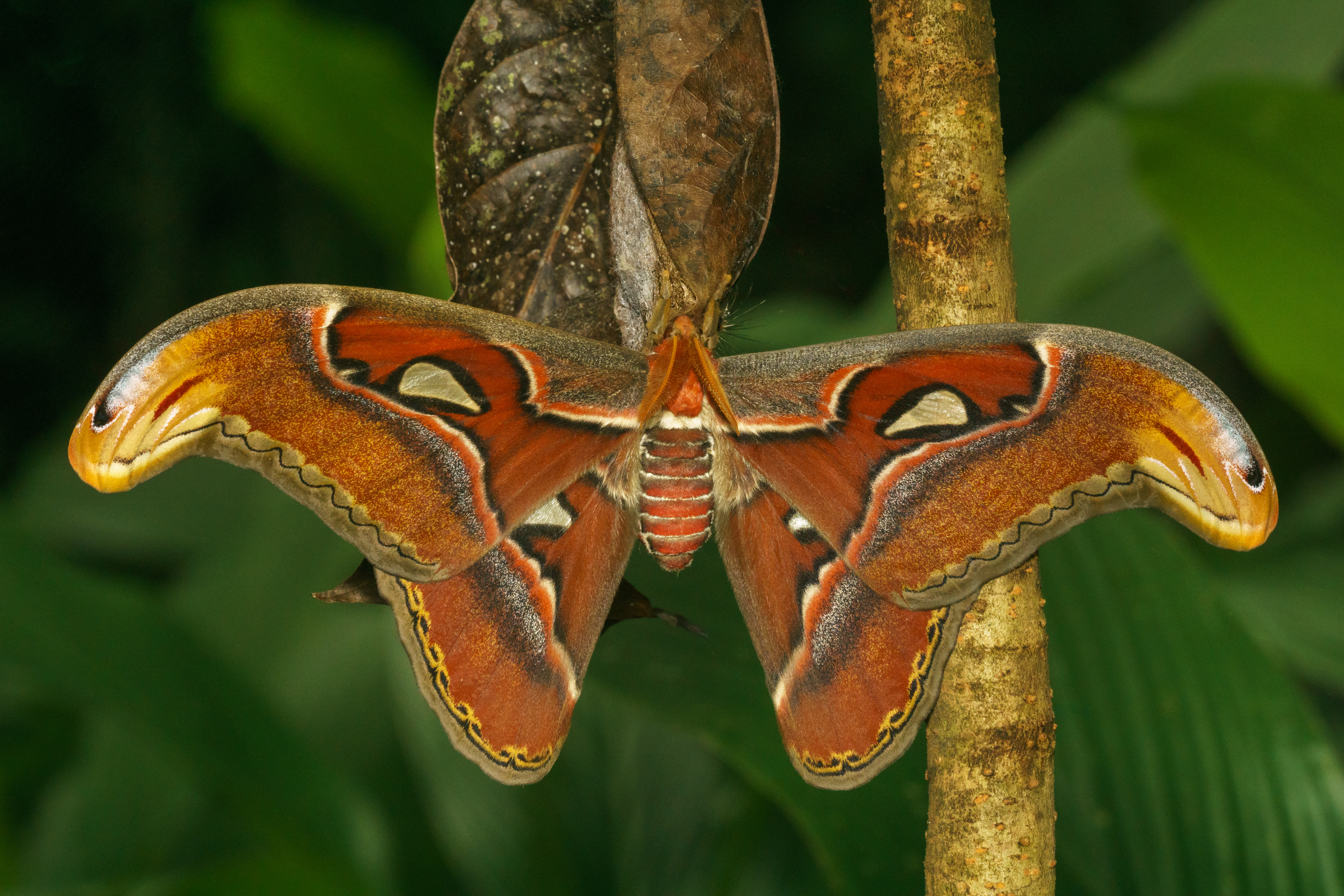
- Male

Scientific classification
- Domain: Eukaryota
- Kingdom: Animalia
- Phylum: Arthropoda
- Class: Insecta
- Order: Lepidoptera
- Family: Saturniidae
- Genus: Attacus
- Species: A. taprobanis

Binomial name
- Attacus taprobanis Moore, 1882

= Attacus taprobanis =

Species of moth

Attacus taprobanis is a moth of family Saturniidae. It is native to southern India and Sri Lanka. This species is very similar in morphology to the much more widely distributed Attacus atlas. It was once considered a subspecies of A. atlas.

== Description ==
Attacus taprobanis is typically darker than A. atlas. The hyaline spots are slightly smaller. The hyaline streak on the forewing is smaller, and often absent in males. The wingspan about 170–220 mm, is probably the second largest after A. atlas.

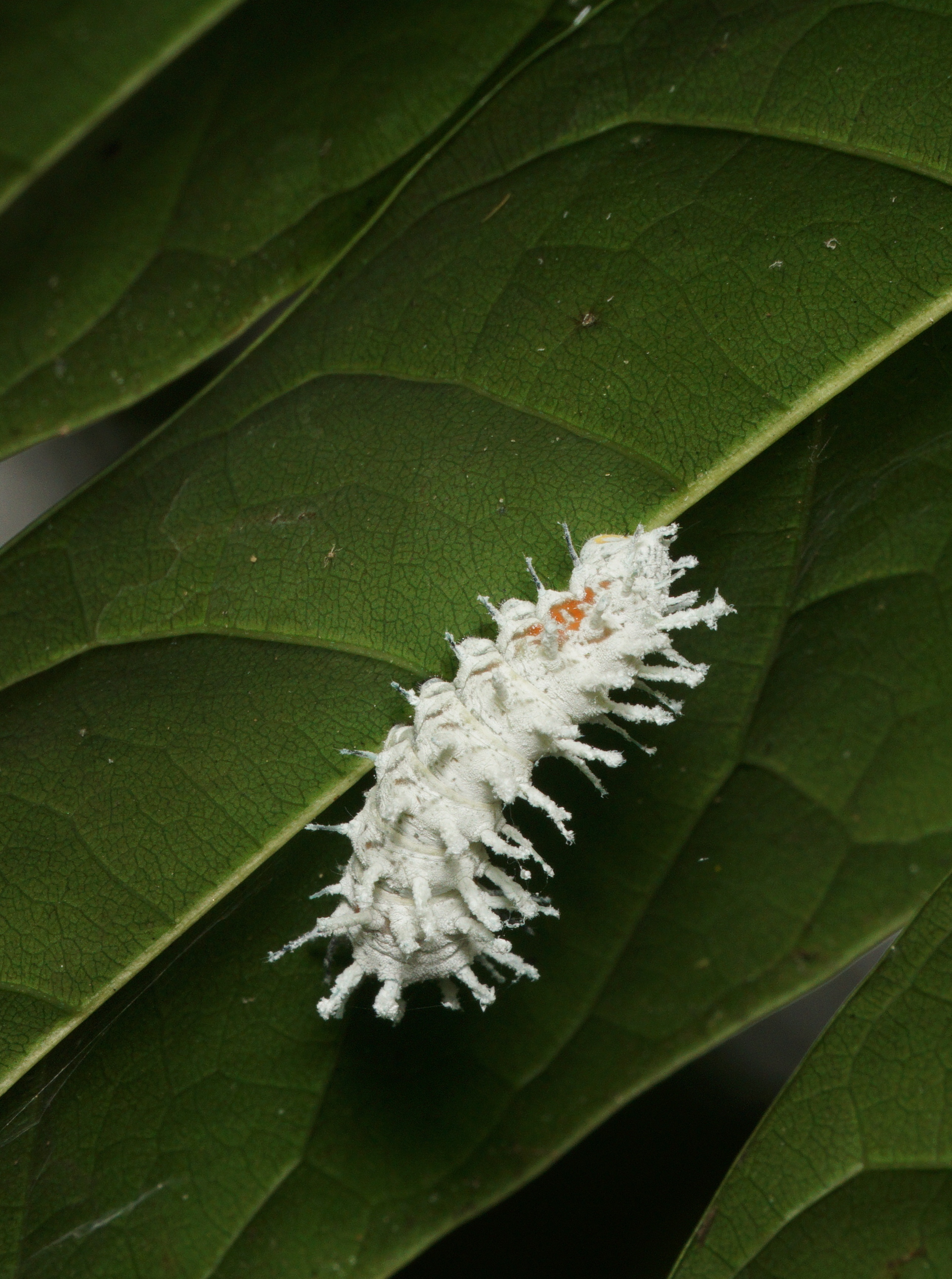
Larva (early instar)

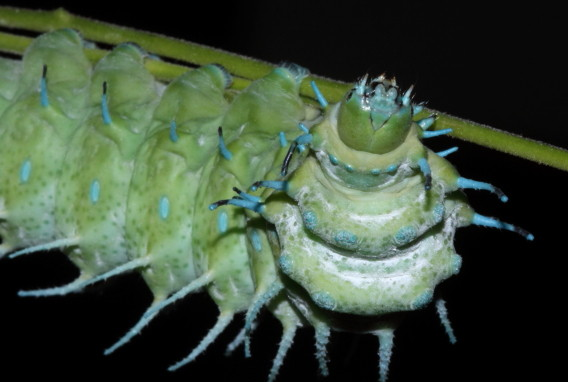
Larva (head)

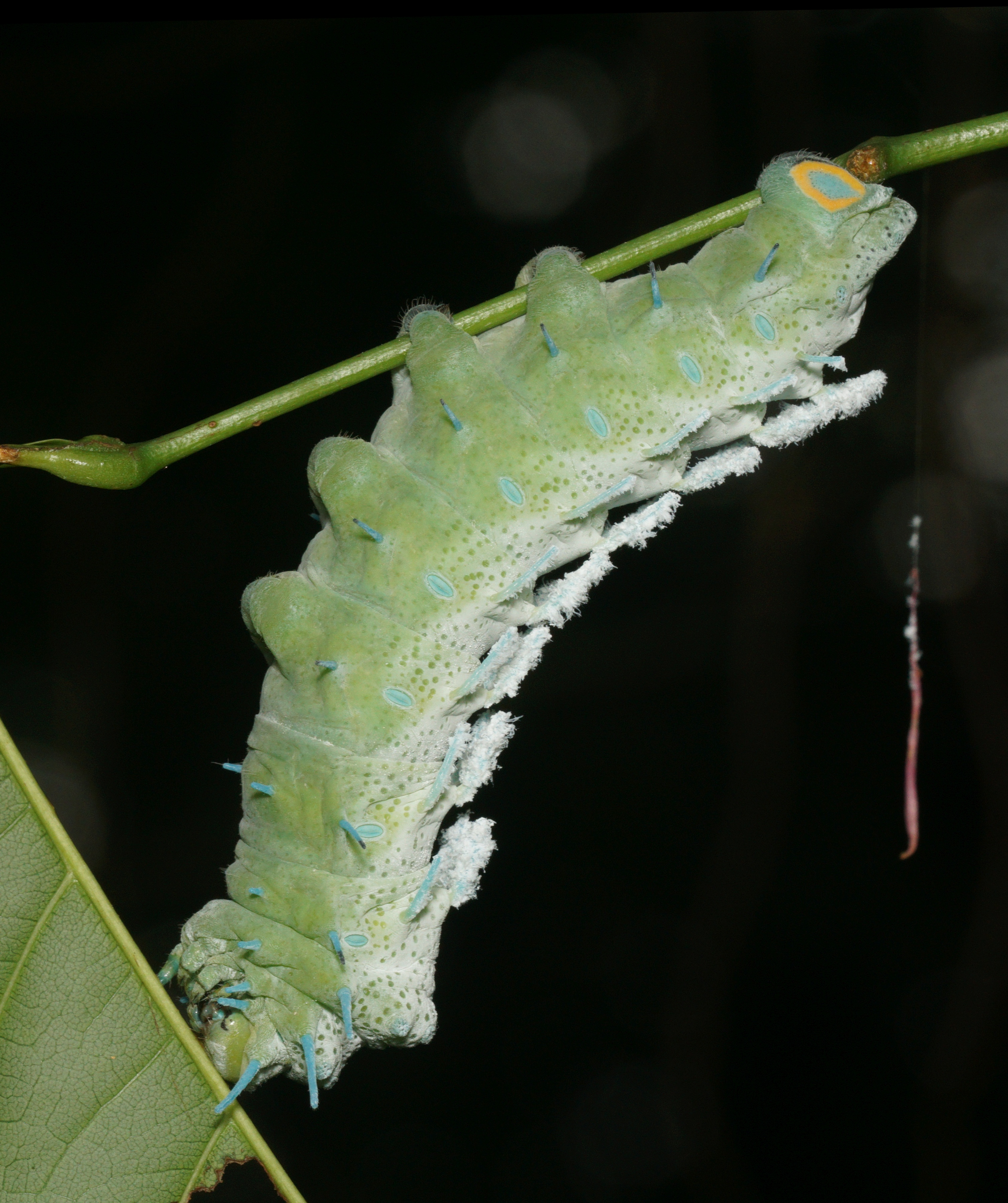
Larva

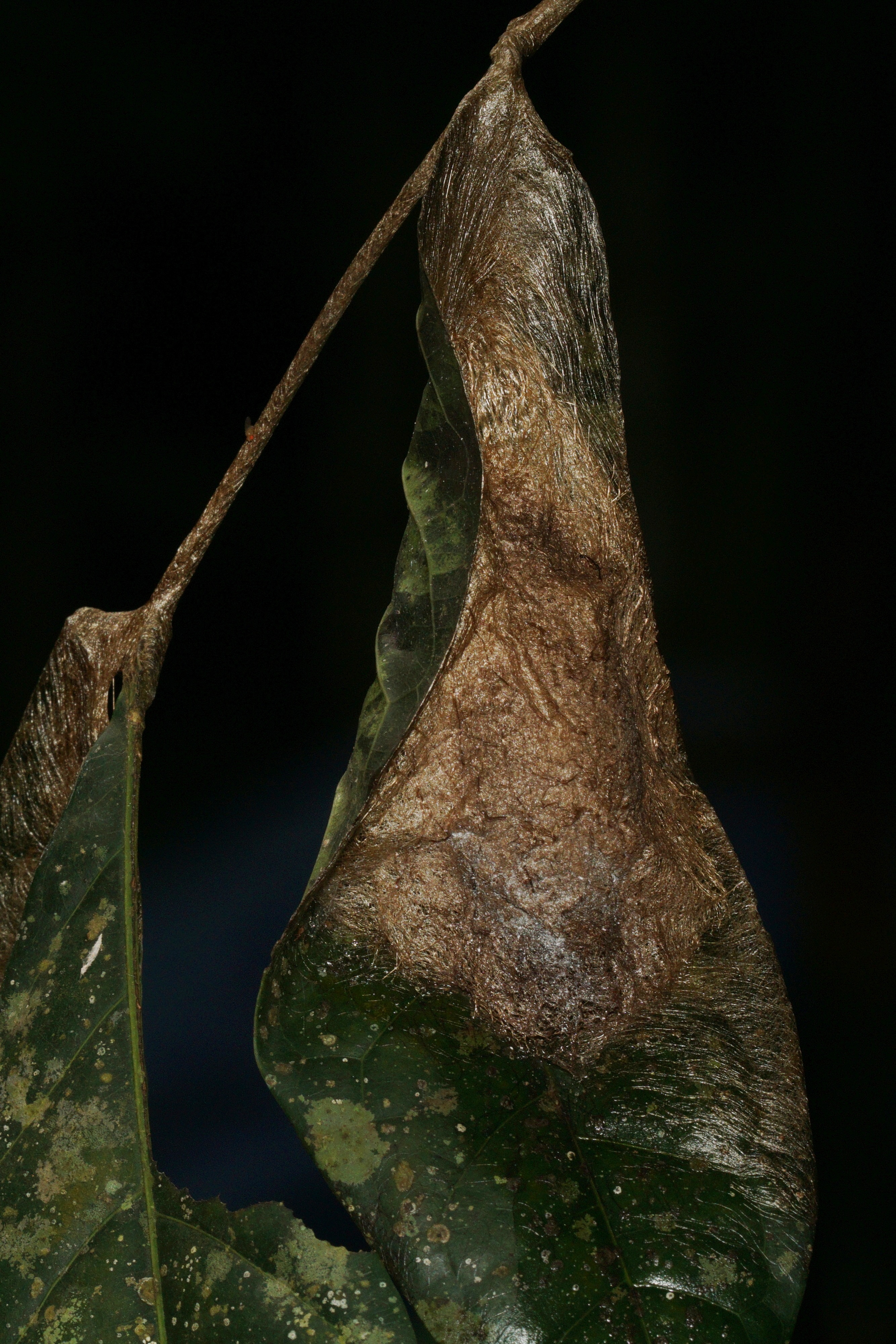
Cocoon

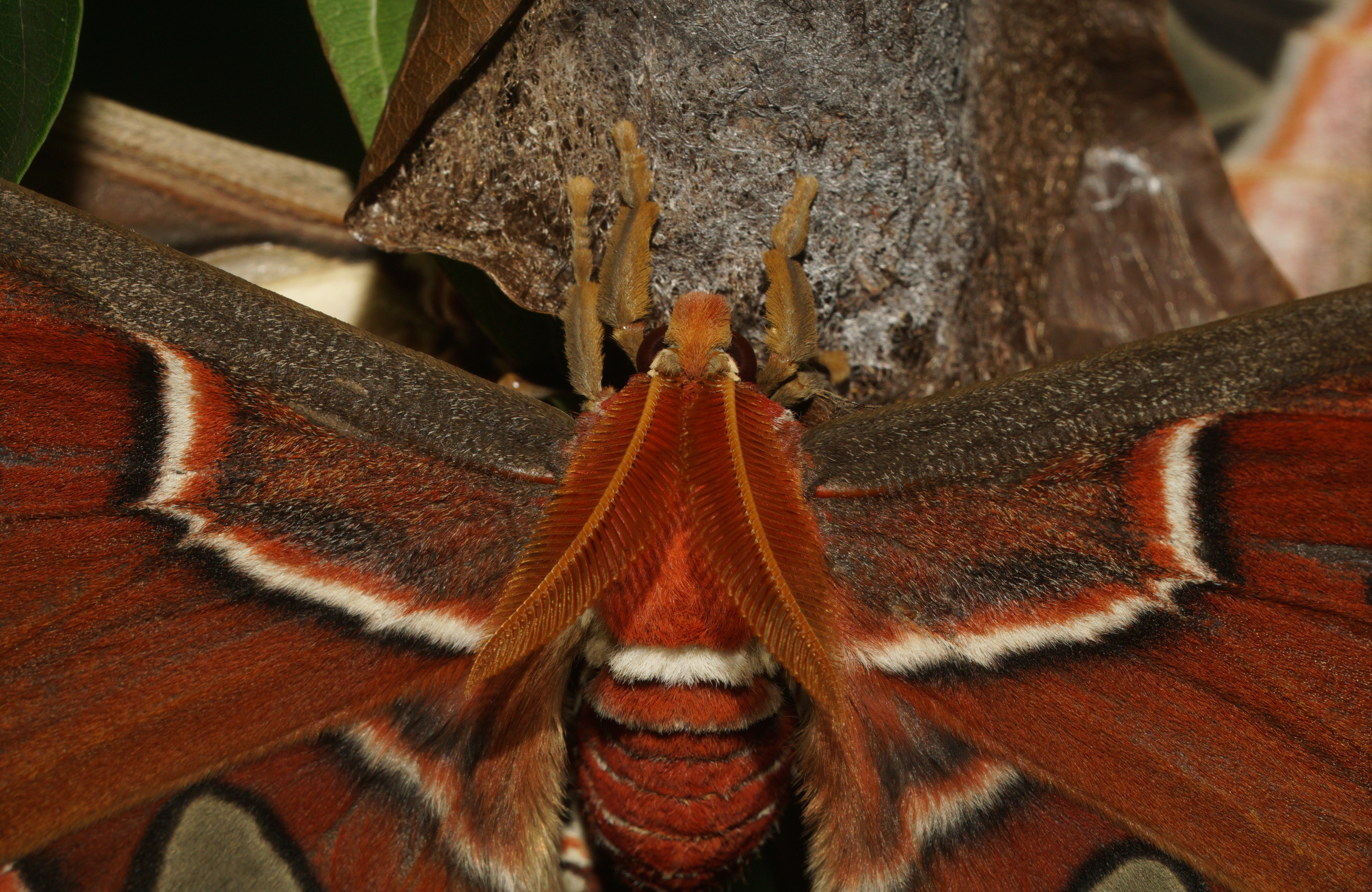
Imago (head)

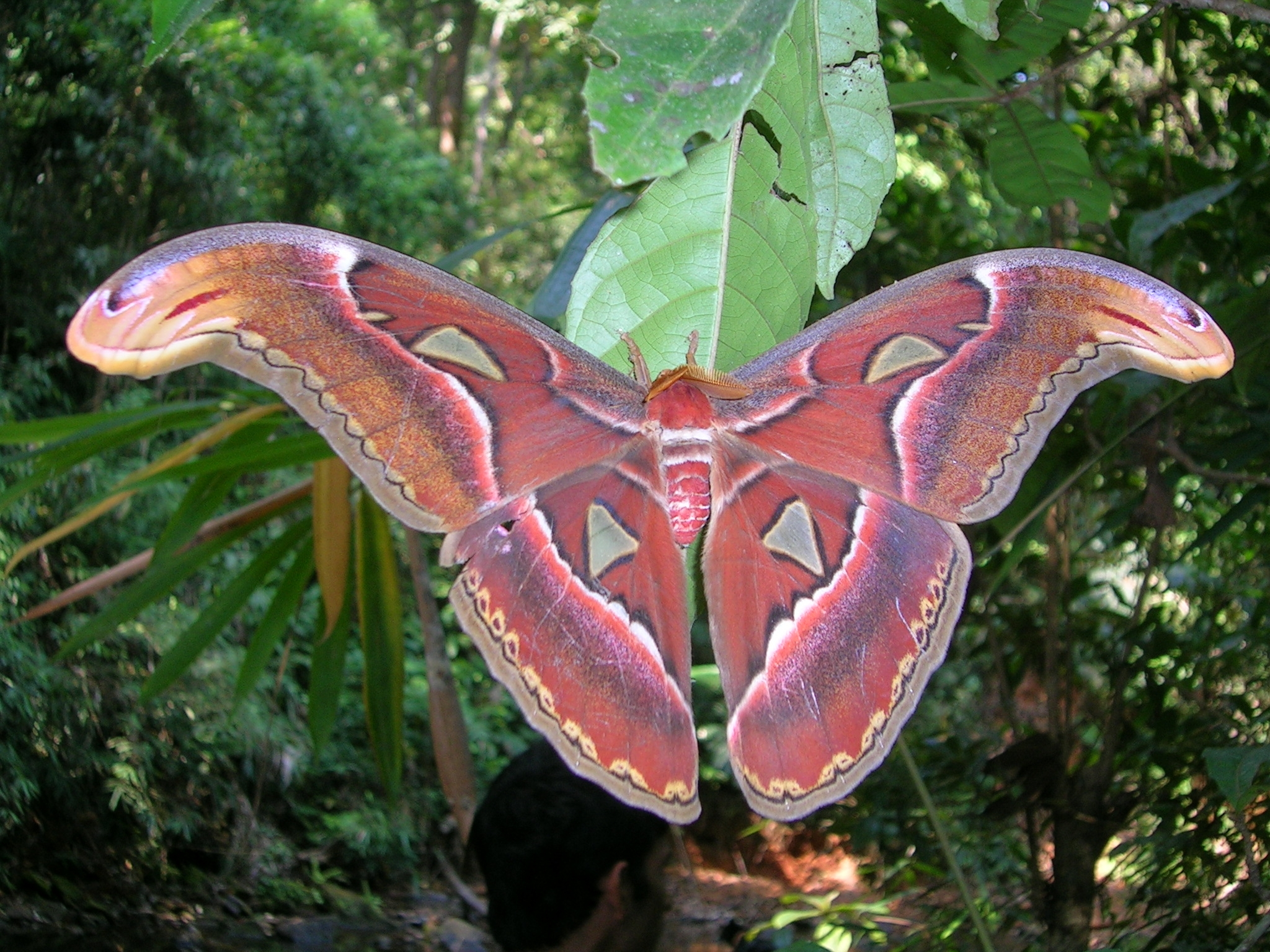
Imago (male)

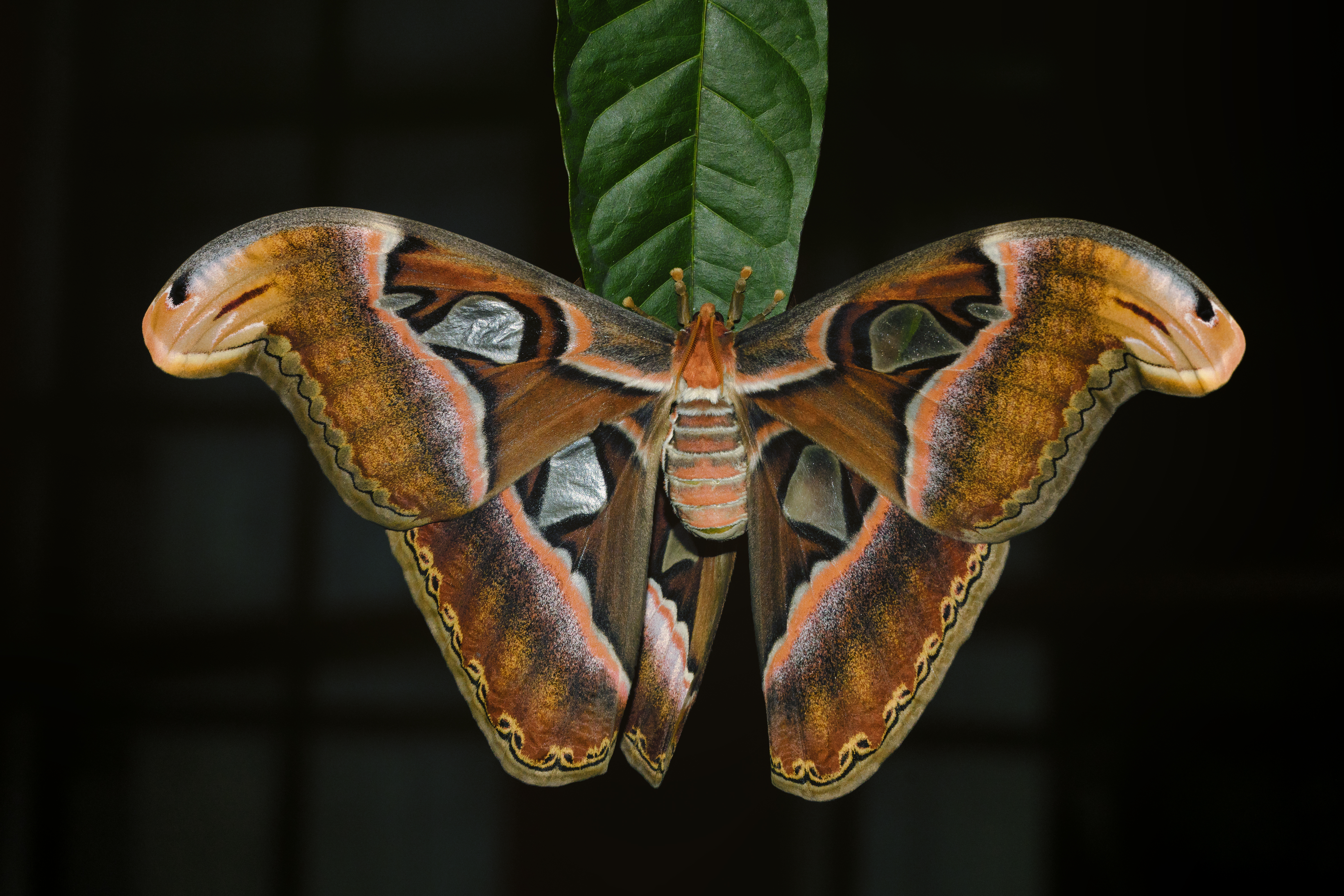
Imago (female)

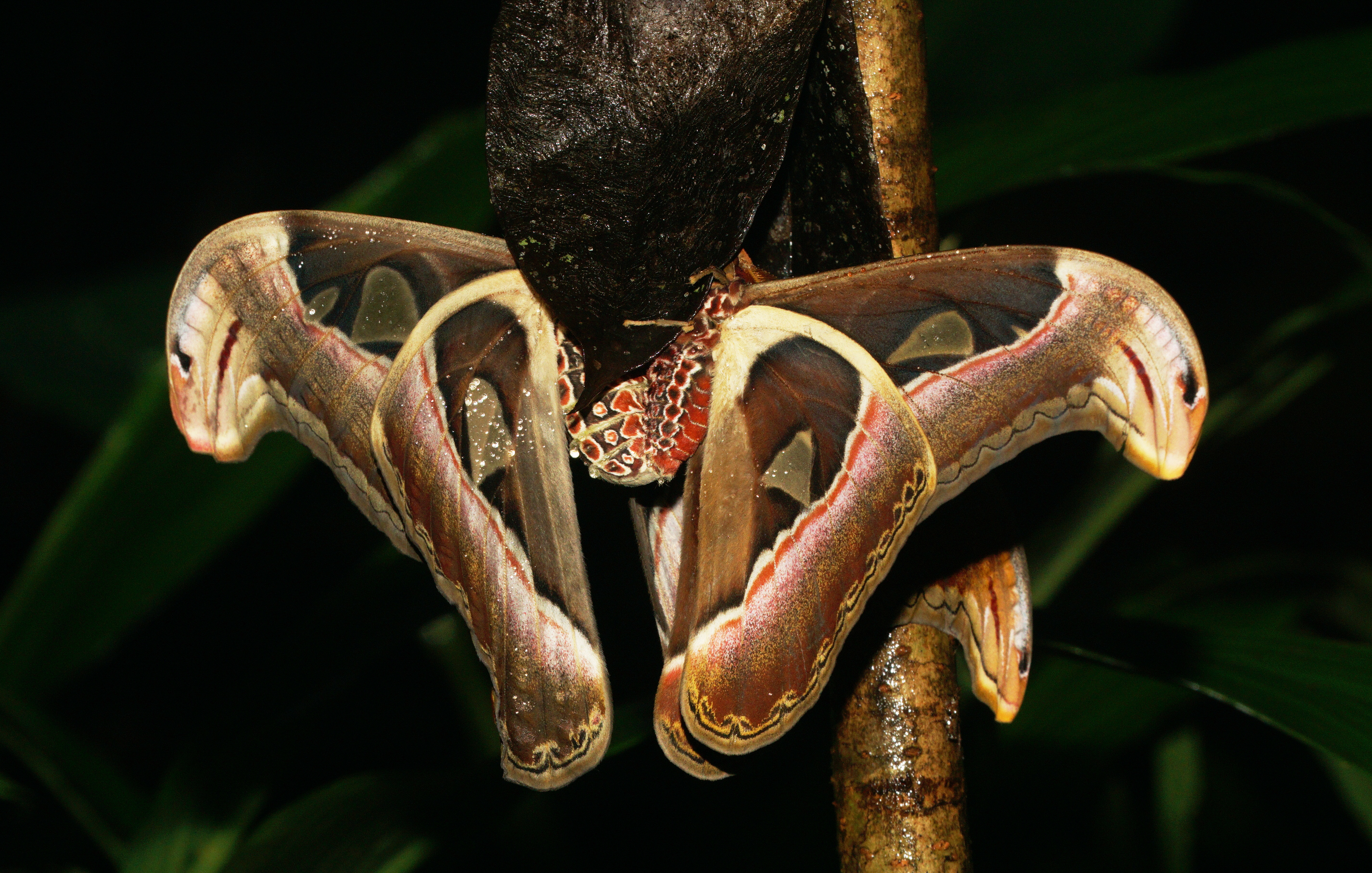
Mating pair

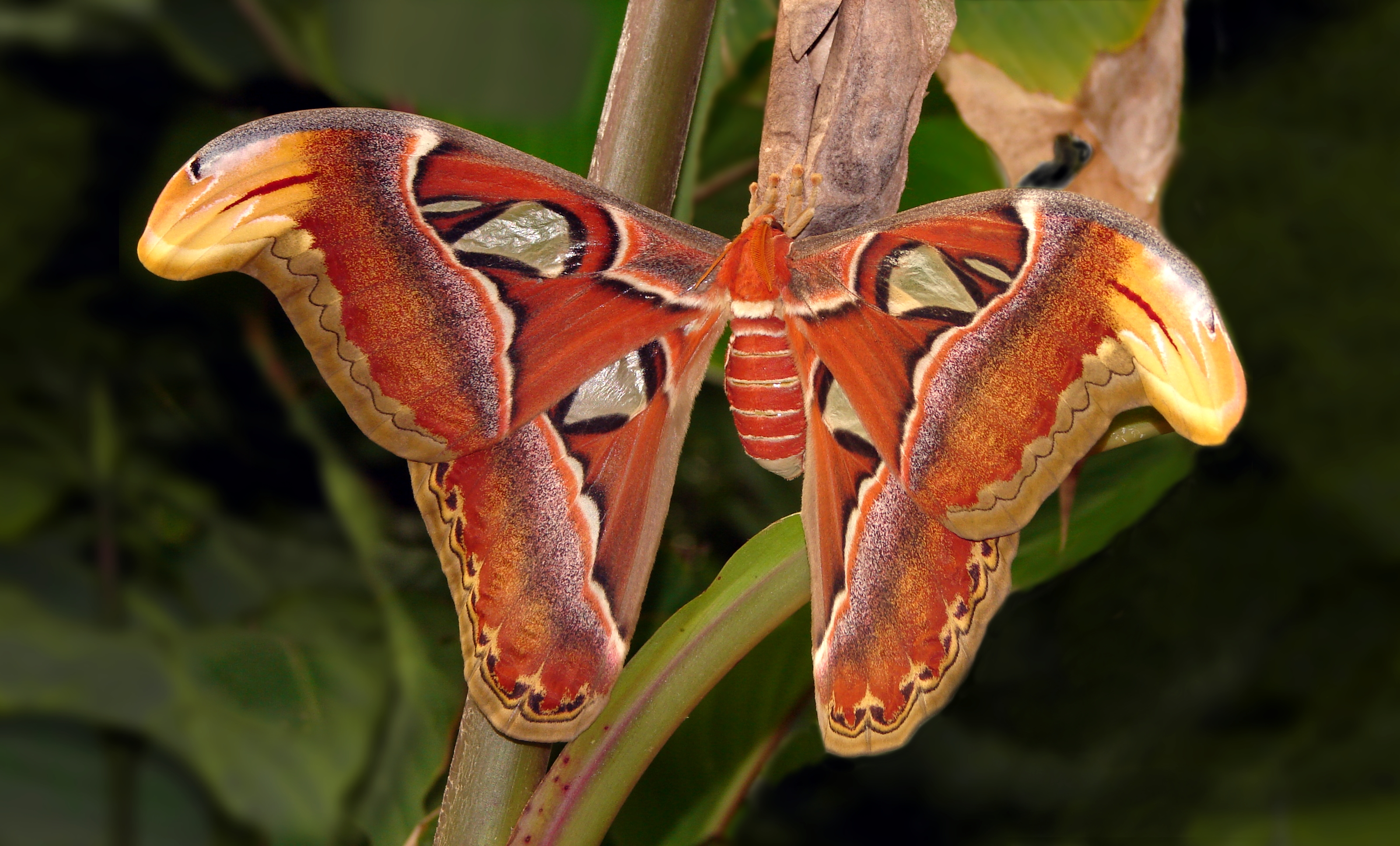
Attacus atlas, another similar species

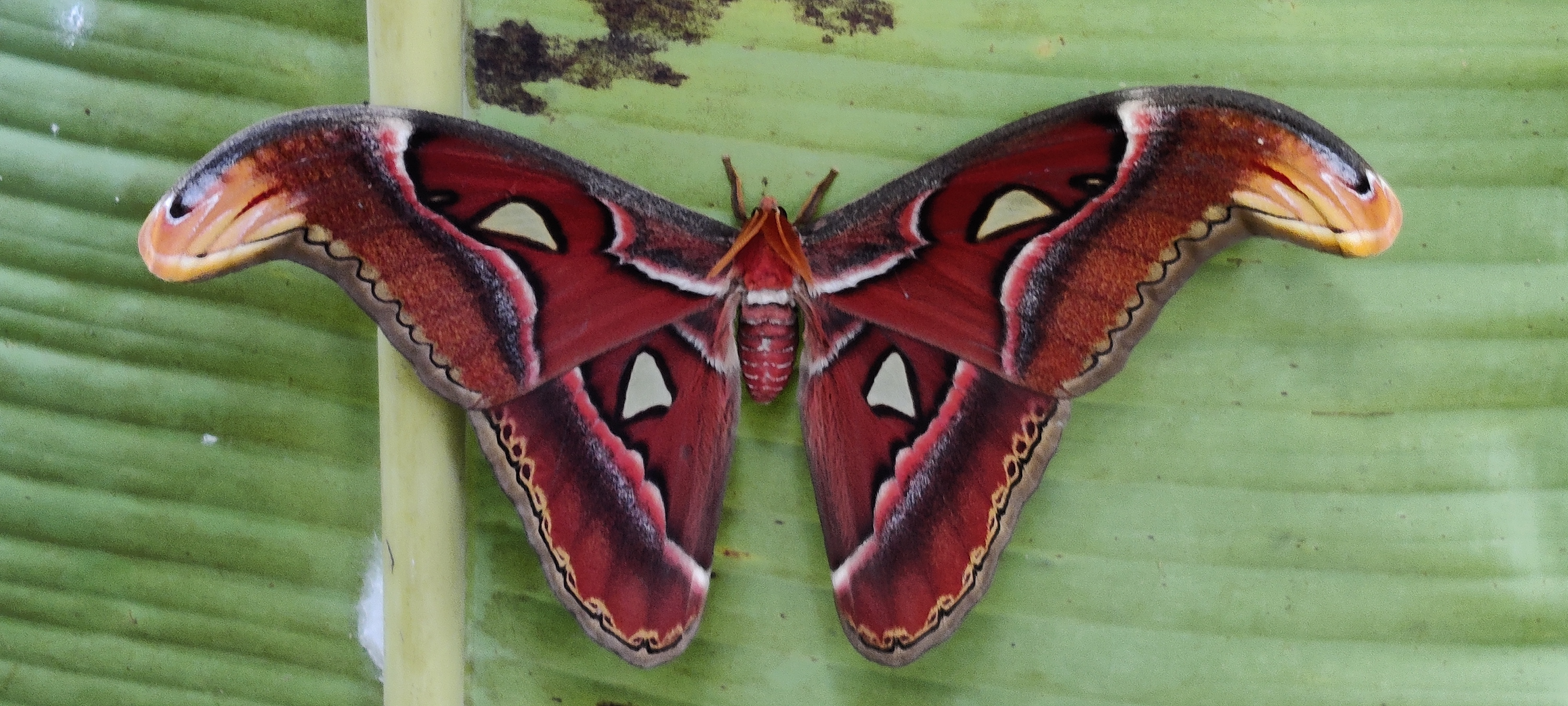

== Ecology ==
The larvae feed on various bushes and trees including Aglaia roxburghiana, Berberis asiatica, Berberis thunbergii, Berberis vulgaris, Cinnamomum, Cinnamomum camphora, Cinnamomum zeylanicum and Ligustrum. Adult moths do not take foods and survive on fat they have stored from their larval period, the females sitting most calm and emitting pheromones, that the active males can notice from a distance.
