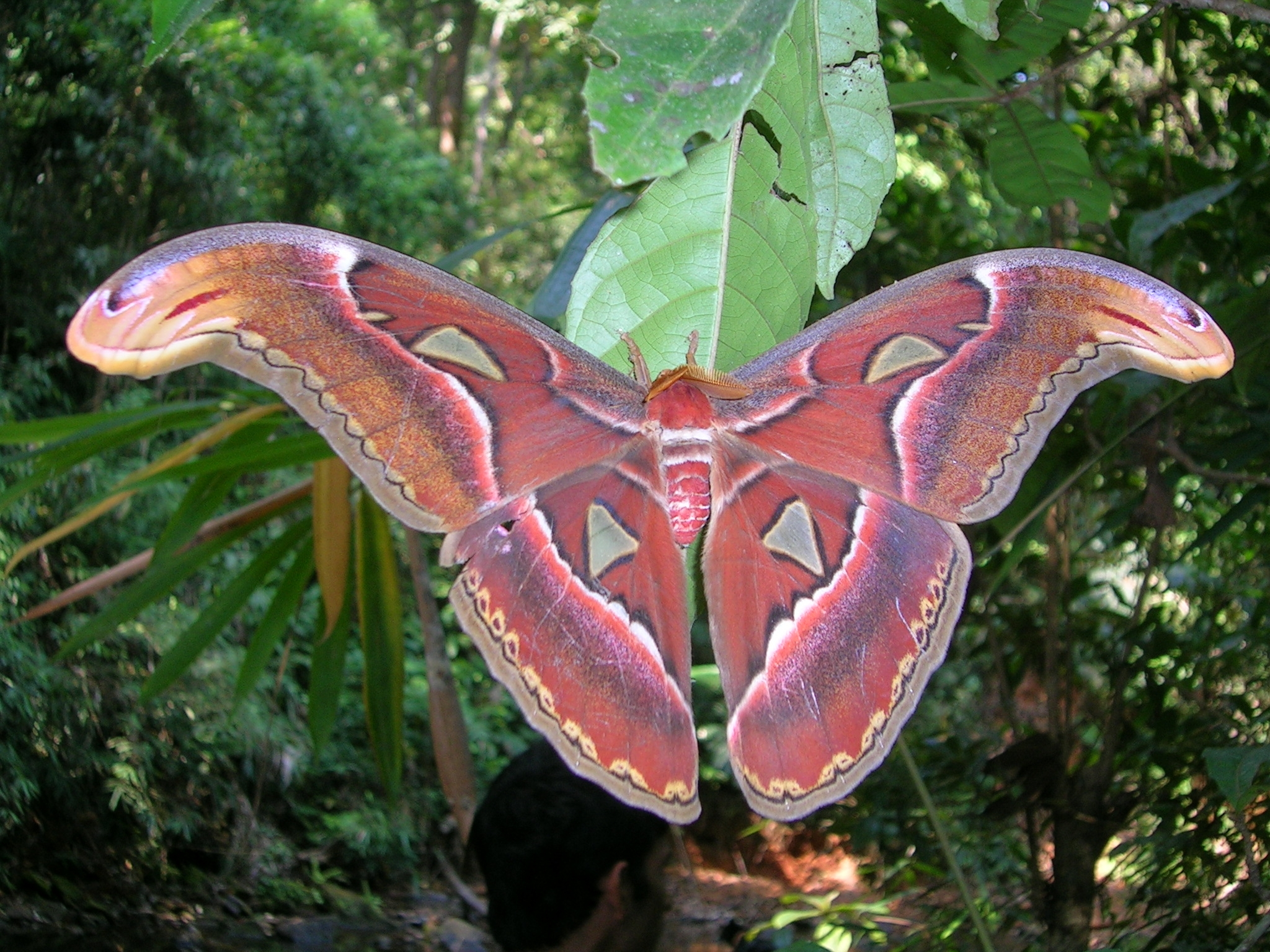
- Attacus taprobanis from the Western Ghats of India

Scientific classification
- Kingdom: Animalia
- Phylum: Arthropoda
- Clade: Pancrustacea
- Class: Insecta
- Order: Lepidoptera
- Family: Saturniidae
- Tribe: Attacini
- Genus: Attacus; Linnaeus, 1767

Synonyms
- Arcuata Perry, 1811

= Attacus =

Genus of moths

Attacus is a genus of moths in the family Saturniidae. The genus was named by Carl Linnaeus in his 1767 12th edition of Systema Naturae.

The genus contains the Atlas moth (Attacus atlas), and Attacus caesar, the second and third largest known moths (in terms of wingspan), though different sources treat one or the other as slightly larger. Both are outclassed by the largest, (in terms of wingspan) moths, Thysania agrippina, also known as the White Witch Moth.

Like other saturniid moths, adults lack a fully formed digestive tract and do not feed.

== Natural habitat ==
The moth's preferred habitat is primary forest and the forested lowlands around the vicinity of their hostplants. They are polyphagous and feed on members of the citrus family, Cinnamomum, Salix, Annona, Clerodendrum, Ligustrum, Ailanthus, Prunus, Syringa and Mussaenda.

== Life cycle ==
Their life cycle is similar to any other Lepidoptera, with four life stages: egg, larvae, pupa, and adult. In the wet season, where host plants are in full flush, they start from eggs laid by the adult female moth, they hatch after about three weeks. At the first instar, they are just millimeters long, but quickly grow to 4-5 inches in length by their final instar. Once they reach the fifth and final instar, they start preparing to pupate. During this stage, their fleshy spines shrink some and they start to lose the ability to walk. They spin a silk cocoon around themselves, then molt for the final time. This protects them and keeps a slightly humid microclimate around them at all times, vital to the pupa's survival. This is because they 'overwinter' in the dry season, which would otherwise desiccate the hapless pupa. It molts for the last time, and turns into a large brown pupa. In this state, it will take approximately 1.5-2 months to emerge as a full grown adult. Then it will fly off into the jungle, to find a mate, breed, then die.

== Mimicry and appearance ==
Adult moths are predominantly anywhere from cinnabar red to brick red, some even going into deep crimson red. The wingtips of many species mimic the head of a snake, and when threatened the moths will drop to the ground and slowly shake their wings, revealing the "snake head" and hopefully scaring would be predators away. They also have small transparent 'windows' in the middle of their wings.

Their caterpillars are pale green, fleshy, and have large wax covered spines. Younger instars are nearly mint colored, adorned with small blue flecks. As they grow, they become more solidly colored and lose their blue coloring, except on their prolegs and feet.

== Species ==
- Attacus atlas (Linnaeus, 1758) (Oriental region) – Atlas moth
- Attacus aurantiacus W. Rothschild, 1895 (Kai Archipelago)
- Attacus caesar Maassen, 1873 (Philippines)
- Attacus crameri C. Felder, 1861 (Buru, Seram, Ambon)
- Attacus dohertyi W. Rothschild, 1895 (Sumba, Timor, Roma, and Damar)
- Attacus erebus Fruhstorfer, 1904 (Sulawesi)
- Attacus inopinatus Jurriaanse & Lindemans, 1920 (Sumbawa, Flores)
- Attacus intermedius Jurriaanse & Lindemans, 1920 (Tanimbar Archipelago, Babar Archipelago)
- Attacus lemairei Peigler, 1985 (Palawan)
- Attacus lorquinii C. & R. Felder, 1861 (Philippines)
- Attacus mcmulleni Watson, 1914 (Andamans)
- Attacus paraliae Peigler, 1985 (Banggai Archipelago, Sula Archipelago)
- Attacus paukstadtorum Brechlin, 2010 (Lombok)
- Attacus philippina Bouvier, 1930 (Philippines)
- Attacus selayarensis Naumann & Peigler, 2010 (Selayar)
- Attacus siriae Brechlin & van Schayck, 2016 (Buru)
- Attacus suparmani U. & L. Paukstadt, 2002 (Alor)
- Attacus taprobanis Moore, 1882 (Sri Lanka, southwestern India)
- Attacus wardi W. Rothschild, 1910 (northern Australia)

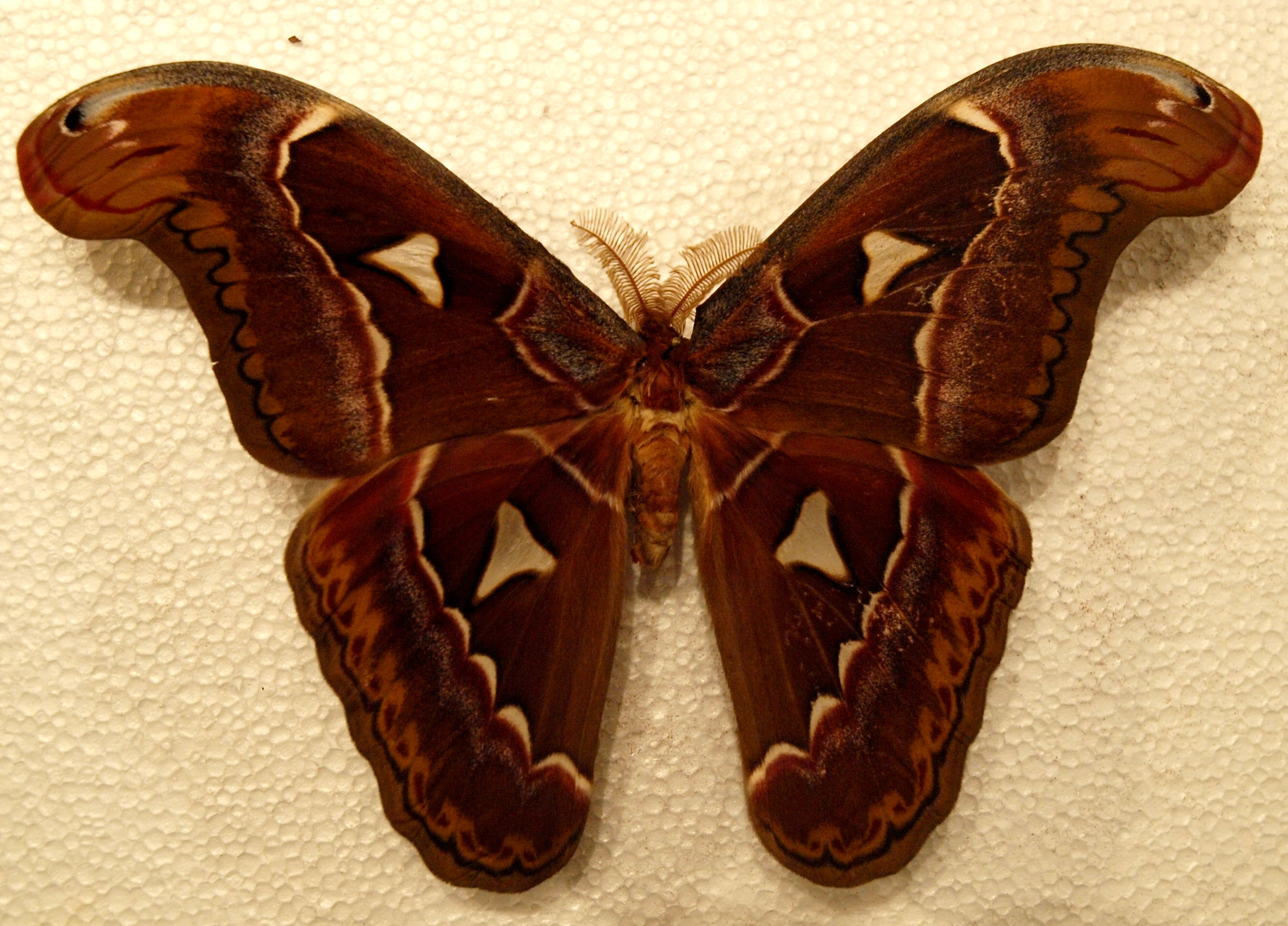
A male Attacus dohertyi from Timor

== See also ==
- List of largest insects (lists of major insect scales and their different aspects of sizes)
- Attacus atlas (genus of moths)
- Morpho menelaus (genus of butterflies)
