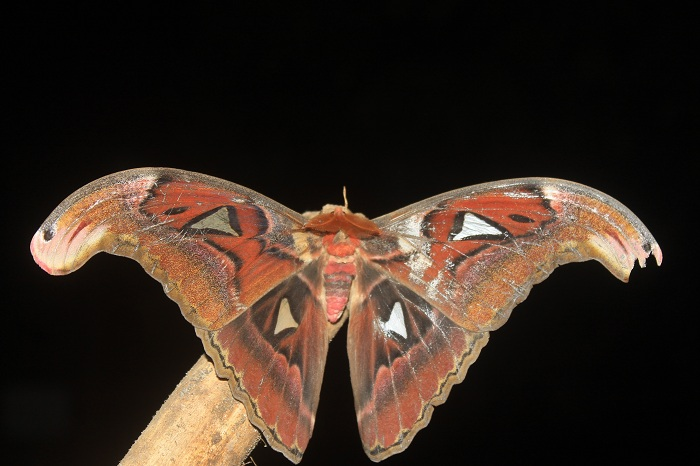

Scientific classification
- Kingdom: Animalia
- Phylum: Arthropoda
- Class: Insecta
- Order: Lepidoptera
- Family: Saturniidae
- Genus: Attacus
- Species: A. erebus

Binomial name
- Attacus erebus Fruhstorfer, 1904

= Attacus erebus =

Species of moth

Attacus erebus is a moth of family Saturniidae. It is native to Sulawesi (Indonesia). This variety is bred locally and shipped worldwide to butterfly farms.

Adult males are highly variable.

The life cycle of erebus is very similar to that of most other Attacus species.
