= Attacus aurantiacus =

Scientific classification
- Kingdom: Animalia
- Phylum: Arthropoda
- Clade: Pancrustacea
- Class: Insecta
- Order: Lepidoptera
- Family: Saturniidae
- Genus: Attacus
- Species: A. aurantiacus

Binomial name
- Attacus aurantiacus W. Rothschild, 1895

Species of moth

Attacus aurantiacus is a moth of the family Saturniidae first described by Walter Rothschild in 1895. It is found on the Kai Islands of Indonesia.
