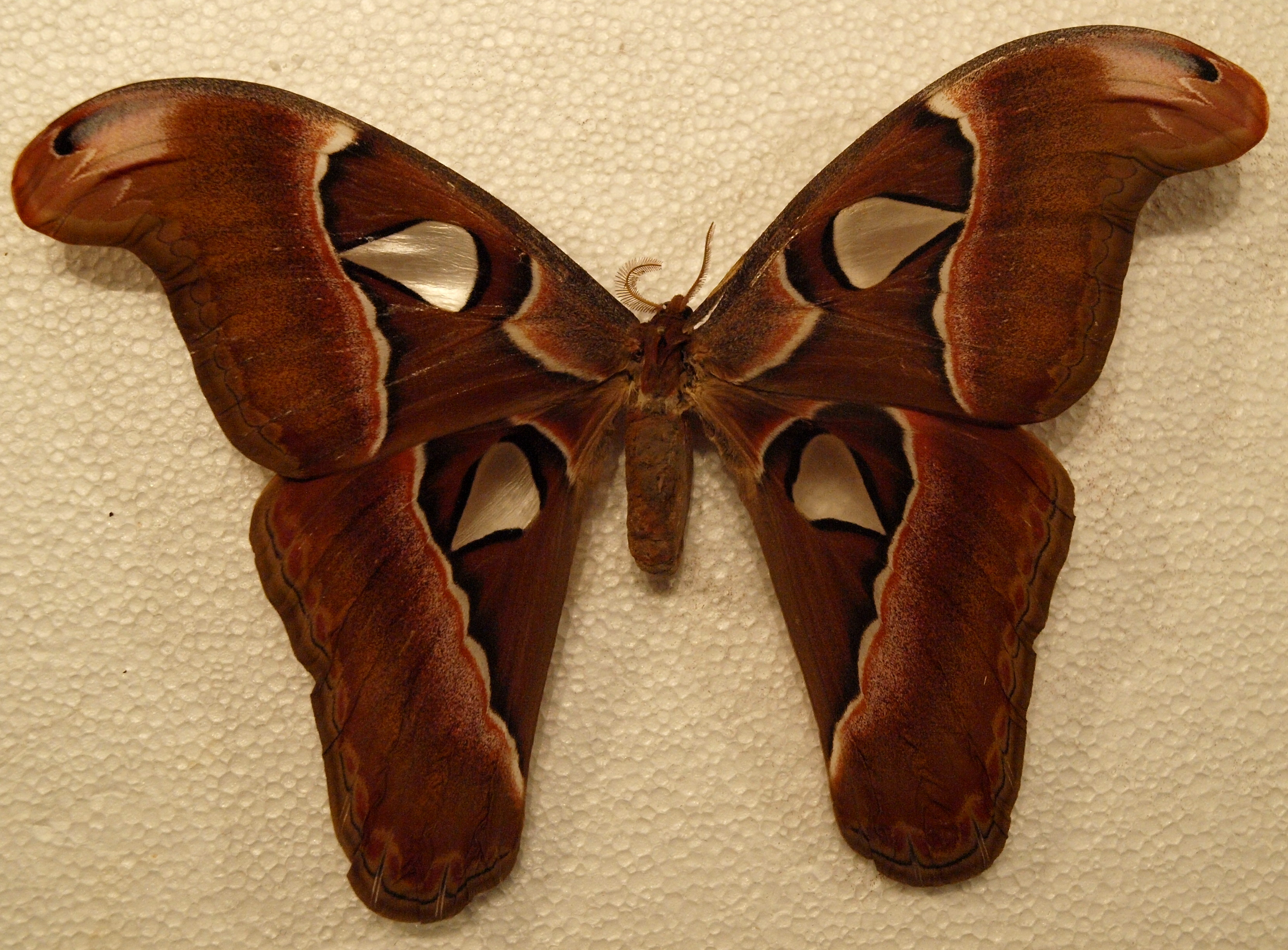

Scientific classification
- Kingdom: Animalia
- Phylum: Arthropoda
- Clade: Pancrustacea
- Class: Insecta
- Order: Lepidoptera
- Family: Saturniidae
- Genus: Attacus
- Species: A. lorquinii

Binomial name
- Attacus lorquinii C. & R. Felder, 1861

= Attacus lorquinii =

Species of moth

Attacus lorquinii or Lorquin's Atlas Moth is a moth in the family Saturniidae. It is found in the Philippines. It is named in honour of the french entomologist Pierre Joseph Michel Lorquin.

== Subspecies ==
- Attacus lorquinii banghaasi Gschwandner, 1920
- Attacus lorquinii calayanensis Brechlin & van Schayck, 2016
- Attacus lorquinii lorquinii C. & R. Felder, 1861
