= Attacus crameri =

Scientific classification
- Kingdom: Animalia
- Phylum: Arthropoda
- Clade: Pancrustacea
- Class: Insecta
- Order: Lepidoptera
- Family: Saturniidae
- Genus: Attacus
- Species: A. crameri

Binomial name
- Attacus crameri C. Felder, 1861

Species of moth

Attacus crameri is a moth in the family Saturniidae. It is found on Buru, Seram and Ambon Island. The specific name crameri is a reference to Pieter Cramer, an 18th-century wool merchant and entomologist.
