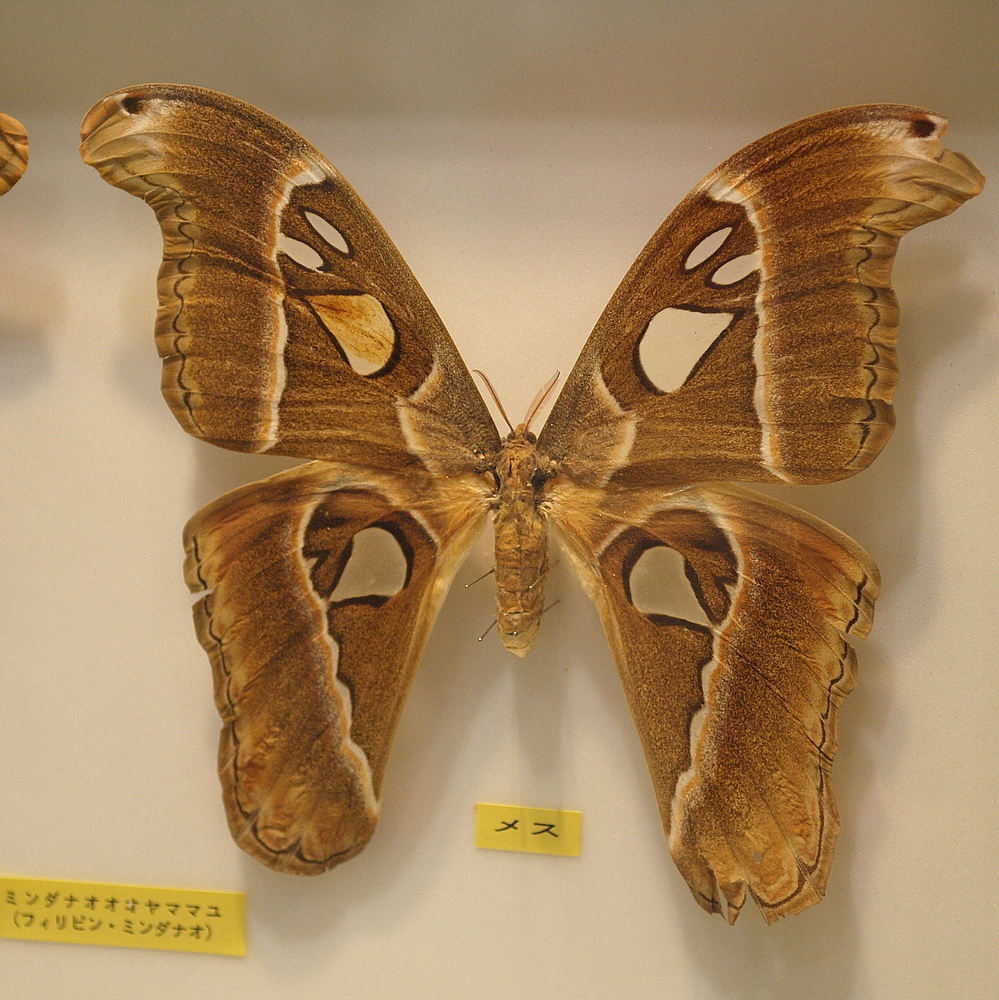
- At Exhibition of insects continent 2008, Osaka.

Scientific classification
- Kingdom: Animalia
- Phylum: Arthropoda
- Clade: Pancrustacea
- Class: Insecta
- Order: Lepidoptera
- Family: Saturniidae
- Genus: Attacus
- Species: A. caesar

Binomial name
- Attacus caesar Maassen, 1873

= Attacus caesar =

Species of moth

Attacus caesar is a moth in the family Saturniidae. It is found in the southern Philippines. It has the second largest documented wingspan of any moth in the world after the white witch moth, at 255 mm (10.0 in).
