= Attacus paukstadtorum =

Scientific classification
- Kingdom: Animalia
- Phylum: Arthropoda
- Clade: Pancrustacea
- Class: Insecta
- Order: Lepidoptera
- Family: Saturniidae
- Genus: Attacus
- Species: A. paukstadtorum

Binomial name
- Attacus paukstadtorum Brechlin, 2010

Species of moth

Attacus paukstadtorum is a moth in the family Saturniidae. It is found on Lombok in Indonesia.
