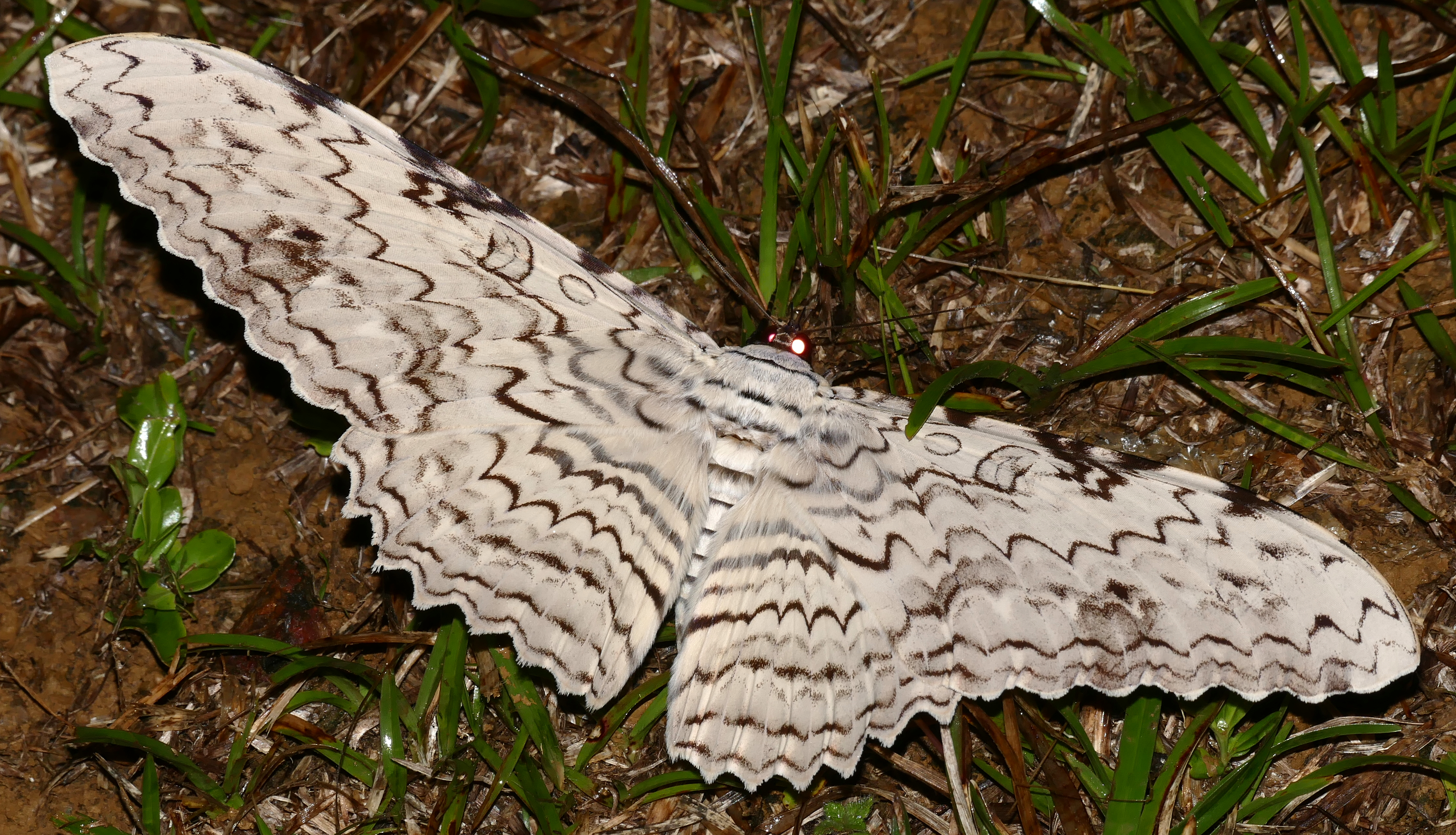
- Thysania agrippina

Scientific classification
- Kingdom: Animalia
- Phylum: Arthropoda
- Clade: Pancrustacea
- Class: Insecta
- Order: Lepidoptera
- Superfamily: Noctuoidea
- Family: Erebidae
- Tribe: Thermesiini
- Genus: Thysania; Dalman, 1824

= Thysania =

Genus of moths

Thysania is a genus of moths in the family Erebidae. The genus was erected by Johan Wilhelm Dalman in 1824.

== Species ==
Image	Species	Common name
	Thysania agrippina (Cramer, 1776)	white witch moth, ghost moth
	Thysania pomponia Jordan, 1924	
	Thysania zenobia (Cramer, 1777)	owl moth
