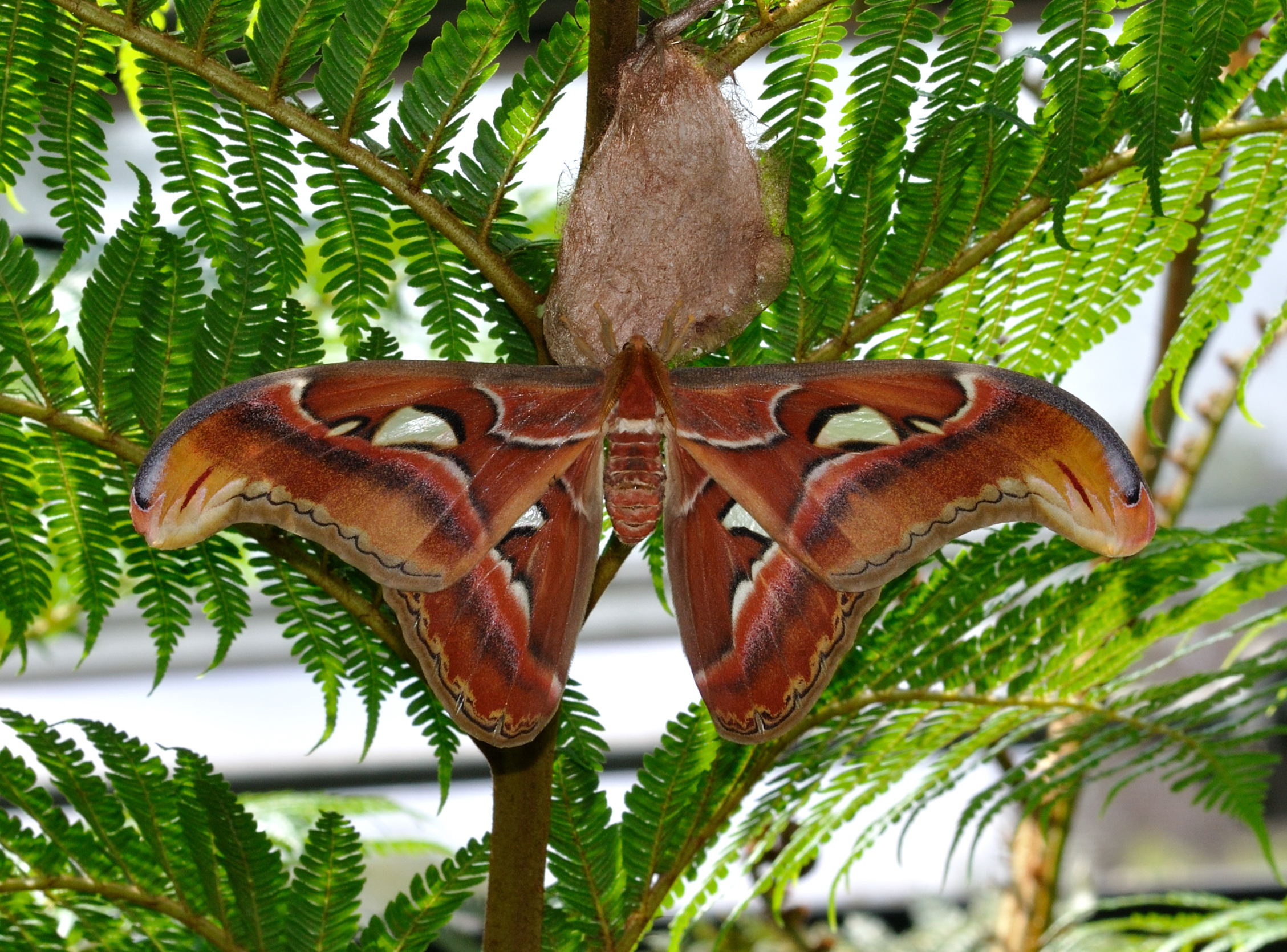

Scientific classification
- Kingdom: Animalia
- Phylum: Arthropoda
- Clade: Pancrustacea
- Class: Insecta
- Order: Lepidoptera
- Family: Saturniidae
- Genus: Attacus
- Species: A. atlas

Binomial name
- Attacus atlas (Linnaeus, 1758)

= Attacus atlas =

Atlas moth

Species of moth

Attacus atlas, the Atlas moth, is a large saturniid moth endemic to the forests of Asia. The species was described by Carl Linnaeus in his 1758 10th edition of Systema Naturae.

The Atlas moth is one of the largest lepidopterans, with a wingspan often measuring from 250mm to 300mm. and a wing surface area of about 160 cm^{2} (25 in^{2}). It is only surpassed in wingspan by the white witch (Thysania agrippina) and Attacus caesar, and in wing surface area by the Hercules moth (Coscinocera hercules). As in most silk moths, females are noticeably larger and heavier than males, while males have broader antennae.

== Etymology ==
Atlas moths are named after Atlas, the Titan of Greek mythology (due to their size). The Cantonese name translates to "snake's head moth", referring to the prominent extension of the forewing that resembles the head of a snake.

== Description ==
Holometabolism (complete metamorphosis)
Eggs	Larva (3rd instar)	Pupa within cocoon	Emerging from pupa	Imago

=== Eggs ===
Atlas moths lay a number of spherical eggs, 2.5 mm (0.098 in) in diameter, on the undersides of the leaves of food plants.

=== Larva ===
After approximately two weeks, dusty-green caterpillars hatch and feed on their egg-shell, and then the foliage of citrus, cinnamon, guava, and evergreen trees. The caterpillars can grow to 11.5 cm (4.5 in) in length and 2.5 cm (0.98 in) in thickness. They have white, waxy, fleshy spines along their backs, which become more prominent at later instars. On the last abdominal segment beside the prolegs, there is a large green spot surrounded by an orange ring.

Development takes place over six larval instars, with the first instar ranging from 4–5 days, the second from 8–10 days, and third between 13 & 14 days. The fourth, fifth and sixth instars last 10–11 days, 12–13 days, and 14–15 days, respectively.

=== Pupa ===
After reaching a length of about 11.5 cm (4.5 in), the caterpillars pupate. They spin a 7–8 cm long papery cocoon interwoven with desiccated leaves and attach it to a twig using a strand of silk. The adult moths emerge from the cocoon after approximately four weeks depending on environmental factors.

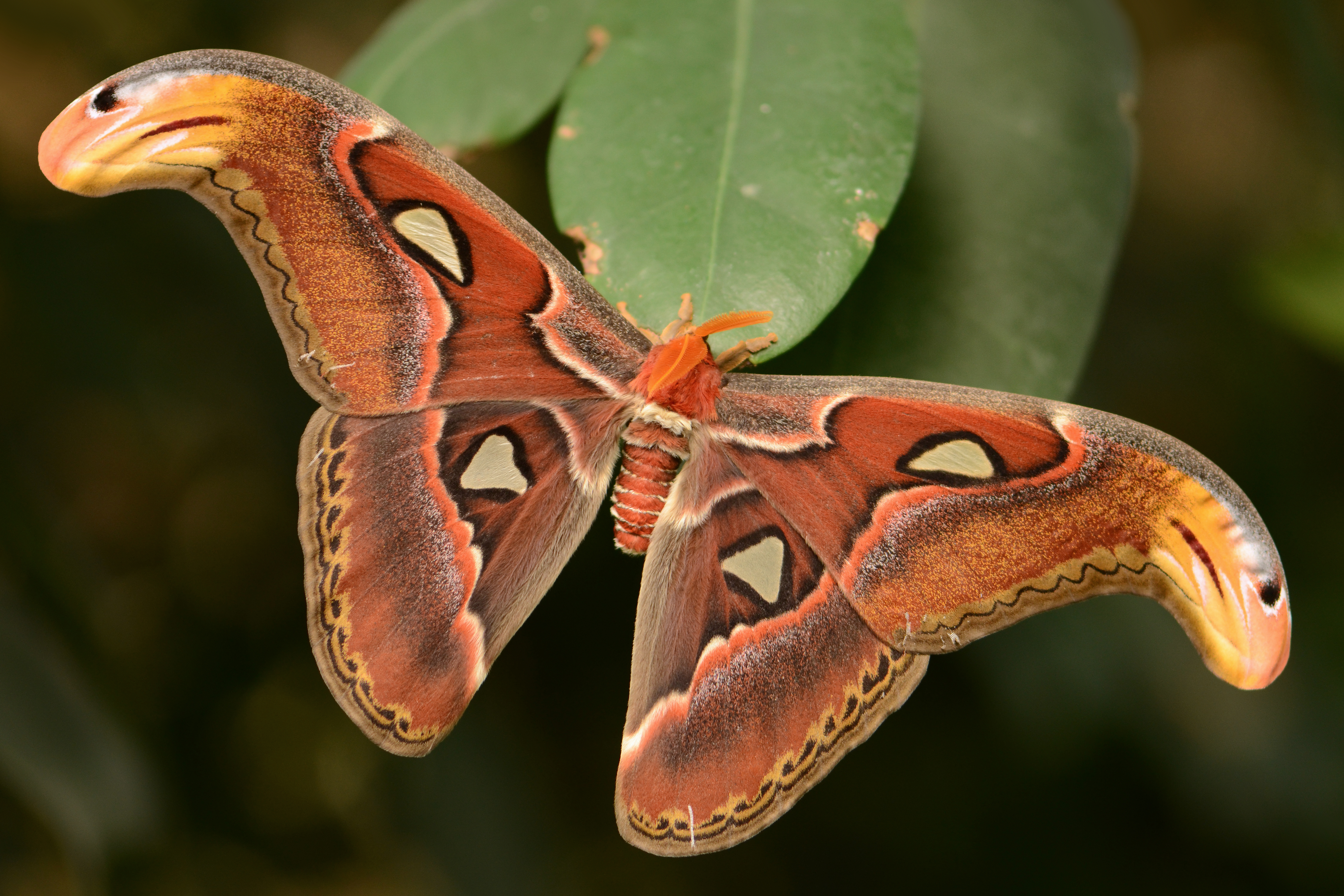
Male Atlas moth

=== Imago ===
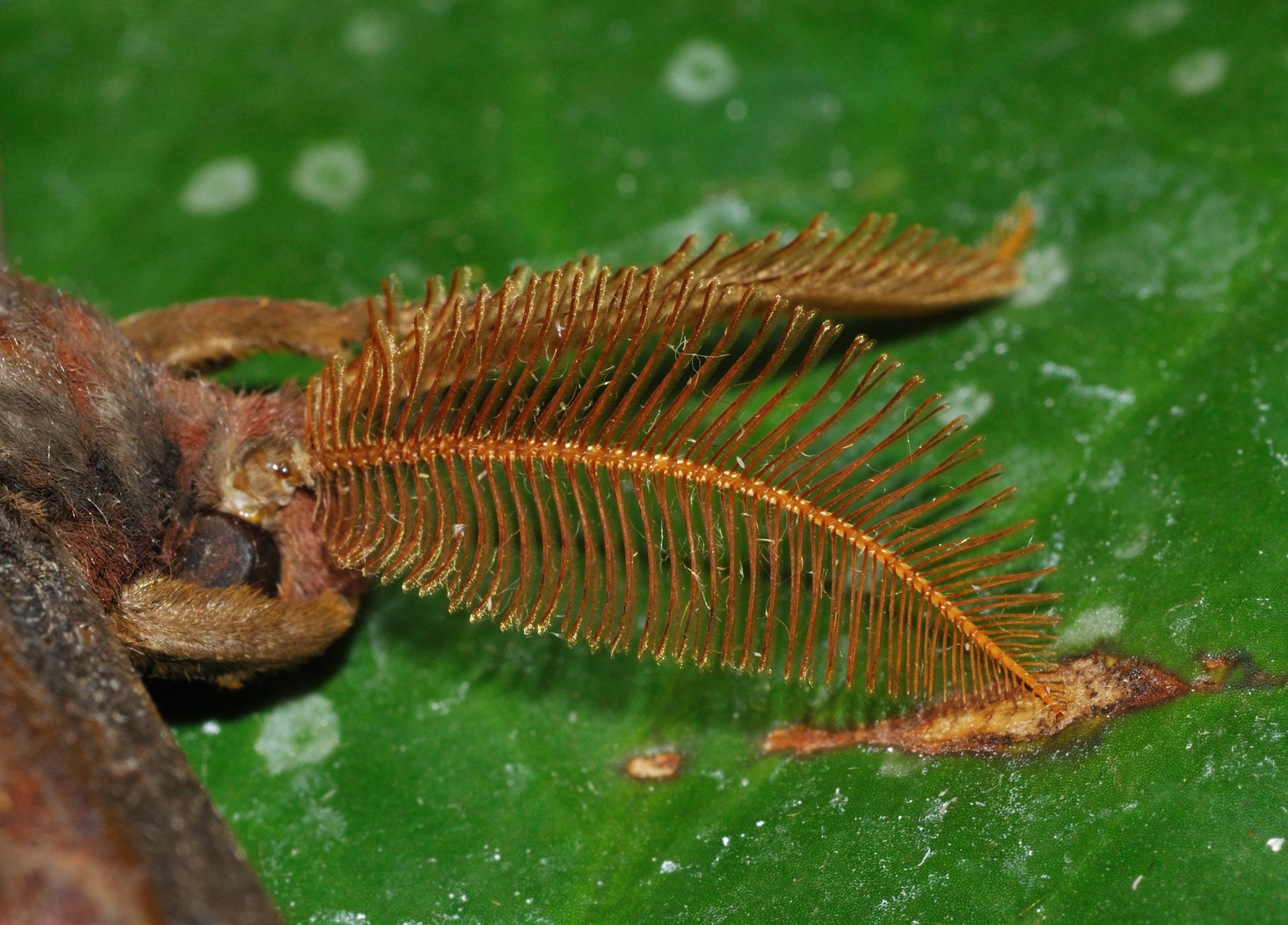
Detail of a male atlas moth imago's head, showing the large, feather-like antennae

Adult Atlas moths are weak, unsteady fliers. To conserve energy, the moths rest during the day and fly at night. As they lack fully formed mouthparts, the adults cannot eat, subsisting entirely on fat reserves accumulated during the larval stage. As a result, they live for only a few days during which their sole objective is seeking out a mate. Adults may be found on wing throughout the year but are most abundant between November and January.

Females release pheromones through a gland on the end of the abdomen to attract a mate. Females stay near discarded cocoons, seeking out a perch where the air currents will best carry their pheromones. Males can detect and home in on these pheromones from several kilometers away using chemoreceptors located on their feathery antennae.

Adult male Attacus atlas moths produce juvenile hormones I and II, with JH II being the predominant form, and at levels significantly higher than in females, highlighting sexual dimorphism in hormone production.

The body is small compared to the wings. The upper side of the wings is reddish brown with a pattern of black, white, pink, and purple lines. There are triangular, scale-less windows bordered in black on each of the four wings. The undersides of the wings are paler. The tips of both forewings have prominent extensions that resemble the head of a snake. The resemblance is exaggerated by movements of the wings when the moth is confronted by potential predators.

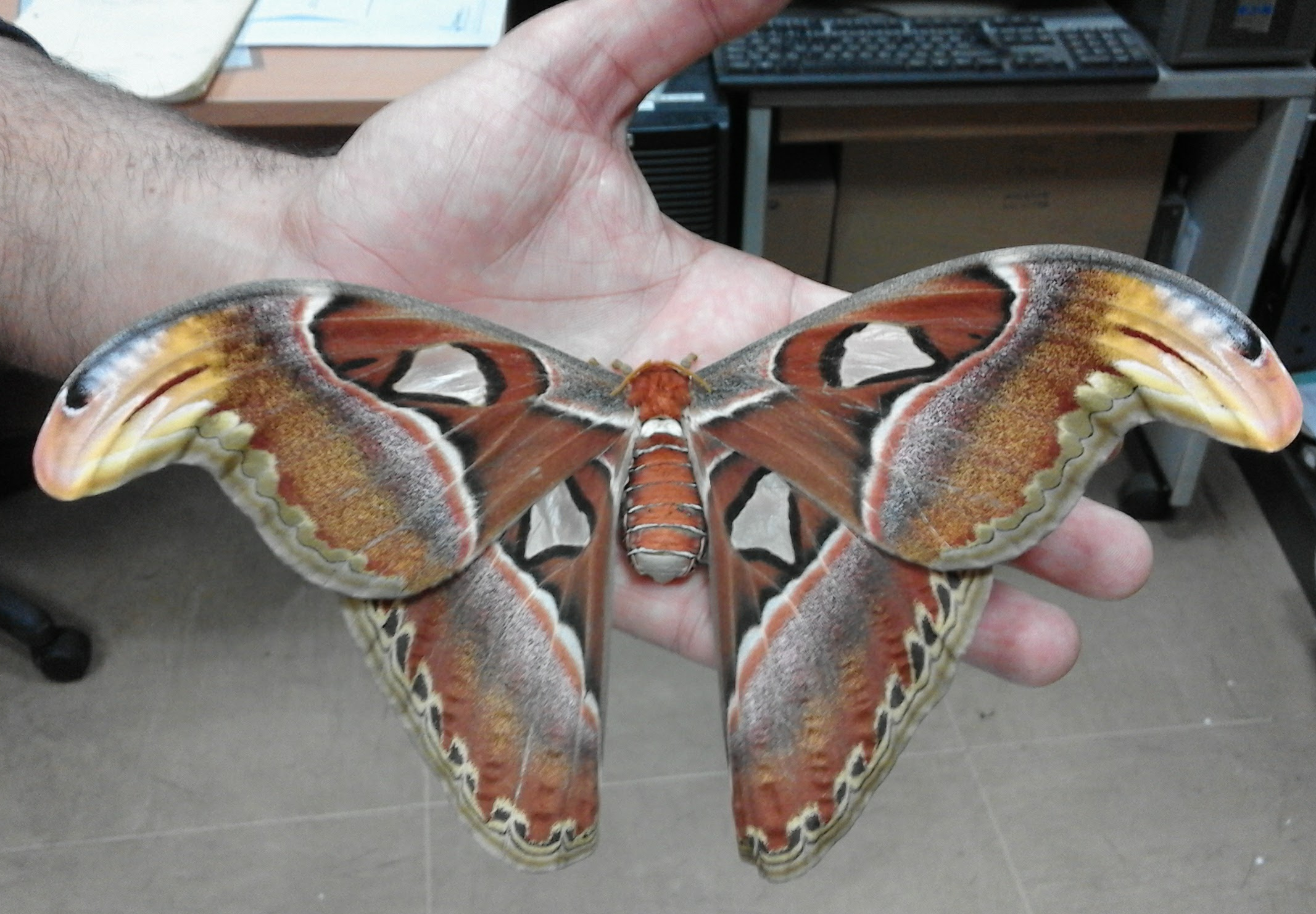
Atlas moth compared to human hand

The Atlas moth has a very short, vestigial proboscis, and they do not eat once they have emerged from the cocoon, relying on fat storage for energy. Every flight takes valuable energy and can take days off their already short lives, as it has a very short life span of only one to two weeks. They conserve energy by flying as little as possible. A female will wait for a male to come along and be fertilized, lay eggs and die.

== Habitat ==
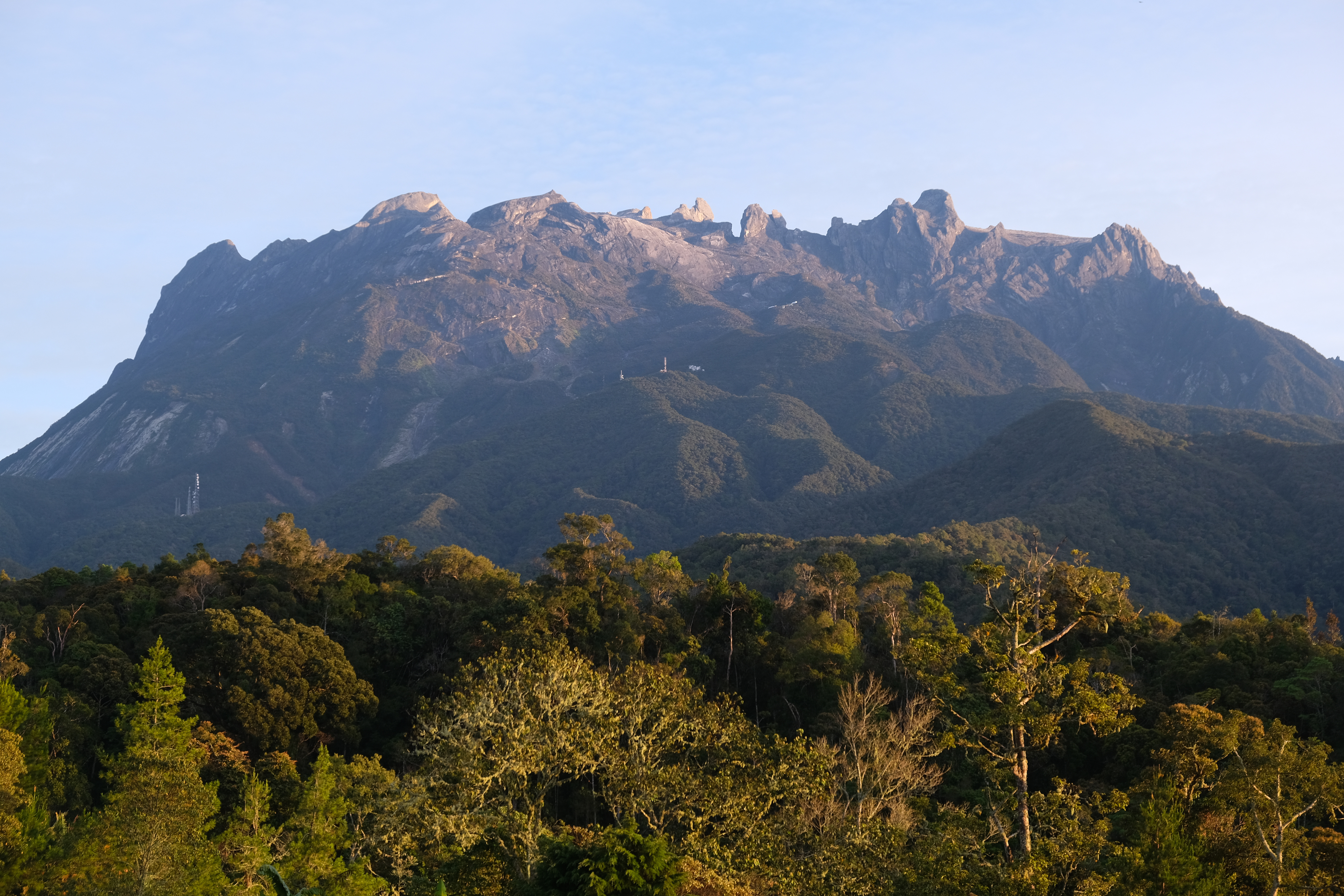
Habitat on Mount Kinabalu

Their habitat is primarily dry tropical forests, secondary forests, and shrublands across South Asia, East Asia, and Southeast Asia, including Borneo.

== Relationship with humans ==
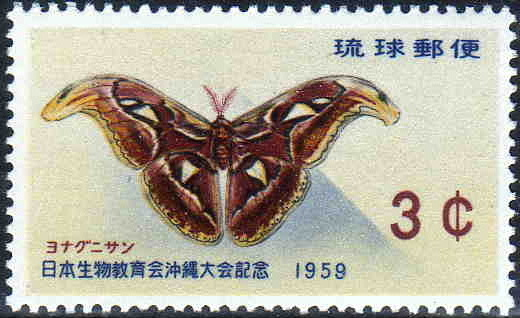
Japanese stamp featuring an Atlas moth

In India, Atlas moths are cultivated for their silk in a non-commercial capacity. Unlike silk produced by the related domestic silkmoth (Bombyx mori), Atlas moth silk is secreted as broken strands and is therefore less desirable. This brown, wool-like silk, known as fagara, is thought to have greater durability. Atlas moth cocoons are sometimes used as small pocket change purses in Taiwan. There is ongoing research as to whether the silk of the Atlas moth can be used as a substitute for common silks. The quality of the heavier cocoons, less restrictive rearing conditions, and competent properties of the fibers, make the silk produced by the Atlas moth a potential alternative for common silks. A study concluded that the silk fibers of the atlas moth had about an 80% higher density of cells and growth compared to the silk fibers of the silk moth.

The Japanese subspecies A. a. ryukyuensis, is native to Yonaguni in the Yaeyama Islands.

=== Threats & Conservation ===
Climate change, moth trapping, light pollution, pesticides, habitat loss and fragmentation all negatively effect abundance of Attacus atlas and other giant moths. Although not listed on the IUCN Red List due to a scarcity of data, the Atlas moth meets their requirements for a "threatened" species.

Attacus atlas depends on its habitat (tropical & subtropical rainforests, secondary forests, shrublands) and for this reason, "has the potential to be an important flagship species for the conservation of these ecological communities.".

== Similar taxa ==
The term "Atlas moth" is sometimes used mistakenly as a name for any species in the genus Attacus, of which there are over 20 named species and subspecies. Attacus taprobanis native to southern India and Sri Lanka is very similar in morphology to the much more widely distributed Attacus atlas. It was once considered a subspecies of A. atlas. A few New World species can be mistaken for Atlas moths, specifically members of the genus Rothschildia. Very similar in appearance to the Asian Atlas moth, Rothschildia aurota is one of the largest members of its genus and a Neotropical relative.

== See also ==
- List of largest insects
