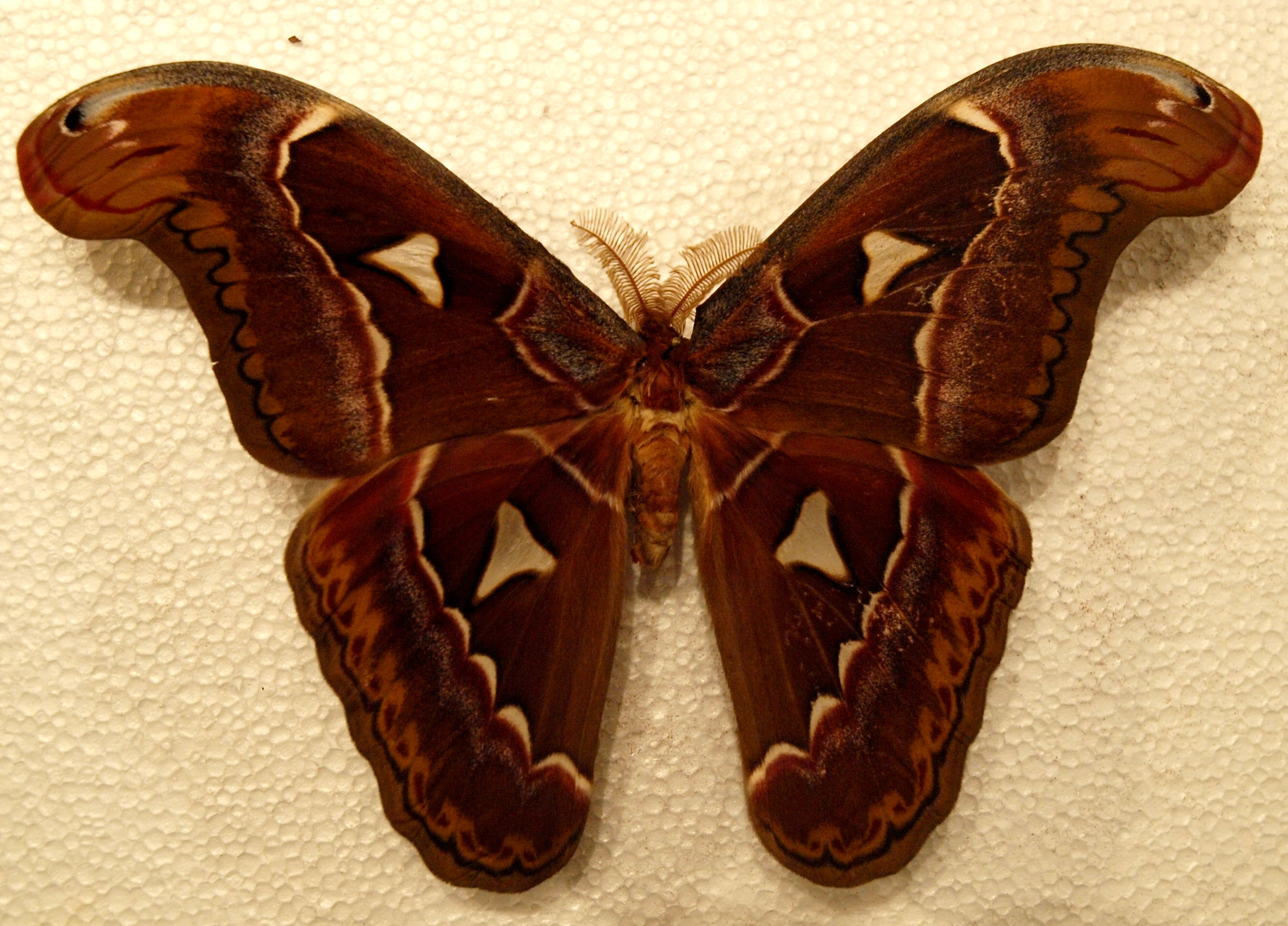
- Male from Timor

Scientific classification
- Kingdom: Animalia
- Phylum: Arthropoda
- Clade: Pancrustacea
- Class: Insecta
- Order: Lepidoptera
- Family: Saturniidae
- Genus: Attacus
- Species: A. dohertyi

Binomial name
- Attacus dohertyi W. Rothschild, 1895

Synonyms
- Attacus dohertyi soembanus van Eecke, 1933

= Attacus dohertyi =

Species of moth

Attacus dohertyi is a moth in the family Saturniidae first described by Rothschild in 1895. It is found on Timor, Roma and Damar.
