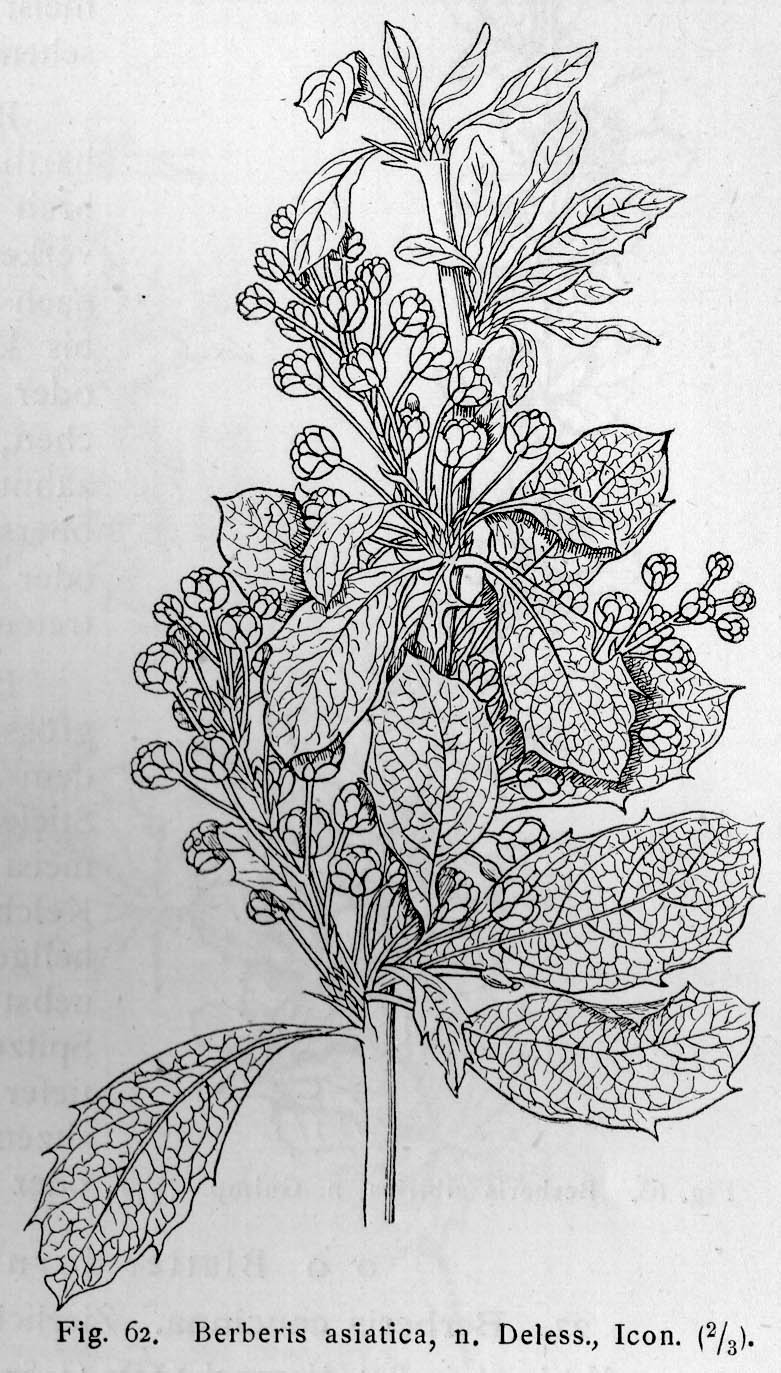
- Illustration of Berberis asiatica from the book Handbuch der Laubholzkunde from 1889 by Dr. Leopold Dippel

Scientific classification
- Kingdom: Plantae
- Clade: Tracheophytes
- Clade: Angiosperms
- Clade: Eudicots
- Order: Ranunculales
- Family: Berberidaceae
- Genus: Berberis
- Species: B. asiatica

Binomial name
- Berberis asiatica Roxb. ex DC.

Synonyms
- Berberis asiatica var. clarkeana C.K.Schneid. in Bull. Herb. Boissier, sér. 2, 5: 457 (1905); Berberis dealbata Lindl. in Edwards's Bot. Reg. 21: t. 1750 (1836); Berberis hypoleuca Lindl. in J. Hort. Soc. London 2: 246 (1847); Berberis ilicifolia Roxb. in Asiat. Res. 6: 357 (1799), nom. illeg.; Berberis vinifera T.S.Ying in Fl. Xizang. 2: 142 (1985)

= Berberis asiatica =

Species of flowering plant

Berberis asiatica (Indian or Asian barberry), is a species of shrub, in the family Berberidaceae. It is native to the Himalayas (East and West Himalaya), India (including Himachal Pradesh region), Bangladesh, Myanmar, Nepal and Tibet.

It is found in subtropical to temperate regions, and at altitudes of 600–2,700 m (1,968.5–8,858.3 ft) above sea level.

B. asiatica is an upright, spiny and glabrous bush. It has blood-red coloured fruit.

It was first published in Syst. Nat. 2: 13 in 1821. The name has been verified by United States Department of Agriculture and the Agricultural Research Service on 2 January 2003.

Its fruit has potential nutraceutical values. Extracts from the fruit possesses a potential source of polyphenolic, mainly anthocyanin compounds, which can be used for treating inflammation diseases (Neag et al. 2018).

== Other sources ==
- Council of Scientific and Industrial Research, India. 1988. The wealth of India: a dictionary of Indian raw materials and industrial products. Raw materials (revised edition). 2:114-117.
- Council of Scientific and Industrial Research, India. 2000. The wealth of India: a dictionary of Indian raw materials and industrial products. First supplementary series (raw materials). New Delhi 1:135.
- Grierson, A. J. C. & D. J. Long. 1984-. Flora of Bhutan including a record of plants from Sikkim.
- Hara, H. et al. 1978–1982. An enumeration of the flowering plants of Nepal.
- Huxley, A., ed. 1992. The new Royal Horticultural Society dictionary of gardening
- Sharma, B. D. et al., eds. 1993-. Flora of India.
- Walters, S. M. et al., eds. 1986–2000. European garden flora.
