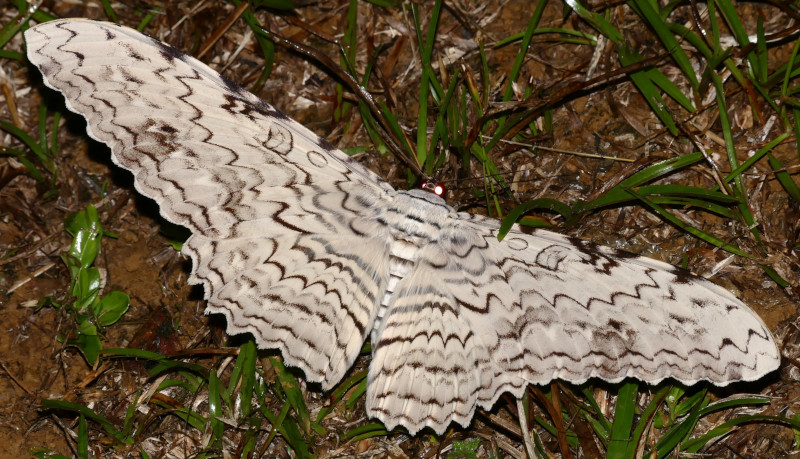

Scientific classification
- Kingdom: Animalia
- Phylum: Arthropoda
- Class: Insecta
- Order: Lepidoptera
- Superfamily: Noctuoidea
- Family: Erebidae
- Genus: Thysania
- Species: T. agrippina

Binomial name
- Thysania agrippina (Cramer, 1776)

Synonyms
- Phalaena agrippina Cramer, 1776; Syrnia strix Hubner, 1821

= Thysania agrippina =

White witch

Species of moth

Thysania agrippina is a species of moth in the family Erebidae. It was described by Maria Sibylla Merian in her 1705 publication Metamorphosis insectorum Surinamensium, and Pieter Cramer provided the formal description of the species in 1776. The most commonly accepted English name is the white witch. Other common names include the ghost moth, great gray witch and great owlet moth. Thysania agrippina is of interest as a competitor for title of "largest insect". This may be true by the measure of wingspan—a Brazilian specimen with a wingspan of almost 30 cm (12 in) appears to hold the record. The Atlas moth and Hercules moth, however, have greater wing areas. The white witch occurs from Uruguay to Mexico, and appears as a stray as far north as Texas in the U.S. Collection dates shows no discernible pattern with respect to location or season.

== History ==
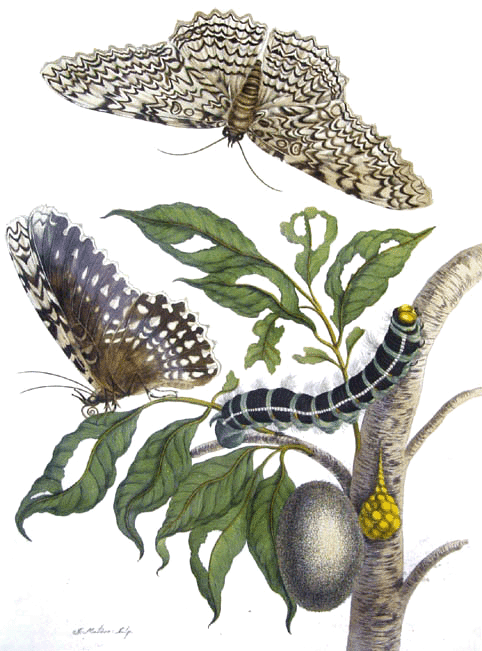
The larva illustrated by Maria Sibylla Merian (1647–1717) as Thysania agrippina is a sphingid, probably Pachylia syces.

One story of the derivation of the common name: early naturalists collected specimens of birds and bats with shotguns. An enormous darting flyer high in the canopy was a tempting target. Firing a cloud of pellets at a white witch moth did not necessarily bring it down, however, because the body is small relative to the wing area. The moth would sail along, an unkillable witch.

This moth is of historical interest as the subject of a well-known painting by the artist Maria Sibylla Merian. Merian was an insightful naturalist who advanced the 18th-century understanding of insect life cycles; however, her depiction of the white witch life cycle does not match the actual biology of this species, as it depicts the larva of an unrelated moth.

== Taxonomy ==
Conventionally, "white witch" refers to two very similar species of Thysania listed in the GBIF database: T. agrippina and T. pomponia (T. zenobia is a third morphologically distinct species). However, a 2016 publication proposes a new species among the subset of moths previously identified as T. agrippina. Thysania winbrechiini is differentiated from T. agrippina by morphological features and DNA evidence. T. winbrechiini is further categorized as containing two subspecies, and the authors also define a subspecies of T. agrippina, T. agrippina siriae, though considered by some to be of dubious validity in the case of this and several hundred other "Brechlin and Meister species", which are often proposed on the basis of DNA alone.

== Biology ==
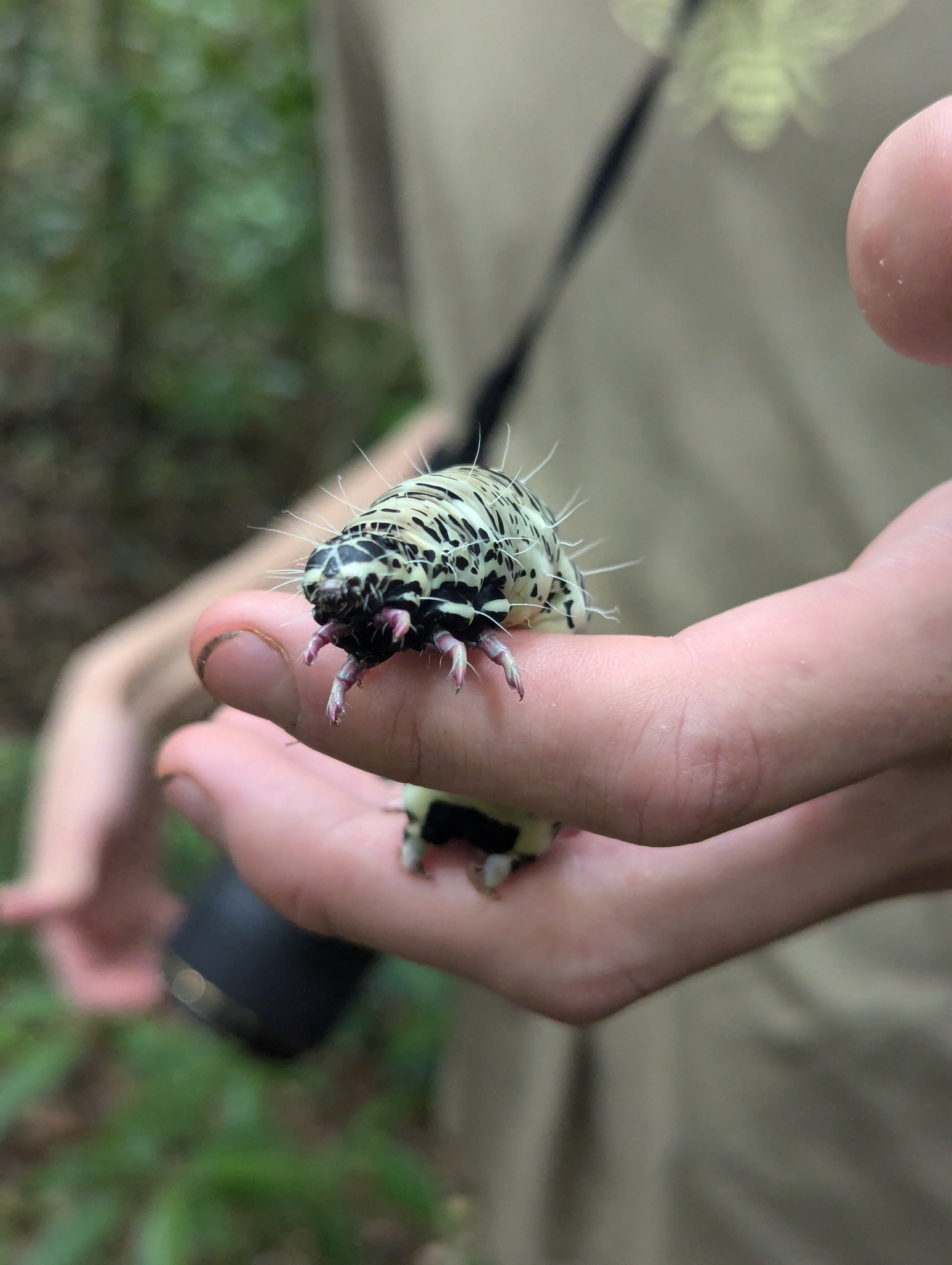
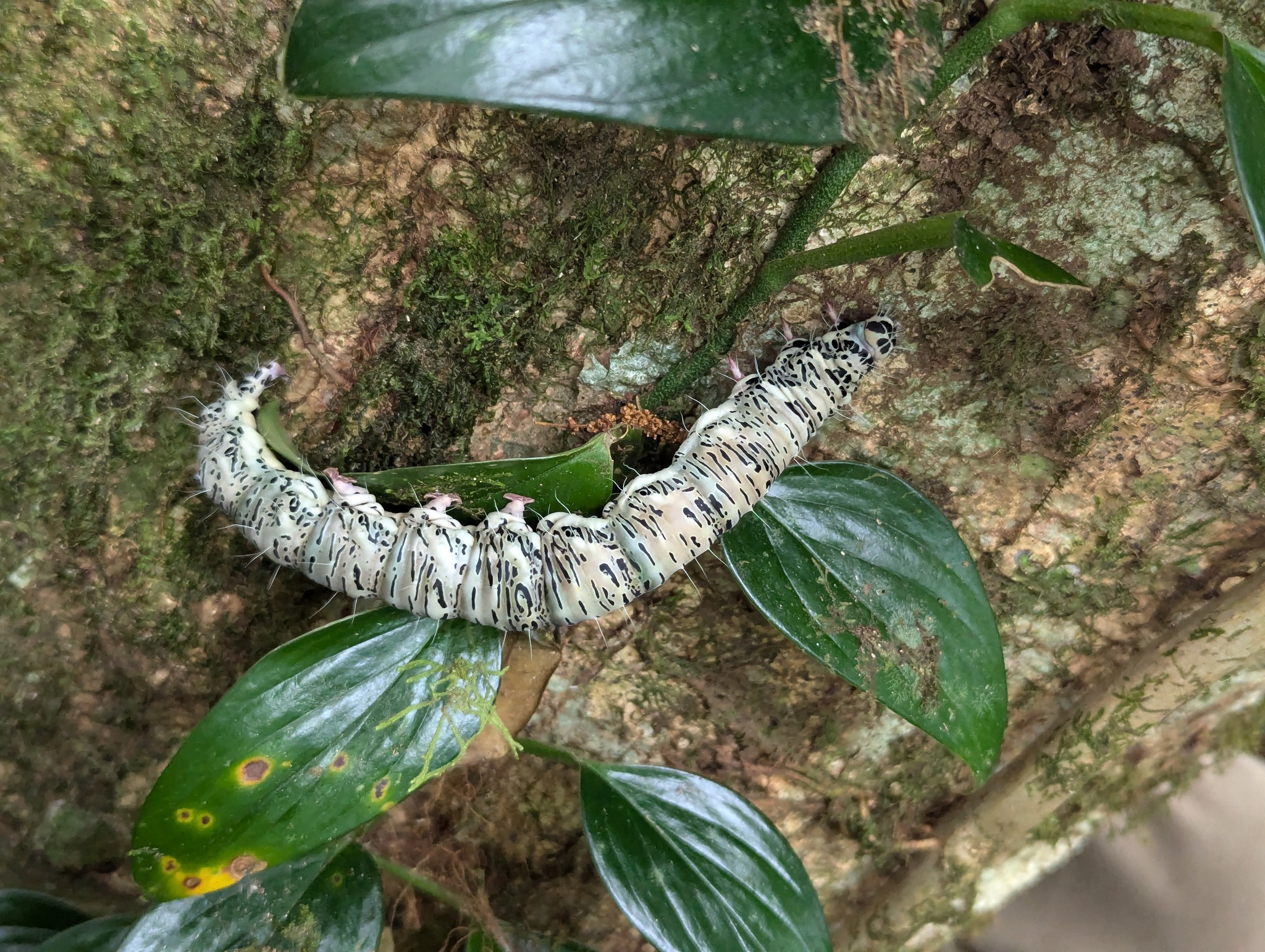
Larva, photographed in Panama in January 2025

Given the enormous geographic range of the adult, its large size, and observations that date back 300 years, it is striking that the immature life stages of this species had never been documented (notwithstanding the erroneous Merian painting) until 2025. Long migratory flight is likely, given that the close relatives Thysania zenobia (the owl moth) and Ascalapha odorata (the black witch) are known for flights that reach far north of the host plant distributions. Based on the larval host plants recorded for the owl moth and black witch, the larval host plants for the white witch are probably also woody members of Fabaceae (subfamily Caesalpinioideae), possibly Senna and/or Cassia.

White Witch Watch is a project led by the lepidopterist David L. Wagner at the University of Connecticut, seeking to identify the immature stages of the white witch. A key strategy: to obtain a gravid female and attempt rearing on likely hosts. The participants maintain a website, and an active citizen science project on iNaturalist.

In January 2025, a white witch caterpillar was finally found in Panama, having been identified on iNaturalist as the larva of this moth, and reared to adulthood for confirmation.

== Gallery ==
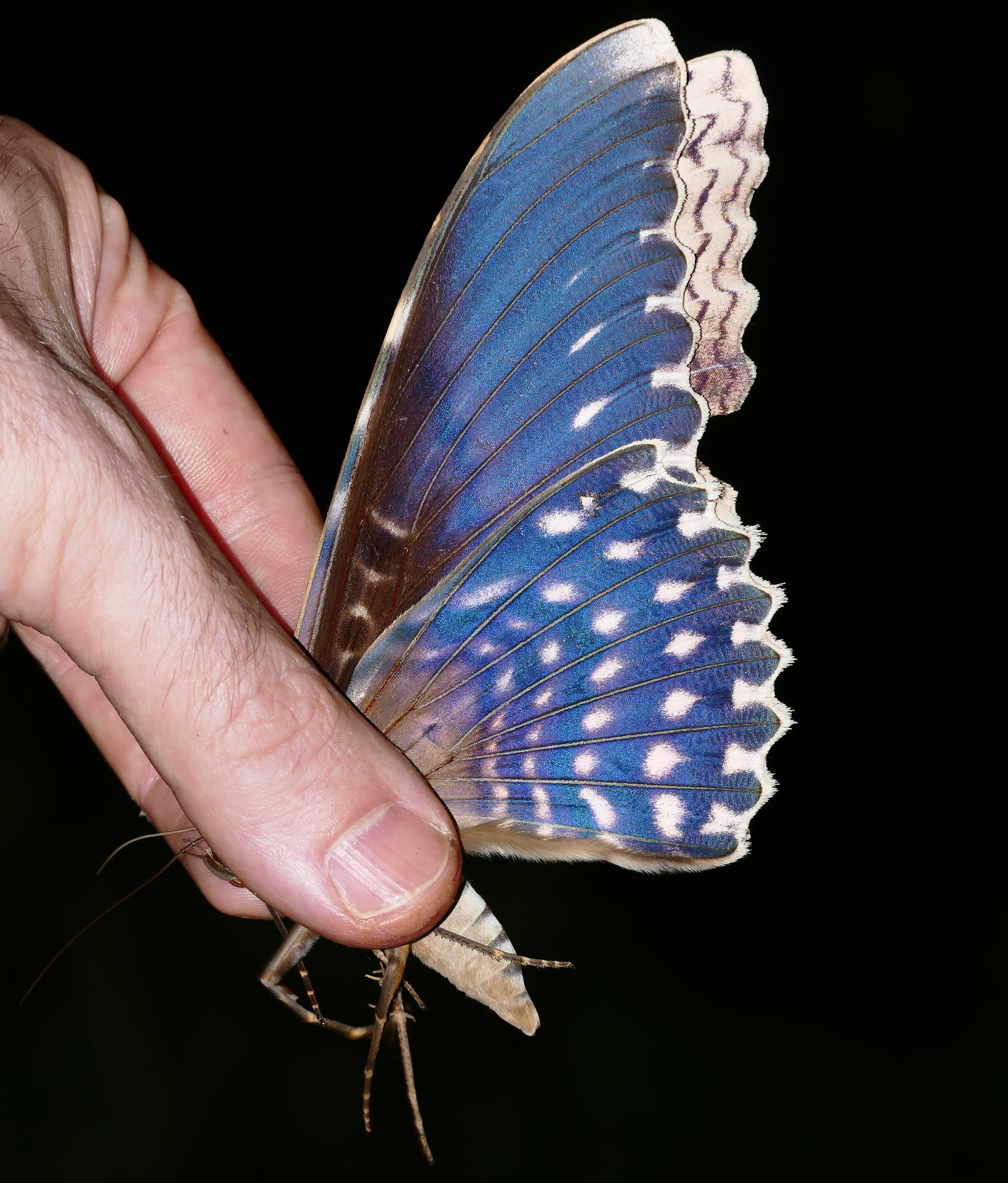
Showing the iridescent underside, French Guiana

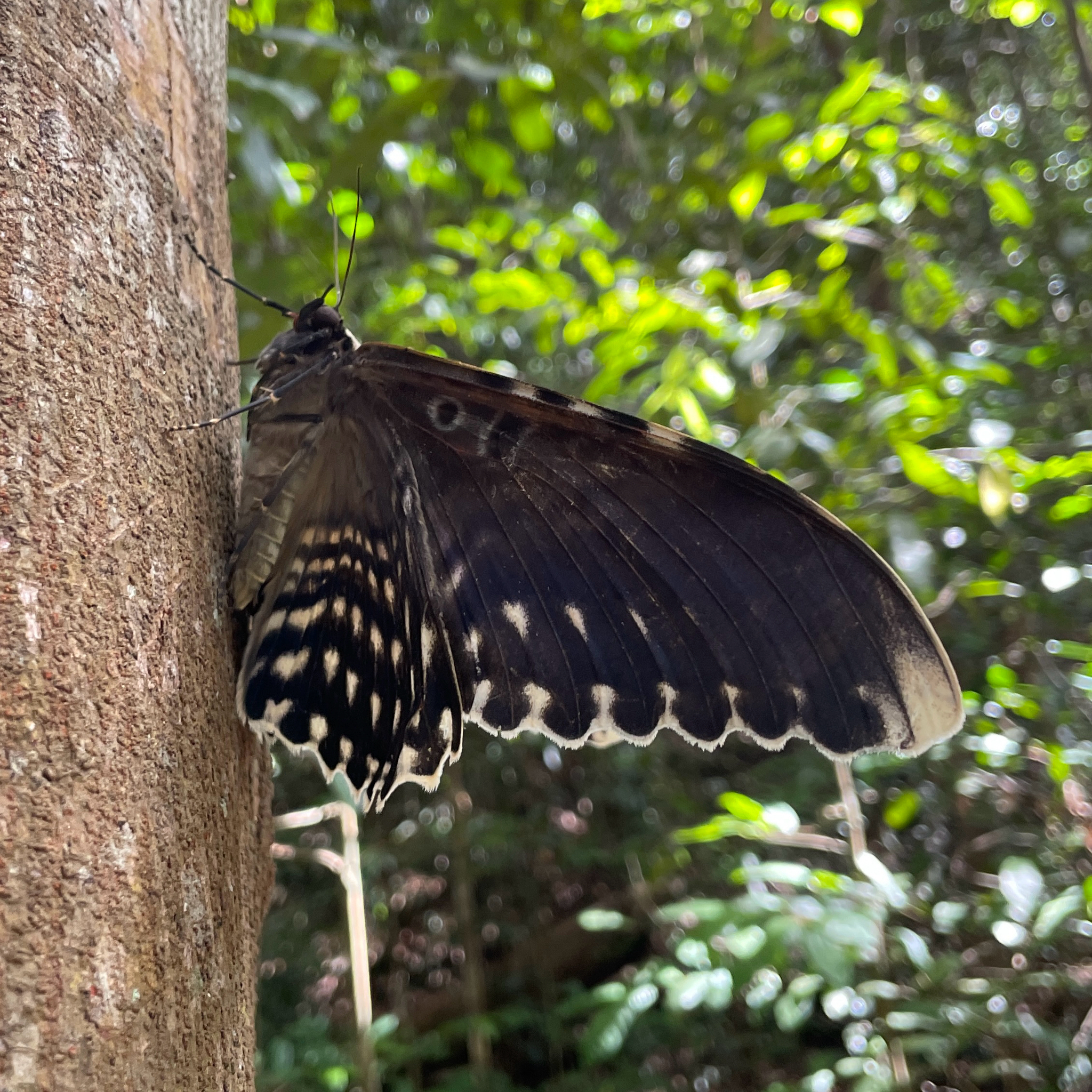
With wings folded back, in Brazil

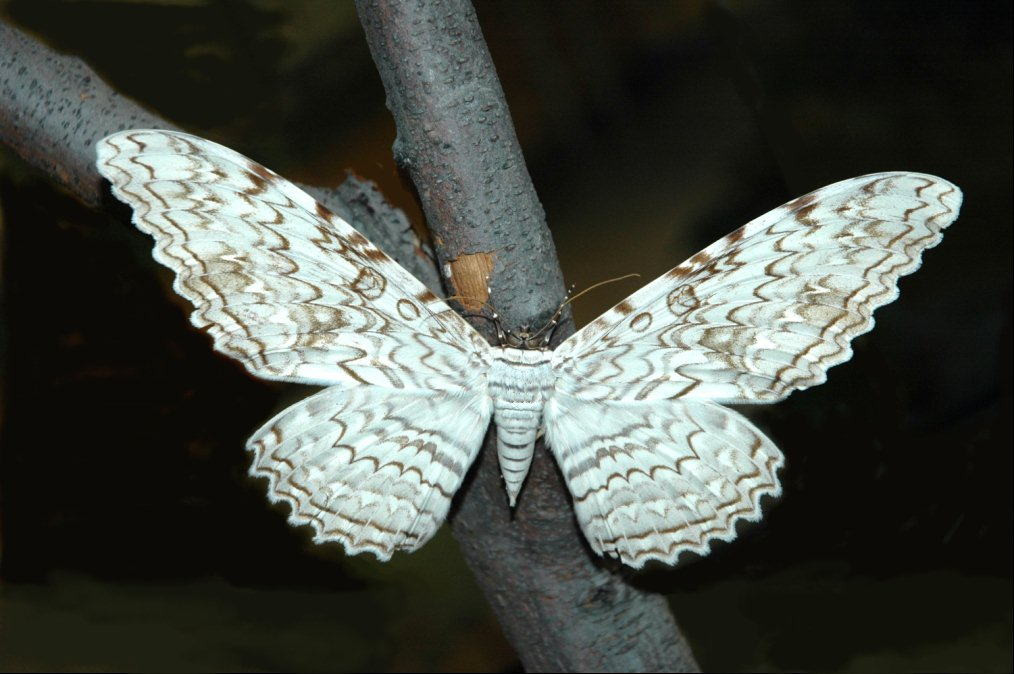
With wings stretched out

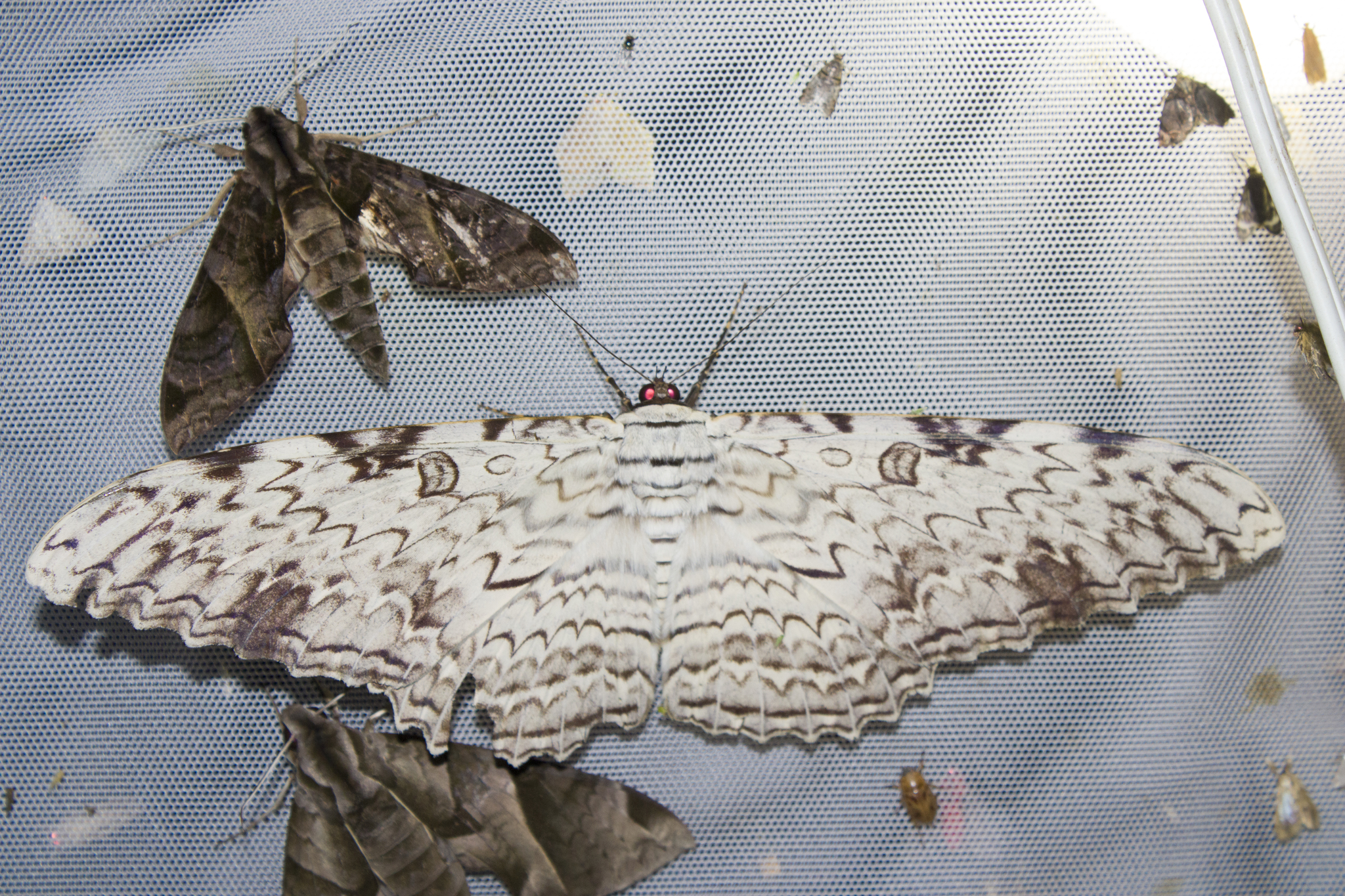
With (Eumorpha satellitia) and (Eumorpha triangulum), in Nicaragua

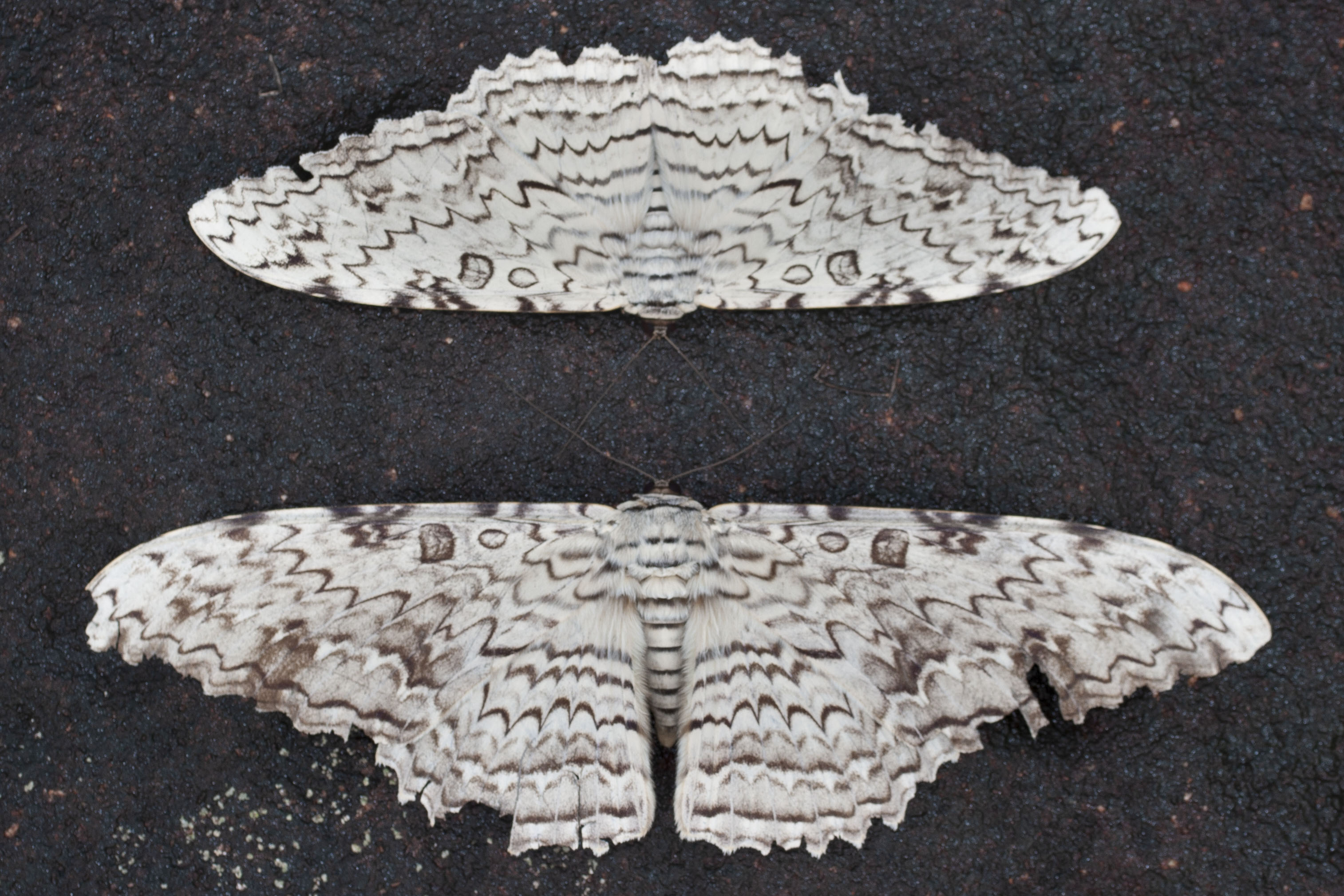
Showing size variation, in Suriname

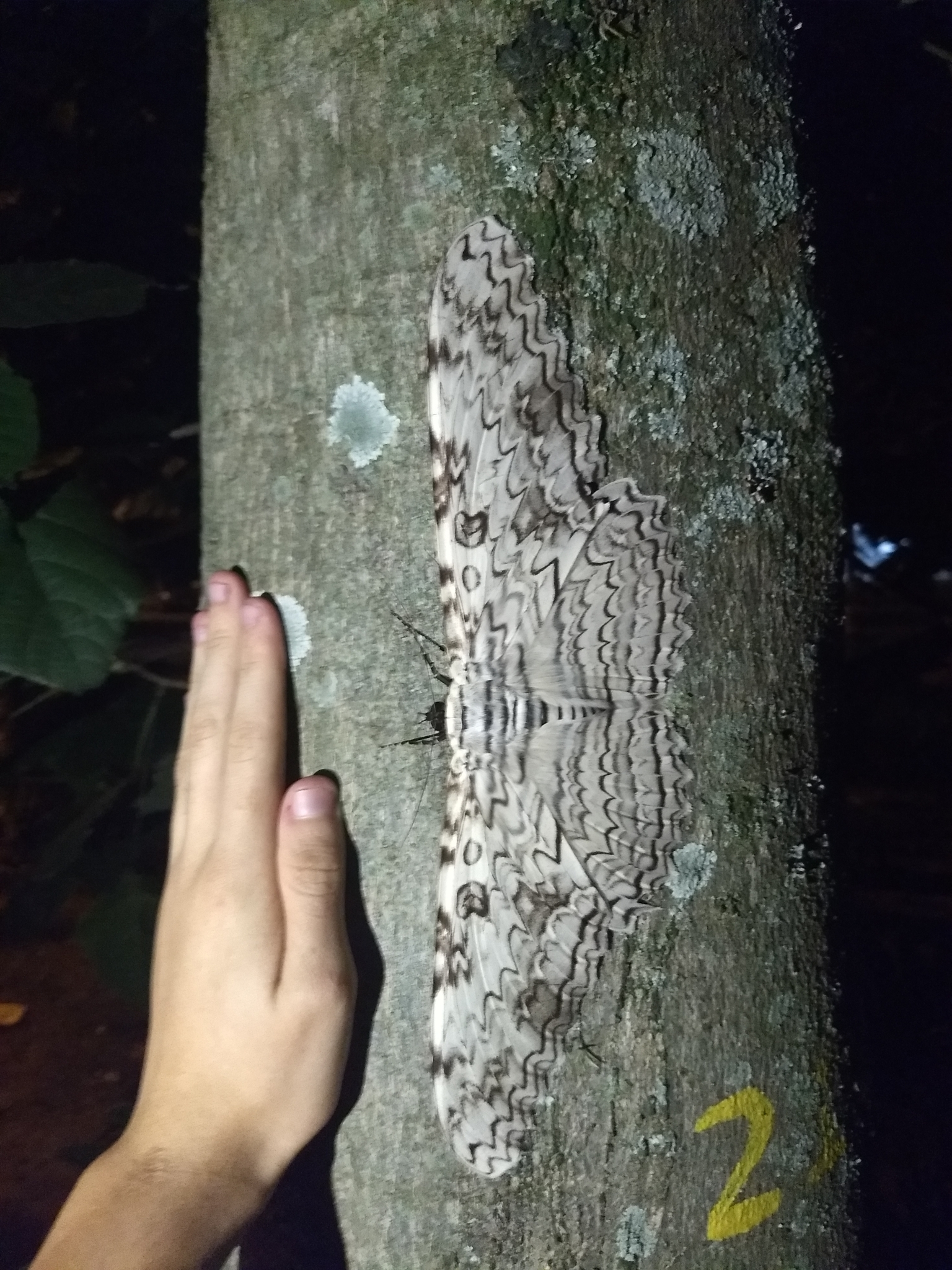
Showing size, in Colombia

== See also ==
- Ascalapha odorata, the black witch
- List of largest insects
