= Nepalese diaspora =

Person who currently holds citizenship of Nepal

नेपाली प्रवासी
- Flag of Nepal

Total population
- c. 2,637,195

Regions with significant populations
- Burma: 1,005,069
- India: 663,518 (2024)
- Malaysia: 502,596 (2024)
- Saudi Arabia: 297,561 (2024)
- Qatar: 266,580 (2024)
- United States: 264,317 (2024)
- Australia: 213,580 (2025)
- Japan: 185,644 (2024)
- South Korea: 90,097 (2025)
- United Kingdom: 64,000 (2018)
- Portugal: 56,866 (2025)
- Bangladesh: 52,621 (2024)
- Canada: 29,554 (2024)
- Kuwait: 26,292 (2024)
- United Arab Emirates: 26,097 (2024)
- Thailand: 20,000
- Croatia: 20,000 (2023)
- Oman: 18,147 (2024)
- Hong Kong: 15,950
- Fiji: 10,000
- Denmark: 8,562 (2024)
- Singapore: 7,000 (2019)
- New Zealand: 6,832 (2024)
- Brunei: 6,237 (2024)
- Belgium: 5,887 (2024)
- Bahrain: 2,641 (2024)
- Germany: 5,705 (2019)
- Sri Lanka: 5,000
- France: 5,000 (2019)
- Poland: 4,400
- Finland: 4,232 (2024)
- Spain: 4,301 (2019)
- Israel: 3,599 (2019)
- China: 3,500
- Libya: 3,064
- Netherlands: 3,000 (2019)
- Philippines: 2,745 (2000 Philippines census)
- Italy: 2,550 (2024)
- Norway: 2,483 (2024)
- Sweden: 2,200 (2019)
- Vietnam: 2,000
- Romania: 1,000
- Bhutan: 1,000
- Austria: 679 (2019)
- Russia: 500 (2019)

Languages
- Languages of Nepal

Religion
- Hinduism; Buddhism; Islam; Kirant; Others

The Nepalese diaspora (ISO: Nepālī Prabāsī), officially Non-Resident Nepalese (NRNs) (Note: Nepali: गैर आवासीय नेपाली, romanized: Gair Aawasiya Nepali) are people of Nepalese ancestry who reside or originate outside of Nepal. According to the Government of Nepal, the term Non-Resident Nepalese applies to two distinct categories: Nepalese citizens currently living abroad, and foreign citizens of Nepalese origin holding citizenship of a country other than a SAARC member state.

The Non-Resident Nepali Act of 2007, has defined Non-Resident Nepali (NRN) (Nepali: गैर आवासीय नेपाली, as person of Nepali origin (By birth, ancestry blood rights or by other means) who currently reside out of Nepal for any reason.

Nepali citizen residing abroad (आप्रवासी नेपाली/"Aaprabashi Nepali") means a Nepali citizen who has been residing in any foreign country for at least two years by doing any profession, occupation, business and employment except a Nepali citizen residing in a foreign country under the assignment of the Government of Nepal. Or a person of Nepali origin is a person of Nepali origin or ancestry who was or whose ancestors were born in Nepal or other nations with Nepali ancestry but is not a citizen of Nepal. The Non-Resident Nepali Association was established by the conference held by 11–14 October 2003 in Kathmandu, Nepal. The seventh NRNA global conference was held on 14–17 October 2017 in Kathmandu, Nepal.

== Activities ==
NRN are opening business opportunities in Nepal by investing in various sectors such as banking, tourism, hotel, and hydropower.

Non-resident Nepalis can acquire Nepali citizenship as per the Nepal Citizenship (Third Amendment) Regulations 2080. According to the Act, Non-Resident Nepalis can acquire Non-Resident Nepali Citizenship as per Rule 8(a) of the Regulation. NRNs can also obtain an ID card which provides the rights to free visa, investment, property purchase, and repatriation in Nepal. A significant amount of permits for overseas employment have been issued in recent time for Nepalese citizens. This promotes immigration for a large part of the population to find work and higher levels of education or escaping political instability in the country, being major reasons for Nepalese immigrants to migrate in the first place.

== Notable persons ==
- Amrita Acharia, actress
- Asmita Ale, footballer
- Balram Chainrai, businessman
- Kiran Chetry, former CNN reporter
- Sudarshan Gautam
- Shesh Ghale, businessman
- Anish Giri, chess Grandmaster
- Anupama Aura Gurung, Miss Nepal
- Jamuna Gurung, entrepreneur, philanthropist
- Jassita Gurung, actress
- Lachhiman Gurung, Victoria Cross recipient, British Indian Army
- Prabal Gurung, fashion designer
- Prayashna Gurung, Miss Universe Nepal 2026
- Sipora Gurung, volleyball player
- Manisha Koirala, Bollywood film actress
- Siddharth Koirala, Bollywood and Nepali film actor
- Dichen Lachman, Australian actress
- Jiba Lamichhane, businessman, writer
- Teriya Magar, dancer
- Upendra Mahato, businessman and politician
- Hemant Mishra
- Resh Marhatta, actor in Nepali film industry
- Lujendra Ojha, scientist
- Dipprasad Pun, military
- Drona Prakash Rasali
- Dona Sarkar
- Jal Shah
- Santosh Shah, chef
- Sofia Shah, Danish/Nepalese athlete
- Shriya Shah-Klorfine
- Payal Shakya, Miss Nepal
- Sanu Sharma, Nepalese Australian writer
- Deepak Shimkhada
- Gaurika Singh, swimmer
- Amita Suman, Nepalese British actress
- Bhaskar Thapa, Nepali American architect
- Ram Pratap Thapa, Nepali German diplomat
- Manjushree Thapa, Canadian writer
- Samrat Upadhyay, author
- Daya Vaidya, actress
