= Nepalis =

People of Nepal

Nepalese
नेपाली
- Map of the Nepalese Citizens around the World residing for work or study

Regions with significant populations
- Nepal 29 million (2021 Census)
- India: 600,000
- Malaysia: 700,000 (2016)
- Qatar: 406,917
- Myanmar: 405,069
- Saudi Arabia: 334,451
- Japan: 273,229 (2025)
- United Arab Emirates: 224,905
- United States: 223,930 (2023)
- United Kingdom: 164,000(2018)
- Australia: 131,830(2020)
- Thailand: 100,000
- South Korea: 73,148
- Kuwait: 71,193
- Portugal: 51,000
- Bangladesh: 39,988
- Belgium: 25,472
- Canada: 21,975 (2021)
- Croatia: 20,000
- Bahrain: 20,000
- Oman: 17,057
- Mexico: 16,500
- Hong Kong: 15,950
- Denmark: 14,308
- Fiji: 10,000
- Germany: 7,000
- Brunei: 6,000
- Finland: 5,012
- Sri Lanka: 5,000
- Singapore: 5,000
- Poland: 4,400
- Spain: 4,000
- New Zealand: 3,630 (2018)[1]
- China: 3,500
- Libya: 3,064
- Philippines: 2,745 (2000 Philippines census)[1]
- Italy: 2,500[1]
- France: 2,000
- Netherlands: 2,000
- Norway: 2,000
- Vietnam: 2,000
- Brazil: 1,747
- Austria: 1,250
- Sweden: 1,000
- Switzerland: 1,000
- Czechia: 1,000
- Romania: 45000
- Pakistan: 1,000
- Bhutan: 242,000
- Taiwan: 167

Languages
- Languages of Nepal

Religion
- Hinduism (majority); Buddhism; Kirant; Islam; Christianity; Sikhism; Jainism; Others

Related ethnic groups
- Nepalese diaspora

Nepalese (Note: Nepali: नेपाली; Nepalese is spelled Nepalis as well. They are also known as Gorkhalis) are the citizens and nationals of the Federal Democratic Republic of Nepal under the Nepali nationality law. The term Nepali strictly refers to nationality, meaning people holding citizenship of Nepal. Conversely, people without Nepalese citizenship but with roots in Nepal (such as Nepalese Australians), who speak Nepali or any of the other 128 Nepali languages but hold foreign citizenship, are referred to as Nepali-language speaking Foreigners (Nepali: नेपाली भाषी विदेशी). The term Nepali is also not generally used to refer to non-citizen residents, dual citizens, or expatriates.

Nepal is a multicultural and multi-ethnic country. Bagmati Province is the most densely populated province, holding approximately 20.97 percent of Nepal's population.

== Nepali diaspora ==
The Nepali diaspora, or non-resident Nepalese, are Nepali people living overseas. The Non-resident Nepali Act, 2064 of Nepal defines a non-resident Nepalese as someone who is a foreign citizen of Nepali origin including a Nepali citizen residing abroad.

== Province division of Nepal ==
Source article: Administrative divisions of Nepal

Province	Capital	Districts	Area(km^{2})
Koshi	Biratnagar	14	25,905
Madhesh	Janakpur	8	9,661
Bagmati	Hetauda	13	20,300
Gandaki	Pokhara	11	21,504
Lumbini	Deukhuri	12	22,288
Karnali	Birendranagar	10	27,984
Sudurpashchim	Godawari	9	19,915

Notes:

1. There are currently 77 districts in Nepal; previously there were 75, but two districts were later divided.
2. Province 1 has the most districts (14), while Province 7 has the fewest.
3. Province 6 has the largest land area.

Map of provinces and districts of Nepal (2020). – Nepal issued a new map of Nepal including Kalapani and Lympiadhura.

== See also ==
- Nepal
- Ethnic groups in Nepal
- Languages of Nepal
- List of Nepali people
- Music of Nepal
- Religion in Nepal
- Demographics of Nepal
