= Demographics of Nepal =

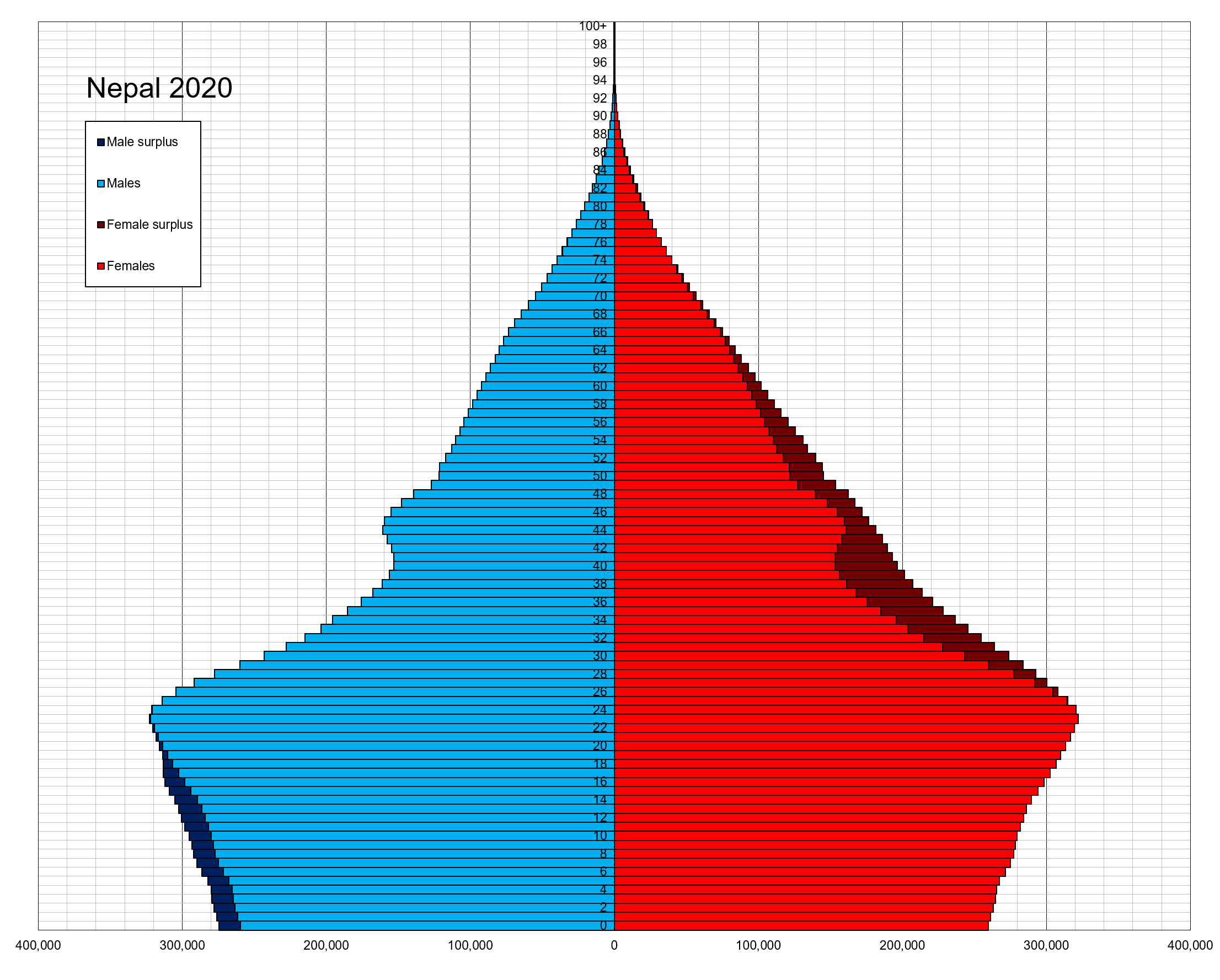
- Population pyramid of Nepal in 2020
- Population: 29,125,600 (2021)
- Growth rate: 0.92%
- Birth rate: 17.53 births/1,000 population
- Death rate: 5.58 deaths/1,000 population
- Life expectancy: 72.4 years
  - male: 71.66 years
  - female: 73.17 years
- Fertility rate: 1.9 children
- Infant mortality: 25.13 deaths/1,000 live births
- Net migration rate: -4.21 migrant(s)/1,000 population

Age structure
- 0–14 years: 28.41%
- 15–64 years: 65.69%
- 65 and over: 5.90%

Sex ratio
- Total: 0.96 male(s)/female (2022 est.)
- At birth: 1.06 male(s)/female

Nationality
- Nationality: Nepali
- Major ethnic: Khas (39.37%); Chhetri (16.60%); Brahmin (12.18%); Dalit (8.11%); Thakuri (1.61%); Dashnami (0.86%)
- Minor ethnic: Janajatis (30.81%); Hill (22.28%); Terai (8.53%); Madheshi (23.43%); Newars (5.50%); Other groups (0.32%); Unknown (1.07%)

Language
- Official: Nepali

Historical population of Nepal

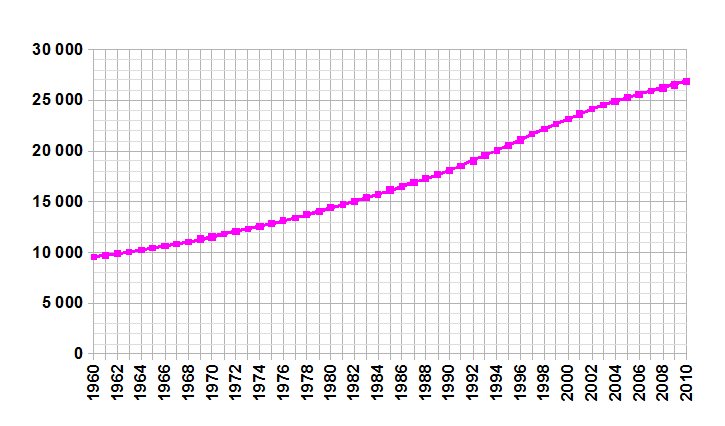
Population of Nepali (1960–2010 Nepal Census)

The current population of Nepal is 29,164,578 as per the 2021 census. The population growth rate is 0.92% per year.

In the 2011 census, Nepal's population was approximately 26 million people with a population growth rate of 1.35% and a median age of 21.6 years.

In 2016, the female median age was approximately 25 years old and the male median age was approximately 22 years old. Only 4.4% of the population is estimated to be more than 65 years old, comprising 681,252 females and 597,628 males. 61% of the population is between 15 and 64 years old, and 34.6% is younger than 14 years.

In 2011, the birth rate is estimated to be 22.17 births per 1,000 people with an infant mortality rate of 46 deaths per 1,000 live births. Compared to the infant mortality rate in 2006 of 48 deaths per 1000 live births, the 2011 IMR is a slight decrease within that 5-year period. Infant mortality rate in Nepal is higher in rural regions at 44 deaths per 1000 live births, whereas in urban regions the IMR is lower at 40 deaths per 1000 live births. This difference is due to a lack of delivery assistance services in rural communities compared to their urban counterparts who have better access to hospitals and neonatal clinics.

Life expectancy at birth is estimated to be 67.44 years for females and 64.94 years for males. The mortality rate is estimated to be 681 deaths per 100,000 people.

Net migration rate is estimated to be 61 migrants per 100,000 people.

According to the 2000 census, 65.9% of the total population is literate.

== Population growth ==
Historical population
Year	Pop.	±%
0	1,000,000	—
1000	1,500,000	+50.0%
1500	2,000,000	+33.3%
1600	2,500,000	+25.0%
1700	3,000,000	+20.0%
1800	4,000,000	+33.3%
1911	5,638,749	+41.0%
1920	5,573,788	−1.2%
1930	5,532,574	−0.7%
1941	6,283,649	+13.6%
1954	8,256,625	+31.4%
1961	9,412,996	+14.0%
1971	11,555,983	+22.8%
1981	15,022,839	+30.0%
1991	18,491,097	+23.1%
2001	23,151,423	+25.2%
2011	26,494,504	+14.4%
2021	29,164,578	+10.1%

The population of Nepal has been steadily rising in recent decades. In the June 2001 census, there was a population of about 23 million in Nepal. The population increased by 5 million from the preceding 1991 census; the growth rate is 2.3%. The current population is roughly 30 million which contributes to an increase of about 3 million people every 5 years.

Sixty caste and linguistic subgroups have formed throughout time with the waves of migration from Tibet and India. There was a moderate amount of immigration early in Nepal's history, then the population essentially remained the same without any significant fluctuations for over one hundred years. Natural disasters and the following government resettlement programs in the 1950s led to a spike in internal migration from the hills to the Terai region. In the 1980s the Western Chitwan Valley became a major transportation hub for all of Nepal. Along with this major change came a dramatic increase in government services, business expansion, and growing employment, especially in the agricultural industry. The valley's population grew rapidly through both in-migration and natural increase.

== Vital statistics ==
=== UN estimates ===
UN estimates
Year	Nos. in year			Rates per 1000			Total fertility rate	Infant mortality rate per 1000	Life expectancy (years)
Year	Live births	Deaths	Natural change	Crude birth rate	Crude death rate	Natural change	Total fertility rate	Infant mortality rate per 1000	Life expectancy (years)
1950	395,000	218,000	177,000	47.1	26.0	21.1	6.00	226.7	37.68
1951	404,000	222,000	181,000	47.0	25.9	21.1	6.02	226.0	37.75
1952	411,000	226,000	185,000	46.9	25.8	21.1	6.03	225.4	37.84
1953	418,000	231,000	187,000	46.7	25.8	20.9	6.04	225.0	37.87
1954	424,000	235,000	189,000	46.4	25.7	20.7	6.04	224.6	37.90
1955	428,000	238,000	190,000	46.1	25.6	20.5	6.03	224.0	37.98
1956	433,000	241,000	192,000	45.8	25.5	20.3	6.02	223.2	38.05
1957	438,000	244,000	194,000	45.4	25.3	20.1	6.01	222.2	38.14
1958	444,000	248,000	196,000	45.2	25.2	20.0	6.00	221.1	38.19
1959	449,000	250,000	199,000	44.9	25.0	19.9	5.99	219.4	38.41
1960	458,000	253,000	206,000	45.1	24.9	20.2	6.03	217.1	38.56
1961	468,000	255,000	213,000	45.1	24.6	20.5	6.06	214.4	38.86
1962	476,000	258,000	218,000	45.0	24.4	20.6	6.08	211.2	39.15
1963	483,000	260,000	223,000	44.8	24.1	20.7	6.07	207.5	39.45
1964	492,000	260,000	231,000	44.7	23.7	21.0	6.07	203.1	39.99
1965	498,000	261,000	237,000	44.3	23.3	21.1	6.03	198.7	40.45
1966	505,000	262,000	243,000	44.0	22.9	21.2	6.00	194.2	40.87
1967	513,000	263,000	251,000	43.8	22.4	21.4	5.98	189.7	41.40
1968	523,000	264,000	259,000	43.7	22.1	21.6	5.97	185.5	41.80
1969	529,000	264,000	265,000	43.3	21.6	21.7	5.91	181.1	42.33
1970	537,000	265,000	272,000	43.0	21.2	21.8	5.88	177.1	42.83
1971	546,000	265,000	280,000	42.7	20.8	21.9	5.84	172.9	43.31
1972	551,000	267,000	284,000	42.2	20.4	21.8	5.78	169.1	43.69
1973	554,000	268,000	287,000	41.6	20.1	21.5	5.69	165.5	44.04
1974	568,000	269,000	299,000	41.7	19.7	22.0	5.74	161.9	44.46
1975	579,000	269,000	310,000	41.6	19.3	22.3	5.75	158.2	45.04
1976	592,000	270,000	322,000	41.6	19.0	22.6	5.75	154.6	45.54
1977	601,000	271,000	330,000	41.3	18.6	22.7	5.73	150.9	46.01
1978	614,000	270,000	344,000	41.2	18.1	23.1	5.72	147.0	46.68
1979	625,000	270,000	355,000	41.0	17.7	23.3	5.69	142.9	47.27
1980	632,000	269,000	363,000	40.5	17.2	23.3	5.64	139.0	47.89
1981	645,000	269,000	375,000	40.4	16.9	23.5	5.60	135.4	48.39
1982	658,000	269,000	388,000	40.2	16.5	23.7	5.58	130.9	48.94
1983	672,000	270,000	401,000	40.1	16.1	24.0	5.56	126.8	49.43
1984	686,000	268,000	418,000	40.0	15.6	24.4	5.54	122.7	50.23
1985	695,000	266,000	429,000	39.6	15.2	24.4	5.47	118.6	50.88
1986	706,000	264,000	441,000	39.3	14.7	24.6	5.42	114.3	51.54
1987	717,000	259,000	457,000	39.0	14.1	24.9	5.36	110.2	52.48
1988	726,000	258,000	469,000	38.7	13.7	25.0	5.31	105.7	53.07
1989	735,000	251,000	484,000	38.3	13.1	25.3	5.25	101.0	54.13
1990	748,000	248,000	499,000	38.1	12.7	25.5	5.21	96.5	54.83
1991	757,000	244,000	513,000	37.6	12.1	25.5	5.14	92.1	55.71
1992	768,000	239,000	529,000	37.1	11.6	25.6	5.04	87.6	56.71
1993	791,000	236,000	555,000	37.1	11.1	26.1	5.00	83.8	57.62
1994	795,000	230,000	565,000	36.4	10.5	25.9	4.91	79.4	58.55
1995	797,000	226,000	571,000	35.6	10.1	25.5	4.79	75.6	59.32
1996	787,000	222,000	565,000	34.5	9.7	24.7	4.60	72.1	59.98
1997	773,000	216,000	557,000	33.2	9.3	23.9	4.39	68.3	60.77
1998	768,000	210,000	558,000	32.3	8.8	23.5	4.24	65.2	61.55
1999	760,000	207,000	553,000	31.4	8.5	22.8	4.08	61.8	62.11
2000	754,000	204,000	550,000	30.6	8.3	22.3	3.94	58.7	62.61
2001	739,000	199,000	540,000	29.5	7.9	21.6	3.76	55.8	63.34
2002	724,000	202,000	522,000	28.5	8.0	20.5	3.59	53.2	63.26
2003	719,000	196,000	523,000	27.9	7.6	20.3	3.46	50.5	64.20
2004	707,000	192,000	515,000	27.1	7.4	19.7	3.31	48.1	64.82
2005	687,000	188,000	499,000	26.0	7.1	18.9	3.14	46.0	65.46
2006	666,000	187,000	479,000	25.0	7.0	18.0	2.97	44.1	65.87
2007	650,000	185,000	465,000	24.2	6.9	17.3	2.86	42.2	66.33
2008	637,000	188,000	449,000	23.6	6.9	16.6	2.74	40.1	66.42
2009	625,000	187,000	438,000	23.0	6.9	16.1	2.63	38.3	66.76
2010	617,000	191,000	426,000	22.6	7.0	15.6	2.54	36.7	66.81
2011	614,000	189,000	425,000	22.4	6.9	15.5	2.46	35.1	67.31
2012	615,000	192,000	423,000	22.3	7.0	15.4	2.42	33.7	67.47
2013	613,000	190,000	423,000	22.2	6.9	15.4	2.36	32.2	67.97
2014	614,000	193,000	421,000	22.2	7.0	15.2	2.32	30.6	68.09
2015	611,000	204,000	407,000	22.1	7.4	14.7	2.27	29.6	67.46
2016	607,000	193,000	414,000	21.8	6.9	14.8	2.23	27.7	68.78
2017	603,000	197,000	407,000	21.4	7.0	14.4	2.17	26.6	68.91
2018	600,000	201,000	399,000	21.1	7.1	14.1	2.12	25.5	68.98
2019	602,000	198,000	404,000	20.6	7.0	13.6	2.08	24.5	69.56
2020	603,000	210,000	392,000	20.2	7.3	12.9	2.05	23.8	69.25
2021	610,000	232,000	377,000	19.7	7.8	11.9	2.03	22.8	68.45
2022	583,699	204,694	379,005	19.6	6.9	12.8	2.00		
2023	574,297	205,841	368,456	19.3	6.9	12.4	1.98		
2024	562,232	206,740	355,492	19.0	7.0	12.0	1.96		
2025	551,647	207,032	344,615	18.6	7.0	11.6	1.94		
2026				18.3	7.0	11.3	1.92		

CBR = crude birth rate (per 1000); CDR = crude death rate (per 1000); NC = natural change (per 1000); TFR = total fertility rate (number of children per woman); IMR = infant mortality rate per 1000 births

Source: UN DESA, World Population Prospects, 2022

=== Structure of the population ===
Structure of the population (22.06.2011) (Census):

Age group	Male	Female	Total	%
Total	12 849 041	13 645 463	26 494 504	100
0–4	1 314 957	1 253 006	2 567 963	9.69
5–9	1 635 176	1 569 683	3 204 859	12.10
10–14	1 764 630	1 710 794	3 475 424	13.12
15–19	1 443 191	1 488 789	2 931 980	11.07
20–24	1 043 981	1 314 090	2 358 071	8.90
25–29	917 243	1 162 111	2 079 354	7.85
30–34	770 577	964 728	1 735 305	6.55
35–39	740 200	864 119	1 604 319	6.06
40–44	660 290	725 831	1 386 121	5.23
45–49	575 101	597 858	1 172 959	4.43
50–54	505 864	499 612	1 005 476	3.80
55–59	412 892	405 371	818 263	3.09
60–64	368 451	388 376	756 827	2.86
65–69	277 782	276 667	554 449	2.09
70–74	199 610	195 543	395 153	1.49
75–79	117 358	117 777	235 135	0.89
80–84	62 787	65 990	128 777	0.49
85–89	25 810	26 716	52 526	0.20
90–94	8 940	11 395	20 335	0.08
95+	4 201	7 007	11 208	0.04
Age group	Male	Female	Total	Percent
0–14	4 714 763	4 533 483	9 248 246	34.91
15–64	7 437 790	8 410 885	15 848 675	59.82
65+	696 488	701 095	1 397 583	5.27

Population estimates by sex and age group (01.VII.2016) (based on the results of the 2011 Population Census)

Age group	Male	Female	Total	%
Total	13 784 009	14 647 486	28 431 494	100
0–4	1 525 630	1 424 537	2 950 167	10.38
5–9	1 368 495	1 305 783	2 674 278	9.41
10–14	1 564 080	1 498 784	3 062 865	10.77
15–19	1 680 525	1 636 790	3 317 315	11.67
20–24	1 476 611	1 545 309	3 021 919	10.63
25–29	1 033 222	1 307 709	2 340 931	8.23
30–34	860 512	1 138 303	1 998 816	7.03
35–39	771 970	968 815	1 740 784	6.12
40–44	691 192	830 797	1 521 989	5.35
45–49	632 128	701 958	1 334 086	4.69
50–54	552 834	587 346	1 140 179	4.01
55–59	462 675	468 275	930 950	3.27
60–64	382 738	387 360	770 098	2.71
65–69	303 255	324 567	627 821	2.21
70–74	231 131	251 818	482 949	1.70
75–79	162 123	177 791	339 914	1.20
80+	84 889	91 543	176 432	0.62
Age group	Male	Female	Total	Percent
0–14	4 458 205	4 229 104	8 687 309	30.56
15–64	8 544 406	9 572 663	18 117 069	63.72
65+	781 398	845 719	1 627 117	5.72

Population estimates by sex and age group (01.VII.2021) (based on the results of the 2011 Population Census)

Age group	Male	Female	Total	%
Total	14 734 201	15 643 853	30 378 055	100
0–4	1 575 174	1 459 441	3 034 615	9.99
5–9	1 515 051	1 414 346	2 929 396	9.64
10–14	1 364 270	1 301 906	2 666 176	8.78
15–19	1 549 116	1 493 723	3 042 838	10.02
20–24	1 646 148	1 627 247	3 273 395	10.78
25–29	1 437 092	1 531 252	2 968 344	9.77
30–34	1 002 200	1 293 007	2 295 206	7.56
35–39	835 668	1 124 125	1 959 793	6.45
40–44	749 759	954 458	1 704 217	5.61
45–49	668 244	814 481	1 482 726	4.88
50–54	604 753	682 332	1 287 085	4.24
55–59	518 686	563 320	1 082 006	3.56
60–64	420 366	439 121	859 487	2.83
65-69	330 597	348 942	679 539	2.24
70-74	241 518	272 499	514 018	1.69
75-79	160 174	186 318	346 493	1.14
80+	115 385	137 335	252 721	0.83
Age group	Male	Female	Total	Percent
0–14	4 454 495	4 175 693	8 630 188	28.41
15–64	9 432 032	10 523 066	19 955 098	65.69
65+	847 674	945 094	1 792 768	5.90

=== Life expectancy ===
Historical development of life expectancy in Nepal

Period	Life expectancy in years	Period	Life expectancy in years
1950–1955	34.0	1985–1990	52.1
1955–1960	34.6	1990–1995	56.4
1960–1965	36.2	1995–2000	60.5
1965–1970	39.1	2000–2005	64.0
1970–1975	42.0	2005–2010	66.7
1975–1980	44.9	2010–2015	68.9
1980–1985	48.3		

Source: UN World Population Prospects

=== Demographic and health survey ===
Total fertility rate (TFR) (wanted fertility rate) and crude birth rate (CBR):

Year	Total		Urban		Rural	
Year	CBR	TFR	CBR	TFR	CBR	TFR
1996	37	4.64 (2.9)	27	2.85 (1.9)	38	4.83 (3.1)
2001	33.5	4.1 (2.5)	20.6	2.1 (1.4)	34.9	4.4 (2.6)
2006	28.4	3.1 (2.0)	21.9	2.1 (1.4)	29.5	3.3 (2.1)
2011	24.3	2.6 (1.8)	16.6	1.6 (1.2)	25.5	2.8 (1.8)
2016	22.4	2.3 (1.7)	19.9	2.0 (1.5)	26.3	2.9 (2.1)
2022	20.0	2.1 (1.7)	19.3	2.0 (1.6)	21.4	2.4 (1.8)

The following demographic statistics are from the 2011 Nepal Demographic and Health Survey (NDHS).

Median birth intervals (median number of months since preceding birth)

Total: 36.2
Rural: 35.9
Urban: 40.3 (2011)

Median age at first birth

Median age: 20.1 (2011)

Fertility rate – past trend and present

Years	1925	1926	1927	1928	1929	1930	1931	1932	1933	1934
Total fertility rate in Nepal	6.15	6.14	6.14	6.13	6.12	6.12	6.11	6.11	6.10	6.09

Years	1935	1936	1937	1938	1939	1940	1941	1942	1943	1944
Total fertility rate in Nepal	6.09	6.08	6.07	6.07	6.06	6.06	6.05	6.04	6.04	6.03

Years	1945	1946	1947	1948	1949
Total fertility rate in Nepal	6.02	6.02	6.01	6.00	6.00

Total fertility rate: 4.6 children born/woman (1996)
Total fertility rate: 4.1 children born/woman (2001)
Total fertility rate: 3.1 children born/woman (2006)

Total fertility rate: 2.6 children born/woman
Rural fertility rate: 2.8 children born/woman
Urban fertility rate: 1.6 children born/woman (2011)

Ideal family size – mean ideal number of children

Overall (female/male): 2.1 / 2.3
Currently married (female/male): 2.2 / 2.3
Urban (female/male): 1.9 / 2.0
Rural (female/male): 2.2 / 2.3 (2011)

Ideal family size by gender and age group

Below is a table of the ideal family size by gender and age for 2011.

Age	Women	Men
15–19	1.9	2.2
20–24	1.9	2.1
25–29	2.1	2.1
30–34	2.2	2.3
35–39	2.3	2.4
40–44	2.5	2.4
45–49	2.6	2.6

== Height of People ==
Height of General Population

The "2005 STEPS Country Report Nepal" by World Health Organization sampled adults aged 25-34 from llam, Lalitpur, & Tanahu which collected an average height of 163.4 cm (5'4.3) for males and 152 cm (4'11.8) for females. A 2021 study in Pokhara sampled adults aged 25-40 which collected an average height of 163.1 cm (5'4.3) for males and 151.5 (4'11.5) for females. A 2014 study in Birgunj sampled adults aged 25-45 which collected an average height of 167.4 cm (5'5.9) for males and 155.6 cm (5'1.3) in females.

Height of Gen Z College Students

A 2025 study sampled students aged 18-25 in Nepal Medical College which collected an average height of 170.4 cm (5'7.1) for males and 158.3 cm (5'2.3) for females. A 2025 study sampled students aged 18-24 in Devdaha Medical College which collected an average height of 170.2 cm (5'7.0) for males and 159 cm (5'2.6) for females. A 2025 study sampled students in Birat Medical College Teaching Hospital which collected an average height of 171.4 cm (5'7.5) for males and 156.7 cm ( 5'1.7) for females.

Location	Date Published	Age Range	Male	Female	Sample Size
Nepal Medical College	2025	18-25	170.4 cm (5'7.1)	158.3 cm (5'2.3)	Total:153
Devdaha Medical College	2025	18-24	170.2 cm (5'7.0)	159 cm (5'2.6)	Male:115; Female:80; Total:195
Birat Medical College Teaching Hospital	2025	Student	171.4 cm (5'7.5)	156.7 cm (5'1.7)	Male:67; Female:68; Total:135
Manipal Teaching Hospital	2021	18-65	163.3 cm (5'4.3)	154.5 cm (5'0.8)	Male:180; Female:180; Total:360
Pokhara	2021	25-40	163.1 cm (5'4.2)	151.5 cm (4'11.6)	Male:161; Female:160; Total: 321
Nepal Medical College	2020	17-23	173.0 cm (5'8.1)	160.0 cm (5'3.0)	Male:152; Female:71; Total:223
Lumbini Medical College	2020	18-24	174.5 cm (5'8.7)	156 cm (5'1.4)	Male:57; Female:43; Total:100
Birat Medical College Teaching Hospital	2019	18-25	165.4 cm (5'5.1)	156.5 cm (5'1.6)	Male:100; Female:100; Total: 200
Birgunj	2014	25-45	167.4 cm (5'5.9)	155.6 cm (5'1.3)	Male: 225; Female:175; Total:400
Kathmandu University School of Medical Sciences	2012	17-25	165.6 cm (5'5.2)	156.7 cm (5'1.7)	Male: 258; Female:182; Total:440
llam, Lalitpur, & Tanahu	2006	25-34	163.4 cm (5'4.3)	152 cm (4'11.8)	Male:862; Female:1,576; Total:2438

== Ethnic and regional equity ==
Ethnic groups of Nepal (2021)
1. Chhetri (16.4%)
2. Bahun (11.3%)
3. Magar (6.90%)
4. Tharu (6.20%)
5. Tamang (5.62%)
6. Kami (5.04%)
7. Muslim (4.86%)
8. Newar (4.60%)
9. Yadav (4.21%)
10. Rai (2.20%)
11. Damai (1.94%)
12. Gurung (1.86%)
13. Thakuri (1.70%)
14. Sarki (1.55%)
15. Teli (1.48%)
16. Limbu (1.42%)
17. Chamar (1.35%)
18. Koeri (1.22%)
19. Other (20.1%)

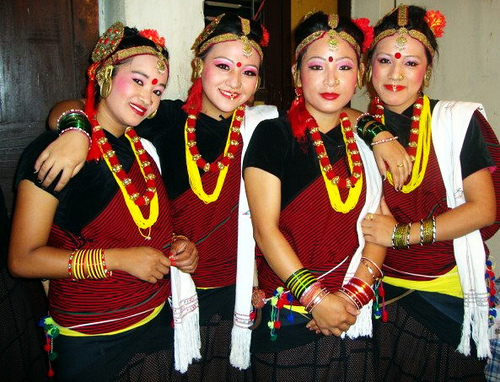
Magar girls of Nepal

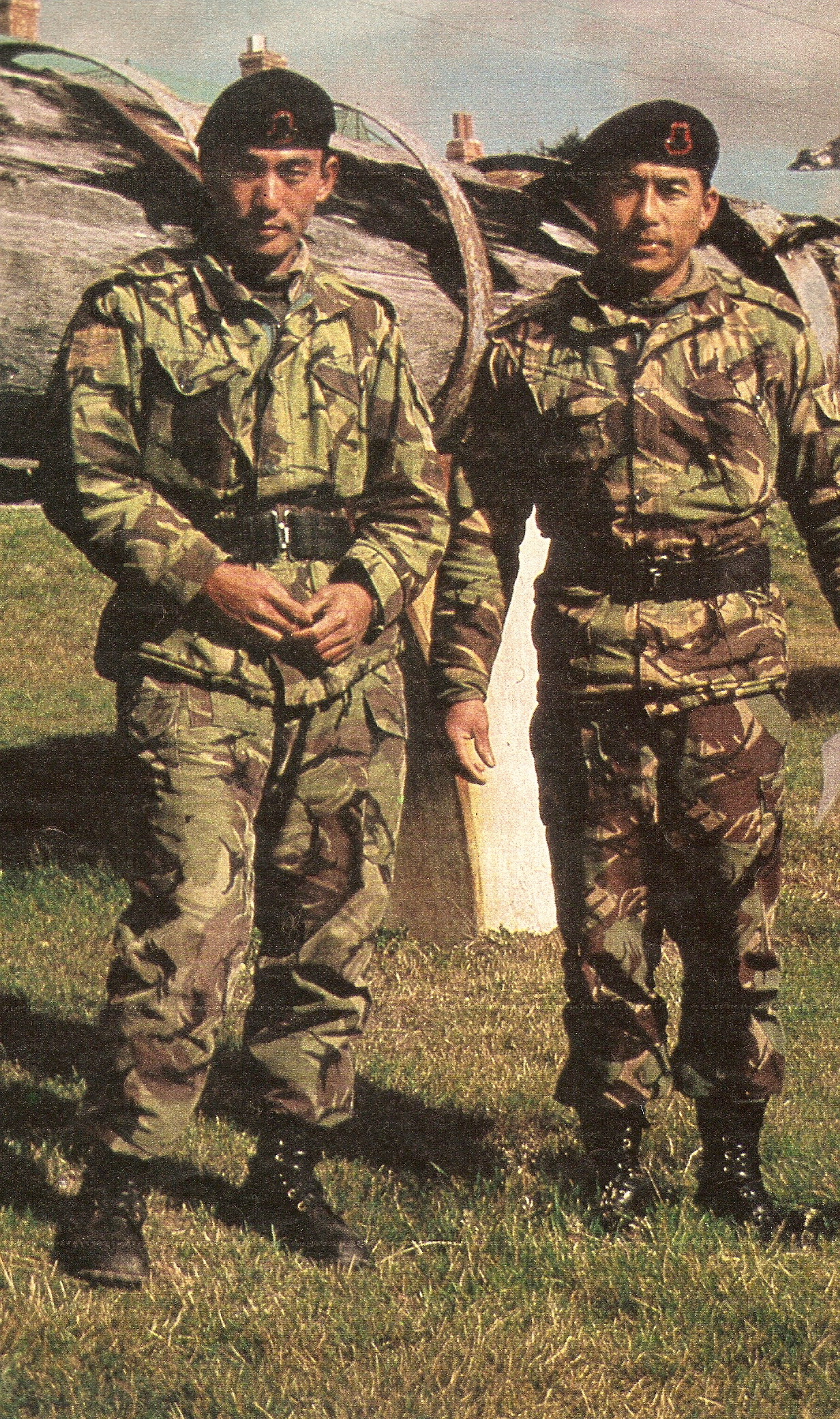
Nepalese Gurkhas

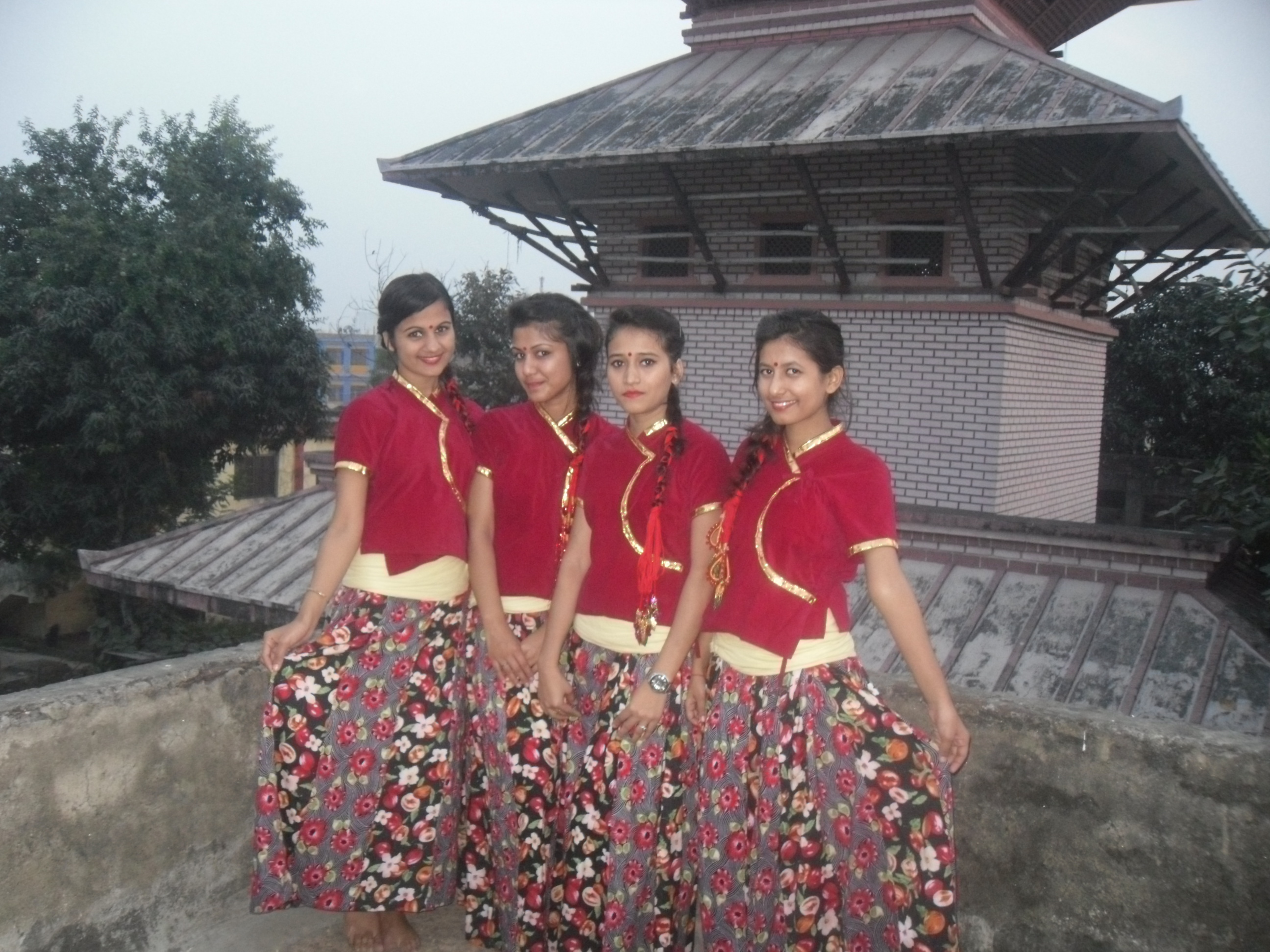
Hill Brahmin girls in traditional attire

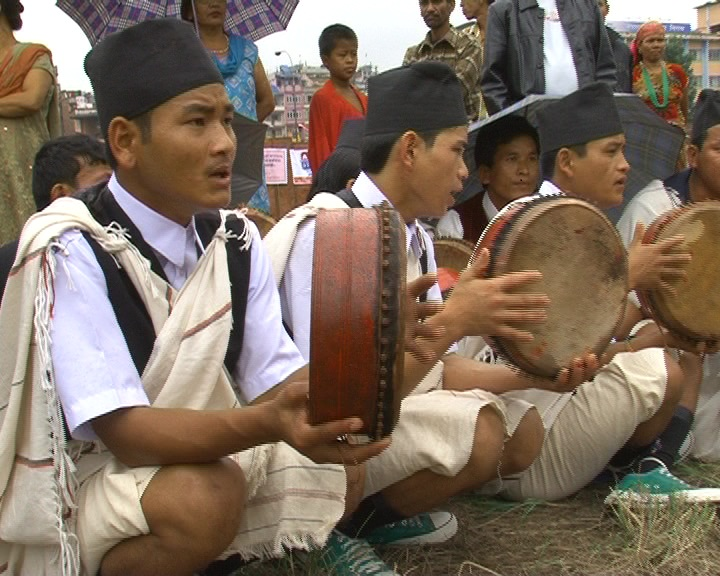
Magar men playing their traditional instrument,khaijadi

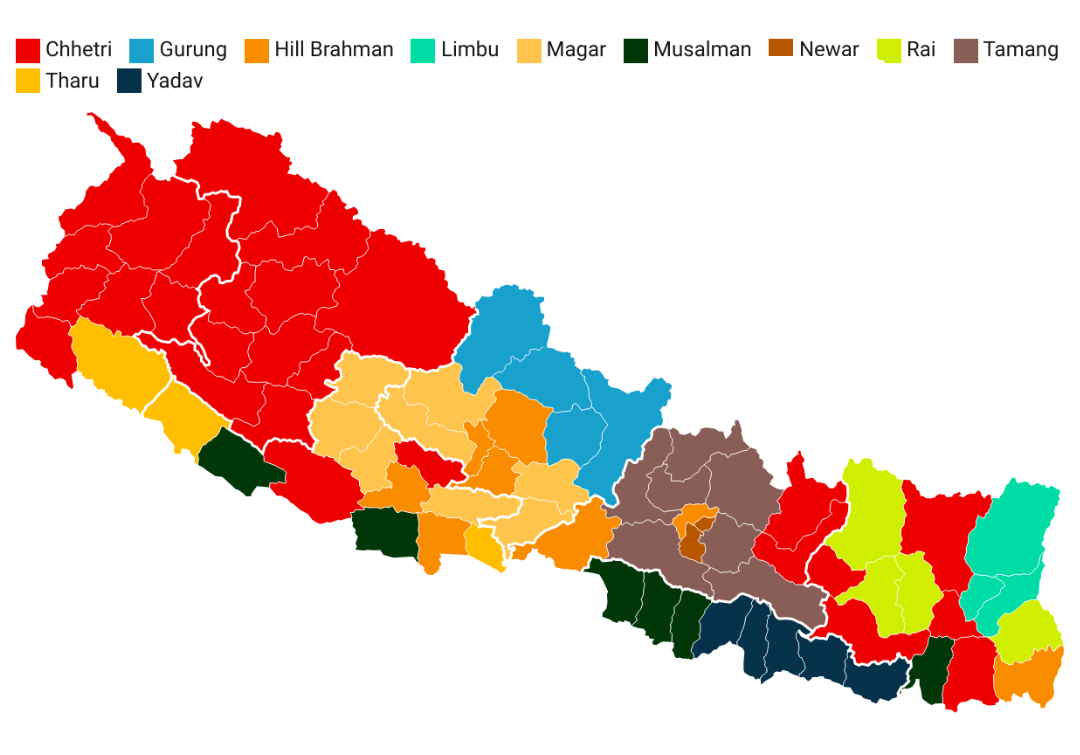
Ethnicities & castes in Nepal districts

Nepali was the national language and Sanskrit became a required school subject. Children who spoke Nepali natively and who were exposed to Sanskrit had much better chances of passing the national examinations at the end of high school, which meant they had better employment prospects and could continue into higher education. Children who natively spoke local languages of the Madhesh and Hills, or Tibetan dialects prevailing in the high mountains were at a considerable disadvantage.

This history of exclusion coupled with poor prospects for improvement created grievances that encouraged many in ethnic communities such as Madhesi and Tharu in the Tharuhat and Madhesh and Kham Magar in the mid-western hills to support the Unified Communist Party of Nepal (Maoist) and various other armed Maoist opposition groups such as the JTMM during and after the Nepali Civil War. The negotiated end to this war forced King Gyanendra to abdicate in 2008.

Issues of ethnic and regional equity have tended to dominate the agenda of the new republican government and continue to be divisive. Today, even after the end of a 10-year-old Maoist conflict, the upper caste dominates every field in Nepal. Although Newars are low in numbers, their urban living habitat gives them a competitive advantage. Kayastha of Madhesh are the toppers in Human Development Index.

From a gender perspective, Newari women are the most literate and lead in every sector. Brahmin and Chhetri women have experienced less social and economic mobility compared to Newari women. Specifically, Brahmin women experience less equality due to their predominately rural living conditions which deprives them of access to certain educational and healthcare advantages.

== Languages ==
1. Nepali (44.6%)
2. Maithili (11.7%)
3. Bhojpuri (5.98%)
4. Tharu (5.77%)
5. Tamang (5.11%)
6. Newar (3.20%)
7. Bajjika (2.99%)
8. Magar (2.98%)
9. Doteli (2.97%)
10. Urdu (2.61%)
11. Awadhi (1.89%)
12. Limbu (1.30%)
13. Gurung (1.23%)
14. Baitadeli (1.03%)
15. Others (6.63%)

Nepal's diverse linguistic heritage evolved from three major language groups: Indo-Aryan, Tibeto-Burman languages, and various indigenous language isolates. According to the 2001 national census, 92 different living languages are spoken in Nepal (a 93rd category was "unspecified"). Based upon the 2011 census, the major languages spoken in Nepal (percentage spoken out of the mother tongue language) includes:

Nepali (derived from Khas bhasa) is an Indo-Aryan language and is written in Devanagari script. Nepali was the language of the house of Gorkhas in the late 18th century and became the official, national language that serves as the lingua franca among Nepali of different ethnolinguistic groups. Maithili, Bhojpuri, Bajjika and Awadhi languages are spoken in the southern Terai. There has been a surge in the number and percentage of people who understand English. The majority of the urban and a significant number of the rural schools are English-medium schools. Higher education in technical, medical, scientific and engineering fields are entirely in English. Nepal Bhasa, the mother-tongue of the Newars, is widely used and spoken in and around Kathmandu Valley and in major Newar trade towns across Nepal.

Other languages, particularly in the Inner Terai hill and mountain regions, are remnants of the country's pre-unification history of dozens of political entities isolated by mountains and gorges. These languages typically are limited to an area spanning about one day's walk. Beyond that distance, dialects and languages lose mutual intelligibility. However, there are some major languages spoken by indigenous peoples in the region: Magar and Gurung in the west-central hills, Tamang in the east-centre and Limbu in the east. In the high Himalayas are spoken various Tibetan languages, including Bhotia.

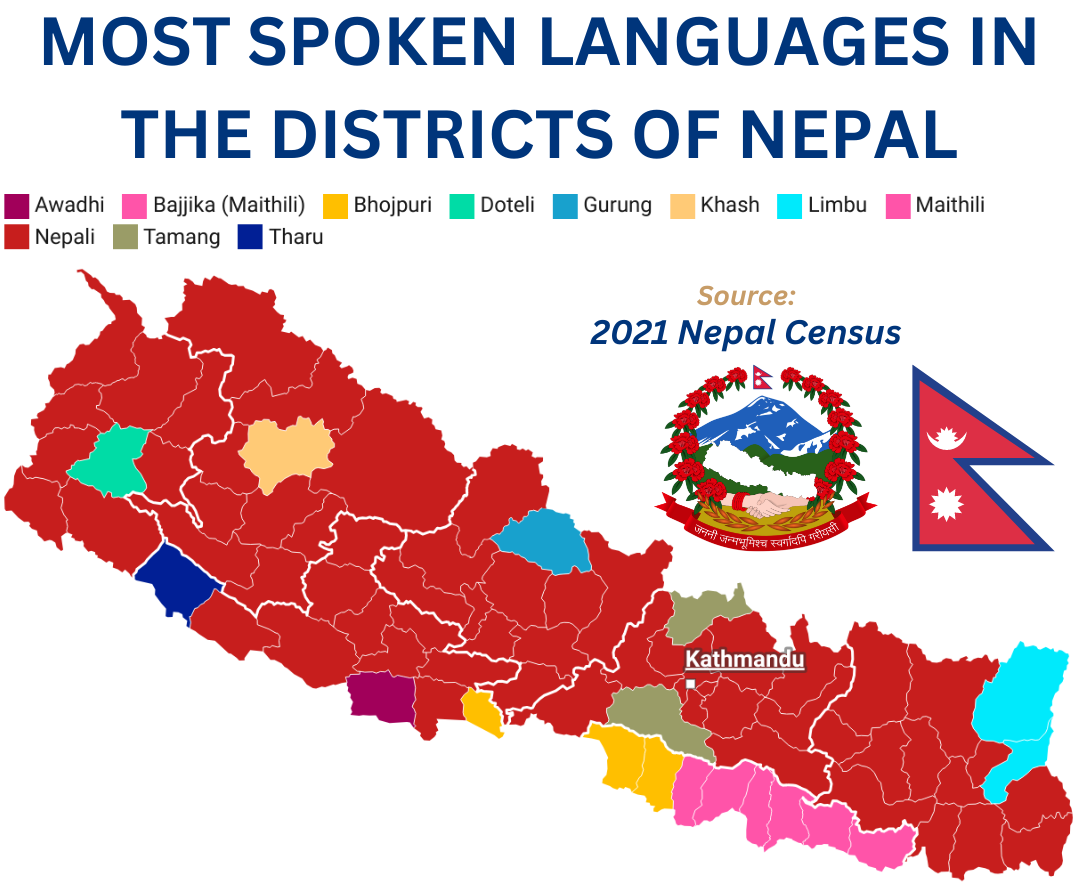
Most spoken languages in Nepal (2021)

Since Nepal's unification, various indigenous languages have come under threat of extinction as the government of Nepal has marginalized their use through strict policies designed to promote Nepali as the official language. Indigenous languages which have gone extinct or are critically threatened include Byangsi, Chonkha, and Longaba. Since democracy was restored in 1990, however, the government has worked to improve the marginalization of these languages. Tribhuvan University began surveying and recording threatened languages in 2010 and the government intends to use this information to include more languages on the next Nepali census.

== Religion ==
Religion in Nepal (2021 census)
1. Hinduism (81.2%)
2. Buddhism (8.21%)
3. Islam (5.09%)
4. Kirat Mundhum (3.17%)
5. Christianity (1.76%)
6. Other (0.90%)

As of the 2021 census, 81.19% of the Nepali population was Hindu, 8.21% Buddhist, 5.09% Muslim, 3.17% Kiratist/Yumaist, 1.76% Christian, and 0.9% followed other or no religion.

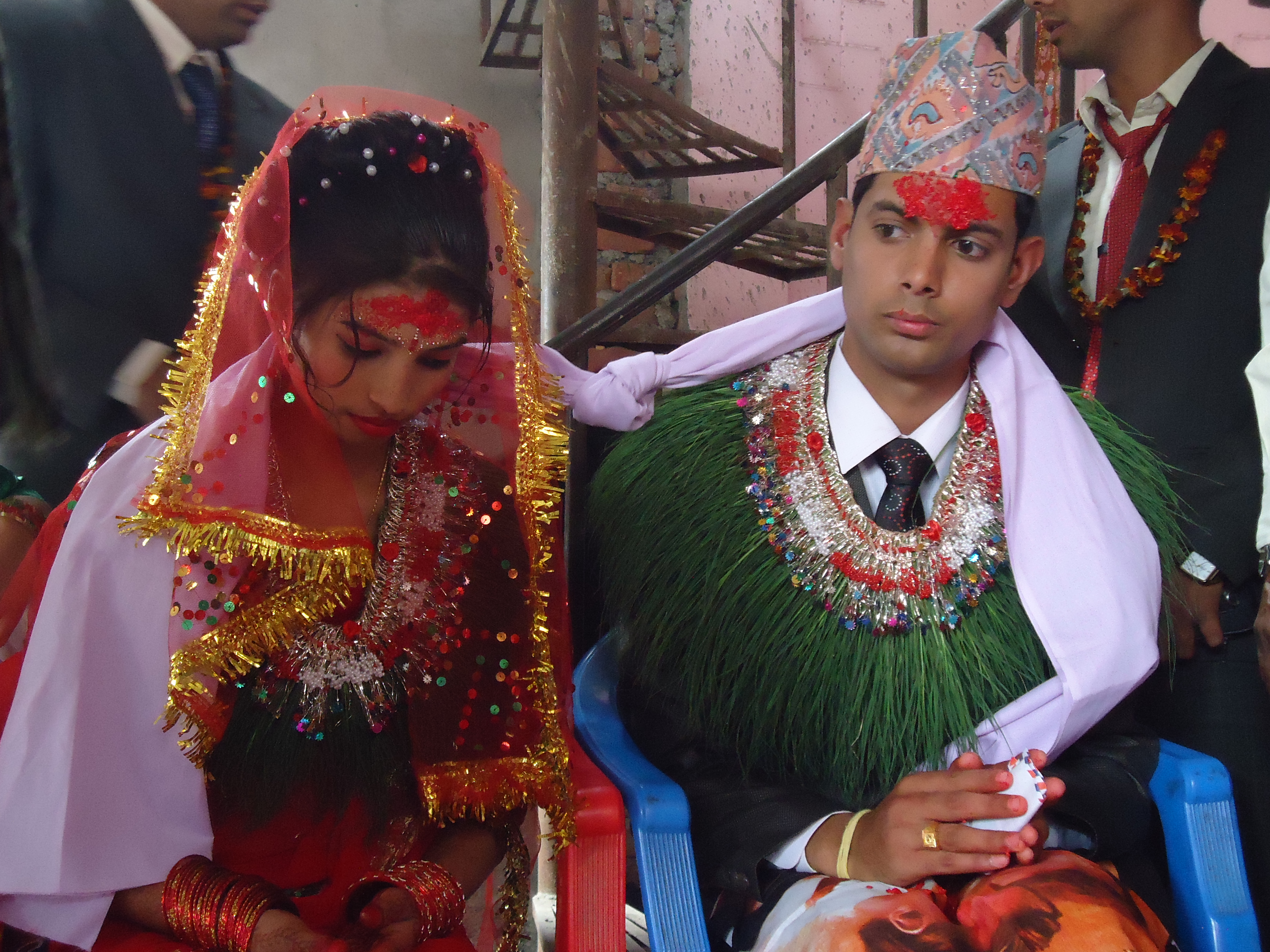
Nepali Hindu bride and groom

Nepal defines itself as a secular nation according to Constitution of Nepal It is common for many Hindus in the country to also worship Buddhist deities simultaneously with Hindu traditions. The notion of religion in Nepal is more fluid than other countries, particularly Western countries. The Nepali people build their social networks through their religious celebrations, which are a central part to the whole of communities within the country.

There is a general idea held by the Nepali people that there is an omnipotent, transcendental "moral order" that is sacred to Hinduism. This idea exists along with the constant presence of chaos and disorder in the material world. In the northwestern region of the country, this all-encompassing state of disorder in the world is synonymous with human affliction, which the religious shamans are believed to alleviate.

Kathmandu Valley is home to the Newars, a major ethnic group in Nepal. The city Bhaktapur is located inside of Kathmandu Valley. Bhaktapur was once an independent Hindu Kingdom. Individual homes typically have at least one shrine devoted to personal deities, with an altar displaying flowers, fruit, and oil among other offerings to the Gods. The perimeter of Kathmandu Valley is lined with shrines devoted to Hindu goddesses, whose purpose is to protect the city from chaotic events. At least one shrine can be found on the vast majority of streets in Kathmandu. The people of Nepal do not feel the need to segregate or compete based upon religion, so Hindu and Buddhist shrines are often coexisting in the same areas. The areas outside of the city are perceived to always possess some form of wild or disordered nature, so the Nepali people inside of the city lines regularly worship the Hindu gods through public ceremonies.

The Hindu god Vishnu is believed to symbolise moral order in the Newar society. The natural human shortcomings in maintaining this moral order is believed to be represented by the Hindu god Shiva. The destruction of Shiva is neutralised by the preserver Vishnu, who tips the scales to restore order. In recent times, there has been a rise in political violence, specifically Maoist violence. This increased violence, along with the widespread poverty, has caused the Nepali to seek stability and peace in religion.

Nepal's constitution continues long-standing legal provisions prohibiting discrimination against other religions (but also proselytization). The king was deified as the earthly manifestation of the Hindu god Vishnu. On May 19, 2006, the government faced a constitutional crisis, the House of Representatives which had been just reformed, having been previously dissolved, declared Nepal a "secular state".

The 2001 census identified 80.6% of the population as Hindu and 10.7% as Buddhist (although many people labeled Hindu or Buddhist often practice a syncretic blend of Hinduism, Buddhism, or animist traditions), 4.2% of the population was Muslim, 3.6% of the population followed the indigenous Kirat Mundhum religion and Christianity was practiced by 0.45% of the population.

Buddhist and Hindu shrines and festivals are respected and celebrated by most Nepali. Certain animist practises of old indigenous religions continue to survive to the modern era.

== Emigration ==
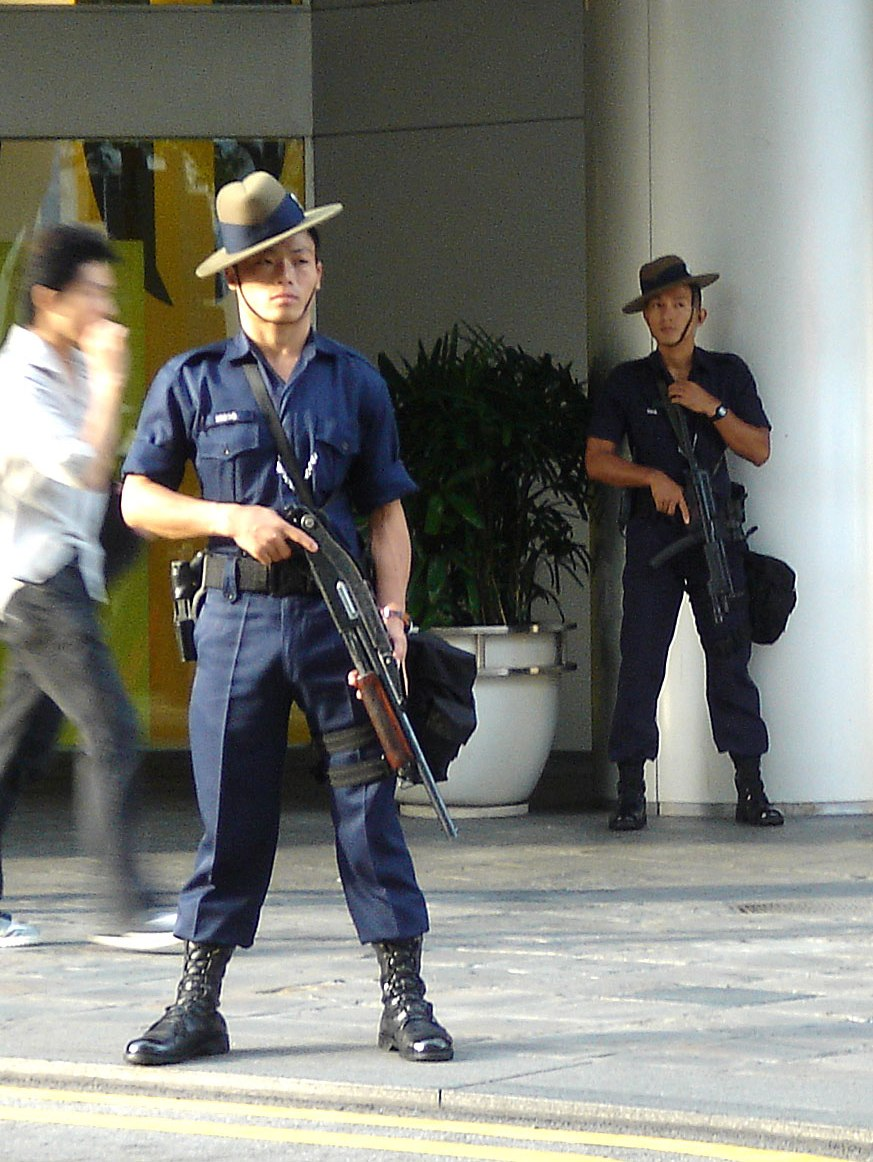
Gurkhas in Singapore

=== Nepali in the United Kingdom ===
In the 2001 census, approximately 6,000 Nepali were living in the UK. According to latest figure from Office for National Statistics estimates that 51,000 Nepal-born people are currently resident in the UK. There has been increasing interest in the opportunities offered in the UK by the Nepali, especially education. Between the years of 2001 to 2006, there were 7,500 applications for student visas.

=== Nepali in Hong Kong ===
The Nepali people residing in Hong Kong are primarily made up of children of ex-Gurkhas; born in Hong Kong during their parents' service with the British Army's Brigade of Gurkhas, which was based in Hong Kong from the 1970s until the handover. Large groups of Nepali people can be found in Shek Kong and Yuen Long District off of the main bases of the British army. Many ex-Gurkhas remained in Hong Kong after the end of their service under the sponsorship of their Hong Kong-born children, who held right of abode.

Nepali of middle age or older in Hong Kong are predominantly found in security, while those of younger generations are predominantly found in the business industry.

Mostly the people from Kirati ethnic groups such as Rai and Limbu are the ones residing in Hong Kong and other neighbouring nations such as Singapore and Japan.

=== Nepali overseas ===
Nepali migrants abroad have suffered tremendous hardships, including some 7,500 deaths in the Middle East and Malaysia alone since the year 2000, some 3,500 in Saudi Arabia.

Overseas Nepali population
Country	Population (thousands)
India	2,926
United Arab Emirates	400
Saudi Arabia	297
Australia	219
United States	205
Qatar	200
Japan	156
United Kingdom	62
Iraq	30
South Korea	22
Hong Kong	16
Canada	14
Malaysia	6
Singapore	4
China	3.5
Approx. total	2,355

== Immigration ==
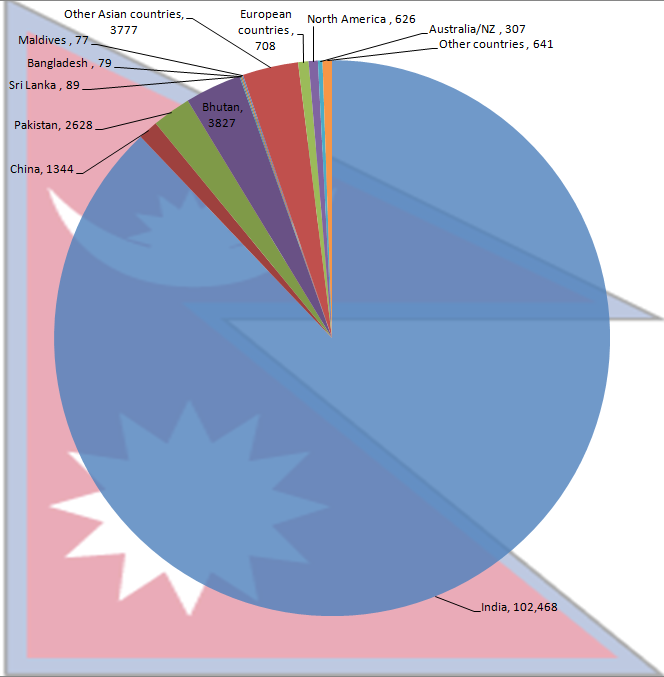
Foreign population in Nepal as per census of 2001

According to the 2001 census, there were 116,571 foreign born citizens in Nepal; 90% of them were of Indian origin followed by Bhutan, Pakistan and China. This number does not include the refugees from Bhutan and Tibet, nor does it include 4 million indian immigrants who were given Nepali citizenship in 2008 after the promulgation of the New Constitution of Nepal.

== See also ==
- Ethnic groups in Nepal
