= Nepalis in Bangladesh =

Nepali diaspora in Bangladesh

Regions with significant populations
- Dhaka

Languages
- Bengali · Nepali

Religion
- Hinduism

Related ethnic groups
- Nepali people

There is a small community of Nepalis in Bangladesh who are mostly descendants of Gorkha soldiers who were taken there by East-India company in around the 1870s. Though many of the Gorkha soldiers returned to Nepal, some chose to stay in Bangladesh.

== Overview ==
Many Nepalis fled their home country around the 1950s. To escape the demands of the state and enhance their standard of living, they settled in various parts of North India, as well as the neighboring countries of Burma, Bhutan and Bangladesh.

Most of the Nepalis in Bangladesh are farmers, living in small villages situated near rivers or springs. The better-off Nepalis own their land, and raise wet rice during the monsoon season. They raise dry rice, maize, and wheat in the summer and winter months. The Nepalese also cultivate vegetable gardens to feed their families. Most farmers also raise cows for the family's milk and goats and buffalo for meat. The Hindu caste structure keeps the Nepalis in one of two categories, upper caste landowners and lower caste servants.

In recent years, many of the Nepalis have now moved into the cities. Unfortunately, most of the urban population live in run-down houses with very poor sanitation and no modern conveniences. They usually work in local businesses, as merchants or for the government. There are also a number of students from Nepal studying in Dhaka. There are about 300 Nepalese students in University of Science and Technology in Chittagong.

== See also ==
- Bangladesh–Nepal relations
- Nepalis in Pakistan
