= Hinduism in Saudi Arabia =

Hindus in Saudi Arabia
Total population
- 708,000 (2020) ▲1.3% of total population

Regions with significant populations
- All Over Saudi Arabia

Religions
- Hinduism

Related ethnic groups
- Indians in Saudi Arabia and Hindus

Hinduism is the 3rd largest religion in Saudi Arabia, followed by nearly 1.3% of total population residing in the nation. As of 2020, there were nearly 708,000 Hindus residing in Saudi Arabia, among whom most of them were Indians and Nepalis. There has been a large migration of Indians to Saudi Arabia, with the number of Hindus also witnessing a growth.

== Background ==
Historical Population
Year	Pop.	±%
2000	129,640	—
2010	301,636	+132.7%
2020	708,000	+134.7%

Saudi Arabia is an Islamic theocracy. Sunni Islam is the state religion and the public practice of any religion other than Islam is not allowed. All of the Hindus living in the nation are foreign-based expatriates and tourists on working and tourist permits.

Most Indians in the earlier waves of emigration to Saudi Arabia were Muslim, but after 2001 the share of Indian Hindus has increased, as has the number of Hindus from the Nepali diaspora. Though having an adequate population of Hindus, there is no Hindu temple or any other place of worship for non-Muslims and the freedom of religion of non-Muslims is very much limited.

== Limitations ==
Like other non-Muslim religions, Hindus are not permitted to worship publicly in Saudi Arabia. There have also been some complaints of destruction of Hindu religious items by Saudi Arabian authorities. Saudi authorities interpret Hindu icons as idols, and idol worship is strongly condemned in Islam. This is likely the foundation for the stringent position of Saudi authorities when it comes to idol worshiper religious practice.

Any conversion away from Islam is known as apostasy and it invites capital punishment. Proselytizing by non-Muslims, including the distribution of non-Muslim religious materials such as Bhagavad Gita, and Ahmadi books are illegal.

== See also ==
- Religion in Saudi Arabia
- Hinduism in Arab states
