= Nepalese in Thailand =

Nepali diaspora in Thailand

- (Nepal) (Thailand)

Total population
- 20,000

Regions with significant populations
- Bangkok · Phuket · Pattaya · Ko Samui · Pilok

Languages
- Thai · Nepali

Religion
- Hinduism

Related ethnic groups
- Nepali people, Nepalese diaspora

Nepalese in Thailand comprise migrants from Nepal to Thailand, including expatriates and permanent residents, as well as their locally born descendants. Many Nepalese settled in Pilok, near the Thai-Burma border in Kanchanaburi, after the end of World War II, that neither the Nepalese nor the Thai government knew about until recent times.

== Overview ==
Most Nepalese in Thailand mainly live in Bangkok, Chiang Mai and in the popular resort towns of Phuket, Pattaya and Chaweng Beach on Ko Samui in the Gulf of Thailand. Around 4,000 to 5,000 Nepalese work in Thailand, according to the Nepalese embassy in Bangkok. They tend to engage in specific types of work such as clerks in tailor shops, as ready-made garment makers, and as trinket sellers at the beach resorts. A few of them also run small restaurants. Not all the Nepalese in Thailand are legal residents and some have been hiding and surviving in Thailand as displaced persons on odd-jobs such as shop-boys and waiters.

The number of Nepalese receiving Thailand visas in the first eight months of 2009 has increased by 30 percent as compared to the figures of same period in the previous year.

== See also ==
- Nepalese diaspora
- Ethnic groups in Thailand
