= Bangladesh–Nepal relations =

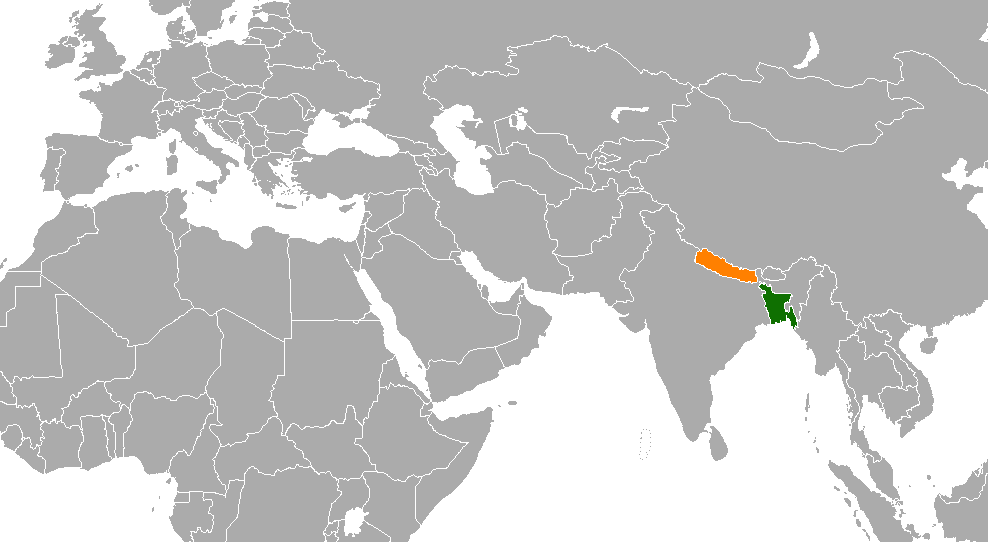

- Bangladesh: Nepal

The bilateral relations between Bangladesh and Nepal have been warm and friendly since the foundation of Bangladesh in 1971. The two nations are separated by the "Chicken Neck" (Siliguri Corridor)- a 22 kilometres (14 mi) wide stretch of territory of the Indian state of West Bengal that lies between southern Nepal and northern Bangladesh. Both South Asian nations are members of the South Asian Association for Regional Cooperation (SAARC), the Bay of Bengal Initiative for MultiSectoral Technical and Economic Cooperation (BIMSTEC), and the United Nations (UN).

Salahuddin Noman Chowdhury is the ambassador of Bangladesh to Nepal.

== History ==
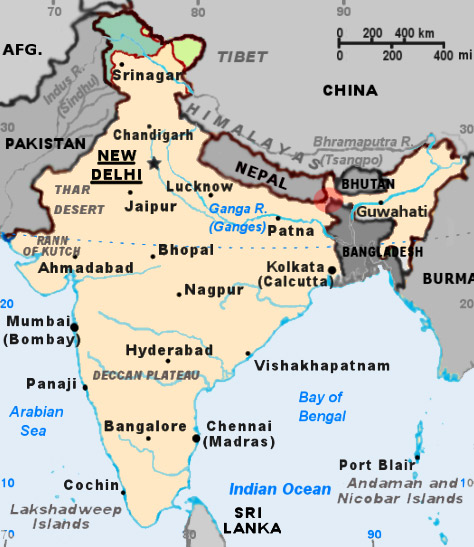
Chicken Neck of India separates Nepal from Bangladesh

Although it maintained a neutral stance on the Bangladesh Liberation War, the then-Kingdom of Nepal became one of the first nations to recognise Bangladesh, on January 16, 1972; in retaliation, Pakistan broke off relations with Nepal. With Bangladesh, Nepal saw an opportunity to obtain access to port facilities in the Bay of Bengal to bolster foreign trade - something it had sought when Bangladesh was part of Pakistan, to limited success. Bilateral relations improved considerably when the 1975 military coup in Bangladesh brought to power a government that distanced the country from India, with both nations seeking to counter the influence of their largest neighbour. In April 1976, both nations signed bilateral agreements to develop trade, transit and civil aviation. The transit agreement exempted all traffic-in-transit from duties and other charges. Six points of entry and exit for Nepalese traffic were set up. However, the Nepalese goods had to be unloaded at the border, due to the absence of an agreement allowing Nepalese trucks direct access to the ports. In 1986, Bangladesh demanded the participation of Nepal in talks with India over the distribution of water from the Ganges River.

== Bilateral trade ==
Despite progress in bilateral ties, the volume of trade between the two countries stands at less than $60 million per year. In 2008–09, Bangladesh's exports to Nepal were worth $6.7 million; its major exports include pharmaceuticals, garments, plastics, handicrafts and other goods. Nepal exported $53 million worth of goods, largely agricultural produce such as pulses, lentils, rice and wheat.

=== Transit route ===
In 1998, the Phulbari treaty between India and Bangladesh allowed Nepalese goods access to Bangladesh through a transit route in India. In 2010, a joint communique issued by the Prime Minister of India Dr. Manmohan Singh and the Bangladeshi Prime Minister Sheikh Hasina Wajed assured giving Nepal and Bhutan access to Bangladeshi ports. The commerce secretaries of both countries were scheduled to meet and finalise details for an extensive transit agreement.

== Diplomatic missions ==
Nepal has an embassy in Dhaka. It is located at 2 Number, Diplomatic Enclave, United Nations Rd, Dhaka 1212 The current Ambassador is Ghanshyam Bhandari.

== See also ==
- Foreign relations of Bangladesh
- Foreign relations of Nepal
