= Nepalese Australians =

Nepali diaspora in Australia

नेपाली अष्ट्रेलियन (Nepali) नेपाली अष्ट्रेलियाली ५ (Maithili)
- (Nepal) (Australia)

Total population
- 138,463 (2021, by ancestry); 213,580 (2025, by birth)

Regions with significant populations
- Sydney · Melbourne · Brisbane

Languages
- English · Nepali · Maithili

Religion
- Majority Hinduism · Buddhism · Kirant Mundhum · minorities. Islam

Related ethnic groups
- Non Resident Nepali

Nepali or Nepalese Australians (Nepali: नेपाली अष्ट्रेलियन) are Australians whose ethnic origins lie fully or partially in any part of Nepal. People from Nepal started to settle in Australia from the 1960s, but the vast majority of Nepali Australians arrived after 2006.

Australian residents of Nepali origin have significantly increased in recent years: in the 2021 census, 138,463 people reported Nepali ancestry, 0.54% of the total population. Just five years before, in the 2016 census, there were only 62,806 people with Nepali ancestry. This follows after the population of this community quadrupled in the five years to 2011, and doubled again in the five years in 2016.

== Lhotshampa refugees ==
About 5,000 Lhotshampas or Bhutanese refugees who are living in various refugee camps of Nepal are being resettled in Australia. They share a common language and culture with the mainstream Nepali.

Since 1990, more than 110,000 ethnic Nepalis who were forced out of Bhutan have temporarily settled in refugee camps in eastern Nepal. After the 15 years of exile they are now being resettled in Australia, US and Europe. By the end of the resettlement program it was estimated that around 5,000 Bhutanese would be in Australia.

== International students ==
The number of Nepali students seeking admission to universities in Australia is increasing. The instability caused by the Maoist insurgency and Gorkha earthquake of 2015, has led Nepali students to turn to Australia for academic pursuits. The figures from the federal Government’s Australian Education International (AEI) in 2007 show that in the 12 months to September, commencements by students from Nepal increased by 504 per cent, or 2884 students.

== Notable individuals ==
- Shesh Ghale, businessman and former president of the Non Resident Nepali Association
- Jamuna Gurung, entrepreneur and co-founder of the Melbourne Institute of Technology
- Dichen Lachman, actress known for her roles in Severance and Dollhouse
- Payal Shakya, former Miss Nepal and environmental activist
- Sanu Sharma, novelist and short story writer
- Sarun Tamrakar, lead singer of the pop band The Uglyz
- Esha Tewari, singer

== See also ==
- List of Nepal-related topics
- Non Resident Nepali
- Nepali New Zealanders
- Australia–Nepal relations
- Darwin Hearts FC
