= Nepalis in Pakistan =

People of Nepali origin settled in Pakistan

Nepalese in Pakistan
- (Nepal) (Pakistan)
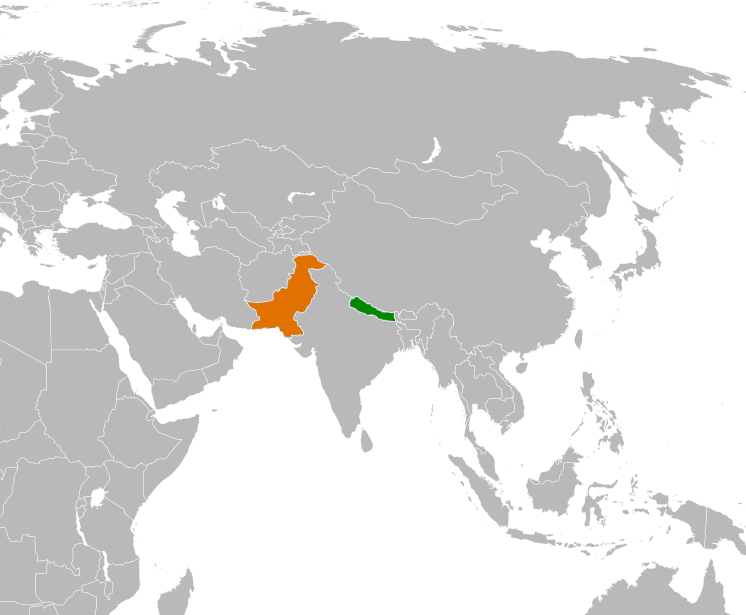

Total population
- 1,000

Regions with significant populations
- Lahore and Islamabad.

Languages
- Urdu · Punjabi · Nepali

Religion
- Hinduism, minority Islam.

Related ethnic groups
- Nepali people

There is a small community of Nepalis in Pakistan (Urdu: پاکستانی نیپالی) who are mostly the citizens of Nepal and descendants of Gurkhas who served in the Sikh Khalsa Army as well as recent migrants from Nepal.

== Migration history ==
After the Anglo–Nepalese War, some dissident Nepalese commanders and 200 troops joined the Punjab army and were warmly welcomed by Maharaja Ranjit Singh. Parts of the Nepali Army which had fought valiantly against Punjab were integrated into the Punjabi armed forces. These Punjabi troops of Nepali origin were stationed in Lahore. Their countrymen back in Nepal started calling them "Lahure", since they were working in Lahore. This is how the term Lahure originated.

Nepalese doctors and medical students have been coming to Pakistan in recent years for work and further education. Approximately, 70 Nepali students, including 40 doctors, are pursuing higher education in Punjab province alone. All together, more than 200 Nepalis are pursuing medical courses in Pakistan.

== See also ==
- Pakistanis in Nepal
- Nepal–Pakistan relations
