= Nepalis in Malaysia =

People of Nepali origin settled in Malaysia

Total population
- 700,000 (2016)

Regions with significant populations
- Malaysia; Throughout Peninsular Malaysia, mainly concentrated in Kuala Lumpur, Johor and Penang.

Languages
- English · Malay · Maithili · Nepali

Religion
- Hinduism, Buddhism, and Kiratism

There is a large community of Nepalis in Malaysia, recruited from Nepal, foreign workers and their families. In 2020, there were over 382,000 documented Nepali workers in Malaysia – the majority of which were working in the manufacturing sector.

== Overview ==
After the Federation of Malaya became independent from the United Kingdom in August 1957, many Gurkhas became soldiers in the Malayan armed forces, especially in the Royal Ranger Regiment. Others became security guards, mainly in the urban areas. The number of Nepali workers going to Malaysia has increased in the recent years due to the recovery from global recession and the removal of levy. Nepali foreign employment agencies think that Malaysia might revise its decision to absorb labour from Nepal. As far as Malaysia is concerned, Nepal is the second largest labour supplying country after Indonesia. Most Nepalis work in small restaurants, hotels, factories and industries. Recently, the Malaysian government has decided to stop hiring Nepali workers, reasoning that they want to give priority to their own increasing number of unemployed countrymen.

In Malaysia, Nepali workers have formed 73 organisations related to political parties. Malaysia is also famous among the returnees as well because 30 percent working currently in Malaysia have re-visited there for work and 20 percent are those have gone to the country after coming back from Gulf countries. It is estimated that there are about 0.2 million foreign illegal workers in Malaysia with about 50,000 from Nepal alone. In March 2010, Malaysian authorities have arrested over 500 Nepalis working and staying illegally along with illegal workers from other countries from various factories and industries they were working.

== Issues ==
Due to the weaker policies of both the Government (ie. Nepal Government & Malaysian Government), Many Nepali workers in Malaysia have been suffering different problems including human rights. Both the government has become weaker in providing the Nepali workers the basic requirement or consideration that should be given to any foreign workers. The plight of Nepali workers abroad is not new and many recruiters and employers in Malaysia continue to get away with exploitation because the workers have nowhere to turn. However, it seems the Malaysian government is more concerned about the welfare of Nepali workers than the Nepali government. But due to the lack of regular inspection and very poor strategical operation of Malaysian Government as of recruitment procedure of Nepali workers from Nepal, the Nepali workers are also suffering more in the name of GSG (ISC- Immigration Security Clearance) and FWCMS Medical system and even in the name of Visa Stamping.

Another concern is that the deaths of Nepali workers in Malaysia have significantly increased with at least 81 aspirants having died within the first six months of 2010. According to the Nepali embassy at Kuala Lumpur, road accidents, chronic disease, workplace and even suicide cases has been identified as the cause for deaths.

== See also ==
- Malaysia–Nepal relations
- Nepalis in Singapore
- Hinduism in Malaysia
- Buddhism in Malaysia
