= Nepalese people in the Philippines =

People of Nepali origin settled in Philippines

Total population
- 2,745 (2000 Philippines census)

Regions with significant populations
- Cebu City · Quezon City · Naga City

Languages
- Nepali · English · Filipino · Cebuano

Religion
- Hinduism · Buddhism

Related ethnic groups
- Nepali people

Nepalese people in the Philippines form a small migrant and immigrant community consisting mostly of doctors and medical students with Nepalese origin.

== Overview ==
Hospitals in the Philippines have been opening up its residency program to doctors from Nepal to address a shortage of Filipino physicians. Doctors from Nepal have been migrating to the Philippines for residency training in government hospitals.

Bicol Medical Center (BMC) based in Naga City has about a total of 40 Nepalese doctors who are undergoing or are about to undergo residency training. They are assigned to different departments like pediatrics, obstetrics, surgery and internal medicine and will train under the hospital's specialists and consultants in these fields. Other hospitals that also accepted the Nepalese doctors for residency training include the East Avenue Medical Center (EAMC), based in suburban Quezon City, Metro Manila and the Vicente Sotto Memorial Medical Center (VSMMC) in Cebu City.

In Corazon Locsin Montelibano Memorial Regional Hospital (CLMMRH), based in Bacolod city, Negros, there were Nepalese residents undergoing residency training in different departments. CLMMRH is only the tertiary center and trauma center in Negros island. It has residency training program in 11 different departments and accredited by their respective societies.

== See also ==
- Indians in the Philippines
- Non Resident Nepali
