= Nepalis in Germany =

Nepali diaspora in Germany

Nepalese in Germany
जर्मनीमा रहेका नेपाली (Nepali) Nepalesen in Deutschland (German)
- Distribution of Nepali citizens in Germany (2021)

Total population
- 11,000

Regions with significant populations
- Munich · Berlin · Hamburg · Göttingen

Languages
- German · Nepali

Religion
- Hinduism · Buddhism

Related ethnic groups
- Non Resident Nepali

Nepalis in Germany consists of immigrants, refugees and expatriates from Nepal as well as German people of Nepalese descent. Most of them live in large cities like Munich, Frankfurt, Hamburg and Berlin. However they are spread all over Germany. Nepalese living in Germany have basically three different backgrounds: (a) Those who came as au-pair and student, (b) Those who arrived German on the basis of family reunion and (c) those who have been arrived as refugees.

== Migration history ==
Hundreds of Nepalis emigrated from Nepal to Germany to seek political asylum, fleeing persecution either from the Maoists or police. A small number of Nepalese entrepreneurs and international students have also migrated to Germany for business and further education.

== Distribution ==
=== Munich ===
There are around 200 Nepalis living in and around Munich and there is also a small but thriving community of students studying medicine, language and other subjects.

Munich is also home to a Nepalese temple garden known as the Pagoda Nepal. The center of the garden is a hand carved pagoda. As in Nepal, the nine-meter-high pagoda stands on a plateau. The temple figures that flanked the staircase are issued just as the temple bell in the pagoda.

=== Elsewhere ===
Other cities with significant Nepalese populations include Berlin, Hamburg and Göttingen.

== Organizations ==
Nepali Samaj, Germany is a Nepalese community organization in Germany. The organization was established in April 2003 by the group of young Nepalese in Germany along with the friends of Nepal in Germany.

Other organizations include the NRN-NCC-Germany and SONOG (Students of Nepalese Origin in Germany).

== Notable people ==
- Zascha Moktan – Nepalese-German singer, pianist and guitarist
- Ram Pratap Thapa – Honorary Consul General to Germany at Cologne and chairman of German-Nepalese society

== See also ==
- Germany–Nepal relations
- Nepalis in Austria
- Hinduism in Germany
- Buddhism in Germany
