= The Uglyz =

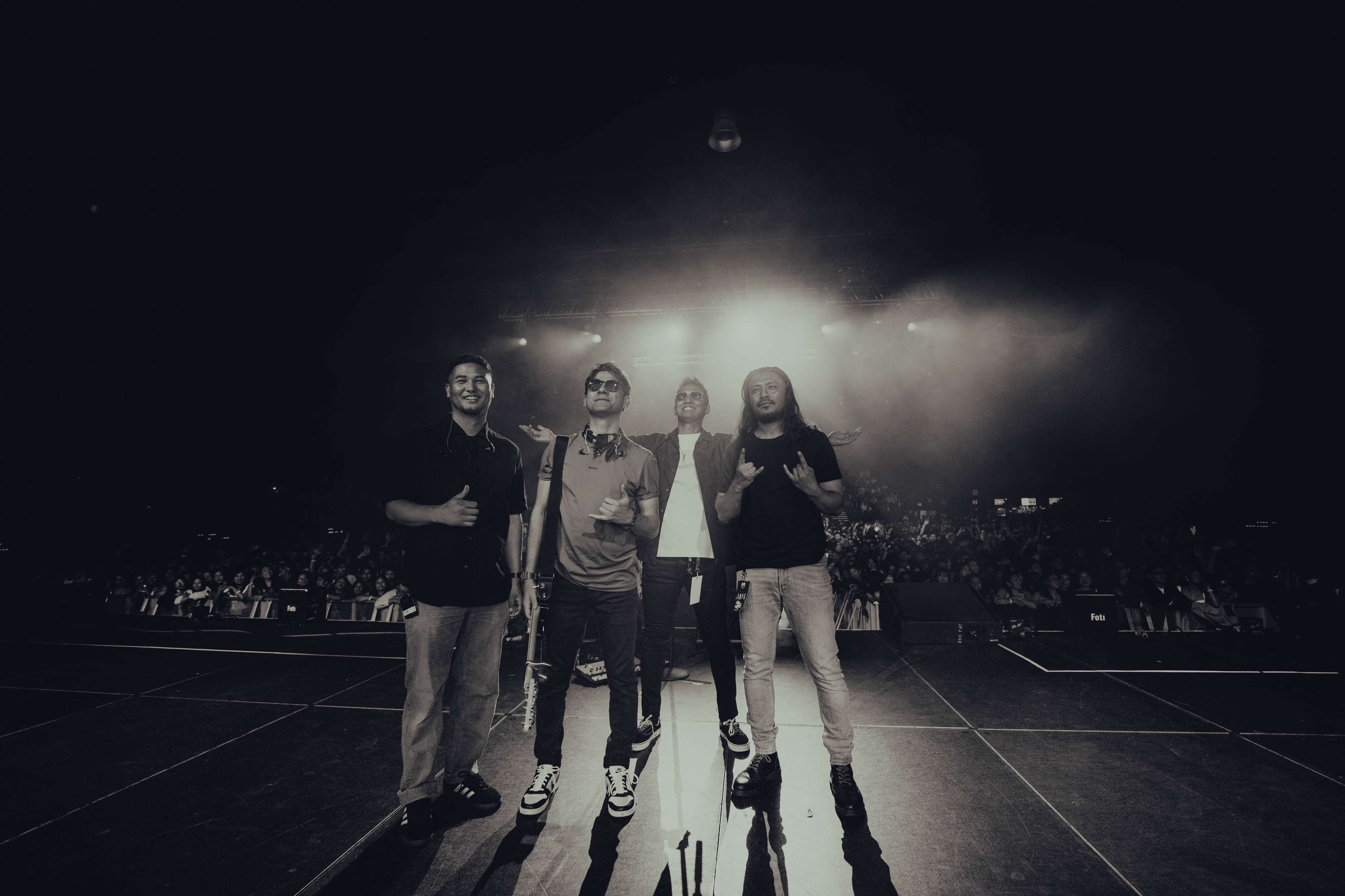
The Uglyz They Uglyz after the performance in LG Nite 2024 Left to right: Sonam Lama, Sarun Tamrakar, Anuj Shrestha, and Nishan Shrestha
- Origin: Kathmandu, Nepal
- Genre: Pop rock
- Years active: 1995–2018, 2024-Present
- Members: Sarun Tamrakar (Vocals, Guitar); Sonam Lama (Guitar, Vocals); Anuj Shrestha (Drums, Vocals, Samples); Nishan Shrestha (Bass); Rakshak Bhushan Bajracharya (Guitar)
- Past members: Sudip Tamrakar (Guitar); Rakin Lal Shrestha (Drums); Sachen Bajracharya (Keys); Nirajan Rai; Dipesh Nyachyon; Sandesh Tuladhar

The Uglyz is a Nepali pop rock band, formed in 1995 in Kathmandu.

== History ==
The Uglyz, initially formed in 1995 by Sarun Tamrakar (vocalist), Sudip Tamrakar (guitarist), and Rakin Lal Shrestha (drummer) while they were students at Little Angel's School in Hattiban, Nepal, went on a brief hiatus as the members pursued higher education abroad. Sarun relocated to Australia, Sudip continued his studies in Nepal, and Rakin moved to India. After completing their studies, the band reunited in 2003 in Nepal with the support of their families and friends.

In 2005, The Uglyz released their debut album, Rush, on January 31, which resonated with both teenagers and adults across Nepal. The band's follow-up album, In Transit, was released in 2011, further cementing their place in the music scene. Following this, the band embarked on global tours, performing in various locations such as Hong Kong in 2013, Nepal in 2014, and Australia and the UK in 2016.

In 2018, The Uglyz released a collaborative duet "Jau na aau" with Nepal Idol season 1 finalist Kengal Mehar Shrestha. After this release, the band entered a hiatus.

In 2024, The Uglyz exited their hiatus with a new lineup. They are currently working on new music. Their return to performance took place at Dreamfest in Sydney, an annual event organized by Dream Heights, marking a new chapter in the band's journey.

The first hit song Aaudai Jadai (Timro Nyano) was a theme translation from Japanese.

== Current Band members ==
- Sarun Tamrakar
- Sonam Lama
- Anuj Shrestha
- Nishan Shrestha
- Rakshak Bhushan Bajracharya

== Previous Band members ==
- Sudip Tamrakar
- Rakin Lal Shrestha
- Sachen Bajracharya
- Nirajan Rai
- Dipesh Nyachyon
- Sandesh Tuladhar

== Albums ==
- Rush (2005)

No.	Title	Length
1.	"Aaudai Jaadai"	4:15
2.	"Maya"	3:46
3.	"Parkhai"	4:22
4.	"Saathi"	4:16
5.	"Rojdai Chu (bonus track)"	5:04
6.	"To an Angle"	4:47
7.	"Ugly"	4:16
8.	"Khonnanimo (Japanese Song)"	4:12

- In Transit (2011)

No.	Title	Length
1.	"Ajhai"	3:53
2.	"Aakash"	4:41
3.	"Dherai Aasu Thorai Haaso"	4:06
4.	"Aash"	3:00
5.	"K"	3:41
6.	"Sadhai Bhari"	3:44
7.	"Khate"	3:08
8.	"Try"	3:52
9.	"Khate II"	3:06
