= Nepalis in Libya =

Total population
- 3,064

Regions with significant populations
- Tripoli · Misrata · Derna · Benghazi

Languages
- Nepali · Arabic

Religion
- Hinduism · Buddhism

Related ethnic groups
- Nepali people

Nepalis in Libya are mainly migrant workers from Nepal. According to Nepal's Ministry of Foreign Affairs, in February 2011 there were 3,064 Nepalis working in Libya.

== Overview ==
The majority of Nepalese workers in Libya work as construction or industrial laborers. The Nepalese government has opened Libya for foreign employment in 2009 and about six Nepalese outsourcing agencies have sent 1,868 Nepalis to Libya while 22 have reached there through individual contracts. Department of Foreign Employment data showed that 2,592 Nepalis reached the country in the two years to 2011.

Following the 2011 Libyan civil war, many Nepalese workers began to leave the country. About 1,200 Nepalis had already left Libya according to the Nepal Foreign Employment Association. Many of them left the country through Egypt by reaching the border from Derna under a rescue effort coordinated by Nepal's envoy in Cairo.

== See also ==
- Nepalis in Saudi Arabia
- Hinduism in Libya
- Buddhism in Libya
