= Migration in Nepal =

Nepal is a country where the industrial growth is limited, making land the most economic asset. However, obtaining land in Nepal is far from easy. During the period of colonization, land in Nepal was more abundant and people could obtain large amounts of land. As time passed, the frontier land became occupied, which placed a higher price on scarce land.

In recent years, there has been a steady pattern of migration in Nepal from the hill and mountain regions to the Terai. The Terai is a fertile agricultural area along the southern border of Nepal. The 1981 Nepalese census indicated a pronounced shift from a mountain-rural to a plains-urban society (Goldstein; Ross; Schuler). Authors Hrabvoszky and Miyan call this change “The Great Turnabout”.

The population in the mountain regions of Nepal has exceeded the carrying capacity of the land. Therefore, people are moving to the more arable lands of the Terai. It is estimated that 60% of Nepal’s population is concentrated in the hill and mountain regions, while 60% of farmland is in the Terai. The migrants hope to make a better life for themselves by moving to the agricultural hub of the country. However, these migrants are having difficulty finding affordable land.

“The Great Turnabout” is causing a great deal of tension in the Terai. The region is experiencing ethnic tension between the plains and hill people. Furthermore, deforestation in the Terai is drastically reducing the country’s timber resources, and is also increasing soil erosion and flooding (Weiner). Finally, political leaders in Nepal feel the hill and mountain regions represent the cultural heartland of the country and they do not want to see these areas abandoned for the Terai.

== Internal Migration ==
Historically, migration in Nepal followed a broad movement from the hill and mountain regions toward the fertile plains of the Tarai. This movement accelerated after the expansion of roads, malaria eradication in the Tarai during the 1950s and 1960s, and government resettlement programs. Rural-to-urban migration has become the dominant trend as agriculture has provided fewer economic opportunities and access to education, healthcare, and services has become concentrated in urban areas.

Nepal has maintained relatively detailed migration data through national censuses since 1961. By the 2011 census, internal migration had increased substantially, with many Nepalese moving either permanently or temporarily in search of employment, education, security, and improved living conditions. Migration patterns are strongly age-selective, peaking in early adulthood. Men have tended to migrate mainly for work and study, while women have more commonly migrated for marriage and family-related reasons.

== International Migration ==
International migration from Nepal is primarily a labour migration phenomenon shaped by a combination of domestic economic conditions and demand for migrant workers in foreign labour markets. Remittances play a significant role in supporting household consumption and investment in education and assets, while also contributing substantially to Nepal’s broader economy. At the same time, migration outcomes vary across households, with unequal access to migration opportunities and exposure to risks faced by migrant workers abroad.

Push side
International migration is associated with limited domestic employment opportunities, underemployment in agriculture, and relatively low wage levels in the Nepali labour market. These conditions contribute to migration being used by many households as a strategy for income diversification and risk management.

Pull side
Migration is driven by strong demand for low- and semi-skilled labour in destination countries, particularly in the Gulf Cooperation Council states and Malaysia. These destinations typically offer substantially higher wages than those available in Nepal, especially in sectors such as construction, manufacturing, and domestic work, which employ large numbers of Nepali migrant workers.
