= Nepal–Pakistan relations =

- Pakistan: Nepal

Nepal–Pakistan relations refer to the bilateral relations between Nepal and Pakistan, both Himalayan states located in the Indian subcontinent. After the Partition of British India in August 1947, Nepal moved to establish diplomatic relations with the Dominion of India, but did not do so with the Dominion of Pakistan. Official diplomatic ties did not exist between the two states until initial steps were taken on 29 March 1960; these relations were then fully established in 1962 and 1963. Both nations have since sought to expand their bilateral trade, strategic and military cooperation. In 1972, following Pakistan's defeat in the Bangladesh Liberation War and the secession of East Pakistan as the People's Republic of Bangladesh, Nepal recognized the latter's independence. Pakistan severed ties with Nepal shortly afterwards, but these were later re-established.

== History ==
Nepal established diplomatic relations with India after the latter's independence in 1947, but did not do so with Pakistan. In 1950, Nepal signed a Treaty of Peace and Friendship with India, creating an extensive relationship of economic, strategic and defence cooperation. Nepal thus remained aloof from Pakistan, which was at conflict with India. However, Nepal's resentment of Indian influence perceived to be excessive prompted the Nepalese government to develop relations with the People's Republic of China and Pakistan. Diplomatic relations between Nepal and Pakistan were established on 20 March 1960. After the establishment of diplomatic relations, the bonds of friendship and cordiality between these two countries, propelled by understanding and cooperation, have strengthened. The state of bilateral relations at present is based on goodwill, mutual cooperation and friendship. Nepal established a residential Nepalese embassy in Pakistan in 1962 and honorary Nepalese consulate general in Karachi in 1975.

== Diplomatic relations ==
Nepal and Pakistan signed a protocol for establishing diplomatic relations in 1962. They exchanged ambassadors and set up embassies in 1963, when Ayub Khan, the President of Pakistan made a special visit to Nepal. Both nations also signed agreements to reciprocate the "Most Favored Nation" status of importance for developing trade and cooperation. In 1963, Pakistan agreed to provide Nepal with free trade access and transport facilities through the port of Chittagong in East Pakistan (now Bangladesh) and established an air link. This arrangement reduced Nepal's dependence on India for trading privileges. Although Nepal officially maintained neutrality during the Indo-Pakistani War of 1971, it was one of the first to recognise the independence of Bangladesh. As a retaliation, Islamabad severed ties with Kathmandu two days later.

=== Pakistan's support for the democratic process in Nepal ===
Politically, Nepal and Pakistan have remained good friends over the decades. Pakistan has extended its support for the democratic process in Nepal, after the successful People's Movement-II. Pakistan welcomed the restoration of Nepal's parliament following the popular movement and hoped that the breakthrough would usher in an era of durable peace and prosperity in Nepal. Pakistan has been reiterating its support for Nepal's sovereignty, territorial integrity and peaceful development.

=== SAARC Summit ===
The 19th SAARC summit was a scheduled diplomatic conference, which was originally planned to be held in Islamabad, Pakistan on 15–16 November 2016. Following the rising diplomatic tensions after the Uri terrorist attack, India announced its boycott of the summit, alleging Pakistan's involvement in the attack.

Nepal, the current chair of SAARC, urged that "a conducive environment be created soon to ensure the participation of all member states in the 19th SAARC summit in line with the spirit of the SAARC charter".

Whilst Prime Minister of Nepal Sher Bahadur Deuba underscored his country's commitment to make SAARC a constructive forum for the region and to support Pakistan for the holding of the next SAARC Summit in Islamabad.

== Economic relations ==
Nepal and Pakistan signed a trade agreement on 19 October 1962, in order to boost up the bilateral trade. Despite another extensive 1982 trade agreement, the volume of bilateral trade remains comparatively small at US$4.8 million. Pakistan's total exports to Nepal are worth US$1.631 million, while Nepal's exports to Pakistan tally $3.166 million. Both countries have recently stepped up efforts to promote bilateral trade, especially in textiles, oilseeds, extraction of oil and tourism; Pakistan also offered a US$5 million line of credit to Nepal. Nepal and Pakistan are signatories to the South Asia Free Trade Agreement (SAFTA) and members of the South Asian Economic Union.

=== FNCCI-FPCCI Joint Business Council ===
The Federation of Nepalese Chambers of Commerce and Industry and the Federation of Pakistan Chambers of Commerce & Industry have established FNCCI-FPCCI Joint Business Council. Its meetings provides opportunities for the business communities of the two countries to meet and discuss business opportunities in each other's countries.

== Education ==
Pakistan, under the Pakistan Technical Assistance Programme (PTAP), provides annually scholarships to Nepal in Medicine, Pharmacy and Engineering. There are 500 Nepali students undertaking higher studies in the field of medical science, engineering, pharmacy, information technology, social science, management, and mass communication in Pakistan. Pakistan provides long and short term training's to the government officials of Nepal.

=== Pakistani Technical Assistance Programme ===
Pakistan has been providing 15 scholarships annually to Nepalese students under Pakistan Technical Assistance Programme in medicine, dentistry, pharmacy and engineering. Besides, some Nepalese students have been studying in the areas of humanities and business administration on self-finance basis. Pakistan has also provided short-term and long-term trainings to Nepal Army officers.

== Rescue and relief work ==
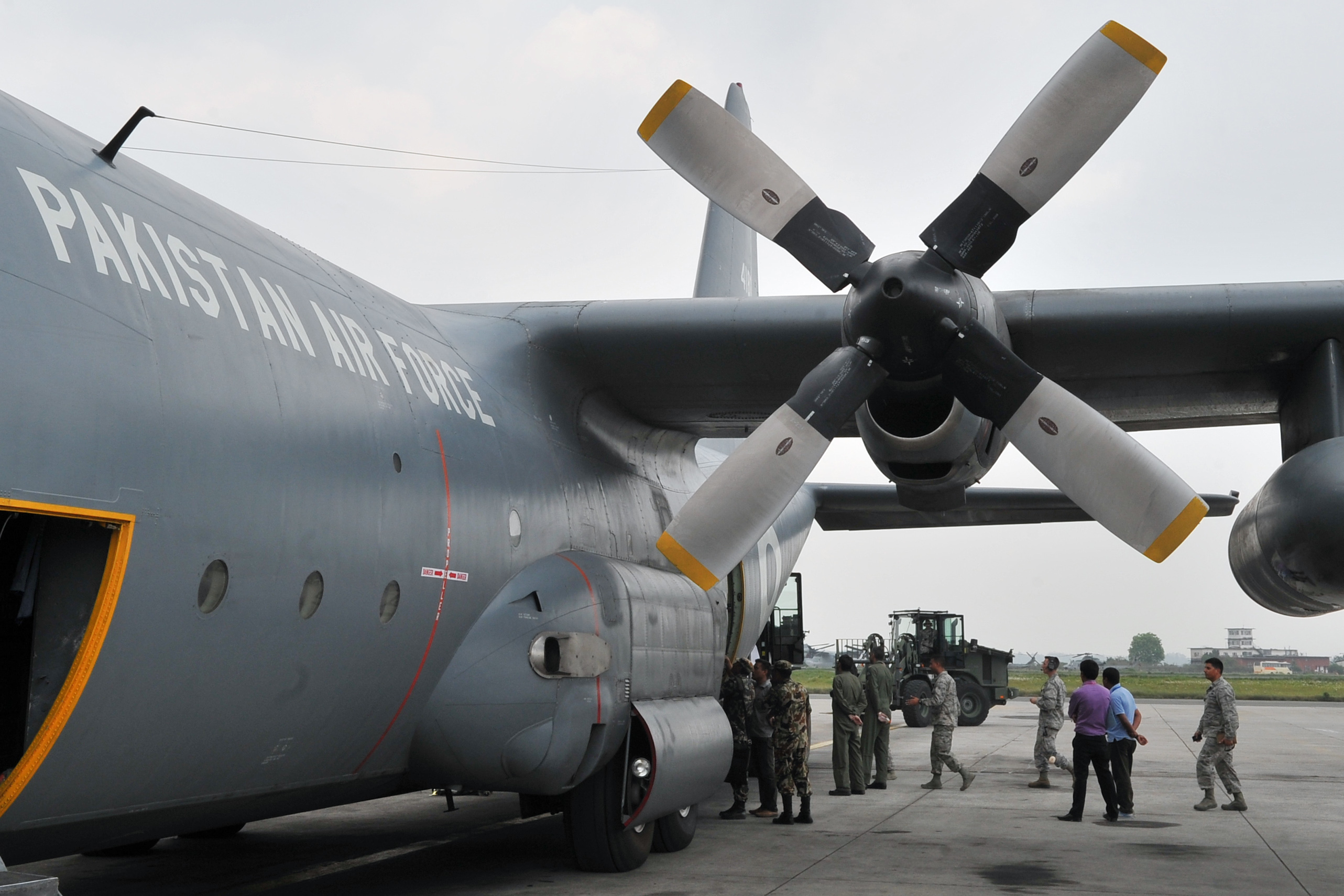
Nepalese Army, Pakistan Air Force, United States Air Force work together to download relief supplies in Nepal.

After the devastating earthquake of April 2015, the Government of Pakistan sent immediate assistance to Nepal. It dispatched rescue and relief teams, food, water, tents and other relief material. Pakistan took part in the International Conference on Nepal's Reconstruction and pledged support to Nepal.

The Government of Pakistan provided US$1 million to the Government of Nepal as the relief to the victims of flood and landslides in Terai region of Nepal in 2017.

== Security relations ==
In recent years, both countries began developing military cooperation, with Nepal importing arms from Pakistan. Condemned and isolated from India, Great Britain and the United States between 2004 and 2006 for repressing democracy, the Nepalese monarchy developed military cooperation with China and Pakistan, who offered extensive military support, arms and military equipment to Nepal for the monarchy to stay in power and fight the Maoist insurgency. Both Pakistan and China have provided medium-tech weapons to Nepal.

== Culture ==
Nepal and Pakistan signed the Cultural Agreement in May 1970 which aims at promoting cultural relations, establishing inter-universities relations, and cooperation between Radio and Television. Nepal-Pakistan Friendship and Cultural Association is in operation in Kathmandu. A Nepal Friendship Group also exists in Islamabad.

== Tourism ==
Nepal and Pakistan signed the Agreement on Tourism Cooperation in February 2009. The Agreement provides for mutual cooperation in tourism and archaeology; exchanges of tourism organizations and travel and tour operators; cooperation to encourage tourists from third countries to visit their respective countries; mutual exchange of tourism information, materials and experience; production of tourism-related films and video-tapes; and joint collaboration for investment.

Every year, about 5,000 tourists from Pakistan visit Nepal.

== See also ==
- Nepalis in Pakistan
- Pakistanis in Nepal
