= Nepalis in Italy =

Nepali diaspora in Italy

Nepalese in Italy
Total population
- 2,500

Regions with significant populations
- Milan · Rome · Venice · Pisa · Bologna

Languages
- Italian · Nepali

Religion
- Hinduism · Buddhism

Related ethnic groups
- Non Resident Nepali

There is a small community of Nepalis in Italy consisting mainly of immigrants and expatriates from Nepal.

== Overview ==
It is currently estimated that there are as many as 2,500 Nepalis currently living in Italy and their number is increasing. There has been increase in the number of Nepalese arriving in Italy with different motives and objectives during the last few years. There are also many Nepalis coming to Italy from other European countries. Most Nepalis in Italy work in private sector factories and restaurants but some of them have also started their own business like small shops and Nepalese restaurants. There are also a few involved in academic works like research and teaching.

=== Organizations ===
The NRNA-NCC of Italy was officially launched in a meeting of a large number of Nepalis organized in Milan on March 23, 2008. The participants of the meeting include delegates representing Nepalis residing in various regions of Italy as well as a number of different Nepali associations in the country.

Among the participants represented were: "Nepali Association of Italy (NAI)" in Venice, "Nepali Samaj" in Pisa (NSP), "Nepali Association of Rome in Italy" in Rome (NARI), "Nepal Miteri Munch" in Milan (NMM) and the Nepalese communities of Bologna, Mantua, Varese, Brescia and Crema.

== See also ==
- Hinduism in Italy
- Buddhism in Italy
