= Nepalis in Kuwait =

People of Nepali origin settled in Kuwait

Total population
- 67,226 (31 December 2020)

Regions with significant populations
- Kuwait City and Farwaniyah

Languages
- Nepali · Eastern Arabic

Religion
- Hinduism · Buddhism

Related ethnic groups
- Nepali people

Nepalis in Kuwait consist mainly of migrants from Nepal to Kuwait, mostly migrant workers and domestic maids. A growing number of Nepalese workers are joining the hundreds of thousands of other South Asian expatriates in the oil-rich Gulf state as they are promised high monthly wages by recruiters in Nepal. More than 67,000 Nepalis working in Kuwait are domestic helpers and most of them are working as house maids.

== Social Issues ==
Dozens of Nepalese men are being cheated out of their wages by employers in Kuwait, despite laws designed to protect them. Many of them can barely survive on what they are paid once they get to Kuwait.

For Nepalese women, working in Kuwait can be even more hazardous than for the men. Due to past cases of abuse, the Nepalese government forbids them from working there as housemaids. While many succeed in earning the high salaries of their dreams, many more fall victim to physical and sexual abuse. Many of these women show up at the Nepalese embassy in Kuwait bearing clear signs of sexual assault, claiming that their former employers owe them payment, and describing inhumane and illegal working conditions. However, despite the frequency of these claims, families are rarely investigated by the authorities. More often than not, the women are simply sent back to Nepal, where the cycle of trafficking can begin again.

== See also ==
- Hinduism in Kuwait
- Buddhism in Kuwait
