= Nepalis in Poland =

Nepali diaspora in Poland

Total population
- 4,400 (2018)

Regions with significant populations
- Warsaw · Mazovia · Pomerania

Languages
- Polish · English · Nepali

Religion
- Hinduism · Buddhism

Related ethnic groups
- Non Resident Nepali

Nepalis in Poland are migrants from Nepal to Poland, mainly expatriate workers and international students.

== Migration History ==
The first Nepali to settle in Poland arrived in 1965. Immigration from Nepal grew in the 1990s' as Nepalis came for jobs as chefs in Indian Restaurants and as workers in Indian textile companies. Some of them came with families. Nepalis have been arriving in the country for further studies as well, mostly in the medical field. In 2007, there were about 40 Nepalese students studying in Poland, many of them coming with hope to get entry to other countries in Europe and work there.

Today, Nepalis, along with other Asian groups, usually work in industry, building, services and finance sectors. Most find employment in the central region of Mazovia, the northern region of Pomerania and southern region of Lesser Poland. The rise in foreign investment, especially in the finance sector, IT outsourcing and building industry have brought skilled, but cheap, labor to Poland. About 121 workers from Nepal had managed to get jobs in Poland through individual channel in 2008 and 2009, in 2015 and 2016 more than 3500 Nepalese had gone Poland through individual and through recruitment agencies according to the Department of Foreign Employment (DoFE).

In 2016, a Nepali student, Tek Prasad Adhikari doing PhD in Astronomy at the Nicolaus Copernicus Astronomical Center of the Polish Academy of Sciences was awarded the Young Scientist prize. After this, there has been an increased inflow of the Nepalese students in Poland.

== See also ==
- Hinduism in Poland
- Buddhism in Poland
