= Nepalis in Portugal =

Nepali diaspora in Portugal

Nepalese in Portugal
Total population
- 29,972

Regions with significant populations
- Lisbon · Algarve

Languages
- Portuguese · Nepali

Religion
- Hinduism · Buddhism

Related ethnic groups
- Non Resident Nepali

There is a community of Nepalis living and working in Portugal. They are one of the fastest growing expatriates and immigrants in Portugal. Most of them reside in Lisbon. As of 2019, 1,287 Nepalis acquired the Portuguese citizenship, making them the ninth biggest nationality in Portugal.

== Media ==
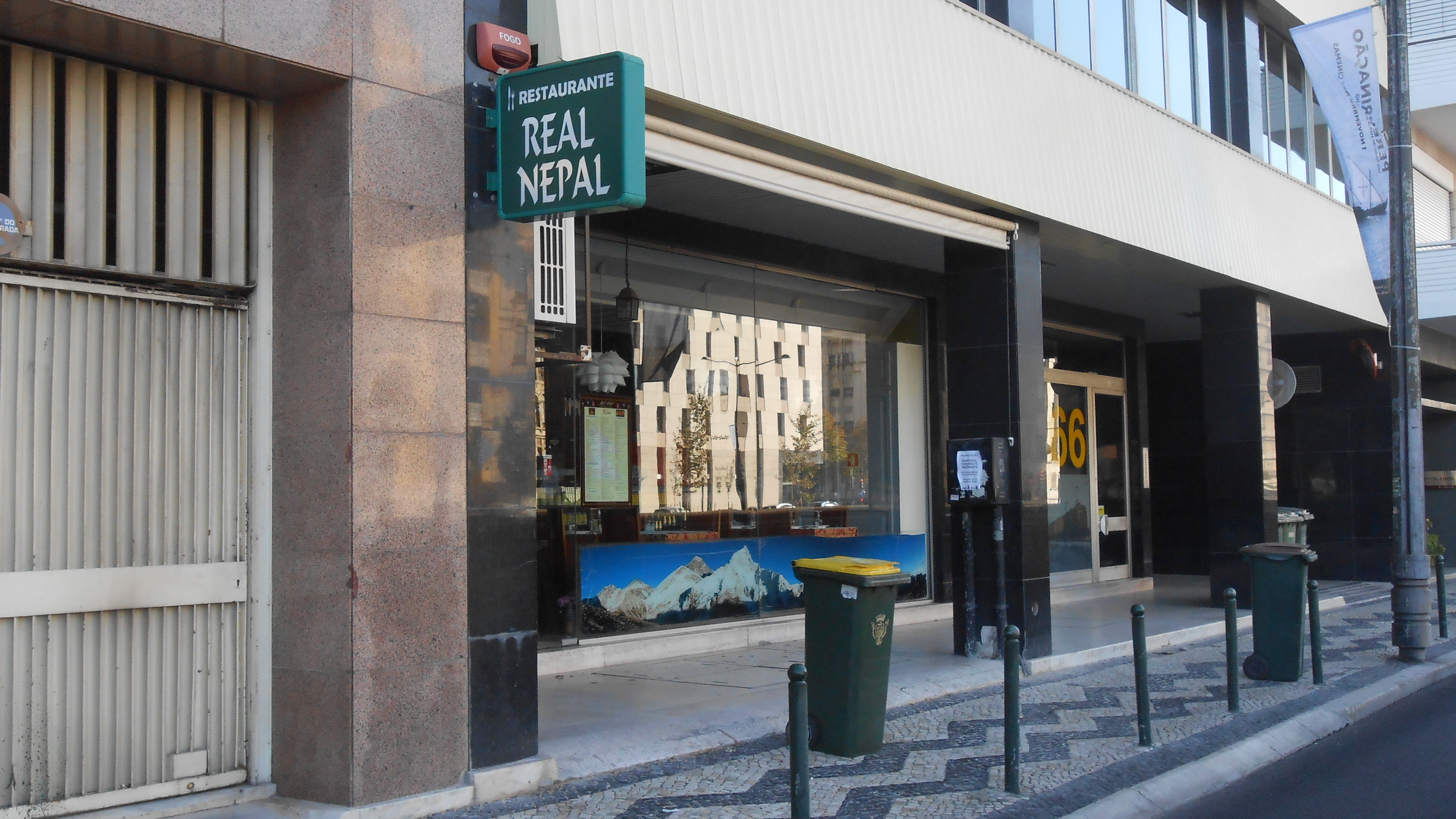
Restaurante Real Nepal, a Nepalese restaurant in Lisbon

Nepali Wave is a Nepali language newspaper that was first published in Lisbon in October 2012 and it was released by the Honorary Consular of Nepal for Portugal, Makar Bahadur Hamal and Chairman of the Nepal-Portugal Art, Literature and Communication Council, Kumar Shrestha on the occasion of the Dashain and Tihar.

== Organizations ==
Non-Resident Nepalese (NRN) Portugal is a Nepalese community organization, founded by the Nepalese community in Portugal.

In April 2012, Nepalis residing in Portugal have started the construction of Nepal House in Lisbon. President of NRN Portugal, Ramesh Kumar Gurung said that the decision was taken by the committee so as to assist in preserving Nepalese traditions and culture.

== See also ==
- Nepalese diaspora
- Immigration to Portugal
