= Kazara =

Descendants of Nepali-Tibetan marriage

Kazara are the descendants of mixed Nepali-Tibetan marriage. They are Nepali citizens but have the right to live in Lhasa. Kazara meaning 'mixed race' in Tibetan is apparently derived from the Nepali word 'khacchar' for 'mule'. Some Kazaras own the most popular tourist hotels in Lhasa today. In 2003, there were 338 official Nepali residents in Tibet. Their children attend either local Chinese schools or Gorkha Primary School funded by the Government of Nepal. Kazara today often speak Newari, Nepali, Tibetan, and Chinese.
