= Nepalese in Singapore =

Migrants from Nepal to Singapore

Languages
- English · Nepali

Religion
- Buddhism · Kirat Mundhum, Shamanism · Hinduism

Related ethnic groups
- Nepali people

Nepalis in Singapore comprise migrants from Nepal to Singapore, including temporary expatriates and permanent residents, as well as their locally born descendants.

== History ==
The first wave of Nepalese immigration was during the formation of the Gurkha Contingent (GC) of the Singapore Police Force on 9 April 1949. Selected ex-British Army Gurkhas were recruited to form the unit to replace a Sikh unit that had existed prior to the Japanese occupation during the Second World War. The GC and their families were housed at Mount Vernon Camp, located at Mount Vernon. it has undergone expansion on the hilly terrain, particularly with the introduction of modern, high quality high-rise housing blocks for the over 2,000 officers and their families-in-tow.

== Organisations ==
The Non-Resident Nepali Association of Singapore is one organisation for Nepalese people living in Singapore.

== Notable individuals ==
- Laken Limbu, footballer
