= Nepalis in China =

Nepali diaspora in China

尼泊爾人在中國 Níbó'ěr rén zài zhōngguó चीनमा रहेका नेपालीहरु Cīnamā rahēkā nēpālīharu
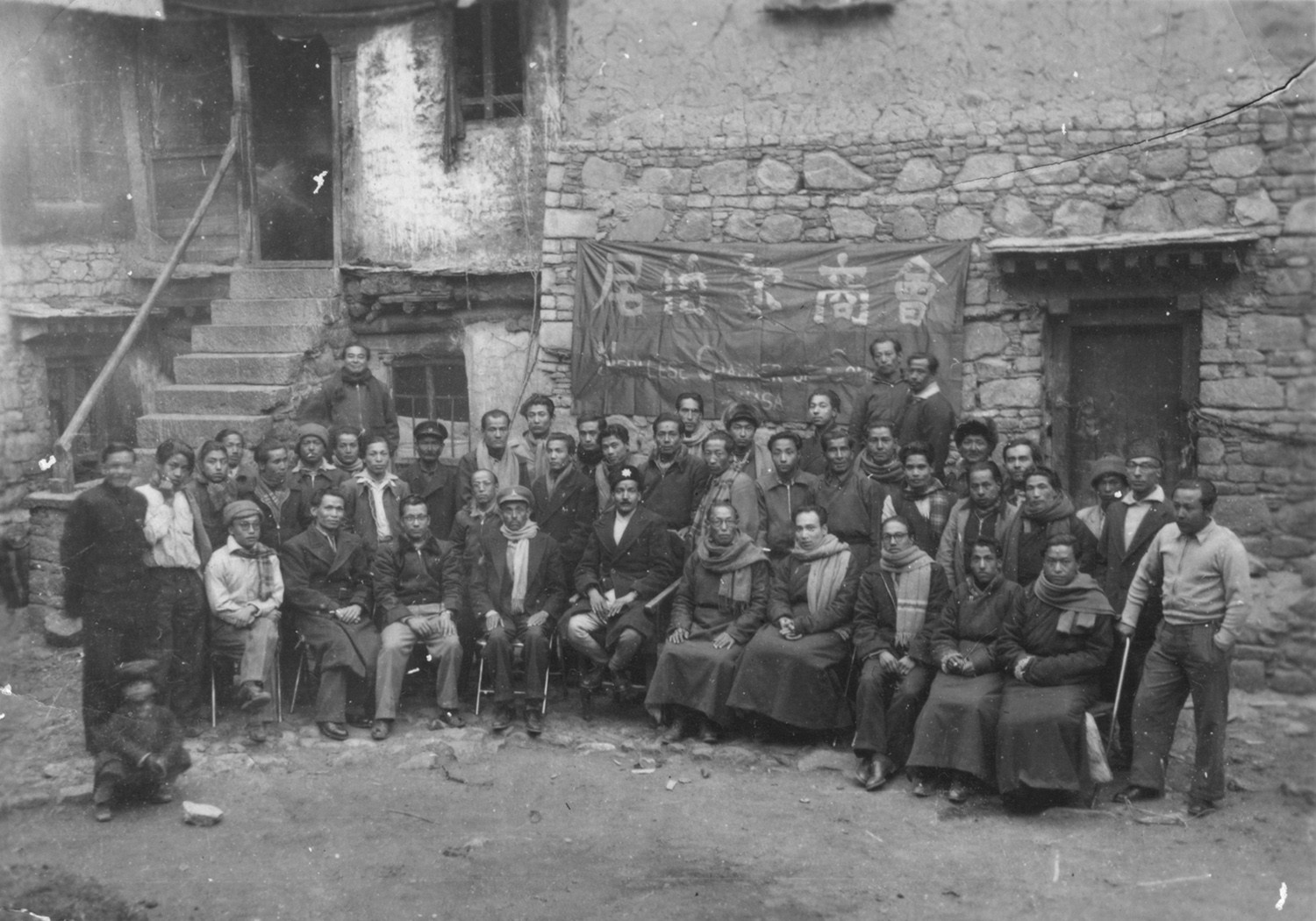
- Nepalese Chamber of Commerce, Lhasa in 1955.

Total population
- 3,500 (Mainland) 15,950 (Hong Kong)

Regions with significant populations
- Tibet: Lhasa · Shigatse · Gyantse; Others: Hong Kong · Guangzhou · Kunming · Dali City

Languages
- Chinese · Tibetan · Newari · Nepali

Religion
- Hinduism

Related ethnic groups
- Nepali diaspora

The community of Nepalis in China consists of Nepalese immigrants and expatriates to China as well as Chinese citizens of Nepalese descent.

== Tibet ==
=== Nepali community in Lhasa ===
==== History ====
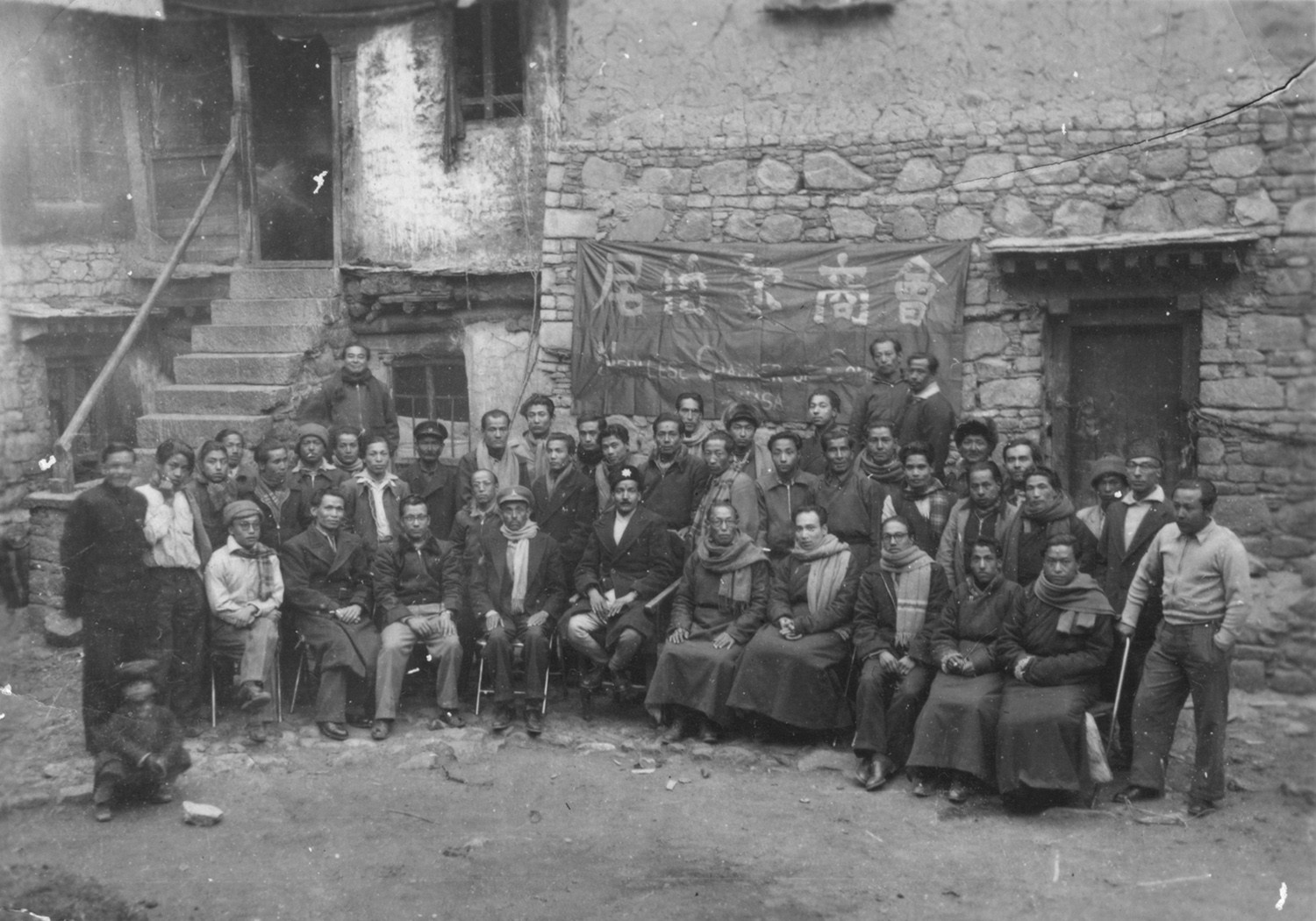
Nepalese Chamber of Commerce, Lhasa in 1955.

The first Nepalis to arrive in Tibet were Newar merchants. In the early Malla period (1100–1480), evidence of Newar expansion emerges. Trade routes to Tibet via Humla, Mustang, Kyirong, Khasa and Olangchung Gola channeled north–south relations. Following the Shah conquest of the Newars, Prithvi Narayan Shah cut off the flow of trade through Kathmandu, depriving the Malla kings of revenue and undermining the Newar traders' support of their own. After the British Younghusband Expedition opened up the shorter trade route to Tibet through Kalimpong, by 1908 Newar traders had lost their advantaged position in the Lhasa trade.

To trade effectively in Tibet, Newar families sent their brothers or sons to the major cities of Lhasa, Shigatse and Gyantse to live for years at a time. Overtime, these men learned to speak Tibetan, took part in the cultural life centered on Buddhism, and many married Tibetan women. In 1943, Nepalese traders based in Lhasa formed the Nepalese Chamber of Commerce in order to promote trade and coordinated among its members to set uniform prices for their merchandise besides lobbying with the government for business-friendly policy.

==== Present ====
The ethnically Nepalese community of Lhasa comprises two prominent groups, Tibetan families who are descendants of Nepalese traders and hotel or restaurant workers from Nepal who come on short-term work visas. The latter, numbering under 100 at least according to consular statistics, are sought after by Lhasa hoteliers for their experience of cooking non-Asian food.

Some of Lhasa's most popular hotels are even owned by mixed Nepali-Tibetan families, known locally as kazara, meaning 'mixed race' in Tibetan. Some of these families have been living in Tibet for more than 300 years, and now speak Chinese alongside Tibetan, Newari and Nepali. While many children attend local Chinese schools, Nepali families may also opt to send their kids to the Gorkha Primary School of Lhasa, established 65 years ago, which has two Nepali teachers and is paid for by the government of Nepal.

=== Kyirong ===
The Nepalese Gurkhas who live in Gyirong Town are classified as Daman people.

=== Zhangmu ===
Some Newari traders settle in Zhangmu, a border town in Nyalam County. There are Sherpa and Kirati communities in Nyalam, Tingri and Zhêntang.

== Hong Kong ==
Nepalis form roughly 0.2% of the total population of Hong Kong. Nepalese people began to come to Hong Kong in the 1970s, as part of the British Army's Brigade of Gurkhas. They continued in this employment until 1997. Their primary duties were to deter illegal immigrants and protect local residents. Most of them lived in Whitfield Barracks and Shek Kong Barracks. After 30 June 1997, the British Government withdrew from Hong Kong and the Gurkha brigade disbanded. These Gurkhas and their children had the right to take up residence in Hong Kong.

There are over 40 NGOs organized by Nepalese in Hong Kong and these social organizations got government licenses. The Southern League Organization and Hong Kong Gurkha (Nepal) associations are the two main NGOs helping the Nepalese community in Hong Kong.

== Other parts of China ==
=== Guangdong ===
A number of Nepalis live and work in Guangzhou consisting mostly of traders and international students from Nepal. The non-Resident Nepalis (NRN) Association in China has demanded that the Chinese government open a Consulate General's Office (CGO) in Guangzhou as the number of Nepalis in the city has soared sharply in recent years after Nepalis residing in Kunming and Hong Kong have started to shift there.

=== Yunnan ===
The Dali University in Dali City, Yunnan have attracted Nepalese students who want to pursue their medical courses there. The Nepali medical students started to arrive here from the year 2005. During that time, just two students were enrolled there, but recently the total number of Nepali medical students has gone up to 175.

== See also ==
- China–Nepal relations
- Indians in China
