= Nepalese community in Fiji =

Nepali diaspora in Fiji

Total population
- 10,000

Regions with significant populations
- Suva · Labasa

Languages
- Fijian · English · Nepali · Fiji Hindi

Religion
- Hinduism · Buddhism

Related ethnic groups
- Nepali people · Indians in Fiji

There is a small Nepalese community in Fiji, scattered all over the two main Islands of Viti Levu and Vanua Levu.

== Migration history ==
The Nepalese community in Fiji are descendants of indentured labourers (known as Girmityas) brought in by the British colonial rulers of Fiji. These Nepali Girmityas came together with the Indian labourers from India under the indentured labour system. The Nepalis settled first in Suva, the capital of Fiji, and then moved around the island to Navua, another large town, and eventually to Kavanagasau, now home of the largest Nepalese community in the islands.

Situated in the "Sand dunes of Singatoka", Kavanagasau is the one place in Viti Levu with mist-shrouded hills and valleys, a landscape which appealed to the Nepalis for its similarity to the Himalayan foothills. Ironically, like much of the Nepalis´ home country, Kavanagasau is not favoured with large tracts of productive land. Here they lease farmland from the Native Fijians and grow sugarcane and vegetables for the market. Most children end their studies after getting a basic high school education and the majority follow in their parent's footsteps as peasant farmers.

== Culture ==
Far from their country of origin, the Fiji-born Nepalis hold on to their way of life. They celebrate Dasain with particular gusto. The Nepalis of Fiji tend to be clannish despite considerable intermarriage with women from the Indian community in the country. The fact is that there were no Nepalese women in the early days, only men came as laborers.

The Nepalese identity has nevertheless remained intact and traditional festivals continue to be observed. Lately, particularly among third generation immigrants, the distinction between the Nepalis and Indians has begun to fade.

== See also ==
- Hinduism in Fiji
