= Nepalis in Austria =

Nepali diaspora in Austria

Total population
- 1,250

Regions with significant populations
- Vienna

Languages
- German (Austrian German), · Nepali

Religion
- Hinduism · Buddhism

Related ethnic groups
- Lhotshampa

Nepalis in Austria are migrants from Nepal to Austria, mostly temporary expatriates, refugees and permanent residents, as well as their locally born descendants. Non-resident Nepalese Association (NRN) Austria is the umbrella organization of Nepalis living in Austria.

== Overview ==
A large number of Nepalis living in Austria are asylum seekers and refugees. They were either Lhotshampas (Bhutanese Nepalis) expelled from Bhutan or Nepali refugees, victims of conflict whose lives were threatened by Maoists or the army in Nepal. Good education in Nepal has become a thing to dream only so some of the people are residing in Austria with a student visa as they want to get the European standard in education. Not all of them want to disclose their identity. Also, due to the free movement within the Schengen Area, it is hard to establish the actual number. The estimated number is around 1,000.

A small number of Nepalis are working in professional position. In United Nations, there are three professional staff (UNIDO), two general service (IAEA and UNOV) and five UN security officers. Outside UN, there are around five or six families of professionals. There are around 150 university and PhD students from Nepal. Around 100 Nepali nationals permanently settled in Austria through job or marital relations.

== See also ==
- Austria–Nepal relations
- Immigration to Austria
- Nepalese diaspora
