= Nepalese New Zealanders =

Nepali diaspora in New Zealand

Total population
- 3,630 (2018)

Regions with significant populations
- Auckland · Hamilton

Languages
- English · Nepali · Maithili

Religion
- Hinduism · Buddhism · Kirant Mundhum · Islam · Christianity

Related ethnic groups
- Non Resident Nepali

Nepalese New Zealanders or Nepali New Zealanders are citizens or permanent residents of New Zealand whose ethnic origins are fully or partially in Nepal.

== Immigrants ==
Many Nepalese New Zealanders work in the dairy industry while there are others who are scholars, social workers and professors.

Hamilton has a small Nepalese community, with some families having gained permanent residence and citizenship, and there are others with student visas.

Many Lhotshampas or Bhutanese Nepalis who were expelled from Bhutan have been resettled in Nelson, after New Zealand offered to settle 600 refugees over five years starting in 2008.

== Festivals ==
The annual Nepal Festival, organized by the various Nepali community organizations in New Zealand, was first held in Auckland in 2009, showcasing Nepalese culture including activities representing the different ethnicities of Nepal.
