= Nepalis in Qatar =

People of Nepali origin settled in Qatar

Total population
- 400,000 (2017)

Regions with significant populations
- Doha

Languages
- Arabic · English • Maithili · Nepali

Religion
- Hinduism · Buddhism · Muslims

Related ethnic groups
- Nepali people

Nepalis in Qatar are migrants from Nepal to Qatar, mostly migrant workers and permanent residents, as well as their locally born descendants. As of May 2017, 400 thousand Nepali Citizens lived in Qatar as migrant workers, Nepal is the second largest expatriate community in Qatar. While there are Nepalese working in the business and administrative sectors of Qatar, most workers from Nepal fall under the umbrella of unskilled labor, and hold jobs in sectors such as construction and landscaping (trading and contracting or sub-contracting companies). Many workers from Nepal are hired to work on the construction of stadiums and railways that are being designed for the 2022 FIFA World Cup to be held in Qatar. According to Time Magazine, due to the terrible working conditions in Qatar, a Nepali worker dies every other day.

In October 2019, the Emir of Qatar approved two amendments in support of migrant labor After giving one month's written notice, employees are now free to leave their jobs under the new legislation. The second reform establishes a 1,000 QAR minimum monthly wage as well as company-provided allowances for food and lodging (300 and 500 QAR, respectively). Regardless of the nationality, everyone is subject to this pay system. The 750 QAR temporary wage was superseded by the minimum wage system, however some nationalities already had greater minimum wages. A minimum wage of 900 QAR was reportedly already paid to Nepali workers. Amnesty International acknowledged these reforms but according to them these reforms should be regularly reviewed to secure just and favorable conditions for the workers.

== Overview ==
Qatar is one of the favorite destinations for Nepali job aspirants who are mostly employed in construction works. All unqualified jobs are done by foreigners especially the Nepalis, who, nowadays, are the most sought after compared to Indians or other nationalities. About 9,650 Nepali nationals arrived in Qatar in December 2010. The Nepalese workers have a reputation of being hardworking, honest, cheap and not prone to complaining. According to the former Nepalese ambassador to Qatar, Surynath Mishra, "Nepali migrant workers have the lowest per capita income in Qatar." According to the ambassador, they lack of education and technical skills mean that "They get exploited the most out of all the migrant workers."

There has also been a steady increase in the number of Nepalese expatriates coming to Qatar to take up employment. There are currently about 100 executives from Nepal in Qatar. A growing number of employers in Qatar are showing more interest hiring engineers, accountants, hotel and travel professionals from Nepal.

== Issues ==
A major concern among the Nepalese officials in Qatar is the rise of deaths of Nepalese workers. Nepalese migrants building the infrastructure to host the 2022 World Cup have died at a rate of one every two days in 2014. According to Nepalese Ambassador Suryanath Mishra, two-thirds of the deaths are caused by stress because they are cheated by employment agencies and his embassy receives about 20 complaints each day from Nepalese victims of such fraud and that about 10 Nepalese return to their home country each day from Qatar because of such scams. The International Trade Union Confederation estimated that the worker death toll could hit 4,000 (nine deaths were associated with the last two World Cups, in Brazil and South Africa) before the 2022 World Cup begins. Nepalese workers in Qatar are forced to work 10- to 14-hour work days, often in extreme heat, with four hours of sleep, and live in cramped accommodations with poor sanitation. Many have gone into debt just to get to Qatar and frequently have to work overtime to make ends meet. Some make only one-third of the money that they are initially promised.

In 2013 a change.org petition began entitled, "End slavery of Nepalese migrant workers in Qatar!" The petition called on the government of Qatar to make specific changes to its migrant worker policy, specifically regarding the country's Nepali workers. Among the demands were:

1. "To ensure humane working conditions to all migrant workers in Qatar. Hailing from the temperate Himalayas, Nepalese migrant workers face a high probability of developing complications toward the 100+ degree Fahrenheit desert heat they work in (often for 12+ hours/day non stop)."
2. "To allow migrant workers to leave their jobs at will as in any other developed nation."
3. "To pay migrant workers a fair and "liveable" wage."
4. "To provide safe working conditions on construction sites."

In 2015, the Nepalese in Qatar made headlines all over the world when, after an earthquake in Nepal killed 8,000 people, Qatar refused to let their Nepalese workers leave to attend the funerals of their family members in Nepal. It was after this moment that the government in Kathmandu publicly criticized FIFA for the first time, insisting that the organization should use its leverage to pressure Qatar into improving working conditions for the 1.5 million migrants employed in Qatar as part of the World Cup construction frenzy. Tek Bahadur Gurung, Nepal's labour minister, said: "After the earthquake of 25 April, we requested all companies in Qatar to give their Nepalese workers special leave and pay for their air fare home. While workers in some sectors of the economy have been given this, those on World Cup construction sites are not being allowed to leave because of the pressure to complete projects on time." He further added that the workers have, "lost relatives and their homes and are enduring very difficult conditions in Qatar. This is adding to their suffering." The labor minister said that conditions for Nepalese workers in Qatar would not change unless FIFA and their sponsors put pressure on the small gulf state. The Nepali government estimates that around $4bn is sent home to Nepal every year by expatriates who work in the Persian Gulf region. This number accounts for nearly 20% of the country's gross domestic product, and is money that would ultimately play an important role in rebuilding Nepal after the two earthquakes. The government of Nepal even offered to pay for the workers' flights home to attend funeral services but the Qatari companies would not allow them bereavement leave.

In October 2015, more than 40 migrant Nepali workers based in Qatar were arrested by Qatari police and sent to the deportation center. The workers had been seeking justice for a year against their employer who had denied them regular payments. According to one Nepali worker, the police came into the labor camp where the workers are housed at midnight to arrest them: "The police arrested all our friends who were sleeping at the camp … Those who were not in the camp escaped the arrest." Prior to their arrest, the workers had issued lawsuits against their employer Metal Farming Centre including at the High Court and Supreme Court of Qatar because they had not been paid in 15 months. The company hired 118 construction workers out of which 88 were Nepal is.

In most cases, when Nepalese workers come to Qatar, they have to pay fees to recruitment officers in Nepal including: processing fees, visa fees, and airplane tickets. This means that Nepali workers arrive in Qatar in a massive amount of debt before they even begin working. In 2016, Narayan Kaji Shrestha, head of the Unified Communist Party of Nepal, went to Qatar and asked the Qatari government to assist in a plan to minimize processing fees for laborers by monitoring the companies that hire Nepali workers and by helping to implement a "free ticket, free visa" system. In Qatar it is illegal to charge recruitment fees, however the practice exists in Nepal. A 2014 report commissioned by the Qatar Foundation showed that recruitment fees for workers average $1,300.

In 2018, Qatari authorities opened recruitment centres in eight countries to address "contract substitution" and establish a clear framework that worked in favor of the migrants workers. The migrant workers must go to these centres to complete various administrative tasks and sign their contracts before departure.

== See also ==
- Nepalis in the United Arab Emirates
- Hinduism in Qatar
- Buddhism in Qatar
