= Nepalis in Saudi Arabia =

People of Nepali origin settled in Soudi Arabia

Total population
- 215,000

Regions with significant populations
- Riyadh · Jeddah

Languages
- Arabic • Maithili · Nepali

Religion
- Hinduism · Buddhism · Islam

Related ethnic groups
- Nepali people

Nepalis in Saudi Arabia are immigrants from Nepal to the Kingdom of Saudi Arabia, mostly migrant workers and expatriates. Saudi Arabia has emerged as one of the top destinations for migrant Nepalese laborers. Approximately 215,000 Nepalese laborers, skilled and semi-skilled, work in the country. Most of them belong to the Madhesi race totalling up to 199,757, and the remainder predominantly belong to the Bahun and Chhetri ethnicities.

== Labor issues ==
According to Human Rights Watch, the kafala system in Saudi Arabia has subjected thousands of migrant workers to be abused by their employers in ways such as non-payment of wages, forced confinement in workplace, confiscation of passports, excessive work hours with little rest, physical and sexual abuse, and forced labor including trafficking. Nepalese embassy officials in Saudi Arabia said about 70,000 to 80,000 Nepalis in the country are trapped under critical working conditions. In October 2023, reports emerged of Nepali laborers at Amazon warehouses in Saudi Arabia being mistreated, which included poor-quality housing and deceptive labor practices such as requiring large recruiting and exit fees.

== See also ==
- Foreign workers in Saudi Arabia
- Migrant workers in the Gulf Cooperation Council region
  - Treatment of South Asian labourers in the Gulf Cooperation Council region
