= Consulate General of Nepal, Dallas =

Diplomatic Mission of Nepal in Dallas, USA

- नेपाली महावाणिज्यदूतावास, डालस
- Location: Dallas, United States
- Address: 1230 River Bend Dr #220, Dallas, TX 75247, United States
- Coordinates: 32°48′59.9″N 96°51′46.9″W
- Jurisdiction: United States (Arkansas; Colorado; Kansas; Louisiana; Mississippi; New Mexico; Oklahoma; Texas)
- Consul General: Suresh Adhikari
- Website: Official website

The Consulate General of Nepal in Dallas (Nepali: नेपाली महावाणिज्यदूतावास, डलास) is the consular representation of the Federal Democratic Republic of Nepal to the United States of America. Its jurisdiction covers the American states of Arkansas, Colorado, Kansas, Louisiana, Mississippi, New Mexico, Oklahoma and Texas. It is located at 1230 River Bend Drive, Suite 220, in Dallas, Texas.

The consulate general is responsible for the protection and administrative affairs of the Nepali nationals settled and traveling within the American South and Midwest. It reports to the Embassy of Nepal in Washington, D.C..

== History ==
The Government of Nepal decided to expand its diplomatic presence in the United States on January 10, 2025, in order to accommodate the rapidly growing Nepali diaspora in the country. This expansion led to the establishment of this Consulate General in Dallas on July 8, 2025.

== Functions ==
The office works to streamline administrative tasks for the states under its jurisdiction providing biometric passport renewals, processing Non-Resident Nepali (NRN) identity cards, and handling the authentication of powers of attorney and other legal certificates.

== See also ==
- Embassy of Nepal, Washington, D.C.
- List of diplomatic missions of Nepal
- List of diplomatic missions in United States
- Nepal-United States relations
