= Consulate General of Nepal, New York City =

Consular Mission of Nepal in New York, USA

Consulate General of Nepal, New York
- नेपाली महावाणिज्यदूतावास, न्यूयोर्क
- Location: New York City, United States
- Address: 228 E 45th St 4th Floor, New York, NY 10017, United States
- Coordinates: 40°45′06.9″N 73°58′18.6″W
- Jurisdiction: United States (New York; New Jersey; Connecticut; Pennsylvania; Massachusetts; Rhode Island; New Hampshire; Vermont; Maine)
- Consul General: Dadhiram Bhandari
- Website: Official website

The Consulate General of Nepal in New York (Nepali: नेपाली महावाणिज्यदूतावास, न्यूयोर्क) is the consular representation of the Federal Democratic Republic of Nepal to the United States of America in New York City. Its jurisdiction covers the American states of New York, New Jersey, Connecticut, Pennsylvania, Massachusetts, Rhode Island, New Hampshire, Vermont and Maine. It is located at 228 East 45th Street (4th Floor) in the Midtown Manhattan neighborhood of New York City.

The Consulate General is responsible for providing passport and consular services, protecting the welfare of Nepali nationals and overseeing Nepal's diplomatic interests in the assigned regional jurisdiction. It reports to the Embassy of Nepal in Washington, D.C..

== History ==
For decades, the consular responsibilities for New York region was concurrently handled by the Permanent Mission of Nepal to the UN in New York but, to accommodate the rapidly growing Nepali diaspora in the region, the Government of Nepal officially established a separate and distinct mission in 2016.

== Functions and services ==
The Consulate General serves the Northeast region of the United States, managing administrative tasks, consular services, trade and tourism promotion, passport support and issuance of Non-Resident Nepali (NRN) identity cards for the broader Nepali diaspora in the region.

== See also ==
- Embassy of Nepal, Washington, D.C.
- List of diplomatic missions of Nepal
- List of diplomatic missions in United States
- Nepal-United States relations
