= Embassy of Nepal, Ottawa =

Diplomatic Mission of Nepal in Canada

- नेपाली राजदूतावास, ओटावा
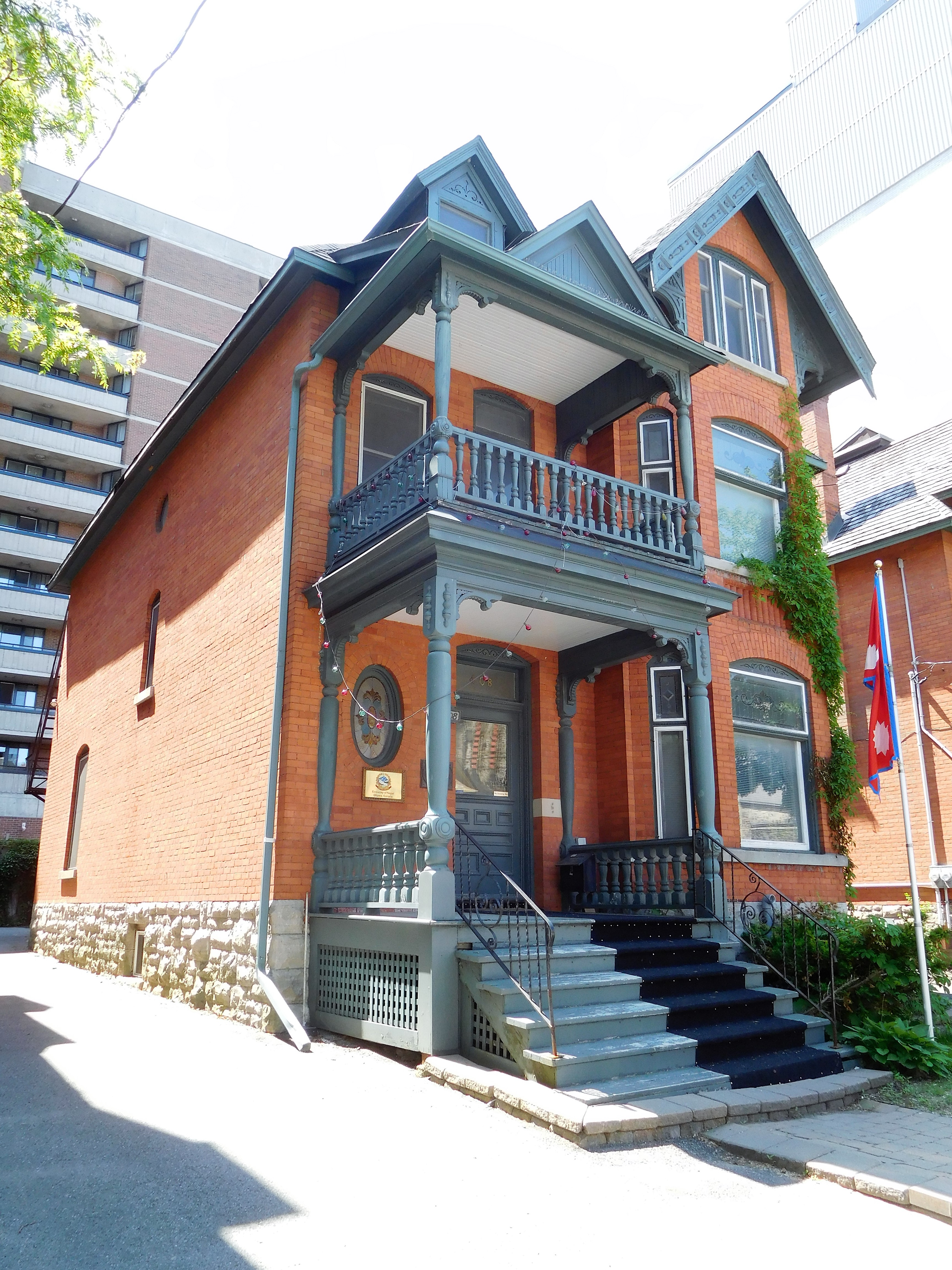
- Location: Ottawa, Canada
- Address: 408 Queen St, Ottawa, ON K1R 5A7, Canada
- Coordinates: 45°25′03.4″N 75°42′25.7″W
- Ambassador: Bharat Raj Paudyal
- Jurisdiction: Canada
- Website: Official website

The Embassy of Nepal in Ottawa (Nepali: नेपाली राजदूतावास, ओटावा) is the resident diplomatic mission of Federal Democratic Republic of Nepal to Canada. It is located at 408 Queen Street in the downtown core of Ottawa, Ontario.

The embassy plays a vital role in deepening Canada-Nepal relations and oversees Nepal's diplomatic interests in Canada and consular services to the Nepali diaspora in Canada.

== History ==
Nepal and Canada formally established diplomatic relations on 18 January 1965. Nepal established its residential embassy in Ottawa on 1 October 2009, while the High Commission of Canada in New Delhi, India, is concurrently accredited to Nepal. Additionally, Nepal maintains an Honorary consulate in Montreal and Victoria while Canada maintains one in Kathmandu.

== Concurrent Accreditations ==
The ambassador of Nepal to Canada is concurrently accredited to the following:

=== Countries ===
- Cuba
- Dominican Republic
- Haiti
- Jamaica

=== International organisation ===
- International Civil Aviation Organization

== Functions and Services ==
The embassy oversees Nepal's diplomatic interests in Canada and the accredited countries and organisations. The core functions of the embassy include consular services, diaspora and Non-resident Nepali citizens' support, and promoting trade and tourism to Nepal.

== See also ==
- Diplomatic missions of Nepal
- Diplomatic missions in Canada
- Canada-Nepal relations
