= Embassy of Nepal, Cairo =

Diplomatic Mission of Nepal in Egypt

- नेपाली राजदूतावास, कायरो
- Location: Cairo, Egypt
- Address: 23 Mohammed Mazhar, Zamalek, Cairo Governorate 4271174, Egypt
- Coordinates: 30.0679259°N 31.2229771°E
- Ambassador: Sushil Kumar Lamsal
- Jurisdiction: Egypt
- Website: Official website

The Embassy of Nepal in Cairo (Nepali: नेपाली राजदूतावास, कायरो; Arabic: سفارة نيبال في القاهرة) is the diplomatic mission of Federal Democratic Republic of Nepal to the Arab Republic of Egypt. It is located at 23 Mohammed Mazhar Street in the Zamalek district of Cairo.

The embassy plays a critical role in maintaining Egypt-Nepal relations and oversees Nepal's diplomatic interests in Egypt and also concurrently handles relation and consular services in neighbouring countries whom it's accredited to.

== History ==
Bilateral ties between Egypt and Nepal were officially established on July 16, 1957. In order to deepen strategic ties, Nepal opened its resident embassy in Cairo in 1966 and Egypt followed by establishing its own embassy in Kathmandu in 1970.

== Concurrent Accreditations ==
Due to Nepal's limited resident diplomatic presence in the African continent and North-Western Arab, the ambassador of Nepal to Egypt is concurrently accredited to the following:

=== Countries ===
- Algeria
- Cameroon
- Djibouti
- Eritrea
- Ethiopia
- Gambia
- Ghana
- Guinea
- Jordan
- Lebanon
- Libya
- Mali
- Mauritania
- Morocco
- Niger
- Nigeria
- Sierra Leone
- Rwanda
- South Sudan
- Sudan
- Syria
- Togo
- Tunisia
- Uganda

== Functions and Services ==
The embassy performs a range of diplomatic and consular functions, including:

1. Representing Nepal and its diplomatic interests in Egypt
2. Promoting tourism to Nepal in Egypt and Arab world
3. Issuing Visa and travel related documents
4. Coordinating official visits and diplomatic engagements, etc.

== Ambassador ==
The embassy is headed by the Ambassador of Nepal to Egypt, appointed by the Government of Nepal. The current Ambassador is Sushil Kumar Lamsal.

== See also ==
- Egypt-Nepal relations
- List of diplomatic missions of Nepal
- List of diplomatic missions in Egypt
- Foreign relations of Nepal
