= Embassy of Nepal, Manama =

- नेपाली राजदूतावास, मनामा
- Location: Manama, Bahrain
- Address: Villa No. 2397, Road No. 2437, Block No. 324, Manama
- Coordinates: 26°12′52.7″N 50°36′46.5″E
- Ambassador: Tirtha Raj Wagle
- Jurisdiction: Bahrain
- Website: Official website

The Embassy of Nepal in Manama (Nepali: नेपाली राजदूतावास, मनामा; Arabic: سفارة نيبال، المنامة) is the diplomatic mission of Federal Democratic Republic of Nepal to the Kingdom of Bahrain. It is located at Villa 2397, Road 2437, Area 324, in the Juffair neighborhood of Manama.

The embassy plays a vital role in deepening Bahrain-Nepal relations and oversees Nepal's diplomatic interests in Bahrain and provides consular services to the Nepali diaspora and migrant workers in Bahrain.

== History ==
Nepal and Bahrain established formal diplomatic ties on 13 January 1977. With the motive to deepen bilateral ties and support the Nepali migrant worker community in Bahrain, the Government of Nepal established the residential embassy in Manama on 1 September 2013.

== Functions and Services ==
The embassy is responsible for providing essential administrative and consular services to the substantial Nepalese diaspora and migrant workers residing in Bahrain. Its core responsibilities include processing passport renewals, issuing tourist visas, translating official legal documents, and registering vital statistics.

== See also ==
- List of diplomatic missions of Nepal
- List of diplomatic missions in Bahrain
- Foreign relations of Nepal
- Foreign relations of Bahrain
