= Embassy of Nepal, Brasília =

Diplomatic mission of Nepal in Brazil

- नेपाली राजदूतावास, ब्राजिलिया
- Location: Brasília, Brazil
- Address: Casa, Shis Qi 11 Conjunto 3, 20 - Plano Piloto, Brasília - DF, 71625-230, Brazil
- Coordinates: 15°50′00.8″S 47°52′22.8″W
- Ambassador: Nirmal Raj Kafle
- Jurisdiction: Brazil
- Website: Official website

The Embassy of Nepal in Brasília (Nepali: नेपाली राजदूतावास, ब्राजिलिया; Portuguese: Embaixada do Nepal em Brasília) is the permanent resident diplomatic mission of Federal Democratic Republic of Nepal to the Federative Republic of Brazil. It is located at SHIS QI 11, Conjunto 3, Casa 20 in the Lago Sul neighborhood of Brasília.

The embassy was established in 2010 to deepen Brazil-Nepal relations, making it the only residential diplomatic mission of Nepal in the entire continent of South America.

== History ==
Bilateral ties between Brazil and Nepal were formally established on February 7, 1976. Nepal and Brazil lacked residential diplomatic missions in each other's capital until Nepal established its embassy in Brasília on January 21, 2010, and Brazil followed the move by establishing its own embassy in Kathmandu in October 2011.

== Concurrent Accreditations ==
As being the only resident diplomatic mission of Nepal in the entire South America, the ambassador of Nepal to Brazil is concurrently accredited to the following:

=== Countries ===
- Barbados
- Antigua and Barbuda
- Argentina
- Bolivia
- Chile
- Colombia
- Dominica
- Guyana
- Paraguay
- Peru
- Saint Kitts and Nevis
- Saint Lucia
- Saint Vincent and the Grenadines
- Suriname
- Uruguay
- Venezuela
- Trinidad and Tobago

== Functions and Services ==
The embassy is responsible for maintaining Nepal's diplomatic interests in South America and executing Consular services, economic and trade diplomacy and cultural and tourism promotion within Brazil and South America.

== See also ==
- List of diplomatic missions of Nepal
- List of diplomatic missions in Brazil
- Foreign relations of Nepal
