= Italy–Nepal relations =

Nepal–Italy relations
- Nepal: Italy

Nepal–Italy relations are foreign relations between Nepal and Italy.

Nepal–Italy relations were officially established on 31 August 1959.

== See also ==
- Foreign relations of Italy
- Foreign relations of Nepal
