= Embassy of Nepal, Pretoria =

Diplomatic Mission of Nepal in South Africa

- नेपाली राजदूतावास, प्रेटोरिया
- Location: Pretoria, South Africa
- Address: 976 Francis Baard St, Arcadia, Pretoria, 0028, South Africa
- Coordinates: 25°44′47.1″S 28°13′43.9″E
- Ambassador: Kapil Man Shrestha
- Jurisdiction: South Africa
- Website: Official website

The Embassy of Nepal in Pretoria (Nepali: नेपाली राजदूतावास, प्रेटोरिया) is the diplomatic mission of Federal Democratic Republic of Nepal to the Republic of South Africa. It is located at 976 Francis Baard Street in the Arcadia district of Pretoria.

The embassy serves for Nepal's diplomatic interests in Southern and Eastern African regions, oversees South Africa-Nepal relations and concurrently manages diplomatic relations with accredited nations.

== History ==
Nepal and South Africa formally established diplomatic relations on July 28, 1994, shortly after South Africa's transition into multi-racial democracy. With the motive to deepen bilateral ties and increase Nepal's diplomatic presence in broader South African region, Nepal established its residential embassy in Pretoria in December 2009.

== Concurrent Accreditation ==
Due to Nepal's limited residential diplomatic presence across the African continent, the ambassador of Nepal to South Africa is concurrently accredited to following:

=== Countries ===
- Angola
- Benin
- Botswana
- Burkina Faso
- Burundi
- Cape Verde
- Democratic Republic of Congo
- Equatorial Guinea
- Eswatini
- Gabon
- Ivory Coast
- Kenya
- Lesotho
- Liberia
- Madagascar
- Malawi
- Mauritius
- Mozambique
- Seychelles
- Tanzania
- Zambia
- Zimbabwe

=== International organisations ===
- United Nations Environment Programme

== Functions and Services ==
The embassy is responsible for protecting the interests of Nepal and its citizens within its jurisdiction such as consular services, trade and tourism promotion and diaspora support.

== See also ==
- List of diplomatic missions of Nepal
- List of diplomatic missions in South Africa
- Foreign relations of Nepal
