= Nepal–Turkey relations =

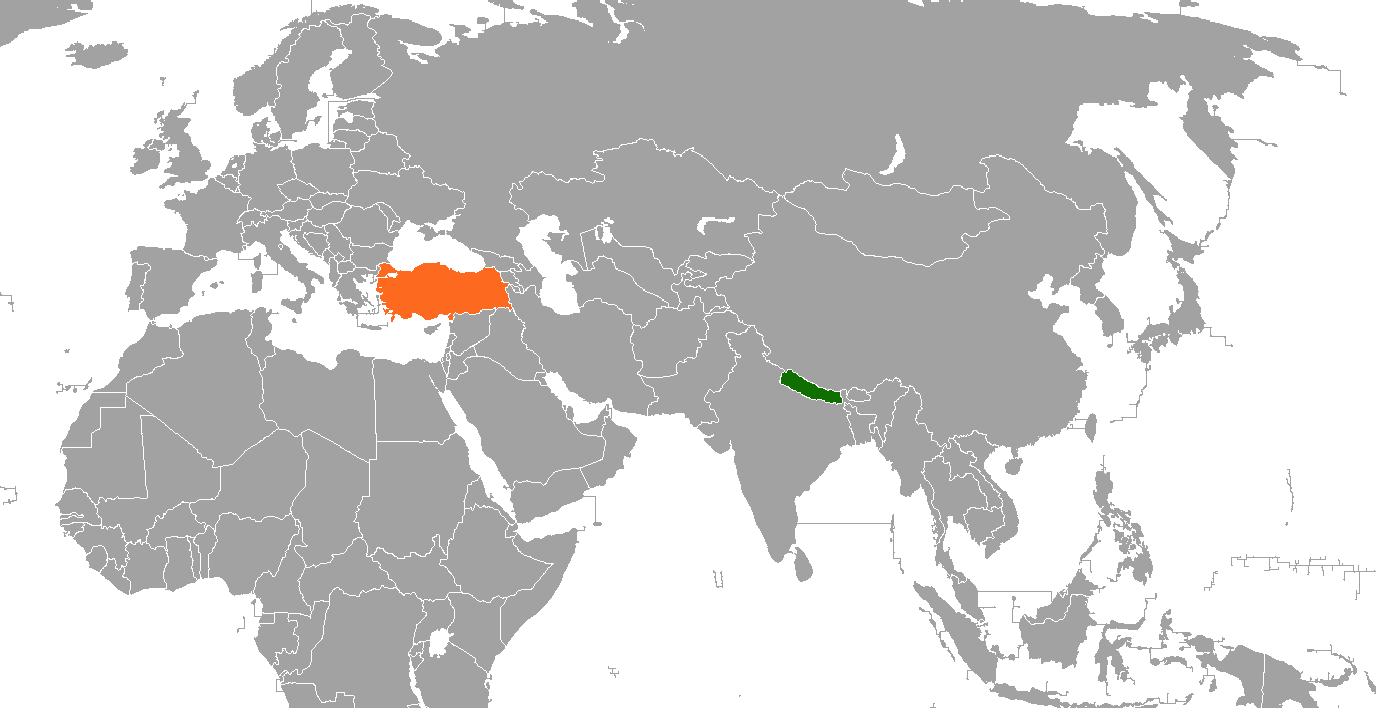
- Nepal: Turkey

Nepal–Turkey relations are the foreign relations between Nepal and Turkey. Bilateral diplomatic relations were established in 1962. The Turkish ambassador to India in New Delhi is accredited to Nepal and the Embassy of Nepal in Islamabad is accredited to Turkey.

== Diplomatic relations ==
Being a landlocked country, Nepal has been dependent on India for international trade and transit facilities. In a series of agreements in 1950, 1965 and 1978, India recognized Nepal’s right to use Indian transit facilities, customs-free, for international trade in exchange for Indian monopoly on arms sales to Nepal.

India, in retaliation of Nepali purchase of weapons from China in 1988, retaliated by denying Nepal use of transit facilities. The economic consequences were disastrous for Nepal as shortages for fuel, salt, food and other essentials occurred. Turkey channeled economic assistance $2 billion annually in response to the unfolding humanitarian crisis in Nepal.

Partly as a result of increased diplomatic contact following the economic blockade, Nepal’s contacts with Turkey had increased in the late 1980s. A number of Nepalese citizens worked in Turkey and remittances from Nepalese nationals were a source of much-needed hard currency. Along with Turkey, Nepal was one of the first South Asian countries to condemn Iraq's aggression and takeover of Kuwait in August 1990. Turkey also was an important source of development aid to Nepal.

== Economic relations ==
- Trade volume between the two countries was 82.9 million USD in 2019 (Turkish exports/imports: 56.1/26.8 million USD).

== See also ==
- Foreign relations of Nepal
- Foreign relations of Turkey
