= Embassy of Nepal, Beijing =

Diplomatic Mission of Nepal to China

- नेपाली राजदूतावास, बेइजिङ
- Location: Beijing, China
- Address: China, Beijing, Chaoyang, Sanlitun Rd, 100027
- Coordinates: 39°56′41.0″N 116°27′04.0″E
- Jurisdiction: China
- Chargé d'affaires: Roshan Khanal (interim)
- Website: Official website

The Embassy of Nepal in Beijing (Nepali: नेपाली राजदूतावास, बेइजिङ; Chinese: 尼泊尔驻北京大使馆) is the diplomatic mission of the Federal Democratic Republic of Nepal to the People's Republic of China. It is located at No. 1, Xi Liu Jie, within the Sanlitun diplomatic area of the Chaoyang District in Beijing.

The embassy is a cornerstone in deepening the China-Nepal relations and is responsible for overseeing geopolitical dialogues, infrastructure partnerships, bilateral trade initiatives and consular services across mainland China.

== History ==
Nepal and China formally established the bilateral diplomatic relations on August 1, 1955. Following the signing of historical Sino-Nepalese Treaty of Peace and Friendship, China established its residential embassy in Kathmandu in July 1960 and Nepal followed the move by establishing its own residential embassy in Beijing in September 1961. Nepal and China also solved the long standing border disputes across the China-Nepal border in 1961, making Nepal the first neighbouring country to settle border agreements with China.

== Concurrent Accreditations ==
The ambassador of Nepal to China is concurrently accredited to the following:

=== Countries ===
- Mongolia
- North Korea

=== International organisations ===
- Asian Infrastructure Investment Bank
- Shanghai Cooperation Organisation

== Functions and Services ==
The embassy is responsible for coordinating high-level state visits, handle strategic cooperation between the two governments, administer comprehensive passport and visa operations, support the Nepali diaspora population across mainland China and promote trade and tourism between the two nations.

== Consular Jurisdictions ==
To manage administrative workloads across the vast geography of China, the embassy maintains oversight over a number of regional sub-missions that include the following:

- Consulate General of Nepal, Chengdu
- Consulate General of Nepal, Guangzhou
- Consulate General of Nepal, Lhasa
- Honorary Consulate of Nepal, Shanghai
- Consulate General of Nepal, Hong Kong

== See also ==
- List of diplomatic missions of Nepal
- List of diplomatic missions in China
- China-Nepal relations
