= Consulate General of Nepal, San Francisco =

Diplomatic Mission of Nepal in San Francisco, USA

- नेपाली महावाणिज्यदूतावास, सान फ्रान्सिस्को
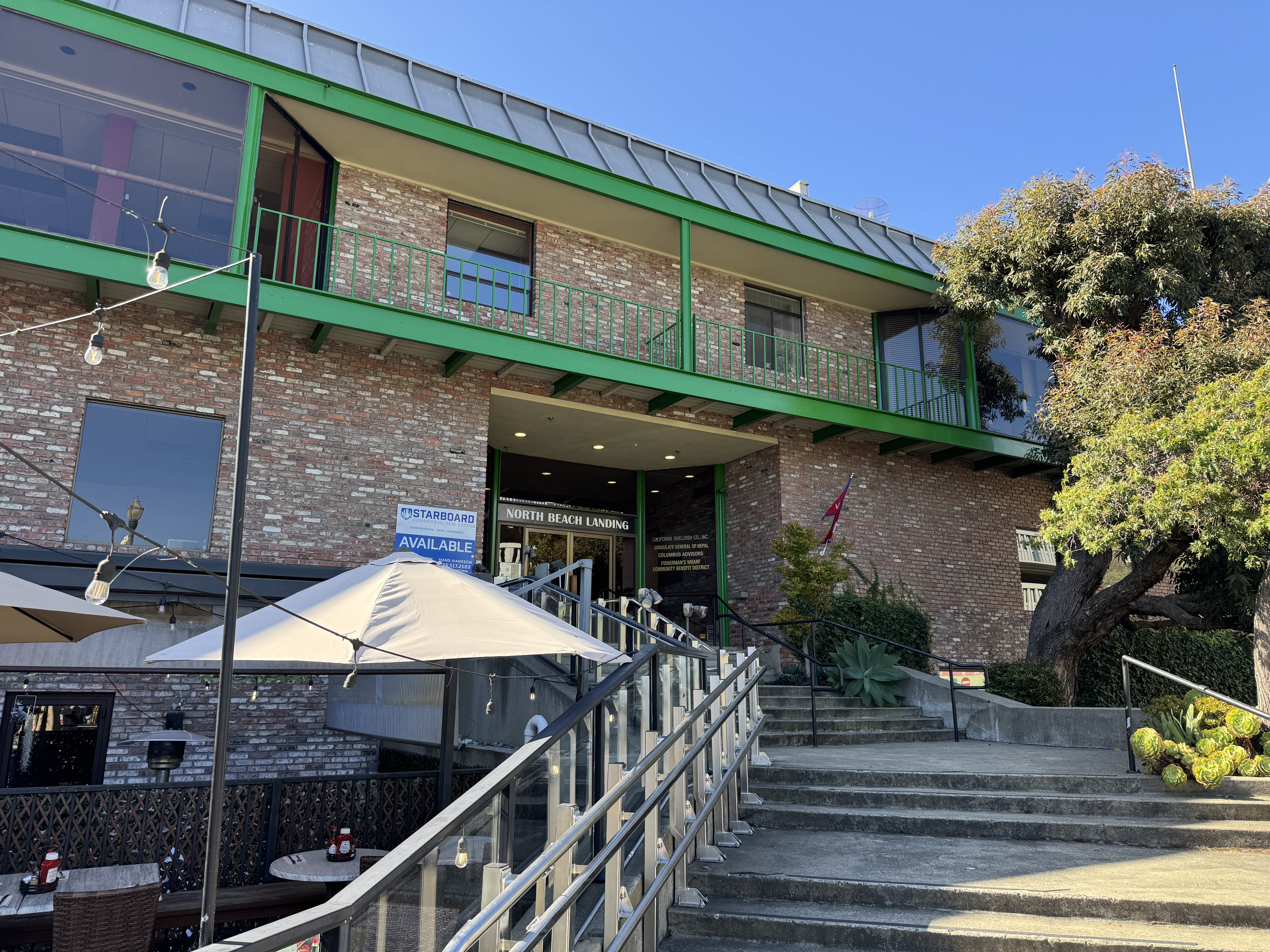
- Location: San Francisco, United States
- Address: 505 Beach St, San Francisco, CA 94133, United States
- Coordinates: 37°48′24.5″N 122°25′03.4″W
- Jurisdiction: United States (California; Arizona; Nevada; Utah; Wyoming; Idaho; Oregon; Montana; Washington; Hawaii; Alaska)
- Consul General: Lakshuman Khanal
- Website: Official website

The Consulate General of Nepal in San Francisco (Nepali: नेपाली महावाणिज्यदूतावास, सान फ्रान्सिस्को) is the consular representation of the Federal Democratic Republic of Nepal to the United States of America in San Francisco. Its jurisdiction covers the American states of California, Arizona, Nevada, Utah, Wyoming, Idaho, Oregon, Montana, Washington, Hawaii and Alaska. It is located at 505 Beach Street, Suite 130, near the Fisherman's Wharf district of San Francisco, California.

The Consulate General is responsible for providing passport and consular services, protecting the welfare of Nepali nationals and overseeing Nepal's diplomatic interests in the assigned regional jurisdiction. It reports to the Embassy of Nepal in Washington, D.C..

== History ==
The Government of Nepal decided to expand its diplomatic presence in the United States on January 10, 2025, in order to accommodate the rapidly growing Nepali diaspora in the country. This expansion led to the establishment of this Consulate General in Dallas on July 1, 2025.

== Functions and services ==
The office works to streamline administrative tasks for the states under its jurisdiction providing biometric passport renewals, processing Non-Resident Nepali (NRN) identity cards, and handling the authentication of powers of attorney and other legal certificates.

== See also ==
- Embassy of Nepal, Washington, D.C.
- List of diplomatic missions of Nepal
- List of diplomatic missions in the United States
