= Denmark–Nepal relations =

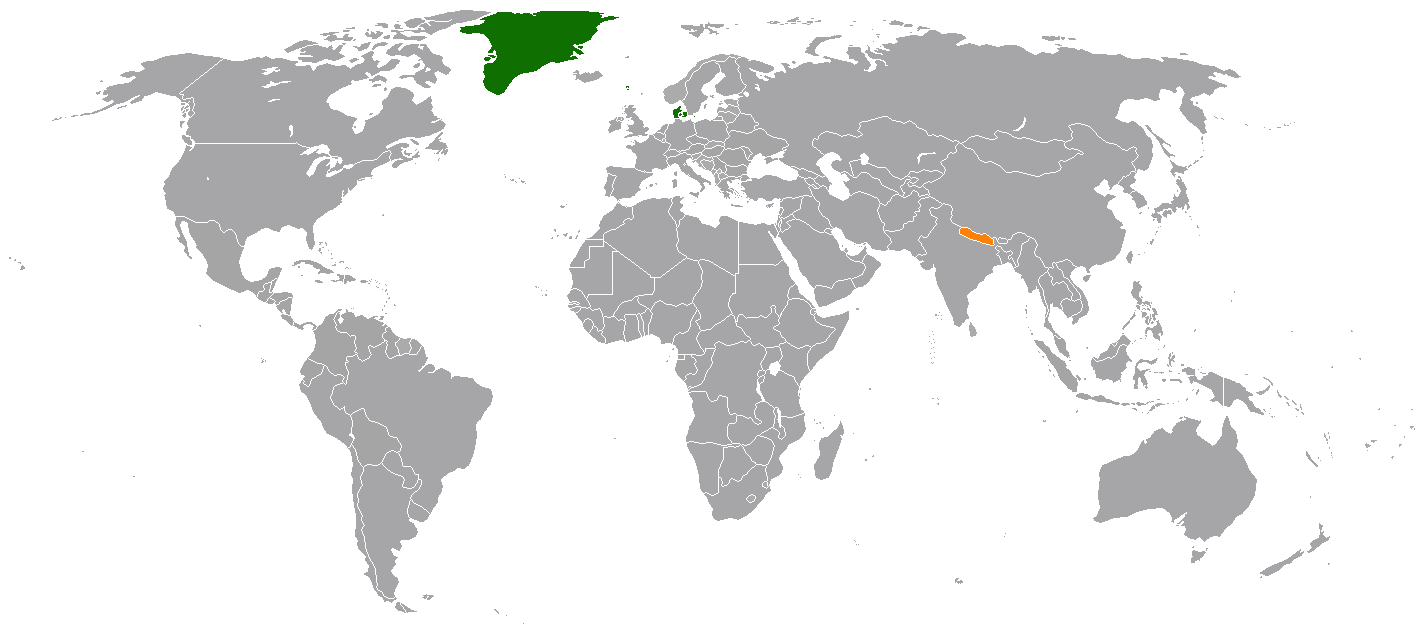
- Denmark: Nepal

Denmark–Nepal relations are foreign relations between Denmark and Nepal. Denmark had an embassy in Kathmandu from 1992 to 2017 and since then an Honorary Consulate. Nepal has had an embassy in Copenhagen since 2007. Nepal and Denmark established diplomatic relations on 15 December 1967.

== Aid ==
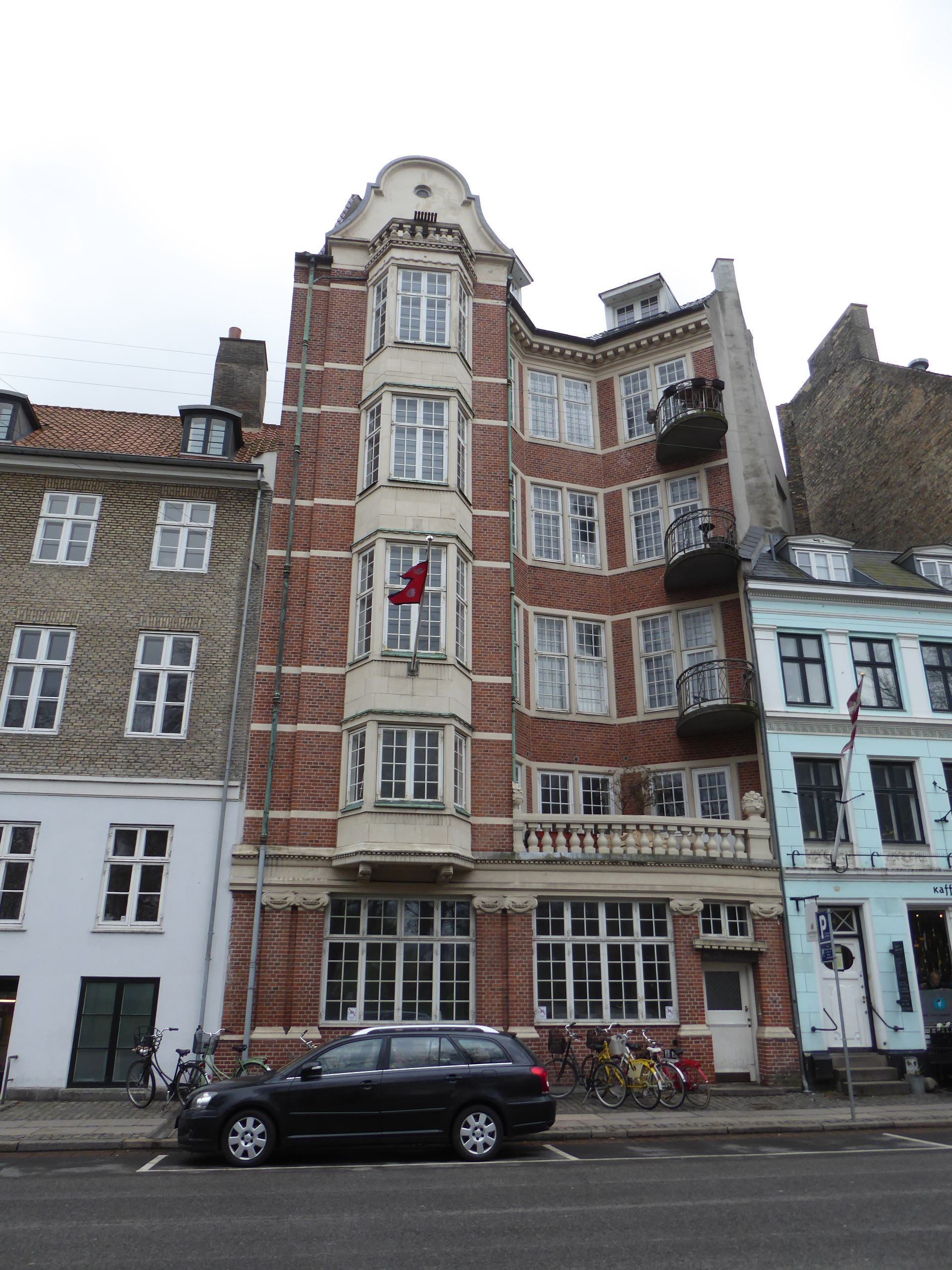
Embassy of Nepal in Copenhagen

Denmark has given aid to Nepal since 1990. In 1973, 20 million DKK was given to Nepal for the economic cooperation. In 1997, Denmark agreed to provide assistance of 644 million DKK to various projects.

It gave 200 million DKK for education cooperation in 2003. In 2006, Danish Minister for Development Cooperation Ulla Tørnæs visited Nepal. Denmark assisted with 70 million DKK again for education in 2009. Denmark has for 20 years assisted Nepalese families with electricity and renewable energy.

== Children Nepal Denmark ==
Children Nepal Denmark was established in October 2001. When Peer Ortvalds visited Nepal in 1999, he was inspired by Children Nepal Denmark's achievements. Peer Ortvald decided that he would continue to help disadvantaged children in Nepal after his return to Denmark.

== Trade ==
Denmark exports food and machinery to Nepal, while Nepal exports pashminas to Denmark.

== See also ==
- Foreign relations of Denmark
- Foreign relations of Nepal
