= Consulate General of Nepal, Chengdu =

Diplomatic Mission of Nepal in Chengdu, China

- नेपाली महावाणिज्यदूतावास, छेन्दु
- Location: Chengdu, China
- Address: 303, Building 20, Tianfu International Community, No 888, Hi Tech Zone, Chengdu
- Coordinates: 30°33′33.9″N 104°03′14.0″E
- Jurisdiction: China (Sichuan Province; Guizhou Province; Chongqing Municipality)
- Consul General: Suresh Raut
- Website: Official website

The Consulate General of Nepal, Chengdu (Nepali: नेपाली महावाणिज्यदूतावास, छेन्दु; Chinese: 尼泊尔驻成都总领事馆) is the consular representation of the Federal Democratic Republic of Nepal to the People's Republic of China. Its jurisdiction covers Sichuan Province, Guizhou Province and Chongqing Municipality. It is located in Room 303, Building 20, Tianfu International Community, No. 888, Tianfu 1st Street, Hi-Tech Zone, Chengdu, Sichuan, China.

The consulate focuses primarily on enhancing economic cooperation, bilateral trade, tourism, and diplomatic connections between Nepal and the southwestern regions of China. It reports to the Embassy of Nepal, Beijing.

== History ==
The opening of a consulate in Chengdu was first planned by the Government of Nepal around 2016 to keep pace with expanding trade corridors through southwestern China. The mission was officially inaugurated on May 24, 2021, making it Nepal's fifth overall diplomatic mission in China.

== Functions ==
The office works to streamline administrative tasks for the regions under its jurisdiction providing consular services, promoting connectivity and aviation, facilitating trade and tourism between Nepal and southwestern China.

== See also ==
- Embassy of Nepal, Beijing
- List of diplomatic missions of Nepal
- List of diplomatic missions in China
- China-Nepal relations
