= Canada–Nepal relations =

- Nepal: Canada

Foreign relations between Canada and the Federal Democratic Republic of Nepal were first established in 1965.

== History ==
Relations were first established 18 January 1965, although earlier both nations were a part of the Colombo Plan. In 1970, the Canadian International Development Agency began distributing aid in Nepal. In 2003, a duty-free agreement was signed between the two nations. Nepal maintains an embassy on Queen Street in Ottawa, and has honorary consulates in Toronto, Montreal, Calgary, and Victoria, British Columbia. Canada's high commission in New Delhi is accredited to Nepal and maintains an honorary consulate in Kathmandu.

Consulate of Canada in Tallinn
- Location: Kathmandu
- Address: P884+9VP, Kathmandu 44600
- Ambassador: Buddha Basnyat

Canada has issued nearly $500 million in aid to Nepal throughout the course of relations, including $50 million for the April 2015 Nepal earthquake.

== Resident diplomatic missions ==
Canada maintains an Honorary Consulate in Kathmandu and Nepal maintains an embassy in Ottawa.

Embassy of Nepal in Ottawa
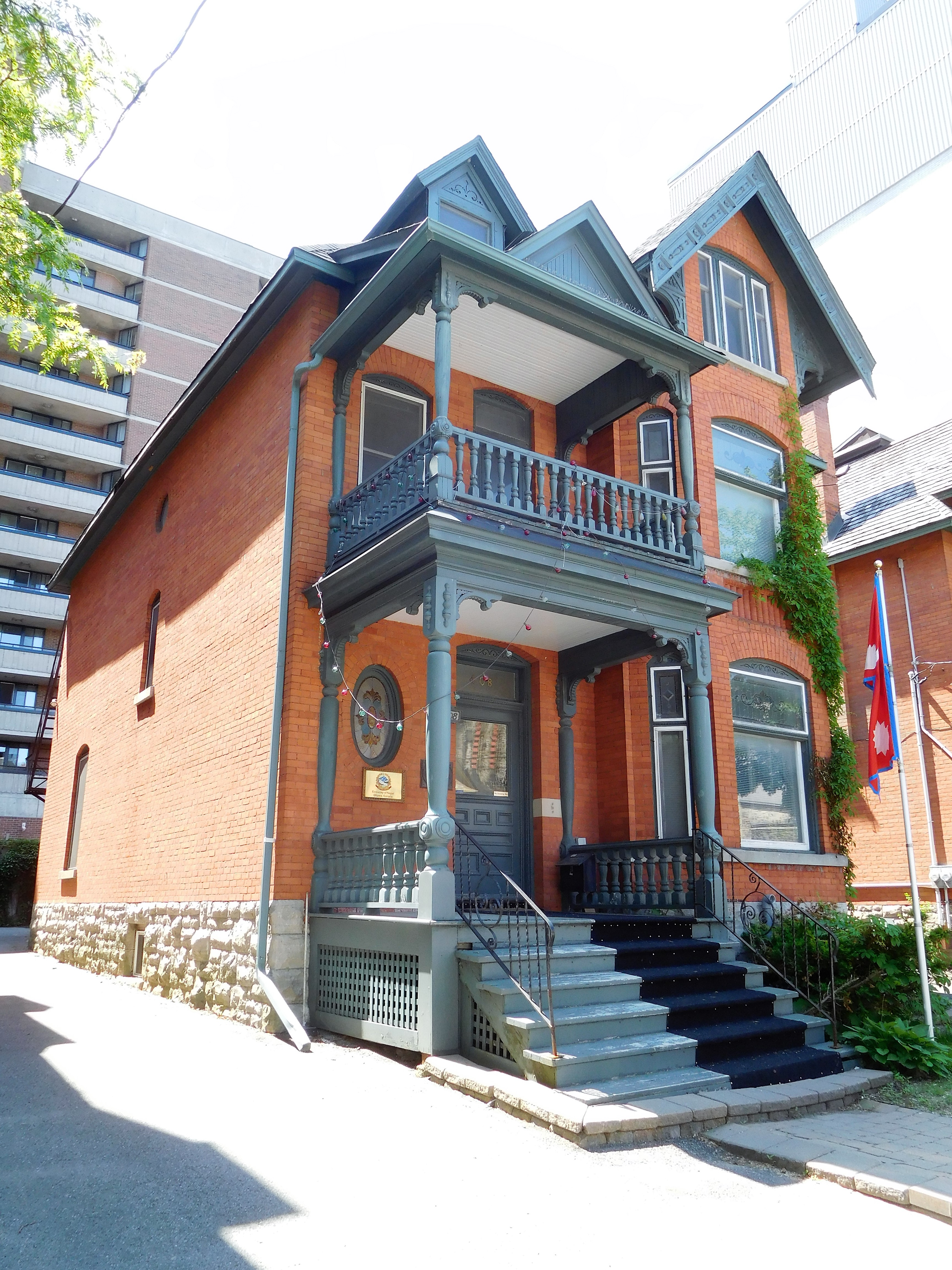
- Embassy of Nepal in Ottawa
- Location: Ottawa
- Address: 408 Queen St K1R 5A7
- Ambassador: Bharat Raj Paudyal

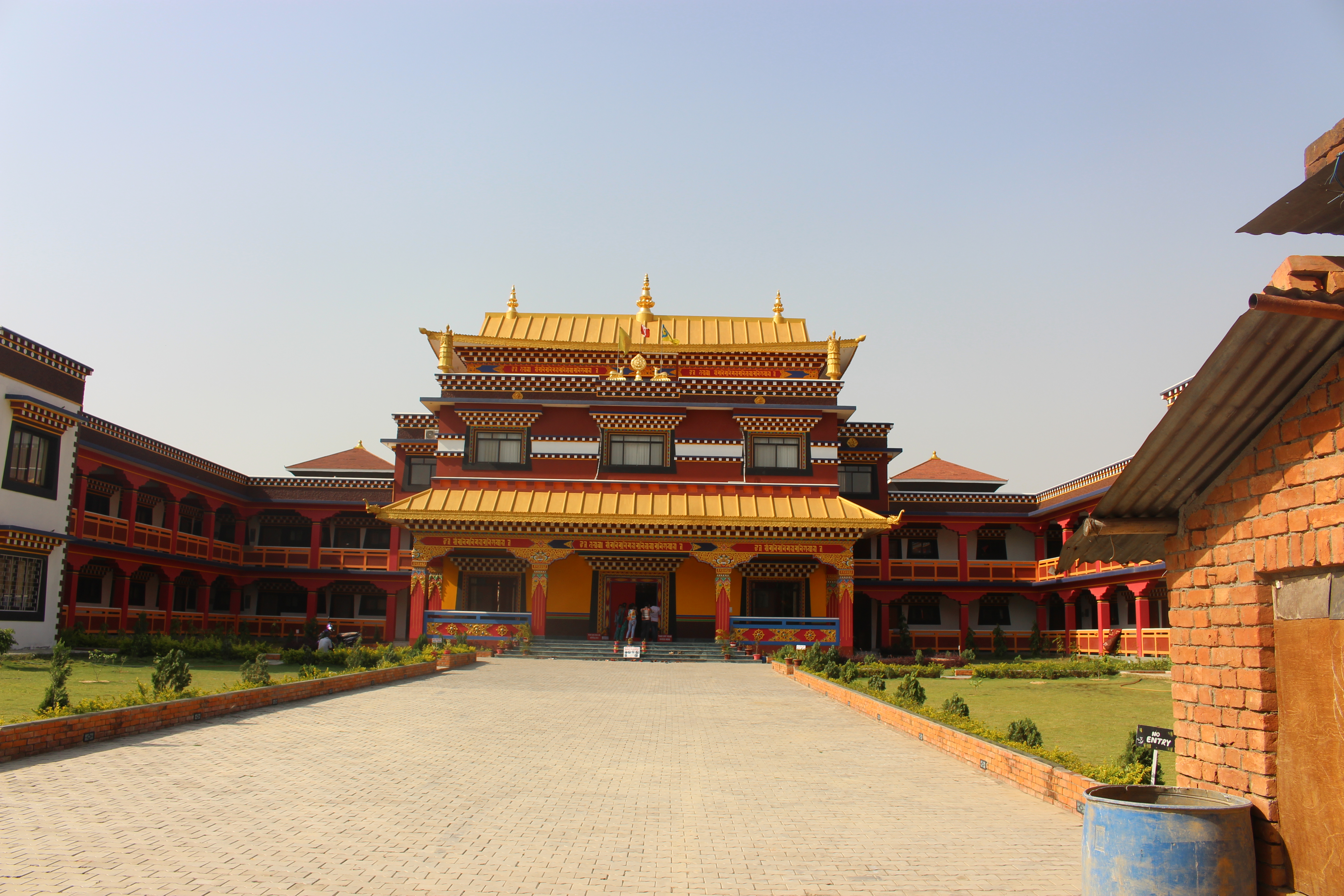
Canadian Buddhist Temple in Lumbini, Nepal

== See also ==
- Foreign relations of Canada
- Foreign relations of Nepal
- Nepalese Canadians
