= Consulate General of Nepal, Guangzhou =

Diplomatic Mission of Nepal in Guangzhou, China

- नेपाली महावाणिज्यदूतावास, ग्वाङझाउ
- Location: Guangzhou, China
- Address: Hua Xia Road No. 16, Fuli Yingkai Square Building 28th floor Room No. 03, Zhujiang New Town, Guangzhou
- Coordinates: 23°07′09.2″N 113°19′17.1″E
- Jurisdiction: China (Guangdong Province; Fujian Province; Hainan Province; Guangxi Zhuang Autonomous Region)
- Consul General: Bharat Khanal
- Website: Official website

The Consulate General of Nepal, Chengdu (Nepali: नेपाली महावाणिज्यदूतावास, ग्वाङझाउ; Chinese: 尼泊尔驻广州总领事馆) is the consular representation of the Federal Democratic Republic of Nepal to the People's Republic of China in Guangzhou. Its jurisdiction covers Guangdong Province, Fujian Province, Hainan Province and Guangxi Zhuang Autonomous Region. It is located in Hua Xia Road No. 16, Fuli Yingkai Square Building 28th floor Room No. 03, Zhujiang New Town, Guangzhou, Guangdong, China.

The consulate focuses primarily on enhancing economic cooperation, bilateral trade, tourism, and diplomatic connections between Nepal and the regions of China under its jurisdiction. It reports to the Embassy of Nepal, Beijing.

== History ==
The Consulate General of Nepal in Guangzhou was officially established and began its operations on September 10, 2017. As China, especially Guangdong Province evolved into a global commercial and manufacturing hub, the Government of Nepal felt the necessity to establish a consular footprint in the region.

== Functions ==
The office works to streamline administrative tasks for the regions under its jurisdiction providing consular services, promoting connectivity and aviation, facilitating trade and tourism between Nepal and regions of China under its jurisdiction.

== See also ==
- Embassy of Nepal, Beijing
- List of diplomatic missions of Nepal
- List of diplomatic missions in China
- China-Nepal relations
