= Consulate General of Nepal, Kolkata =

Diplomatic Mission of Nepal in Kolkata, India

- नेपाली महावाणिज्यदूतावास, कोलकाता
- Location: Kolkata, India
- Address: 1, National Library Ave, Alipore, Kolkata, West Bengal 700027, India
- Coordinates: 22°32′00″N 88°20′00″E
- Jurisdiction: India (West Bengal)
- Consul General: Jhakka Prasad Acharya
- Website: Official website

The Consulate General of Nepal in Kolkata (Nepali: नेपाली महावाणिज्यदूतावास, कोलकाता; Bengali: নেপালের কনস্যুলেট জেনারেল, কলকাতা) is the consular mission of the Federal Democratic Republic of Nepal in Kolkata, Republic of India. It is located at 1, National Library Avenue, Alipore, Kolkata, West Bengal 700027, India.

The consulate focuses primarily on enhancing economic cooperation, bilateral trade, tourism, and diplomatic connections between Nepal and the Indian state of West Bengal. It reports to the Embassy of Nepal in New Delhi.

== History ==
The Consulate General of Nepal in Kolkata is one of Nepal's oldest diplomatic missions as its establishment dates back to British Raj, prior to India's independence. This mission plays a vital role in India-Nepal relations and facilitating trade of Nepal through Kolkata and Haldia ports.

== Functions and services ==
The principal functions of the Consulate include making trade easier through the Kolkata and Haldia ports, issuing passports to Nepali citizens, issuing No Objection Certificates (NOC) for Nepali citizens who want to work, study, or do business in India, legalizing official documents, helping in rescue of home Nepali citizens in distress, and granting visas to foreign travelers.

== See also ==
- List of diplomatic missions of Nepal
- List of diplomatic missions in India
- India-Nepal relations
