= List of diplomatic missions of Nepal =

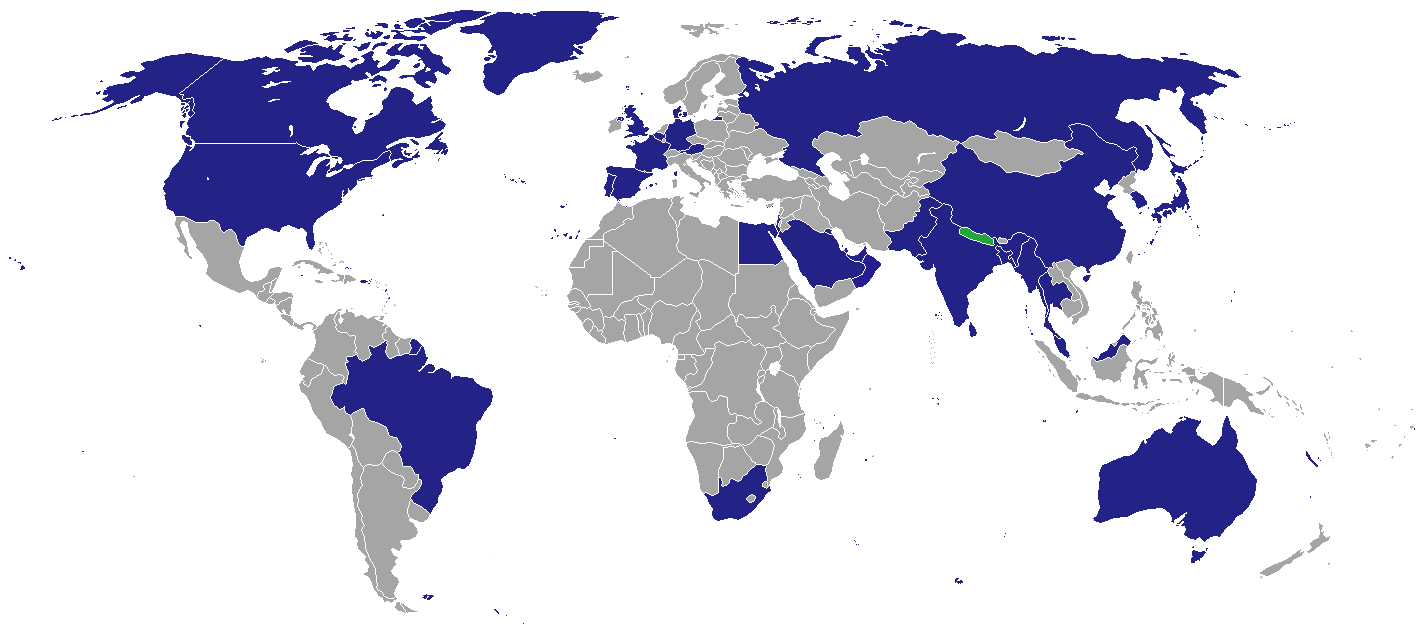
Location of diplomatic missions of Nepal: Nepal Embassy

This is a list of diplomatic missions of Nepal, excluding honorary consulates. Nepal's first semblance of a diplomatic network started in the reign of King Prithivi Narayan Shah, when in 1769 he established a foreign office called Jaishi Kotha. Over centuries the office slowly grew in stature until it became a government Department in 1934, although by the time of the revolution in 1950 Nepal only had diplomatic relations with India, Britain, France and the United States. The Nepalese Ministry of Foreign Affairs rapidly expanded in the 1950s and 1960s, driven by Nepal's precarious strategic position sandwiched between India and China.

As of 2025, Nepal's diplomatic network consists of 32 embassies, 9 consulates-general, and 2 permanent missions.

== Current missions ==
Host country	Host city	Mission	Concurrent accreditation		Ref.
Host country	Host city	Mission	Countries	International organisations	Ref.
Africa
Egypt	Cairo	Embassy	List: Algeria; Cameroon; Djibouti; Eritrea; Ethiopia; Gambia; Ghana; Guinea; Jordan; Lebanon; Libya; Mali; Mauritania; Morocco; Niger; Nigeria; Sierra Leone; Rwanda; South Sudan; Sudan; Syria; Togo; Tunisia; Uganda		
South Africa	Pretoria	Embassy	List: Angola; Benin; Botswana; Burkina Faso; Burundi; Cape Verde; Congo-Kinshasa; Equatorial Guinea; Eswatini; Gabon; Ivory Coast; Kenya; Lesotho; Liberia; Madagascar; Malawi; Mauritius; Mozambique; Seychelles; Tanzania; Zambia; Zimbabwe	List: United Nations Environment Programme	
Americas
Brazil	Brasília	Embassy	List: Barbados; Antigua and Barbuda; Argentina; Bolivia; Chile; Colombia; Dominica; Guyana; Paraguay; Peru; Saint Kitts and Nevis; Saint Lucia; Saint Vincent and the Grenadines; Suriname; Uruguay; Venezuela; Trinidad and Tobago		
Canada	Ottawa	Embassy	List: Cuba; Dominican Republic; Haiti; Jamaica	List: International Civil Aviation Organization	
United States	Washington, D.C.	Embassy	List: Bahamas; Belize; Costa Rica; El Salvador; Guatemala; Honduras; Mexico; Panama	List: World Bank Group	
United States	Dallas	Consulate General	List: Bahamas; Belize; Costa Rica; El Salvador; Guatemala; Honduras; Mexico; Panama	List: World Bank Group	
United States	New York City	Consulate General	List: Bahamas; Belize; Costa Rica; El Salvador; Guatemala; Honduras; Mexico; Panama	List: World Bank Group	
United States	San Francisco	Consulate General	List: Bahamas; Belize; Costa Rica; El Salvador; Guatemala; Honduras; Mexico; Panama	List: World Bank Group	
Asia
Bahrain	Manama	Embassy			
Bangladesh	Dhaka	Embassy		List: BIMSTEC	
China	Beijing	Embassy	List: Mongolia; North Korea	List: Asian Infrastructure Investment Bank; Shanghai Cooperation Organisation	
China	Chengdu	Consulate General	List: Mongolia; North Korea	List: Asian Infrastructure Investment Bank; Shanghai Cooperation Organisation	
China	Guangzhou	Consulate General	List: Mongolia; North Korea	List: Asian Infrastructure Investment Bank; Shanghai Cooperation Organisation	
China	Hong Kong	Consulate General	List: Mongolia; North Korea	List: Asian Infrastructure Investment Bank; Shanghai Cooperation Organisation	
China	Lhasa	Consulate General	List: Mongolia; North Korea	List: Asian Infrastructure Investment Bank; Shanghai Cooperation Organisation	
India	New Delhi	Embassy	List: Afghanistan; Bhutan		
India	Kolkata	Consulate General	List: Afghanistan; Bhutan		
Israel	Tel Aviv	Embassy	List: Cyprus		
Japan	Tokyo	Embassy		List: Asian Productivity Organization	
Kuwait	Kuwait City	Embassy	List: Iraq	List: Asia Cooperation Dialogue	
Malaysia	Kuala Lumpur	Embassy	List: Brunei; Indonesia; Philippines; Timor-Leste		
Myanmar	Yangon	Embassy			
Oman	Muscat	Embassy			
Pakistan	Islamabad	Embassy	List: Kyrgyzstan; Tajikistan; Turkey; Turkmenistan; Uzbekistan		
Qatar	Doha	Embassy	List: Iran		
Saudi Arabia	Riyadh	Embassy	List: Somalia; Yemen		
Saudi Arabia	Jeddah	Consulate General	List: Somalia; Yemen		
South Korea	Seoul	Embassy			
Sri Lanka	Colombo	Embassy	List: Maldives	List: Colombo Plan	
Thailand	Bangkok	Embassy	List: Cambodia; Laos; Singapore; Vietnam	List: UNESCAP	
United Arab Emirates	Abu Dhabi	Embassy		List: International Renewable Energy Agency	
United Arab Emirates	Dubai	Consulate General		List: International Renewable Energy Agency	
Europe
Austria	Vienna	Embassy	List: Albania; Bosnia and Herzegovina; Croatia; Georgia; Greece; Montenegro; North Macedonia; Slovenia	List: United Nations; Food and Agriculture Organization; International Atomic Energy Agency; International Fund for Agricultural Development; UNIDO; UNODC; World Food Programme	
Belgium	Brussels	Embassy	List: Luxembourg; Netherlands	List: European Union; Organisation for the Prohibition of Chemical Weapons; World Customs Organization	
Denmark	Copenhagen	Embassy	List: Estonia; Finland; Iceland; Latvia; Lithuania; Norway; Sweden		
France	Paris	Embassy	List: Andorra; Monaco	List: UNESCO	
Germany	Berlin	Embassy	List: Bulgaria; Czechia; Holy See; Hungary; Poland; Romania; Serbia; Slovakia; Ukraine	List: United Nations Framework Convention on Climate Change	
Portugal	Lisbon	Embassy			
Russia	Moscow	Embassy	List: Armenia; Azerbaijan; Belarus; Kazakhstan; Moldova		
Spain	Madrid	Embassy	List: Malta	List: UN Tourism	
United Kingdom	London	Embassy	List: Ireland	List: International Maritime Organization; International Coffee Organization	
Oceania
Australia	Canberra	Embassy	List: Fiji; Marshall Islands; Micronesia; New Zealand; Palau; Papua New Guinea; Samoa; Solomon Islands; Tonga; Tuvalu; Vanuatu		
Multilateral organisations
United Nations
Austria	Vienna	Permanent Mission		List: Food and Agriculture Organization; International Atomic Energy Agency; International Fund for Agricultural Development; UNIDO; UNODC; World Food Programme	
Switzerland	Geneva	Permanent Mission	List: Switzerland	List: World Health Organization; World Trade Organization	
United States	New York City	Permanent Mission	List: Ecuador; Nicaragua		

== Gallery ==
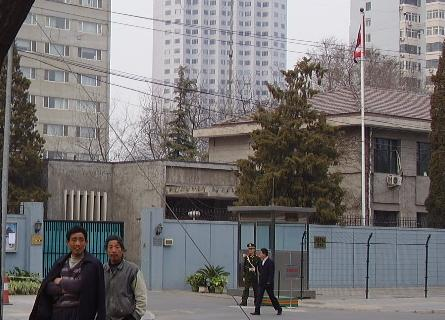
Embassy in Beijing

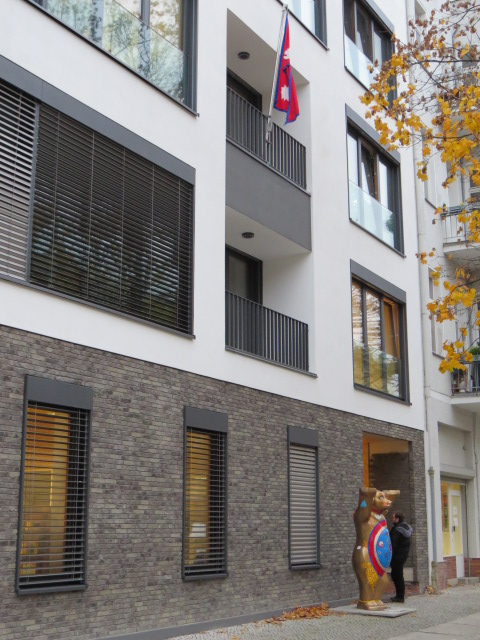
Embassy in Berlin

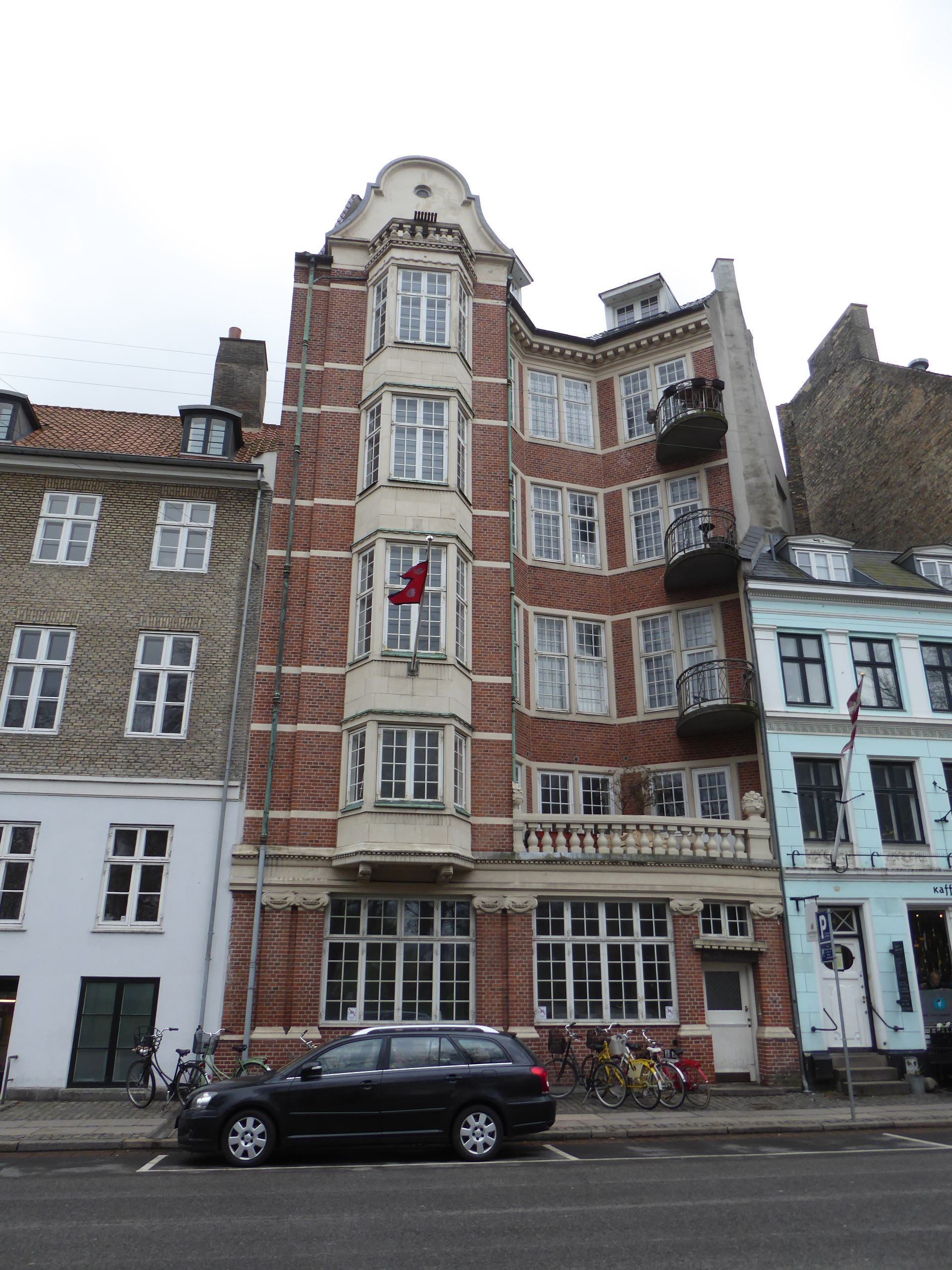
Embassy in Copenhagen

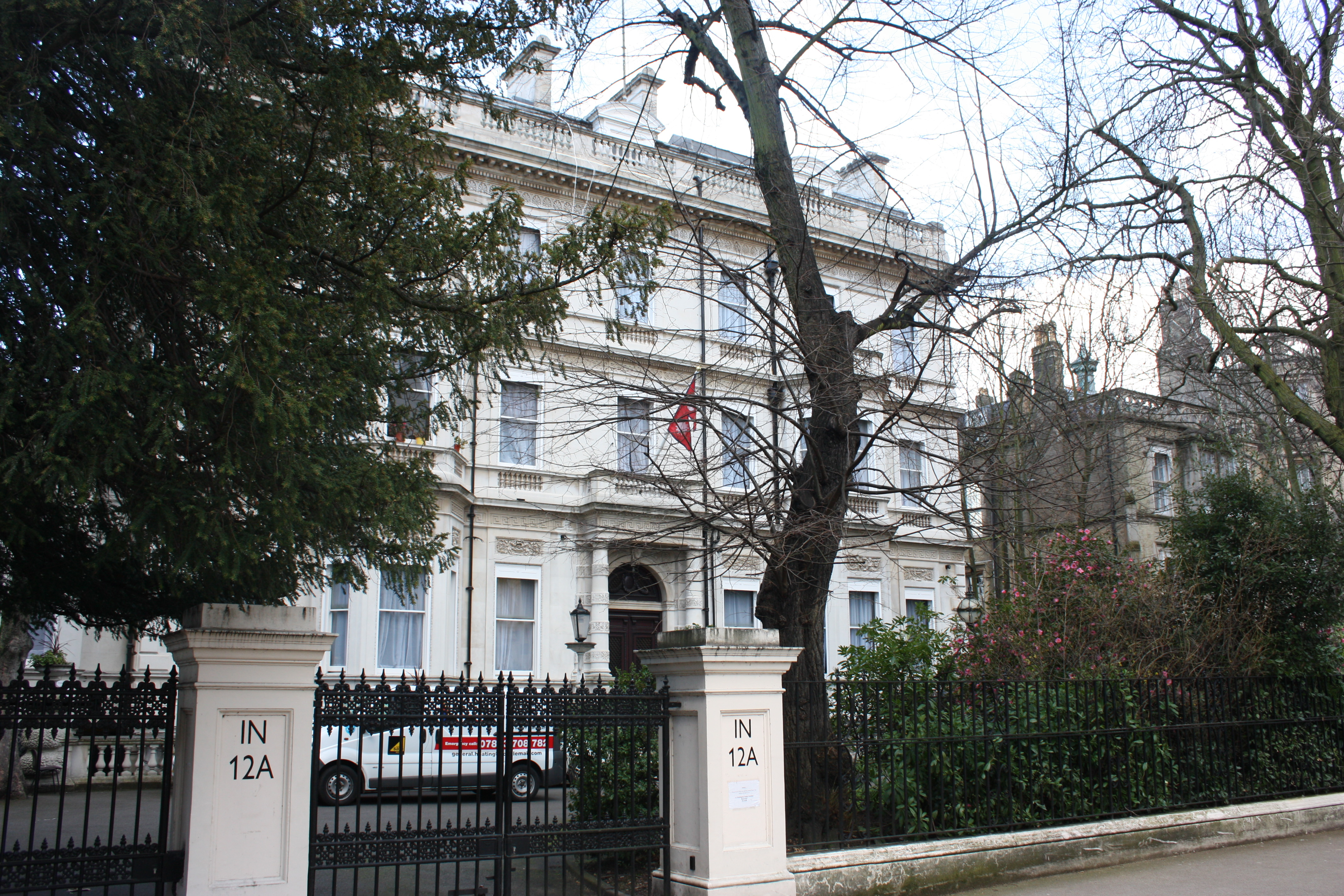
Embassy in London

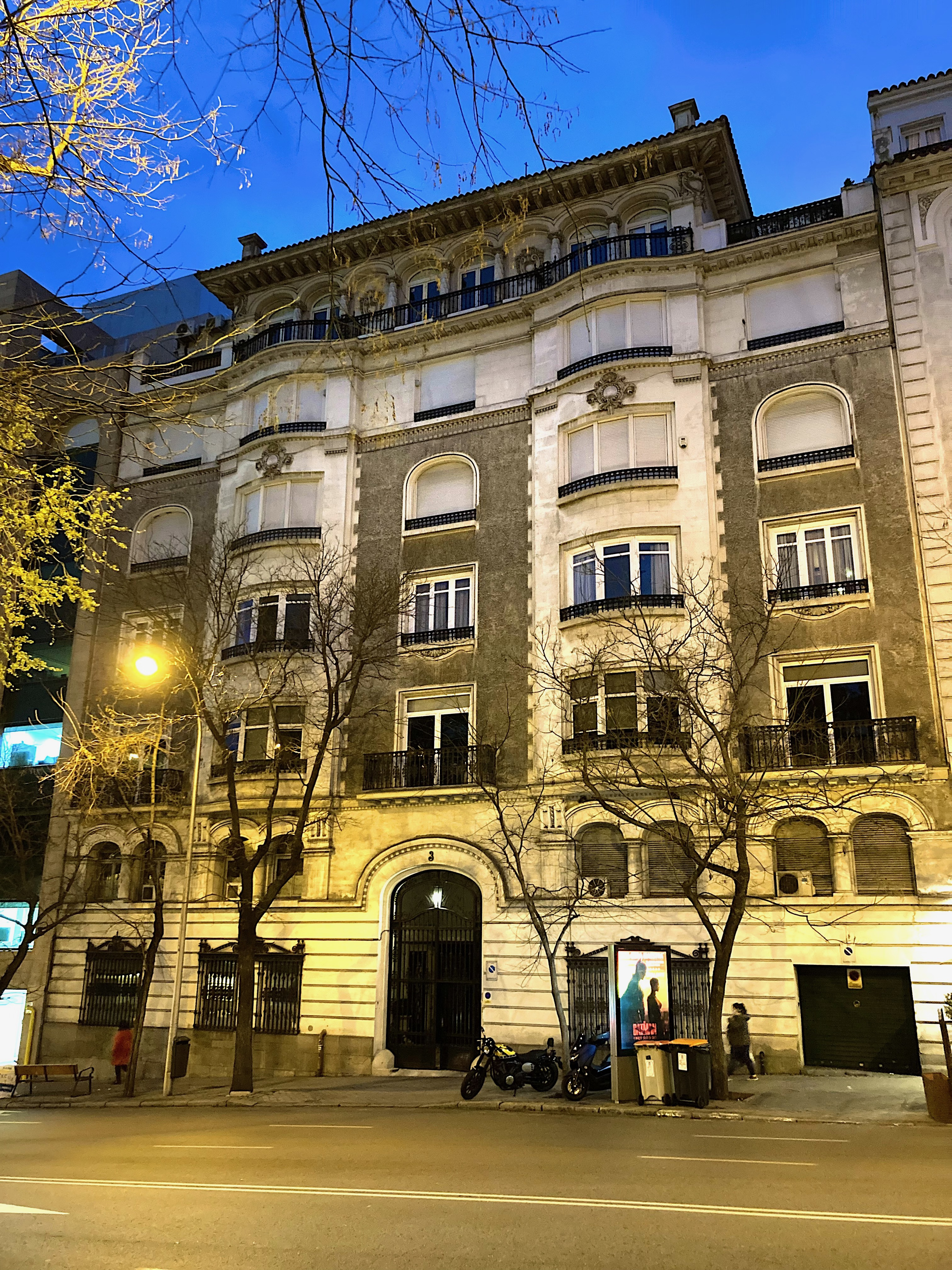
Embassy in Madrid

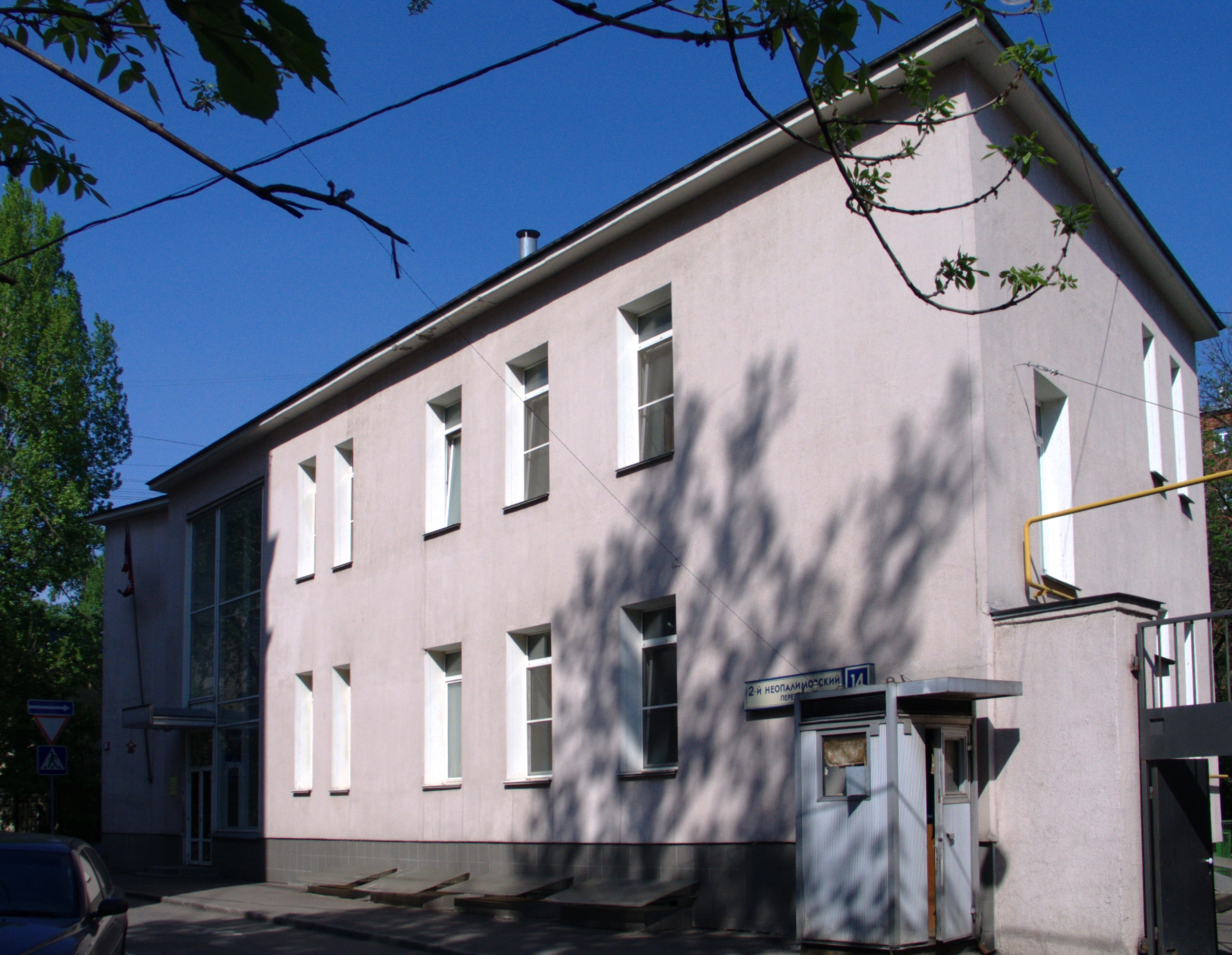
Embassy in Moscow

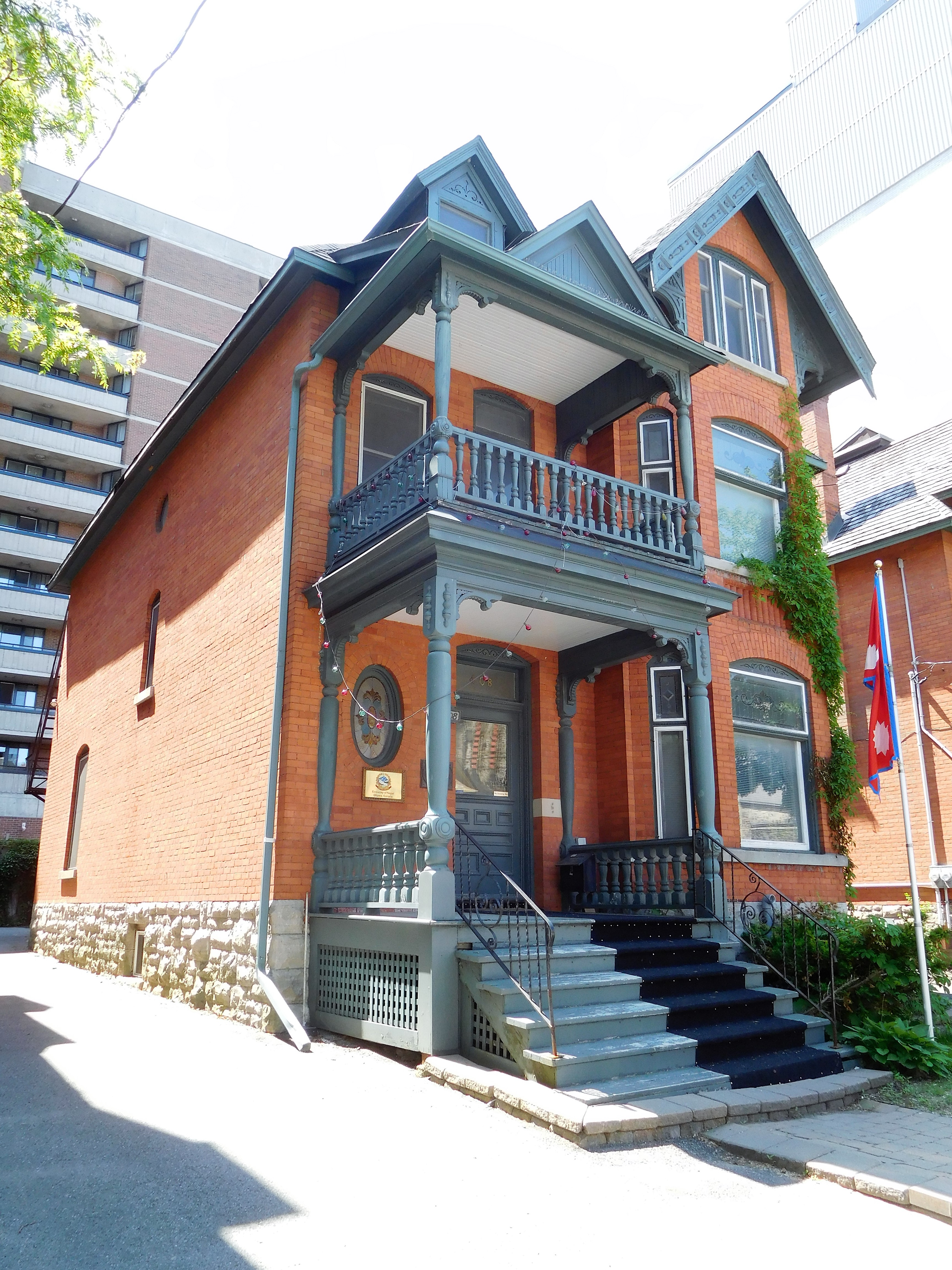
Embassy in Ottawa

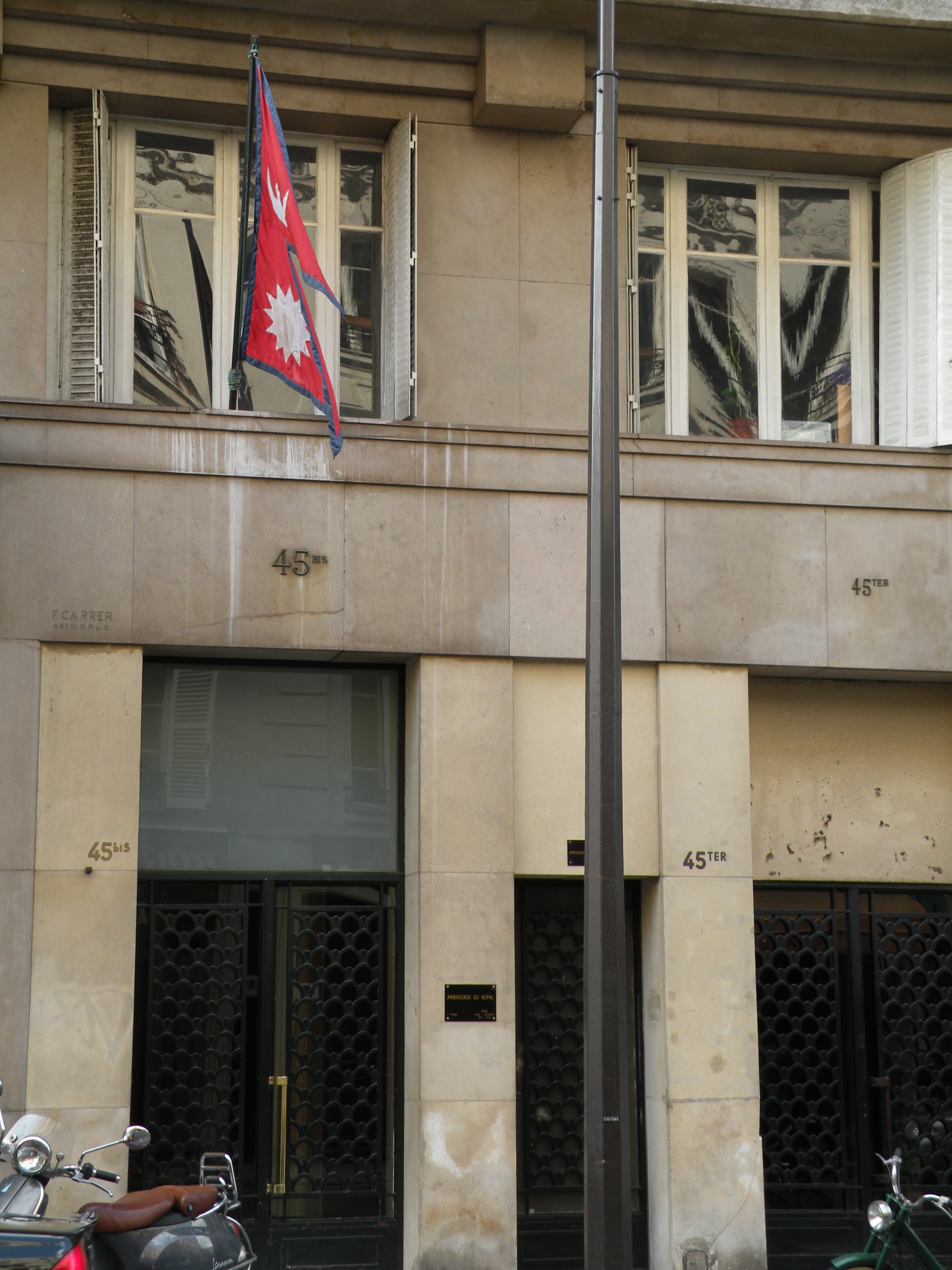
Embassy in Paris

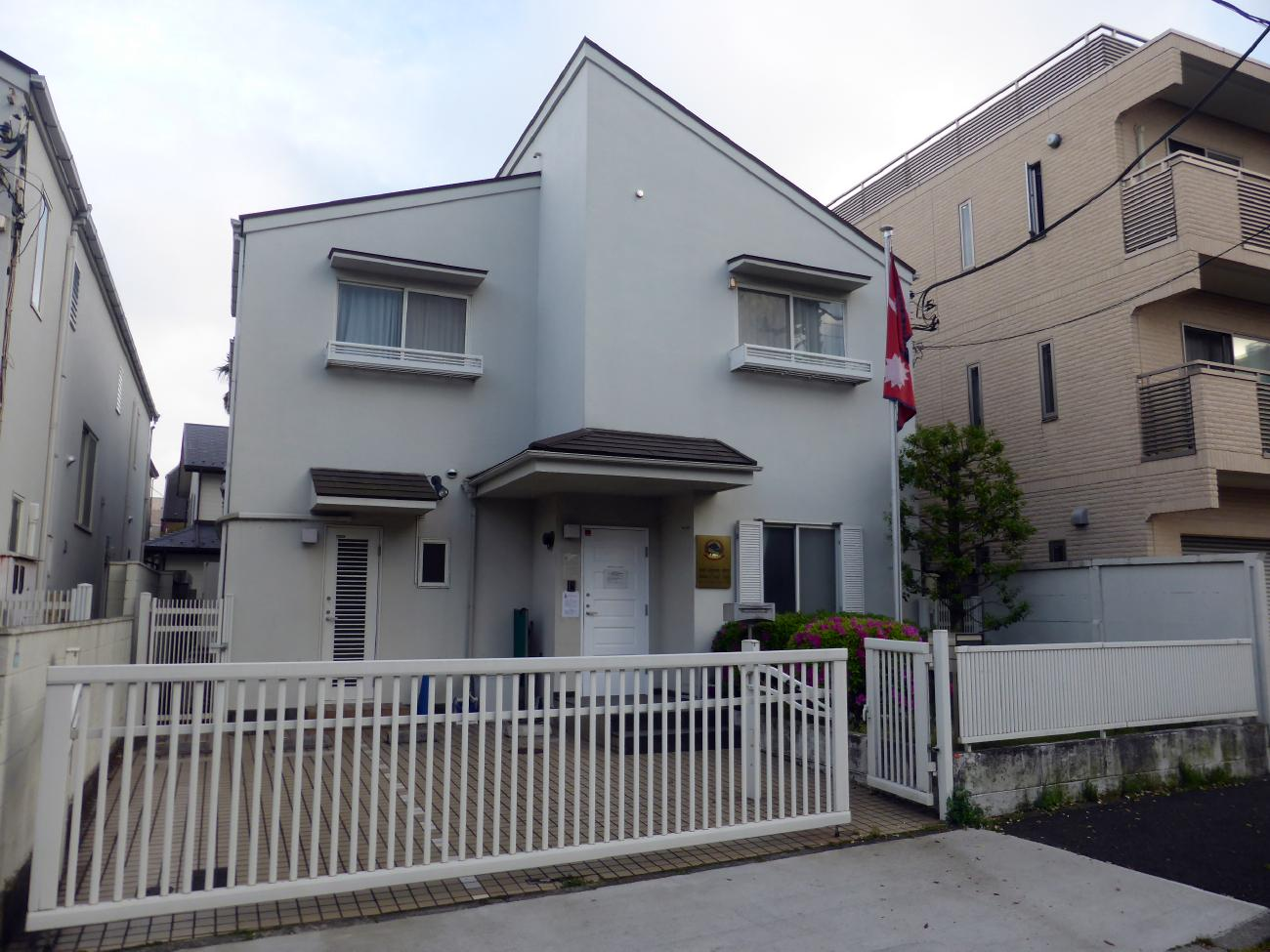
Embassy in Tokyo

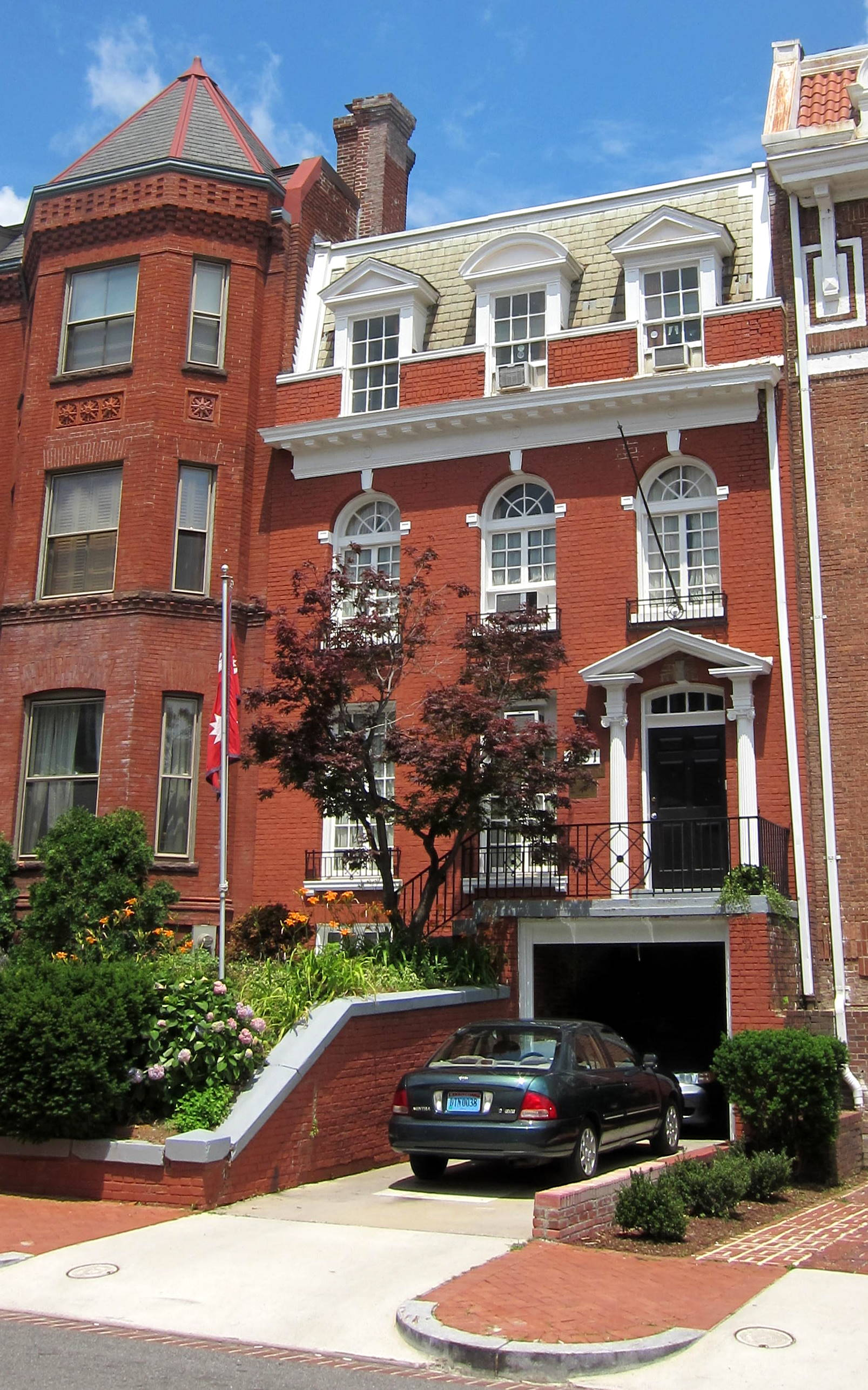
Embassy in Washington, D.C.

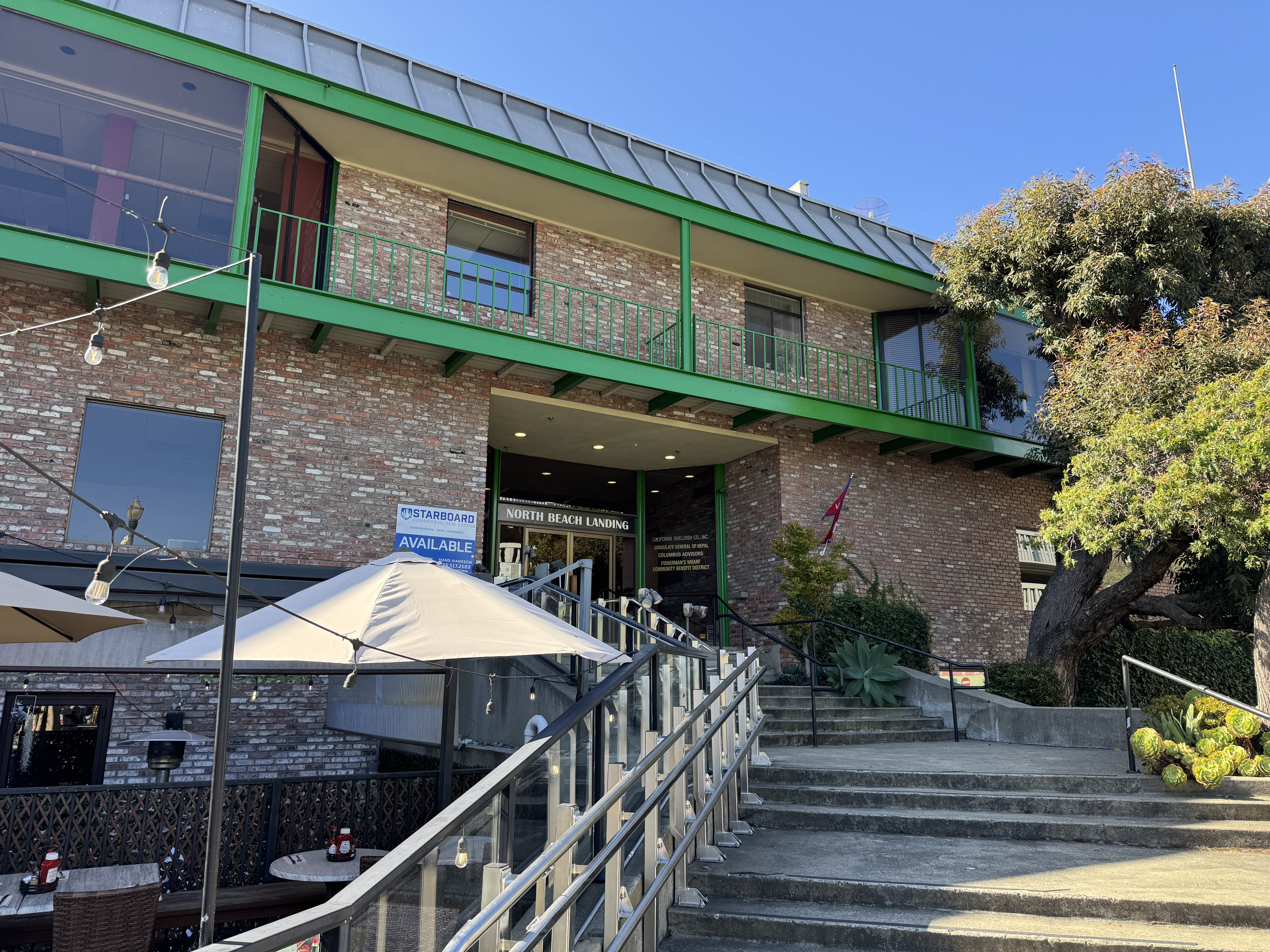
Consulate-General in San Francisco

== Closed missions ==
=== Europe ===
Host country	Host city	Mission	Year closed	Ref.
Italy	Rome	Embassy (Note: United Nations resident in Geneva, Switzerland)	1967	

== See also ==
- Foreign relations of Nepal
- Ministry of Foreign Affairs (Nepal)
- List of diplomatic missions in Nepal
