= Embassy of Nepal, New Delhi =

Diplomatic Mission of Nepal in India

- नेपाली राजदूतावास, नयाँ दिल्ली
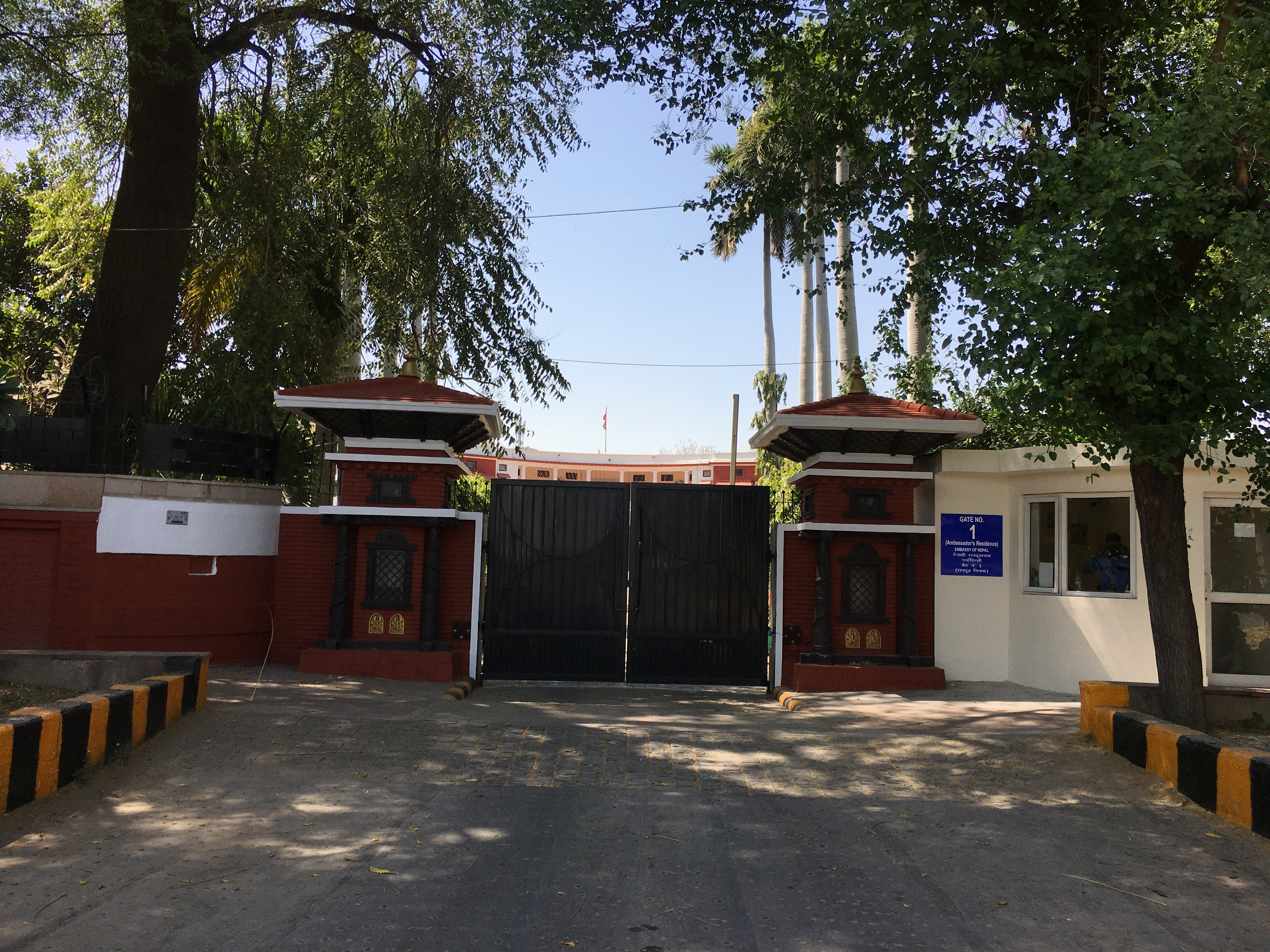
- Location: New Delhi, India
- Address: 1, Barakhamba Rd, Vakil Lane, Mandi House, New Delhi, Delhi 110001, India
- Coordinates: 28°37′33″N 77°13′49″E
- Jurisdiction: India
- Chargé d'affaires: Deepak Ghimire (interim)
- Website: Official website

The Embassy of Nepal in New Delhi (Nepali: नेपाली राजदूतावास, नयाँ दिल्ली; Hindi: नेपाली दूतावास, नई दिल्ली) is the diplomatic mission of the Federal Democratic Republic of Nepal to the Republic of India. It is located at Barakhamba Rd, Vakil Lane, Mandi House, New Delhi, Delhi 110001, India.

The embassy is a cornerstone in deepening the India-Nepal relations and is responsible for overseeing geopolitical dialogues, infrastructure partnerships, bilateral trade initiatives and consular services across India.

== History ==
Diplomatic missions between Nepal and India were established on 13 June 1947, shortly before independence of India from British Raj. Prior to the establishment of Embassy in New Delhi, the Kingdom of Nepal maintained a legation and consulate general during the British Raj. The legation was upgraded to a full embassy in 1957.

== Concurrent Accreditations ==
The Ambassador Extraordinary and Plenipotentiary of Nepal to India is concurrently accredited to the following:

=== Countries ===
- Afghanistan
- Bhutan

== Functions and Services ==
The embassy is responsible for coordinating high-level state visits, handle strategic cooperation between the two governments, administer comprehensive passport and visa operations, support the Nepali diaspora population across India and promote trade and tourism between the two nations.

== Consular Jurisdiction ==
The Embassy of Nepal in New Delhi holds general diplomatic jurisdiction over the entirety of the Republic of India. However, for administrative efficiency, such as issuing visas, renewing passports, and providing citizen services, the consular responsibilities are divided between the embassy in New Delhi and the Consulate General in Kolkata.

== See also ==
- List of diplomatic missions of Nepal
- List of diplomatic missions in India
- India-Nepal relations
