= Nepalese Canadians =

Community of Canadians of Nepalese descent or with Nepalese citizenship

Total population
- 21,975 (by ancestry, 2021 Census)

Regions with significant populations
- Ontario: 11,585 (52.7%)
- Alberta: 5,140 (23.4%)
- British Columbia: 2,305 (10.5%)
- Quebec: 980 (4.5%)
- Manitoba: 805 (3.7%)

Languages
- English • French • Nepali

Religion
- Hinduism · Buddhism

Related ethnic groups
- Nepali people · Nepalese Americans

Nepalese Canadians or Nepali Canadians are Canadians with roots in Nepal.

== Migration history ==
Nepalese are recent immigrants in Canada and their numbers are relatively small. According to the 1991 report on immigration and citizenship, only 125 people indicated Nepal as their country of birth. Aside from immigrants from Nepal itself, there are also Nepali-speaking people from neighboring countries such as India, Burma and Bhutan as well as Nepal who lived in other countries (Fiji, Hong Kong, the United Kingdom and the United States) before immigrating to Canada.

The majority of Nepal in Canada migrated in pursuit of better economic opportunities and professional fulfillment. Some who had experienced discrimination in the countries they left were also attracted by the possibility of enjoying political and religious freedom in Canada. A small number of Nepalis arrived during the 1960s and early 1970s. From the late 1970s to the present there has been a relative increase in their number. Some Nepalis arrived in Canada as independent professionals and members of various occupational groups, while others were able to enter through family affiliations and personal contacts. A small group of Nepalis came through the Gurkha Welfare Appeal (Canada), which was established by Canadian military veterans after World War II.

Nepal have settled primarily in the urban areas of Canada. Almost half of them are located in Ontario, and the second-largest settlement is in British Columbia. In 2013 and 2014, more than two thousand Nepal settled in Alberta. Only a handful are spread throughout the rest of Canada. Immigration overview of permanent residents in Canada (Canada Government) has published that between 2004 and 2013, 8218 people with Nepal as source country became permanent residents of Canada. There are also a number of Canadian parents seeking to adopt children from Nepal, although recently Canadian authorities have suspended adoptions from Nepal. The Canadian government has opened a permanent residency program for professionals like doctors, engineers, nurse, professors, and accountants from Nepal. Nepali foreign employment agencies have promoted Nepal's workforce and seek openings in Canada so Nepal workers can be hired through personal contacts in various sectors.

== Current status ==
The Nepalis who have immigrated to Canada are largely a well-educated group, and some have advanced university degrees. Members of the Nepal community in Canada occupy positions as professors, bankers, foresters, accountants, doctors, engineers, architects, computer professionals, agriculturalists, and researchers. Some have private practices in medicine, pharmacy, and accounting, or are self-employed in various fields such as real estate and the hospitality and service sectors. While there are Nepal Canadians working in restaurants and factories, others have high-level positions as senior executives in corporations and partners in national firms. Nepali immigrants are also beginning to establish small businesses, such as restaurants, specialty stores and quick-marts.

Many Nepal Canadians participate in mainstream-Canadian political, professional, religious, and charitable organizations. Because of their small numbers, however, their influence on Canadian regional and national politics is as yet only marginal.

== Demography ==
Nepalese Canadian demography by religion
Religious group	2021 (Note: Religious breakdown proportions based on "Nepali" ethnic or cultural origin response on the 2021 census.)	
Religious group	Pop.	%
Hinduism	16,245	73.92%
Buddhism	2,140	9.74%
Irreligion	1,760	8.01%
Christianity	1,450	6.6%
Islam	160	0.73%
Sikhism	70	0.32%
Judaism	0	0%
Indigenous spirituality	0	0%
Other	150	0.68%
Total Nepalese Canadian population	21,975	100%

== Notable people ==
- Naresh Budhayer, cricketer
- Sudarshan Gautam, mountaineer and actor
- Bhutila Karpoche, Ontario Member of Provincial Parliament for Parkdale—High Park (2018–2025)
- Drona Prakash Rasali, veterinarian
- Shriya Shah-Klorfine, climber who died on Mount Everest
- Manjushree Thapa, writer
- Curtis Waters, singer

== See also ==
- Canada–Nepal relations
- Nepalese diaspora
- Immigration to Canada
