= Consulate General of Nepal, Lhasa =

- नेपाली महावाणिज्यदूतावास, ल्हासा
- Location: Lhasa, Tibet Autonomous Region, China
- Address: No. 13, Norbulingka Road, Lhasa
- Coordinates: 29°39′N 91°05′E
- Jurisdiction: China (Tibet Autonomous Region)
- Consul General: Laxmi Prasad Niraula
- Website: Official website

Consulate General of Nepal, Lhasa (Nepali: नेपाली महावाणिज्यदूतावास, ल्हासा; Chinese: 尼泊尔驻拉萨总领事馆) is the consular mission of the Federal Democratic Republic of Nepal in Lhasa, Tibet Autonomous Region of the People's Republic of China. It is also the only foreign consular office in the Tibet Autonomous Region.

== History ==
On May 11, 1958, the Consulate General of Nepal in Lhasa was opened and on September 27, 2019, the new Consulate General was completed. The embassy is located at No. 13, Norbulingka Road, Lhasa. The officials of the Consulate General are the Consul General, the Consul, and the Consular Attaché. Citizens from all provinces and regions of China can apply for entry visas for Nepal at the Consulate General of Nepal in Lhasa. Tibet Autonomous Region funded remodeling of premises for Nepal's Consulate General in 2019.

== See also ==
- List of diplomatic missions of Nepal
