= Egypt–Nepal relations =

- Egypt: Nepal

Egypt–Nepal relations refers to the bilateral relations between Egypt and Nepal. Nepal has an embassy in Cairo and Egypt has an embassy in Kathmandu.

Egypt–Nepal relations were officially established on 16 July 1957.
