= Embassy of Nepal, Washington, D.C. =

Nepali diplomatic mission in the United States

Embassy of Nepal, Washington D.C.
- नेपाली राजदूतावास, वाशिंगटन डी.सी.
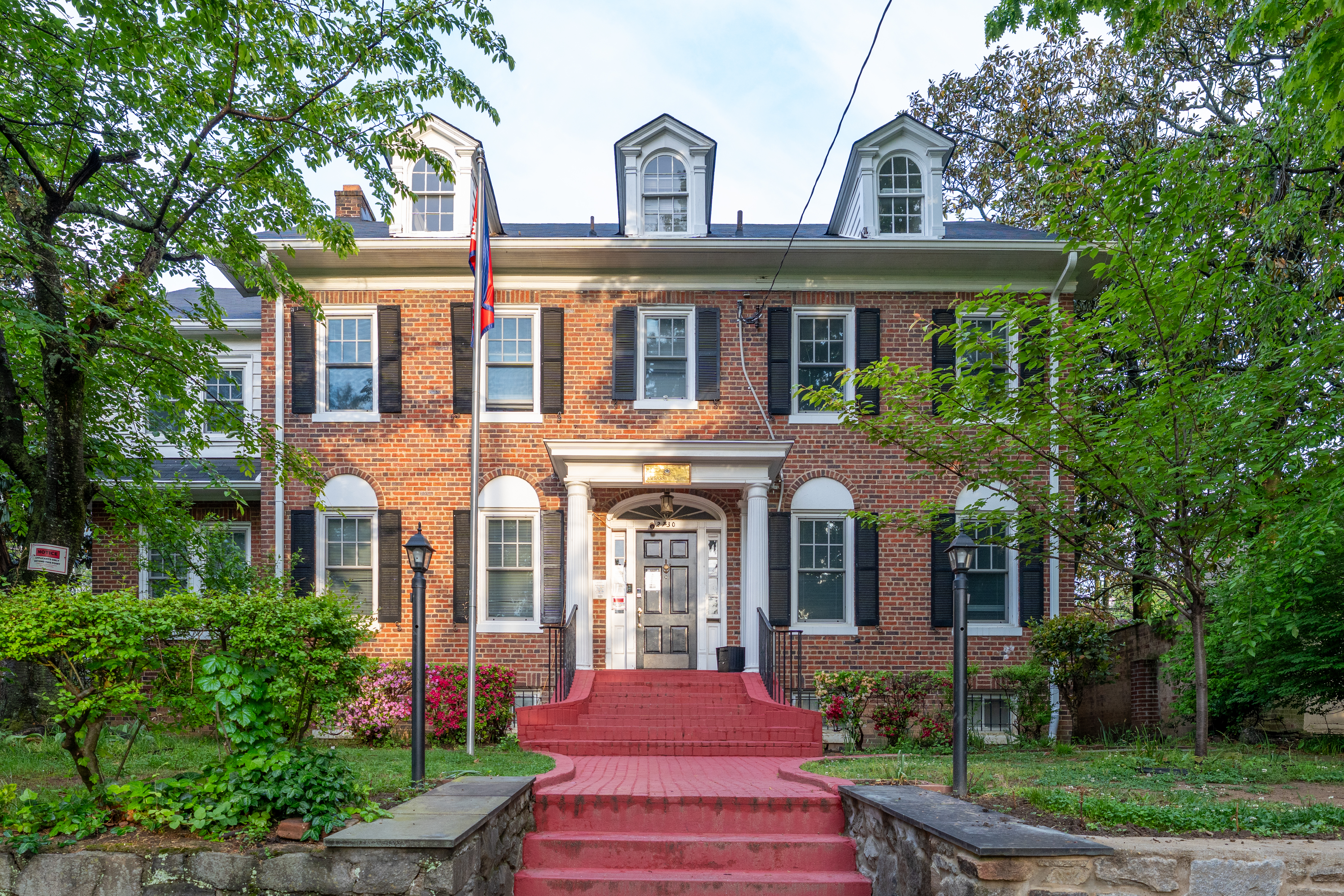
- Location: Washington, D.C., US
- Address: 2730 34th Place NW, N.W.
- Coordinates: 38°55′32.3″N 77°04′03.5″W
- Ambassador: Lok Darshan Regmi
- Jurisdiction: United States
- Website: Official website

The Embassy of Nepal in Washington, D.C. is the diplomatic mission of the Federal Democratic Republic of Nepal to the United States of America. It is located at 2730 34th Place NW Washington, D.C., in the Glover Park neighborhood..

== History ==
Nepal and the United States of America established formal diplomatic relations on 25 April 1947. In order to deepen Nepal-United States relations, Nepal established its residential embassy in Washington D.C. in February 1958 and US followed the move by establishing its own residential embassy in August 1959.

== Concurrent accreditations ==
The ambassador of Nepal to the United States is concurrently accredited to the following:

=== Countries ===
- Bahamas
- Belize
- Costa Rica
- El Salvador
- Guatemala
- Honduras
- Mexico
- Panama

=== International organisation ===
- World Bank Group

== Functions and services ==
The embassy is responsible for overseeing Nepal's diplomatic interests in the United States and the accredited countries and organisations. The core functions of the embassy includes consular services, diaspora support and trade and tourism promotion.

== See also ==
- List of diplomatic missions of Nepal
- List of diplomatic missions in the United States
- Nepal-United States relations
