= Nepal–United States relations =

- Nepal: United States

Diplomatic mission
- Embassy of Nepal, Washington D.C: Embassy of the United States, Kathmandu

The United States established official relations with Nepal in 1947 and opened its Kathmandu embassy in 1959. Relations between the two countries have always been friendly. U.S. policy objectives toward Nepal center on helping Nepal build a "peaceful, prosperous, and democratic society."

According to the 2012 U.S. Global Leadership Report, 41% of Nepalese people approve of U.S. leadership, with 12% disapproving and 47% uncertain. As of 2012, Nepalese students form the 11th largest group of international students studying in the United States, representing 1.3% of all foreigners pursuing higher education in America.

== History ==
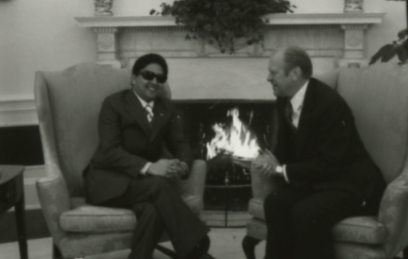
Gerald Ford with then-Prince Gyanendra of Nepal on December 10, 1976.

Since 1951, the United States has provided more than $791 million in bilateral economic assistance to Nepal. In recent years, annual bilateral U.S. economic assistance through the U.S. Agency for International Development (USAID) has averaged $40 million. USAID supports agriculture, health, family planning, environmental protection, democratization, governance, and hydropower development efforts in Nepal. USAID had also supported Nepal's peace process, as well as its preparation for Constituent Assembly elections. The United States also contributes to international institutions and private voluntary organizations working in Nepal. To date, U.S. contributions to multilateral organizations working in Nepal approach an additional $725 million, including humanitarian assistance. The Peace Corps temporarily suspended its operations in Nepal in 2004 due to increasing security concerns and officially terminated its Nepal program in 2006.

In 2017, the United States, through the Millennium Challenge Corporation, and Nepal signed the Nepal Compact, a US$500,000,000 grant to Nepal.

Ambassador Randy W. Berry was appointed to Nepal on October 25, 2018. He replaces Alaina B. Teplitz, who is now the United States Ambassador to Sri Lanka and the Maldives.

In 2025, President Donald Trump issued an executive order pausing all foreign development aid for 90 days to assess efficiency and alignment with U.S. foreign policy. One month later Nepal's Finance Ministry confirmed that U.S.-funded projects, including a $500 million Millennium Challenge Corporation grant for power transmission and road improvements, have been suspended. The transmission line was designed to boost power trade with India.

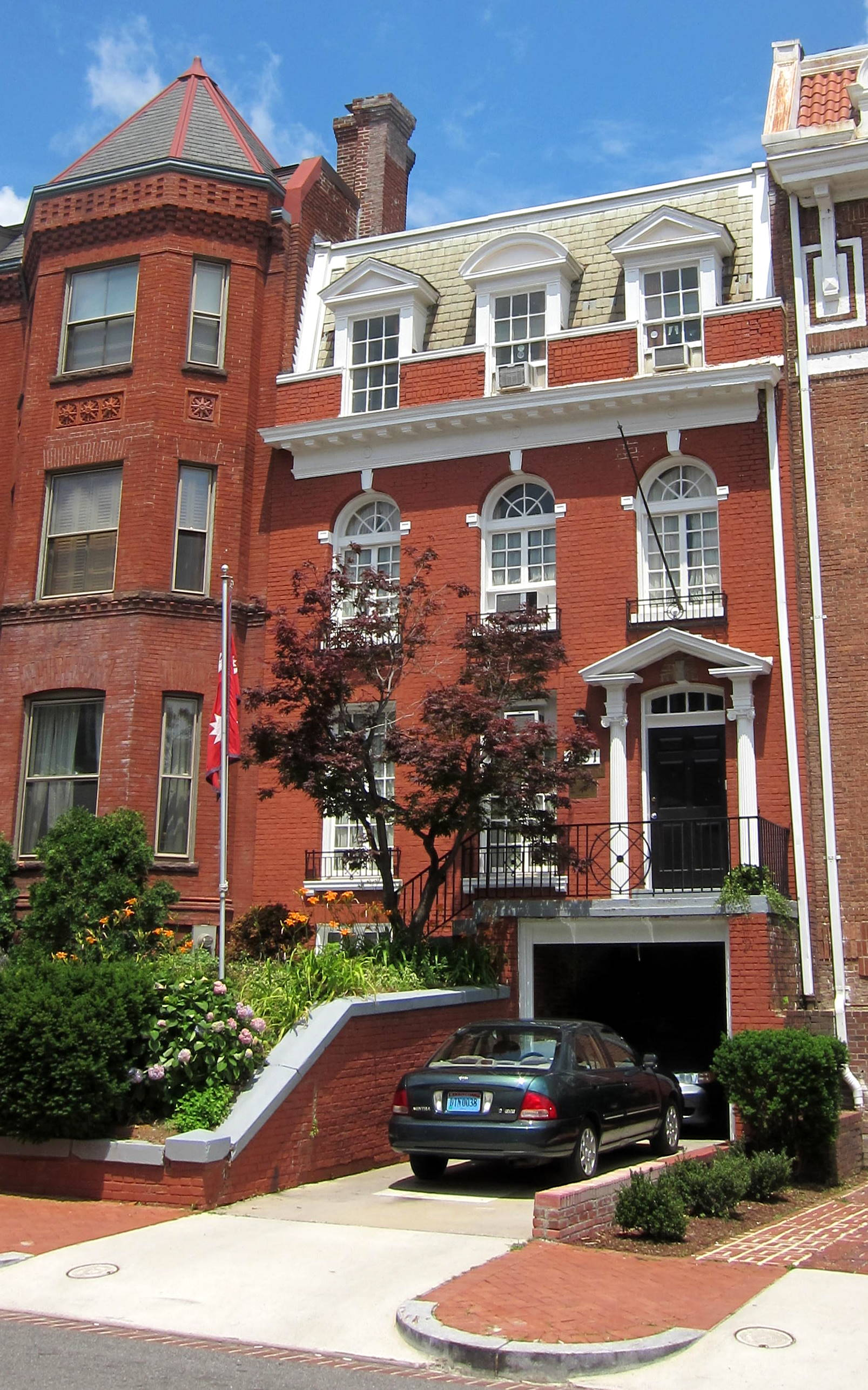
Embassy of Nepal in Washington, D.C.

== Resident diplomatic missions ==
- Nepal has an embassy in Washington, D.C. and has consulates-general in Dallas, New York City and San Francisco.
- United States has an embassy in Kathmandu.

== See also ==
- Foreign relations of Nepal
- Foreign relations of the United States
- Nepalese Americans
