= Foreign relations of Nepal =

Though the Ministry of Foreign Affairs (MOFA) is the government agency responsible for conducting the foreign relations of Nepal, historically, it has been the Office of the Prime Minister (PMO) that has exercised the authority to formulate the country's foreign policies. Nepal maintains a policy of non-alignment and pursues friendly relations with a wide range of countries. Due to its strategic location between two regional giants, China and India, Nepal’s foreign policy is largely centered on maintaining balanced and peaceful ties with both neighbors while safeguarding its sovereignty and independence. Nepal is a member of various international organizations, including the United Nations, the South Asian Association for Regional Cooperation SAARC, and the Bay of Bengal Initiative for Multi-Sectoral Technical and Economic Cooperation BIMSTEC. The country actively participates in regional cooperation efforts and seeks to enhance economic, cultural, and diplomatic exchanges with countries worldwide. Nepal’s foreign relations also emphasize development assistance, trade partnerships, and promoting peace and stability in South Asia.

== Overview ==
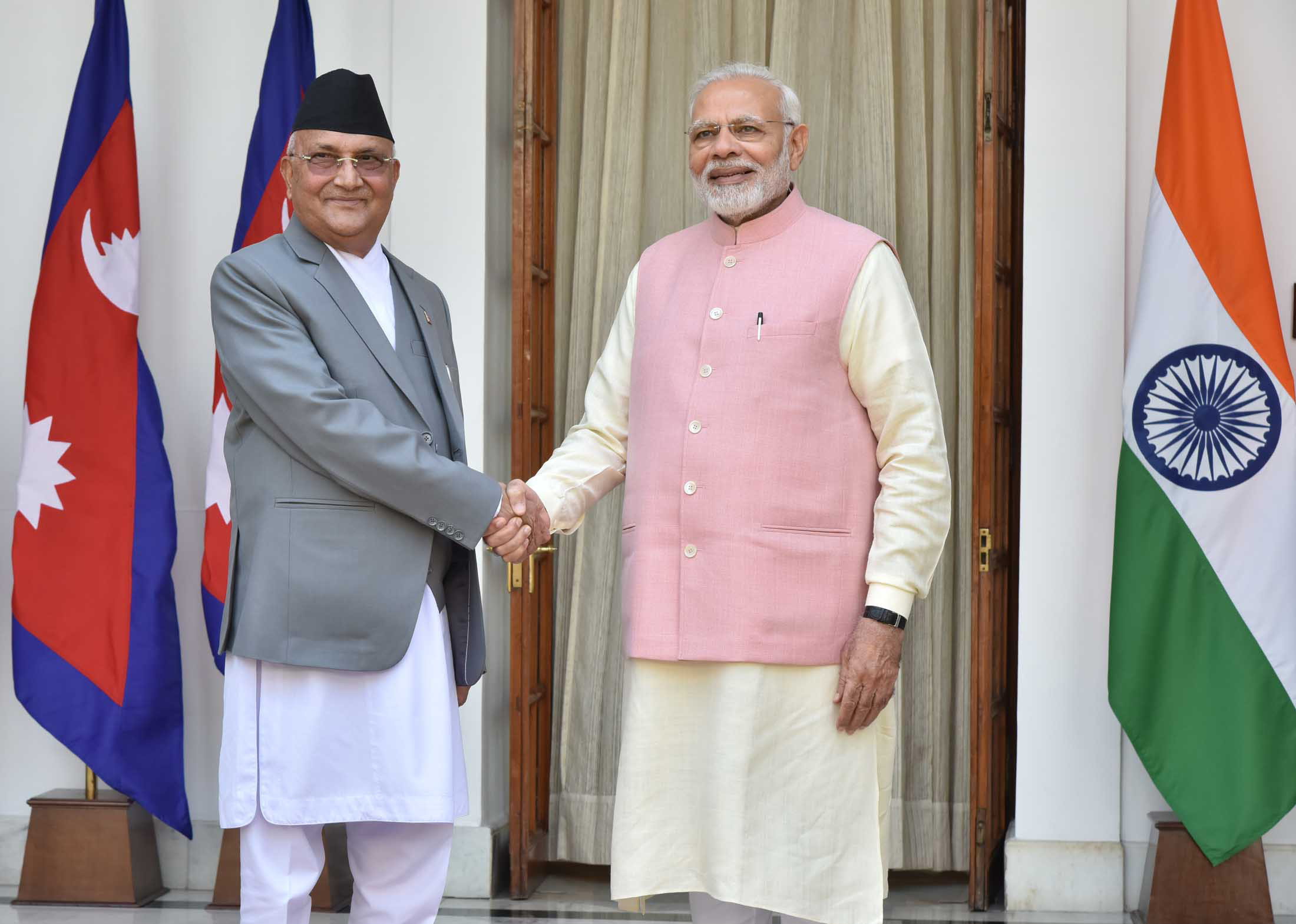
Nepalese Prime Minister K. P. Sharma Oli and Indian Prime Minister Narendra Modi in New Delhi, India, 7 April 2018

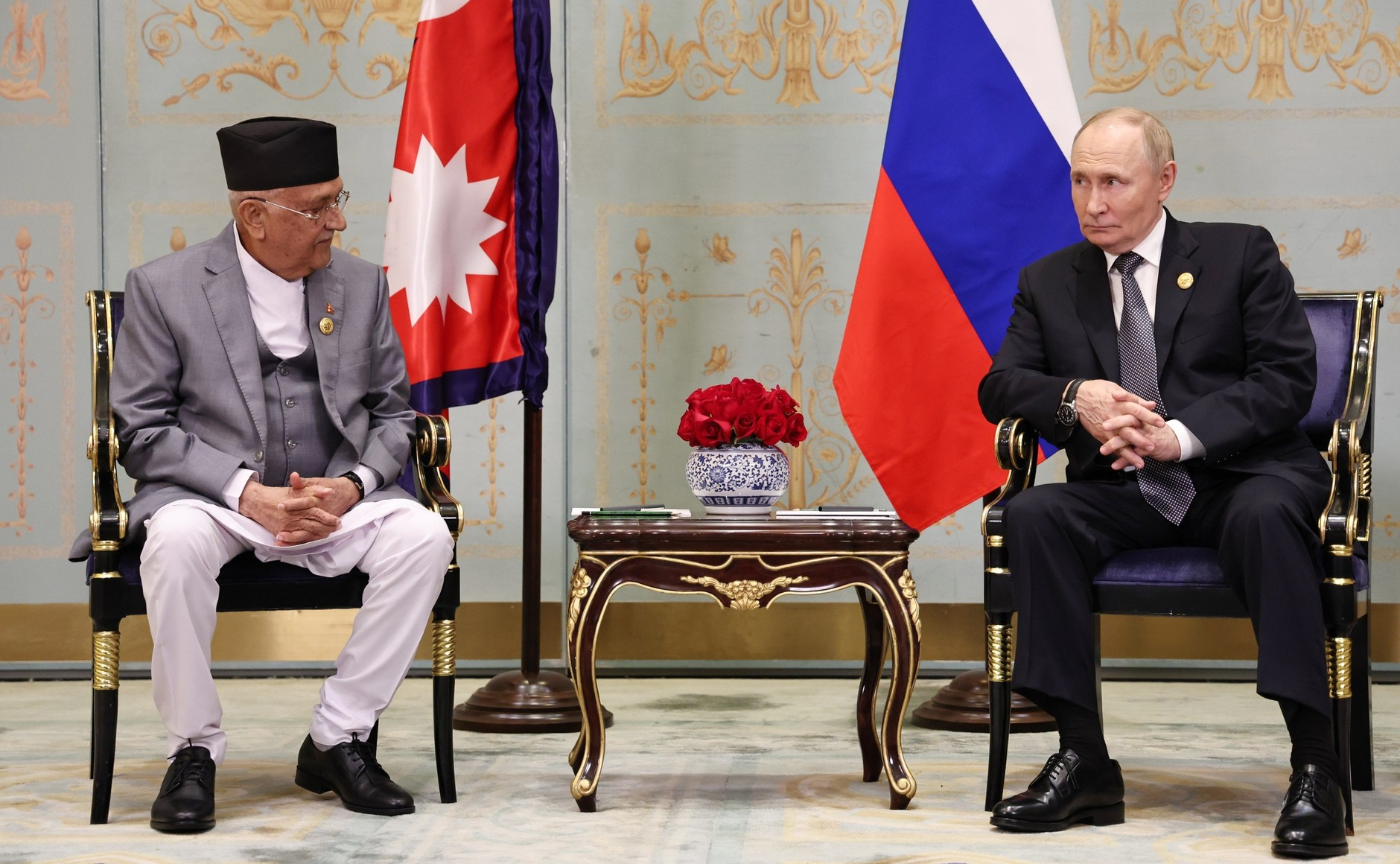
K.P. Sharma Oli and Russian President Vladimir Putin at the 2025 Tianjin SCO summit in China, 1 September 2025

Constitutionally, Nepal's foreign policy is to be guided by "the principles of the United Nations Charter, nonalignment, Panchsheel (five principles of peaceful coexistence), international law and the value of world peace."

Nepal's most substantive international relations are perhaps with international economic institutions such as the Asian Development Bank, the International Monetary Fund, the World Bank, and the South Asian Association for Regional Cooperation. Nepal also has strong bilateral relations with major providers of economic and military aid, such as France, Germany, Japan, South Korea, Switzerland, the United States, and particularly the United Kingdom, with whom military ties date back to the nineteenth century. The country's external relations are managed by the Ministry of Foreign Affairs and the Prime Minister's Office.

In its foreign policy, Nepal generally seeks to balance its relations with its large neighbors India and China in order to avoid dependency on either one. Nepal's relation with China has seen a major upswing in the recent years with China now becoming Nepal's top 5 aid donor to Nepal. In 2021, Indian government also announced increments of aid to Nepal by nearly 13% to $130 million, to counter China's growing footprint in Nepal. However, data on the actual disbursement of aid by the Indian government remains unclear.

== Diplomatic relations ==
List of countries which Nepal maintains diplomatic relations with:

#	Country	Date
1	United Kingdom	4 March 1816
2	United States	25 April 1947
3	India	13 June 1947
4	France	20 April 1949
5	China	1 August 1955
6	Russia	20 July 1956
7	Japan	1 September 1956
8	Switzerland	9 November 1956
9	Sri Lanka	1 July 1957
10	Egypt	16 July 1957
11	Germany	4 April 1958
12	Austria	15 August 1959
13	Italy	31 August 1959
14	Serbia	7 October 1959
15	Poland	25 November 1959
16	Thailand	30 November 1959
17	Czech Republic	26 December 1959
18	Malaysia	1 January 1960
19	Greece	2 February 1960
20	Philippines	12 February 1960
21	Australia	15 February 1960
22	Myanmar	19 March 1960
23	Pakistan	20 March 1960
24	Netherlands	2 April 1960
25	Laos	20 May 1960
26	Israel	1 June 1960
27	Sweden	10 June 1960
28	Indonesia	25 December 1960
29	Mongolia	5 January 1961
30	Hungary	15 January 1961
31	New Zealand	1 May 1961
32	Afghanistan	1 July 1961
33	Argentina	1 January 1962
34	Chile	1962
35	Turkey	15 November 1962
36	Lebanon	18 August 1963
37	Belgium	19 August 1963
38	Iran	14 December 1964
39	Canada	18 January 1965
40	Jordan	20 August 1965
41	Denmark	15 December 1967
42	Bulgaria	15 April 1968
43	Romania	20 April 1968
44	Algeria	29 April 1968
45	Spain	13 May 1968
46	Iraq	30 October 1968
47	Singapore	25 March 1969
48	Sudan	11 July 1969
49	Syria	26 February 1970
50	Ethiopia	15 April 1971
51	Kuwait	25 February 1972
52	Bangladesh	8 April 1972
53	Albania	23 May 1972
54	Norway	26 January 1973
55	North Korea	15 May 1974
56	South Korea	15 May 1974
57	Finland	21 September 1974
58	Tanzania	10 January 1975
59	Morocco	18 February 1975
60	Cuba	25 March 1975
61	Cambodia	18 April 1975
62	Vietnam	15 May 1975
63	Kenya	3 June 1975
64	Mexico	25 November 1975
65	Luxembourg	27 November 1975
66	Nigeria	20 December 1975
67	Libya	30 December 1975
68	Peru	28 January 1976
69	Brazil	7 February 1976
70	Portugal	1 September 1976
71	Bahrain	13 January 1977
72	Oman	21 January 1977
73	Qatar	21 January 1977
74	United Arab Emirates	22 January 1977
75	Saudi Arabia	15 March 1977
76	Costa Rica	16 August 1977
77	Maldives	1 August 1980
78	Cyprus	18 August 1980
79	Mauritius	12 February 1981
80	Iceland	25 May 1981
81	Bhutan	3 June 1983
—	Holy See	10 September 1983
82	Malta	25 September 1983
83	Brunei	3 February 1984
84	Panama	15 February 1984
85	Tunisia	14 April 1984
86	Somalia	24 October 1984
87	Zimbabwe	27 November 1984
88	Gabon	17 June 1985
89	Yemen	25 December 1985
90	Fiji	12 June 1986
91	Zambia	10 September 1986
92	Mozambique	30 September 1986
93	Nicaragua	2 October 1986
94	Seychelles	10 October 1986
95	Venezuela	27 April 1987
96	Colombia	6 May 1987
97	Bolivia	20 May 1987
98	Estonia	20 April 1992
99	Latvia	20 April 1992
100	Ukraine	15 January 1993
101	Armenia	26 March 1993
102	Kyrgyzstan	26 March 1993
103	Belarus	19 July 1993
104	Moldova	20 July 1993
105	Slovakia	4 March 1994
106	Guyana	22 June 1994
107	South Africa	28 July 1994
108	Azerbaijan	28 February 1995
109	Slovenia	2 December 1997
110	North Macedonia	6 January 1998
111	Croatia	6 February 1998
112	Ireland	19 August 1999
113	Bosnia and Herzegovina	12 January 2000
114	Lithuania	8 February 2005
115	San Marino	10 August 2005
116	Tajikistan	13 September 2005
117	Georgia	22 September 2005
118	Turkmenistan	17 October 2005
119	Ecuador	21 June 2006
120	Paraguay	2 August 2006
121	Guatemala	8 August 2006
122	Honduras	18 August 2006
123	Vanuatu	19 September 2006
124	Andorra	22 September 2006
125	Democratic Republic of the Congo	22 September 2006
126	Haiti	23 May 2007
127	Saint Vincent and the Grenadines	27 September 2007
128	Dominican Republic	28 September 2007
129	Botswana	8 January 2009
130	Mali	19 November 2009
131	Lesotho	18 May 2010
132	Montenegro	18 July 2011
133	Solomon Islands	15 December 2011
134	Monaco	26 March 2012
135	Uruguay	18 April 2012
136	Mauritania	4 December 2012
137	Tuvalu	11 December 2012
138	Samoa	28 March 2013
139	Papua New Guinea	12 April 2013
140	Kazakhstan	30 June 2015
141	Jamaica	1 October 2015
142	Guinea	12 May 2016
143	El Salvador	21 September 2016
144	Uganda	12 June 2017
145	Ivory Coast	16 June 2017
146	Djibouti	14 July 2017
147	Antigua and Barbuda	25 July 2017
148	Cape Verde	3 August 2017
149	Liberia	17 August 2017
150	Niger	20 September 2017
151	Eritrea	31 October 2017
152	Bahamas	7 November 2017
153	Liechtenstein	24 November 2017
154	Angola	9 December 2017
155	Burkina Faso	29 December 2017
156	Benin	23 January 2018
157	Uzbekistan	26 January 2018
158	Saint Kitts and Nevis	30 May 2018
159	Burundi	6 June 2018
160	Rwanda	20 July 2018
161	Madagascar	26 September 2018
162	Suriname	11 October 2018
163	Togo	22 March 2019
164	Equatorial Guinea	30 April 2019
165	Eswatini	9 May 2019
166	Saint Lucia	27 August 2019
167	Ghana	25 September 2019
168	Dominica	30 April 2021
169	Gambia	24 May 2021
170	Sierra Leone	29 June 2021
171	Barbados	8 December 2021
172	Timor-Leste	11 February 2022
173	Palau	21 March 2022
174	South Sudan	28 March 2022
175	Belize	1 April 2022
176	Trinidad and Tobago	16 June 2022
177	Malawi	16 February 2023
178	Nauru	4 May 2023
179	Cameroon	22 June 2023
180	Marshall Islands	23 June 2023
181	Tonga	1 March 2024
182	Kiribati	17 July 2024
183	Guinea-Bissau	1 September 2026
184	Federated States of Micronesia	14 September 2026
185	Grenada	22 September 2026
186	Namibia	25 September 2026
187	Senegal	26 September 2026

== International disputes ==
Nepal joined the UN in 1955. The Nepalese map filed at the UN in 1955 was accepted without any disputes by any other UN member. Both India and China without any objections, accepted the map of Nepal filed at the UN in 1955 while Nepal's third neighbor, Kingdom of Sikkim was not a member of the UN.

However, with degradation of relations between India and China during late 1950s, Indian government initiated a 'Forward Policy' along its northern frontiers which resulted in Indian military outposts being built in all unmanned areas along India's northern border. Successive Nepali government's from 1990 onwards, have continued their objection to Indian occupation of certain Nepali territories under the guise of India's 'Forward Policy'. A joint border commission continues to work on resolving the issue of removal of Indian military outpost from Nepal's Kalapani territory. As of 2017, Nepal has border disputes with India at Lipulekh and Kalapani between Darchula district and Uttarakhand, and at Susta bordering Bihar's Nawalpur district. In 2018, EPG (Eminent Persons Group), a joint committee between Nepal and India finished a report on the disputed territories between these two countries. The report is yet to be submitted to the head of governments of both countries.

== International trade ==
Nepal has been a member of the World Trade Organization (WTO) since 23 April 2004 and on 24 January 2017 became the 108th WTO member to ratify the WTO's Trade Facilitation Agreement.

== Bilateral relations ==
=== Afghanistan ===
(Afghanistan) (Nepal)

=== Austria ===
(Austria) (Nepal)

=== Bangladesh ===
(Bangladesh) (Nepal)

Nepal welcomed Bangladesh's independence on 16 January 1972. The turning point for the two nations occurred in April 1976, when the two nations signed, a four-point agreement on technical cooperation, trade, transit and civil aviation. They both seek cooperation in the fields of power generation and development of water resources. In 1986, relations further improved when Bangladesh insisted Nepal should be included on a deal regarding the distribution of water from the Ganges River. Also recently Nepal and Bangladesh had signed MOU's that Nepal would sell 10,000 MW of electricity to Bangladesh once its larger projects are completed.

=== Bhutan ===
(Bhutan) (Nepal)

Relations with Bhutan have been strained since 1992 over the nationality and possible repatriation of refugees from Bhutan.

=== Canada ===
(Canada) (Nepal)

Many Nepalese politicians and government officials criticized Canadian diplomats in the aftermath of the Kabul attack on Canadian Embassy guards in which the majority of victims were Nepalese citizens. Members of Parliament were among those who were critical of the way that Canada treated its security contractors at the embassy, leading to meetings in Ottawa between Nepalese and Canadian diplomats, including ambassador Nadir Patel.

=== China ===
(China) (Nepal)

Nepal formally established relations with the People's Republic of China on 1 August 1955. The two countries share 1414 kilometers long border in the Himalayan range along the northern side of Nepal. Nepal has established its embassy in Beijing, opened consulates general in Lhasa, Hong Kong and Guangzhou and appointed an honorary consul in Shanghai.

Nepal's relations with China have grown closer following China's Belt and Road Initiative.

=== Denmark ===
(Denmark) (Nepal)

See Denmark–Nepal relations.

=== European Union ===
(European Union) (Nepal)

=== France ===
(France) (Nepal)

Nepal and the French Republic entered into diplomatic relations on 20 April 1949. Bilateral economic cooperation programme commenced in February 1981 when the two countries signed the First Protocol amounting to French Franc 50 million loan which was converted into debt in 1989. Food aid and the counterpart funds that it generated have been the main form of aid since 1991. Main areas of cooperation are national seismologic network, petroleum exploration, restructuring of Water Supply Corporation, the Kavre Integrated Project and Gulmi and Arghakhanchi Rural Development Project, rehabilitation of airports, 'food for work', and others.

Nepal and France have signed an agreement concerning Reciprocal Promotion and Protection of Investment in 1983. The major areas of French investment are hotels, restaurants, medicine, aluminium windows and doors, vehicle body building sectors. Alcatelhad became the leading supplier of the Nepal Telecommunication Corporation, with 200,000 lines installed, and fibre optic cables. Cegelec secured a 24 million dollars contract in respect of the construction of Kali Gandaki hydroelectric project.

The Government of Nepal awarded a contract to Oberthur Technologies of France in 2010, for printing, supply, and delivery of Machine Readable Passports. A significant number of French tourists (24,097 in 2014, 16, 405 in 2015, and, 20,863 in 2016) arrive in Nepal from France each year.

=== India ===
(India) (Nepal)

There are two types of bilateral relations between the nations of India and Nepal. They are traditional and official. The traditional bilateral relation between the two nations is associated with the livelihood and familial relationship between the people of these two nations. This relationship is colloquially known as Roti-Beti ka Rishta. The official bilateral relation between the two nations refers to the relationship between the two central governments in these countries. It is guided by the Treaty of Peace and Friendship 1950 between India and Nepal. From 23 September 2015 to February 2016, the borderblockade on Nepal was imposed by the enthic Madheshi people of Nepal, in protest against amendments to Nepal's constitution but the Government of Nepal speculatively blamed India in this regard.

=== Israel ===
(Israel) (Nepal)

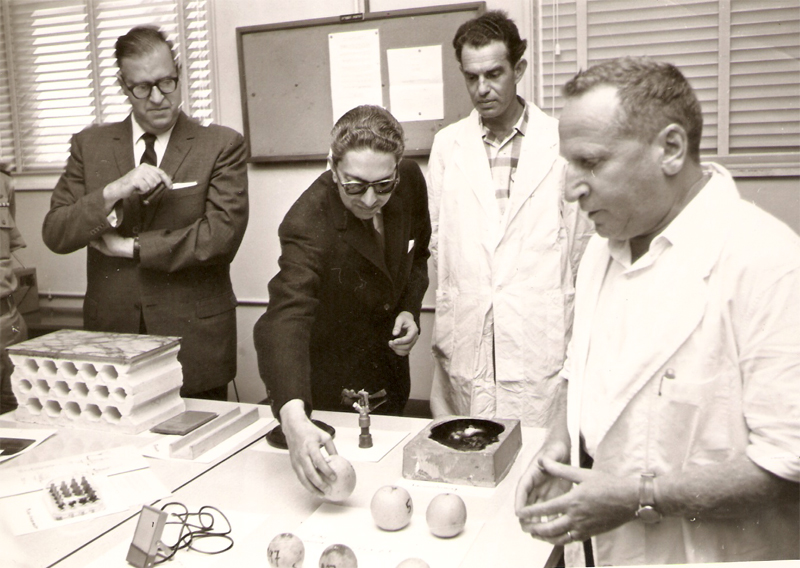
King Mahendra of Nepal (second from left) in a 1958 visit to Israel's Weizmann Institute of Science.

Nepal was the first and until recently the only nation in South and Central Asia to establish diplomatic ties with Israel. The bilateral relation between the two countries has been good. Traditionally, Nepal votes in favor of Israel at the UN and abstains from resolution opposed by the Israeli government barring few exceptions. Israel-Nepal relations are based on mutual security concerns.

Bishweshwar Prasad Koirala, Prime Minister of Nepal from 1959 to 1960, had a strongly pro-Israel foreign policy. King Mahendra visited Israel in 1963 and maintained Koirala's special relationship.

=== Japan ===
(Japan) (Nepal)

Nepal-Japan relations date back to the late eighteenth century. The relationship became formal with the establishment of diplomatic relations on 1 September 1956. The Embassy of Nepal was established in Tokyo in 1965 and Japan established its embassy in Kathmandu in 1967. Nepal has honorary consulates in Osaka and Fukuoka. Japan is one of the largest aid donors to Nepal.

Japan is the 2nd most preferred destination for abroad study to the Nepali students.

=== Luxembourg ===
(Luxembourg) (Nepal)

- Luxembourg is accredited to Nepal from its embassy in New Delhi, India.
- Nepal is accredited to Luxembourg from its embassy in Brussels, Belgium.

=== Malaysia ===
(Malaysia) (Nepal)

Malaysia has an embassy in Kathmandu, and Nepal has an embassy in Kuala Lumpur. Both countries established diplomatic relations on 1 January 1960, with bilateral relations between Malaysia and Nepal have developed from historic grounds.

=== Mexico ===
(Mexico) (Nepal)

Both nations established diplomatic relations in 1975.

- Mexico is accredited to Nepal from its embassy in New Delhi, India and maintains an honorary consulate in Kathmandu.
- Nepal is accredited to Mexico from its embassy in Washington, D.C., United States and maintains an honorary consulate in Mexico City.

=== Norway ===
(Norway) (Nepal)

Diplomatic relations were established on 26 January 1973. Norway established an embassy in Kathmandu in 2000. Norway's aid to Nepal was around 32 million USD in 2017. Norwegian aid prioritizes education, good governance and energy.

In 2008, Norwegian Prime Minister Jens Stoltenberg and Minister of the Environment and International Development Erik Solheim visited Nepal. In 2009, Prime Minister Prachanda visited Norway. In May 2008, a small bomb exploded outside the Norwegian embassy in Kathmandu. No one was injured.

=== Pakistan ===
(Pakistan) (Nepal)

The bilateral relations between Nepal and the Islamic Republic of Pakistan were fully established between 1962 and 1963.

=== Russia ===
(Russia) (Nepal)

=== Serbia ===
(Serbia) (Nepal)

- A number of bilateral agreements have been concluded and are in force between both countries.

=== South Korea ===
(South Korea) (Nepal)

In addition to the in-kind and monetary donations and emergency relief workers sent by the government of the Republic of Korea immediately after the latest earthquake in Nepal the Korean government provided grant aid worth 10 million US dollars to assist with Nepal's recovery and reconstruction efforts.

=== Turkey ===
(Turkey) (Nepal)

=== United Kingdom ===
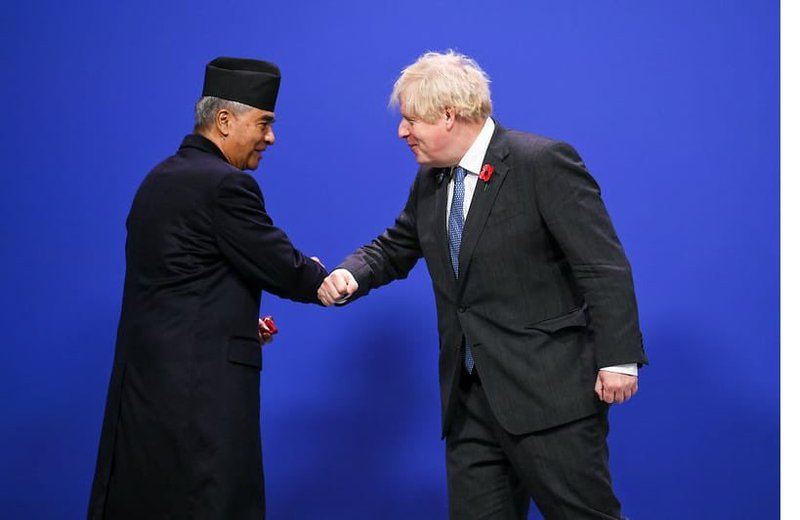
Nepal's PM Sher Bahadur Deuba and UK PM Borris Johnson in London in 2021 COP26

(United Kingdom) (Nepal)

Nepal established diplomatic relations with the United Kingdom on 4 March 1816 with the ratification of the Treaty of Sugauli.

- Nepal maintains an embassy in London.
- The United Kingdom is accredited to Nepal through its embassy in Kathmandu.

Both countries share common membership of the World Trade Organization. Bilaterally the two countries have a Development Partnership, and an Investment Agreement.

=== United States ===
(United States) (Nepal)

Nepal and the United States established the diplomatic relations between them on 25 April 1947.

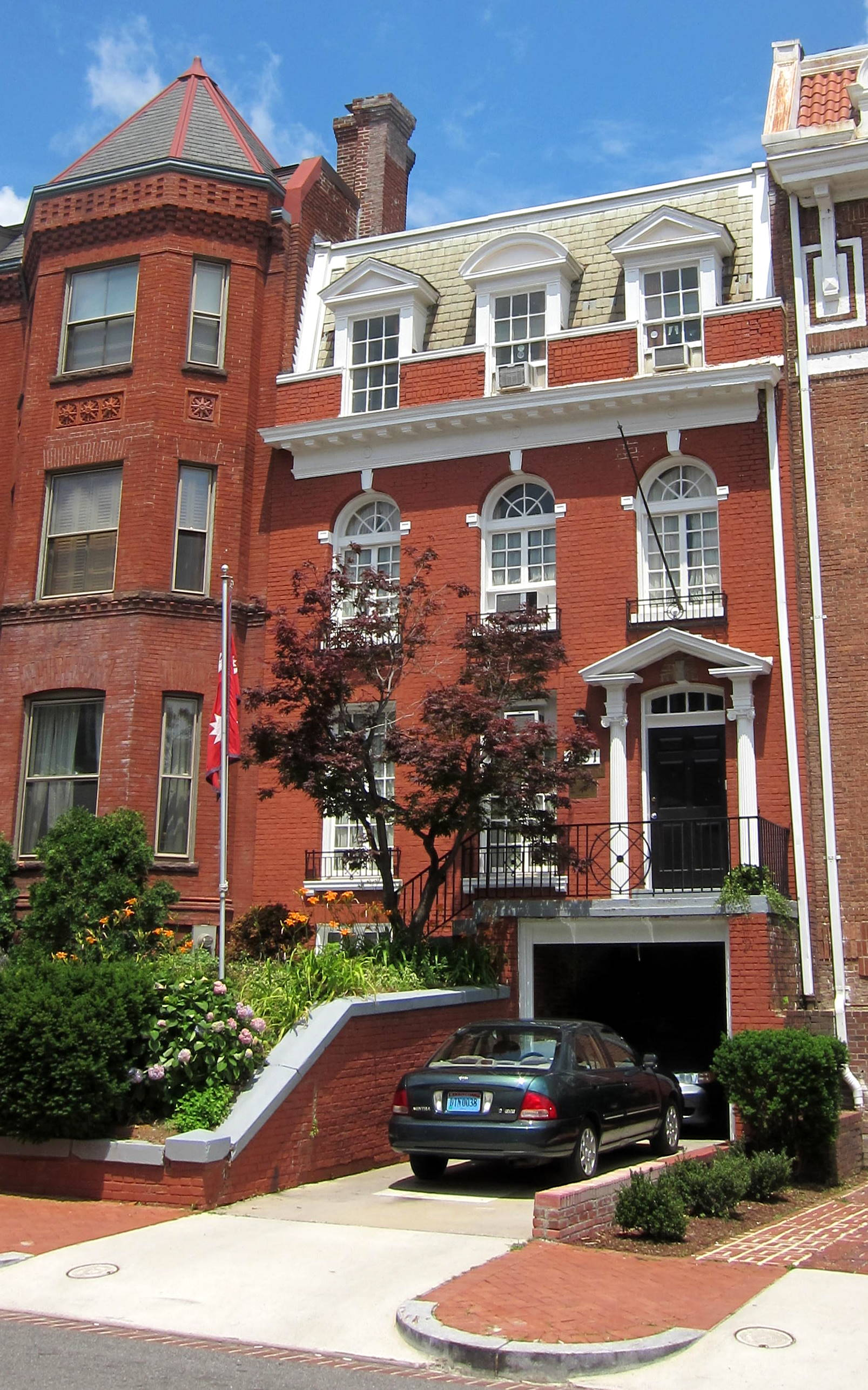
Embassy of Nepal in Washington, D.C.

== See also ==
- Ministry of Foreign Affairs (Nepal)
- Indo-Nepal Treaty of Peace and Friendship
- List of diplomatic missions in Nepal
- List of diplomatic missions of Nepal
