= List of South Korean films of 2020 =

The following is a list of South Korean films released in 2020.

== Box office ==
The highest-grossing South Korean films released in 2020, by domestic box office gross revenue, are as follows:

Highest-grossing films released in 2020
| Rank | Title | Distributor | Domestic gross |
|---|---|---|---|
| 1 | The Man Standing Next | Showbox | $37,967,597 |
| 2 | Deliver Us from Evil | CJ Entertainment | $35,551,907 |
| 3 | Peninsula | Next Entertainment World | $30,459,137 |
| 4 | Hitman: Agent Jun | Lotte Cultureworks | $18,985,336 |
| 5 | #Alive | Lotte Cultureworks | $14,706,410 |
| 6 | Pawn | CJ Entertainment | $13,584,336 |
| 7 | Steel Rain 2: Summit | Lotte Cultureworks | $13,503,082 |
| 8 | Samjin Company English Class | Lotte Cultureworks | $12,876,865 |
| 9 | Collectors | CJ Entertainment | $12,676,994 |
| 10 | Honest Candidate | Next Entertainment World | $11,838,549 |

== Released ==
=== January–March ===
| Opening | | English title | Native title | Director(s) | Cast | Ref. |
|---|---|---|---|---|---|---|
| J A N U A R Y | 2 | Dogs in the House | 청춘빌라 살인사건 | Shin Hae-kang | Kim Young-ho, Kim Jung-pal, Yoon Bong-gil | |
| J A N U A R Y | 9 | Don't Cry for Me Sudan: Shukran Baba | 울지마 톤즈 2: 슈크란 바바 | Kang Sung-ok | Lee Tae-seok, Lee Geum-hee (narration) | |
| J A N U A R Y | 9 | Montmartre de Papa | 몽마르트 파파 | Min Byung-woo | Min Hyung-sik, Lee Woon-sook, Min Byung-woo (narration) | |
| J A N U A R Y | 15 | Secret Zoo | 해치지않아 | Son Jae-gon | Ahn Jae-hong, Kang So-ra | |
| J A N U A R Y | 16 | Gang | 갱 | Jo Ba-reun | Cha Ji-hyuk, Jo Sun-gi, Ok Yoon-joong, Baek Jae-min | |
| J A N U A R Y | 22 | The Man Standing Next | 남산의 부장들 | Woo Min-ho | Lee Byung-hun, Lee Sung-min, Kwak Do-won, Lee Hee-joon | |
| J A N U A R Y | 22 | Mr. Zoo: The Missing VIP | 미스터 주: 사라진 VIP | Kim Tae-yoon | Lee Sung-min, Kim Seo-hyung, Bae Jung-nam, Shin Ha-kyun | |
| J A N U A R Y | 22 | Hitman: Agent Jun | 히트맨 | Choi Won-sub | Kwon Sang-woo, Jung Joon-ho | |
| J A N U A R Y | 23 | Tiny Light | 작은 빛 | Cho Min-jae | Kwak Jin-moo, Shin Mun-sung, Byun Joong-hee, Kim Hyun | |
| J A N U A R Y | 30 | The Land of Seonghye | 성혜의나라 | Jeong Hyung-seok | Song Ji-in, Kang Doo, Lee Mi-do | |
| J A N U A R Y | 30 | Pinkfong Cinema Concert: Space Adventure | 핑크퐁 시네마 콘서트: 우주대탐험 | Byun Hee-sun | Jo Kyung-yi, Kim Seo-yeong, Jung Jae-heon, Kim Eun-ah | |
| J A N U A R Y | 30 | Death Cab | 살인택시괴담: 야경 챕터2 | Oh In-chun | Kim Jae-in, Kim Do-geon, Kim Joon | |
| F E B R U A R Y | 5 | The Closet | 클로젯 | Kim Kwang-bin | Ha Jung-woo, Kim Nam-gil | |
| F E B R U A R Y | 6 | Miniforce: Dino King | 극장판 미니특공대: 공룡왕 디노 | Lee Young-joon | Um Sang-hyun, Yang Jung-hwa, Jeon Tae-yeol, Shin Yong-woo | |
| F E B R U A R Y | 12 | Honest Candidate | 정직한 후보 | Jang Yoo-jeong | Ra Mi-ran, Kim Moo-yul, Na Moon-hee | |
| F E B R U A R Y | 13 | Spirit: The Beginning of Fear | 혼: 공포의 시작 | Yoo Sung-ho | Ok Ji-young, Choi Kyu-hwan, Kim Seung-hyun, Ji E-suu | |
| F E B R U A R Y | 19 | Beasts Clawing at Straws | 지푸라기라도 잡고 싶은 짐승들 | Kim Yong-hoon | Jeon Do-yeon, Jung Woo-sung, Youn Yuh-jung, Bae Seong-woo | |
| F E B R U A R Y | 20 | Pray | 기도하는 남자 | Kang Dong-heon | Park Hyuk-kwon, Ryu Hyun-kyung, Nam Ki-ae | |
| F E B R U A R Y | 27 | Heart | 하트 | Jung Ga-young | Jung Ga-young, Lee Suk-hyung, Choi Tae-hwan | |
| F E B R U A R Y | 27 | Shiho | 시호 | Hong Soo-dong | Shin Eun-kyung, Yoon Hee-seok, Kim Do-woo, Jin Hye-kyung, Sung Hyun, Pyo Ye-jin | |
| F E B R U A R Y | 27 | The Rainy Season | 장마 | Eum Jung-hyun, Lee Yong-nam | Lee Eun-taek | |
| F E B R U A R Y | 27 | Untold | 기억의 전쟁 | Lee Kil-bora | Nguyễn Thị Thanh, Nguyễn Lập, Đình Câm, Nguyễn Thị Thanh | |
| M A R C H | 5 | Lucky Chan-sil | 찬실이는 복도 많지 | Kang Dong-heon | Gang Mal-geum, Youn Yuh-jung, Kim Young-in | |
| M A R C H | 12 | The Nightmare | 악몽 | Song Jung-woo | Oh Ji-ho, Cha Ji-hun, Hwang Geum-hee, Shin Rin-ah | |
| M A R C H | 19 | Dreamer | 비행 | Jo Sung-bin | Hong Geun-taek, Cha Ji-hyun | |
| M A R C H | 25 | Move the Grave | 이장 | Jung Seung-oh | Jang Liu, Lee Sun-hee, Gong Min-jung | |
| M A R C H | 25 | Are You in Love? | 사랑하고 있습니까? | Kim Jung-kwon | Kim So-eun, Sung Hoon | |

=== April–June ===
| Opening | | English title | Native title | Director(s) | Cast | Ref. |
|---|---|---|---|---|---|---|
| A P R I L | 9 | Justice High | 공수도 | Chae Yeo-joon | Oh Seung-hoon, Jung Da-eun, Son Woo-hyun | |
| A P R I L | 15 | Search Out | 서치 아웃 | Kwak Jung | Lee Si-eon, Kim Sung-cheol, Heo Ga-yoon | |
| A P R I L | 15 | Ghost Ship | 유령선 | Kim Ji-young | Park Ho-san (narration) | |
| A P R I L | 22 | Invitation | 그녀의 비밀정원 | Kim In-sik | Ye Ji-won, Choi Woo-je | |
| A P R I L | 23 | Time to Hunt | 사냥의 시간 | Yoon Sung-hyun | Lee Je-hoon, Ahn Jae-hong, Choi Woo-shik, Park Jung-min | |
| A P R I L | 23 | The Hill of Wind | 바람의 언덕 | Park Suk-young | Jung Eun-kyung, Jang Sun | |
| A P R I L | 23 | Last Blues, Last Dance | 대전 블루스 | Park Chur-woong | Ban Min-jung, Lee Ji-hyun, Hyun Suk, Lee Jong-gook | |
| A P R I L | 29 | Hotel Lake | 호텔 레이크 | Yoon Eun-kyung | Lee Se-young, Park Ji-young | |
| A P R I L | 30 | Beyond That Mountain | 저 산 너머 | Choi Jong-tae | Lee Kyung-hoon, Lee Hang-na, Ahn Nae-sang, Kang Shin-il | |
| M A Y | 6 | Shooting Girls | 슈팅걸스 | Bae Hyo-min | Jung Woong-in, Lee Bi-an, Jung Ye-jin, Jung Ji-hye | |
| M A Y | 7 | Jukdo Surfing Diary | 죽도 서핑 다이어리 | Lee Hyun-seung | Jeon Hye-bin, Jung Tae-woo, Oh Kwang-rok, Park Ho-san | |
| M A Y | 14 | The Boy From Nowhere | 파도를 걷는 소년 | Choi Chang-hwan | Kwak Min-gyu, Kim Hyun-mok, Min Dong-ho, Kim Hae-na | |
| M A Y | 14 | Our Cat | 고양이 집사 | Lee Hee-seop | Im Soo-jung (narration) | |
| M A Y | 14 | King of Prison | 범털 | Kang Tae-ho | Lee Sol-gu, Kang In-sung, Yoo Sang-jae, Lee Hyun-woong | |
| M A Y | 14 | Sixball | 식스볼 | Chae Ki-jun | Lee Dae-han, Kang Ye-bin, Hong Dal-pyo | |
| M A Y | 21 | Bori | 나는보리 | Kim Jin-yu | Kim Ah-song, Lee Rin-ha, Kwak Jin-seok, Heo Ji-na | |
| M A Y | 27 | Jazzy Misfits | 초미의 관심사 | Nam Yeon-woo | Jo Min-su, Cheetah | |
| M A Y | 27 | Free Minu | 안녕, 미누 | Jee Hye-wo | Minod Moktan, Soe Moe Thu, Soe Thiha, Song Myung-hoon | |
| M A Y | 28 | Run Boy Run | 런 보이 런 | Oh Won-jae | Jang Dong-yoon, Seo Byuk-joon | |
| M A Y | 28 | The Lapse | 초능력소년사건 | Chuck Chae | Chengming Dong, Aohui Qu, Yihan Chen | |
| M A Y | 29 | Somewhere in Between | 국도극장 | Jeon Ji-hee | Lee Dong-hwi, Lee Han-wi, Shin Shin-ae, Lee Sang-hee | |
| J U N E | 4 | Intruder | 침입자 | Son Won-pyeong | Song Ji-hyo, Kim Moo-yul | |
| J U N E | 4 | A French Woman | 프랑스여자 | Kim Hee-jung | Kim Ho-jung, Kim Ji-young, Kim Young-min, Ryu Abel | |
| J U N E | 10 | Innocence | 결백 | Park Sang-hyun | Shin Hye-sun, Bae Jong-ok, Huh Joon-ho | |
| J U N E | 10 | Eyes on Me: The Movie | 아이즈 온 미: 더 무비 | | Iz*One | |
| J U N E | 10 | Can You Hear Me? | 들리나요? | Kim Bong-han, Shin Seung-hwan | Kim Chang-ok | |
| J U N E | 18 | Me and Me | 사라진 시간 | Jung Jin-young | Cho Jin-woong, Bae Soo-bin, Jung Hae-kyun, Cha Soo-yeon | |
| J U N E | 18 | Baseball Girl | 야구소녀 | Choi Yoon-tae | Lee Joo-young, Lee Joon-hyuk, Yeom Hye-ran, Song Young-kyu, Kwak Dong-yeon | |
| J U N E | 18 | Hot Blooded Detective | 열혈형사 | Yoon Yeo-chang | Kim In-kwon, Janska | |
| J U N E | 24 | #Alive | #살아있다 | Cho Il-hyung | Yoo Ah-in, Park Shin-hye | |

=== July–September ===
| Opening | | English title | Native title | Director(s) | Cast | Ref. |
|---|---|---|---|---|---|---|
| J U L Y | 1 | The Singer | 소리꾼 | Cho Jung-rae | Lee Bong-geun, Lee Yoo-ri, Kim Dong-wan, Kim Ha-yeon, Kim Min-jun | |
| J U L Y | 2 | Si, Nario | 시, 나리오 | Kim Dong-won | Shin So-yul, Oh Tae-kyung | |
| J U L Y | 2 | A Bedsore | 욕창 | Shim Hye-jung | Kim Jong-goo, Kang Ae-shim, Jeon Guk-hyang, Kim Do-young, Kang Mal-geum | |
| J U L Y | 7 | Killerswell: Our Space | 킬러스웰: 아워 스페이스 | Kim Hye-sil | Oh Dong-min, Kim Min-ha | |
| J U L Y | 9 | Road Family | 불량한 가족 | Jang Jae-il | Park Won-sang, Park Cho-rong, Do Ji-han, Kim Da-ye | |
| J U L Y | 9 | Fanfare | 팡파레 | Lee Don-ku | Lim Hwa-young, Park Jong-hwan, Nam Yeon-woo | |
| J U L Y | 9 | Teuri | 테우리 | Inan | Seo Hyun-woo, Han Sa-myung, Seo Jin-won, Yoo Ji-yeon | |
| J U L Y | 9 | Resurrection | 부활 | Koo Soo-hwan | Lee Tae-seok | |
| J U L Y | 15 | Peninsula | 반도 | Yeon Sang-ho | Gang Dong-won, Lee Jung-hyun, Kwon Hae-hyo, Koo Kyo-hwan | |
| J U L Y | 16 | Gwangju Video: The Missing | 광주비디오: 사라진 4시간 | Lee Jo-hoon | Min Seung-yeon, Park Sang-jeung, Go Jae-hyeong, Gi-choon | |
| J U L Y | 23 | The Prisoner | 프리즈너 | Yang Kil-yong | Oh Ji-ho, Jo Woon | |
| J U L Y | 29 | Steel Rain 2: Summit | 강철비2: 정상회담 | Yang Woo-seok | Jung Woo-sung, Kwak Do-won, Yoo Yeon-seok, Ryu Soo-young | |
| J U L Y | 30 | On the Road, Khaosan Tango | 카오산 탱고 | Kim Beomsam | Hong Wan-pyo, Hyunri, Oh Chang-kyung | |
| J U L Y | 30 | Again | 어게인 | Jo Chang-yeol | Kim Ye-eun, Ye Soo-jung, Soy Kim, Kim Hong-pyo | |
| J U L Y | 30 | Ruby | 루비 | Park Han-jin | Park Ji-yeon, Son Eun-ji, Kim Dong-seok | |
| A U G U S T | 5 | Deliver Us from Evil | 다만 악에서 구하소서 | Hong Won-chan | Hwang Jung-min, Lee Jung-jae, Park Jung-min, Choi Hee-seo | |
| A U G U S T | 12 | OK! MADAM | 오케이! 마담 | Lee Cheol-ha | Park Sung-woong, Uhm Jung-hwa, Lee Sang-yoon, Lee Sun-bin, Bae Jung-nam | |
| A U G U S T | 13 | Welcome to the Guesthouse | 어서오시게스트하우스 | Shim Yo-han | Lee Hak-joo, Park Da-hyun, Shin Jae-hoon | |
| A U G U S T | 19 | The Story of an Old Couple: Stage Movie | 늙은 부부이야기: 스테이지 무비 | Shin Tae-yeon | Kim Myung-gon, Cha Yoo-kyung | |
| A U G U S T | 20 | Moving On | 남매의 여름밤 | Yoon Dan-bi | Yang Heung-joo, Park Hyun-young, Choi Jung-woon, Park Seung-joon | |
| A U G U S T | 20 | An Old Lady | 69세 | Lim Seon-ae | Ye Soo-jung, Ki Joo-bong, Kim Joon-kyung | |
| A U G U S T | 20 | The Therapist: Fist of Tae-baek | 태백권 | Choi Sang-hoon | Oh Ji-ho, Shin So-yul, Jung Eui-wook | |
| A U G U S T | 20 | East Asia Anti-Japan Armed Front | 동아시아반일무장전선 | Kim Mi-rye | | |
| A U G U S T | 27 | Remain | 리메인 | Kim Min-kyung | Lee Ji-yeon, Kim Young-jae, Ha Jun | |
| A U G U S T | 27 | Farewell Restaurant | 이별식당 | Lim Wang-tae | Go Yoon, Aprilann, Song Geul-song-geul | |
| A U G U S T | 27 | Fukuoka | 후쿠오카 | Zhang Lü | Kwon Hae-hyo, Yoon Je-moon, Park So-dam | |
| S E P T E M B E R | 2 | Oh! My Gran | 오! 문희 | Jang Se-kyo | Na Moon-hee, Lee Hee-joon | |
| S E P T E M B E R | 2 | On July 7 | 7월7일 | Son Seung-hyun | Jung Yi-seo, Kim Hee-chan | |
| S E P T E M B E R | 3 | Journey to Kailash | 카일라스 가는 길 | Jung Hyung-min | | |
| S E P T E M B E R | 9 | Beauty Water | 기기괴괴 성형수 | Cho Kyung-hoon | Moon Nam-sook, Jang Min-hyeok, Jo Hyeon-jeong, Kim Bo-young, Choi Seung-hoon | |
| S E P T E M B E R | 10 | The Art of Loving | 이별의 목적 | Lee Gun-woo | Han Hae-in, Kim Jung-hoon | |
| S E P T E M B E R | 10 | Please Don't Save Me | 나를 구하지 마세요 | Jung Yeon-kyung | Choi Ro-woon, Cho Seo-yeon | |
| S E P T E M B E R | 17 | The Woman Who Ran | 도망친 여자 | Hong Sang-soo | Kim Min-hee, Seo Young-hwa, Song Seon-mi, Kim Sae-byuk | |
| S E P T E M B E R | 17 | Magical: Make the Princess Laugh | 매지컬: 공주를 웃겨라 | Jeong Yoon-cheul | Park Ji-yoon, Nam Doh-hyeong, Jang Gwang, Lee Bong-joon, Kim Sara | |
| S E P T E M B E R | 18 | Red Shoes and the Seven Dwarfs (American theatrical release) | 레드슈즈 | Sung-ho Hong | Chloë Grace Moretz, Sam Claflin, Gina Gershon, Patrick Warburton, Jim Rash | |
| S E P T E M B E R | 23 | The Swordsman | 검객 | Choi Jae-hoon | Jang Hyuk, Jung Man-sik, Joe Taslim, Kim Hyun-soo | |
| S E P T E M B E R | 23 | Diva | 디바 | Jo Seul-ye | Shin Min-a, Lee Yoo-young, Lee Kyu-hyung | |
| S E P T E M B E R | 23 | Samsara | 구르는 수레바퀴 | Moon Jung-yoon | Kim Myung-gon, Lee Yeong-seok, Kim Joon-bae, Hong Hee-yong | |
| S E P T E M B E R | 24 | Break the Silence: The Movie | 브레이크 더 사일런스: 더 무비 | Park Jun-soo | BTS | |
| S E P T E M B E R | 24 | Da Capo - 2019 | 다시 만난 날들 | Shim Chan-yang | Hong Isaac, Jang Ha-eun, Seo Young-jae | |
| S E P T E M B E R | 29 | The Golden Holiday | 국제수사 | Kim Bong-han | Kwak Do-won, Kim Dae-myung, Kim Hee-won, Kim Sang-ho | |
| S E P T E M B E R | 29 | Pawn | 담보 | Kang Dae-gyu | Sung Dong-il, Ha Ji-won, Kim Hee-won, Park So-yi, Yunjin Kim | |
| S E P T E M B E R | 29 | Night of the Undead | 죽지않는 인간들의 밤 | Shin Jung-won | Lee Jung-hyun, Kim Sung-oh, Seo Young-hee, Yang Dong-geun, Lee Mi-do | |

=== October–December ===
| Opening | | English title | Native title | Director(s) | Cast | Ref. |
|---|---|---|---|---|---|---|
| O C T O B E R | 7 | The Wandering Chef | 밥정 | Park Hye-ryoung | Lim Ji-ho, Kim Soon-gyu | |
| O C T O B E R | 8 | P1H: A New World Begins | 피원에이치: 새로운 세계의 시작 | Director Chang | P1Harmony | |
| O C T O B E R | 14 | Blackpink: Light Up the Sky | 블랙핑크: 세상을 밝혀라 | Caroline Suh | Blackpink, Teddy Park, Joe Rhee | |
| O C T O B E R | 14 | The Name | 나의 이름 | Heo Dong-woo | Jeon So-min, Choi Jung-won | |
| O C T O B E R | 15 | Voice of Silence | 소리도 없이 | Hong Eui-jeong | Yoo Ah-in, Yoo Jae-myung, Moon Seung-ah | |
| O C T O B E R | 15 | Stone Skipping | 돌멩이 | Kim Jung-sik | Kim Dae-myung, Song Yoon-ah, Kim Eui-sung | |
| O C T O B E R | 21 | Samjin Company English Class | 삼진그룹 영어토익반 | Lee Jong-pil | Go Ah-sung, Esom, Park Hye-su | |
| O C T O B E R | 22 | Mr. Trot: The Movie | 미스터트롯: 더 무비 | Jeon Soo-kyung | Lim Young-woong, Young Tak, Lee Chan-won, Jung Dong-won, Jang Minho, Kim Hee-jae | |
| O C T O B E R | 22 | Paper Flower | 종이꽃 | Go Hoon | Ahn Sung-ki, Eugene, Kim Hye-seong, Jang Jae-hee | |
| O C T O B E R | 28 | Light for the Youth | 젊은이의 양지 | Shin Su-won | Kim Ho-jung, Yoon Chan-young, Jeong Ha-dam | |
| O C T O B E R | 28 | Take Me Home | 담쟁이 | Han Jay | Woo Mi-hwa, Lee Yeon, Kim Bo-min | |
| N O V E M B E R | 4 | Collectors | 도굴 | Park Jung-bae | Lee Je-hoon, Jo Woo-jin, Shin Hye-sun | |
| N O V E M B E R | 12 | More Than Family | 애비규환 | Choi Ha-na | Krystal Jung, Jang Hye-jin, Choi Deok-moon, Nam Moon-chul | |
| N O V E M B E R | 12 | The Day I Died: Unclosed Case | 내가 죽던 날 | Park Ji-wan | Kim Hye-soo, Lee Jung-eun, Roh Jeong-eui, Kim Sun-young | |
| N O V E M B E R | 27 | The Call | 콜 | Lee Chung-hyun | Park Shin-hye, Jeon Jong-seo | |
| D E C E M B E R | 10 | Josée | 조제 | Kim Jong-kwan | Nam Joo-hyuk, Han Ji-min | |
| D E C E M B E R | 10 | Boys be!! | 보이스 비 | Yoon Min-sik | Kim Hee-chan, Noh Young-hak | |

== See also ==
- List of South Korean films of 2019
- List of 2020 box office number-one films in South Korea
- 2020 in South Korea
- Impact of the COVID-19 pandemic on cinema
