= Park So-yi =

South Korean actress (born 2012)

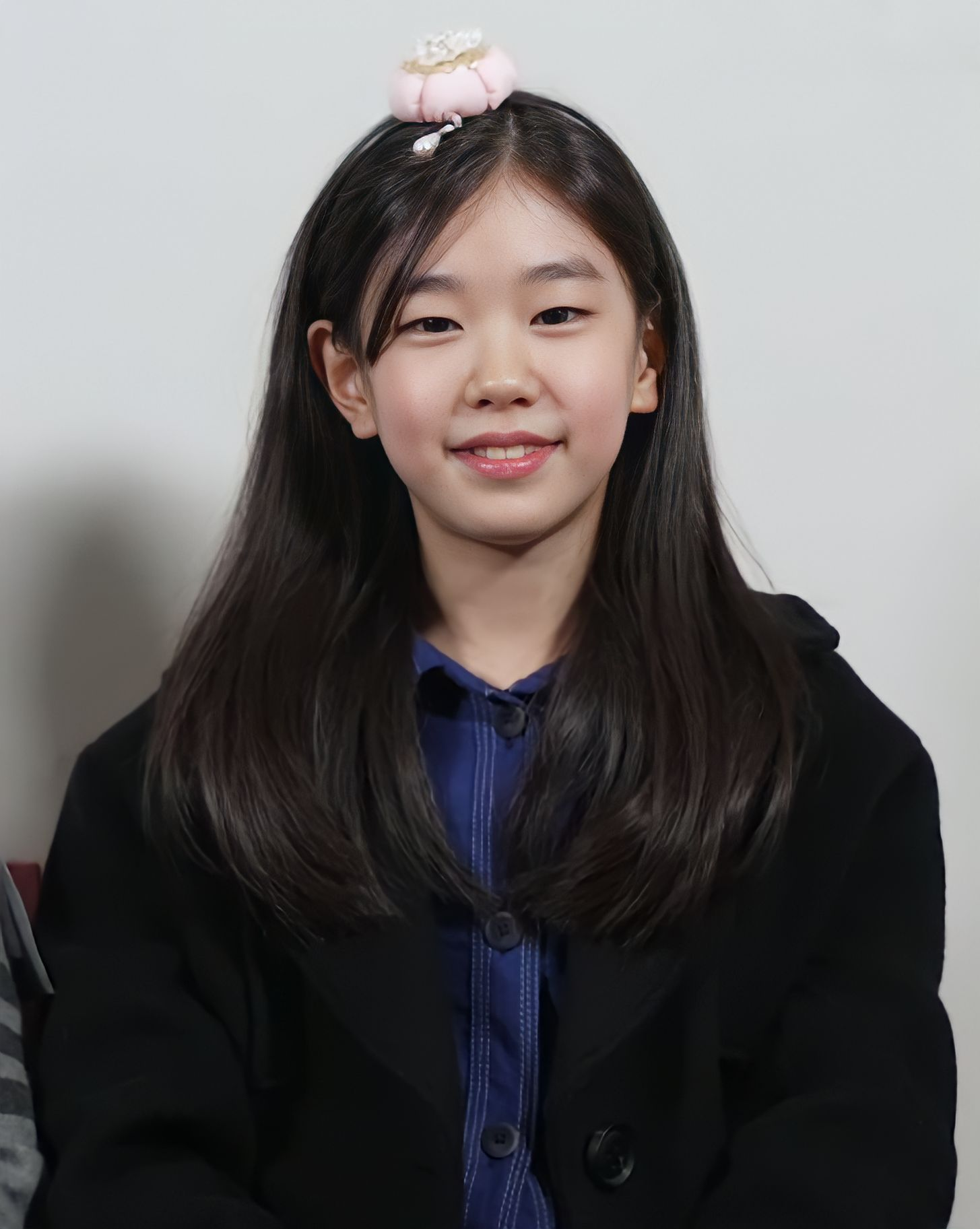
- Park in January 2023
- Born: March 12, 2012 (age 14); South Korea
- Occupation: Actress
- Years active: 2018–present
- Agent: VAST Entertainment

Korean name
- Hangul: 박소이
- Hanja: 朴素李
- RR: Bak Soi
- MR: Pak Soi
- Website: vastenm.com

Park So-yi (Korean: 박소이; born March 12, 2012) is a South Korean child actress. She debuted through the television series Mistress (2018) and is best known for her roles in the films Deliver Us from Evil (2020) and Pawn (2020), and the television series The Atypical Family (2024).

== Life and career ==
=== 2012–2017: Early Life ===
Park So-yi (Korean: 박소이) was born on March 12, 2012, in South Korea. She resides with her parents and younger brother and is enrolled in Dongmak Elementary School. Known as a model student in school, Park wished to become a doctor in her adulthood, opting as an alternative to acting.

Through the advice of her maternal uncle and aunt, Park's mother visited an acting academy for consultation; subsequently enrolling into the facility and being accepted into an audition for an ongoing work.

=== 2018–present: Career beginnings and rising popularity ===
Park's first television appearance as a child actress was at the age of six with the OCN television series Mistress (2018). She steadily gained domestic recognition for her role as Yoo-min in the film, Deliver Us from Evil (2020). Her performance in the film earned her a nomination for the Best New Actress award in film at the Baeksang Arts Awards. Recommended by director Yoon Je-kyoon, Park attended an audition to play 9-year-old Seung-yi who becomes collateral in the film Pawn (2020), having placed first in an audition for another film Yoon was preparing. There, she ranked first among 300 auditionees for the role. Its director, Kang Dae-gyu, suggested to Park's mother to read Les Miserables to her for better context on her role, finding similarities with Cosette and Seung-yi.

On April 19, 2021, YG Entertainment revealed Park had joined as their newest addition of actors. A source from the label revealed: "We are happy to work with actress Park So-yi, who has solid acting skills and exceptional potential. We plan on supporting her to the fullest in order to present her abilities as an actress to her satisfaction."

Park attained her first major role in television through the JTBC series The Atypical Family (2022), including Jang Ki-yong, Chun Woo-hee, and Claudia Kim. She played the role of Jang's middle-school daughter, and exerted seven months of dance training for the character.

In November 2025, after YG Entertainment announced it would end its actor management division, Park signed an exclusive contract with Hyun Bin's agency, VAST Entertainment.

== Public image ==
She was selected as the "Rising Star of the Year" by the Korean news agency, JoyNews24, and the "hottest" child actor of 2020 alongside Kim Joon, Kim Kang-hoon, and Lee Re.

== Other ventures ==
=== Endorsements ===
Following her debut in the television and film industry, Park was featured in her first-ever CF for Hanssem Kitchen. She was further scouted as an advertising model for brands: Renault Samsung Motors's SM6, KT Corporation, Visang Education Inc, Wise Camp, Seoul Milk, and Ministry of SMEs and Startups's Korea Donghaeng Sale.

SPA clothing apparel brand Top Ten Kids appointed Park as its first-ever endorsement model and muse in 2021 after 21 years of business; a representative from the brand stated: "Park So-yi was selected as the brand's "Little Muse" for her stylish and cute charm, as well as her rich emotions, as proven in various works."

=== Philanthropy ===
Park donated her entire talent fee that she received for her participation in the climate environmental change campaign entitled "Rewrite" (2021) by the Green Umbrella Children Foundation and Focus Media Korea; it was used to support low-income families suffering from climate change through the Green Umbrella Children Foundation.

== Filmography ==
=== Film ===
Year	Title	Role	Notes	Ref.
2019	Spring, Again	Ye-eun		
2020	The Hill of Wind	Park So-yi	Cameo	
2020	Lingering	Yoon Ji-yoo		
2020	Deliver Us from Evil	Yoo-min		
2020	Pawn	Seung-yi (young)		
2021	Unframed – Bandi	Jung Ban-di	Short film	
2022	Vanishing	Yoona	Korean-French Film	
2023	Switch	Ro-hee		
2023	Jung_E	Yoon Seo-hyun (young)		
2023	Dr. Cheon and Lost Talisman	Yoo-min		
2023	Taste of Horror: Tick Tock Tick Tock	Aji	Short film	
2023	The Boys	Lee Eun-seol	Cameo	

=== Television series ===
Year	Title	Role	Notes	Ref.
2018	Mistress	Kim Sang-hee		
2018	Ms. Hammurabi	Young-soo's daughter	Cameo (Episode 8)	
2018	Sketch	Swimming Pool Girl	Cameo (Episode 2)	
2018	Devilish Charm	Joo Ki-beum (young)		
2018	Encounter	Girl Who Lost her Toy	Cameo (Episode 9)	
2019	Her Private Life	Sung Deok-mi (young)		
2019	Different Dreams	Tae Joon's daughter	Guest appearance	
2019	My Country: The New Age	Seo Yeon (young)	Guest appearance	
2020	Do Do Sol Sol La La Sol	Goo Ra-ra (young)		
2021	She Would Never Know	Kang Ha-eun		
2021	Mouse	Choi Hong-joo (young)		
2021	Law School	Kang Byeol		
2021	High Class	Hwang Jae-in		
2022	Little Women	Oh In-ju (young)		
2023	See You in My 19th Life	Ban Ji-eum (young)		
2023	Revenant	Lee Mok-dan		
2023	O'PENing: "2:15"	Lim Hyun-soo	One act-drama	
2024	The Atypical Family	Bok In-a		

=== Web series ===
Year	Title	Role	Notes	Ref.
2022	Monstrous	Ha-young		
2024	Tarot		Voice appearance	

=== Music video appearances ===
Year	Title	Artist	Length	Ref.
2020	"Protecting the House" (집 지키기)	Jang Jae-in	3:23	

== Awards and nominations ==
Name of the award ceremony, year presented, award category, nominee(s) of the award, and the result of the nomination
Award ceremony	Year	Category	Nominee(s) / work(s)	Result	Ref.
APAN Star Awards	2024	Best Child Actress	The Atypical Family	Won	
Baeksang Arts Awards	2021	Best New Actress – Film	Deliver Us from Evil	Nominated	
Chunsa Film Art Awards	2021	Best New Actress	Pawn	Nominated	
Director's Cut Awards	2022	Best New Actress in Film	Pawn	Nominated	
Golden Cinematography Awards	2021	Best Young Actress	Pawn	Won	
Golden Cinematography Awards	2023	Best Young Actress	Switch	Won	
SBS Drama Awards	2023	Best Young Actress	Revenant	Won	
Seoul Int'l Children's Film Festival	2022	Kid of the Year	Park So-yi	Won	
