= Top 40 (disambiguation) =

Top 40 may refer to:

- Top 40, the current, 40 most-popular songs in a particular genre. It is the best-selling or most frequently broadcast popular music.
- Top 40 (radio format), or Contemporary hit radio, also known as CHR, contemporary hits, hit list, current hits, hit music, top 40, or pop radio) is a radio format that focuses on playing current and recurrent popular music as determined by the top 40 music charts.
- Top 40 Hits, 1995 album by Anal Cunt
- Top 40 Music Magazine, English-language South African monthly music magazine published nationwide in print form between 1984 and 2002

== Country-specific Top 40s ==
- Dutch Top 40
- HR Top 40, the main Croatian domestic singles airplay chart
- Ö3 Austria Top 40, official Austrian singles chart
- The Official NZ Top 40, New Zealand singles chart
- UK Top 40 (TV series), charts-based programme which aired on Sundays on the CBBC channel from 2002 to 2005

== See also ==
- Adult Top 40, also known as Adult Pop Songs, a chart published weekly by Billboard magazine and ranks the most popular adult top 40 as based on radio airplay
- American Top 40 (commonly abbreviated to AT40), an internationally syndicated, independent song countdown radio program created by Casey Kasem, Don Bustany, Tom Rounds and Ron Jacobs
- Mainstream Top 40, called Pop Songs and sometimes referred to as Top 40/CHR, a 40-song music chart published weekly by Billboard Magazine which ranks the most popular songs being played on a panel of Top 40 radio stations in the United States
- Top 40 Tracks, a chart from Billboard magazine
- Rick Dees Weekly Top 40, an internationally syndicated radio program created and hosted by American radio personality Rick Dees

Disambiguations

- Top Ten (disambiguation)
