= Josephine Skriver =

Danish model (born 1993)

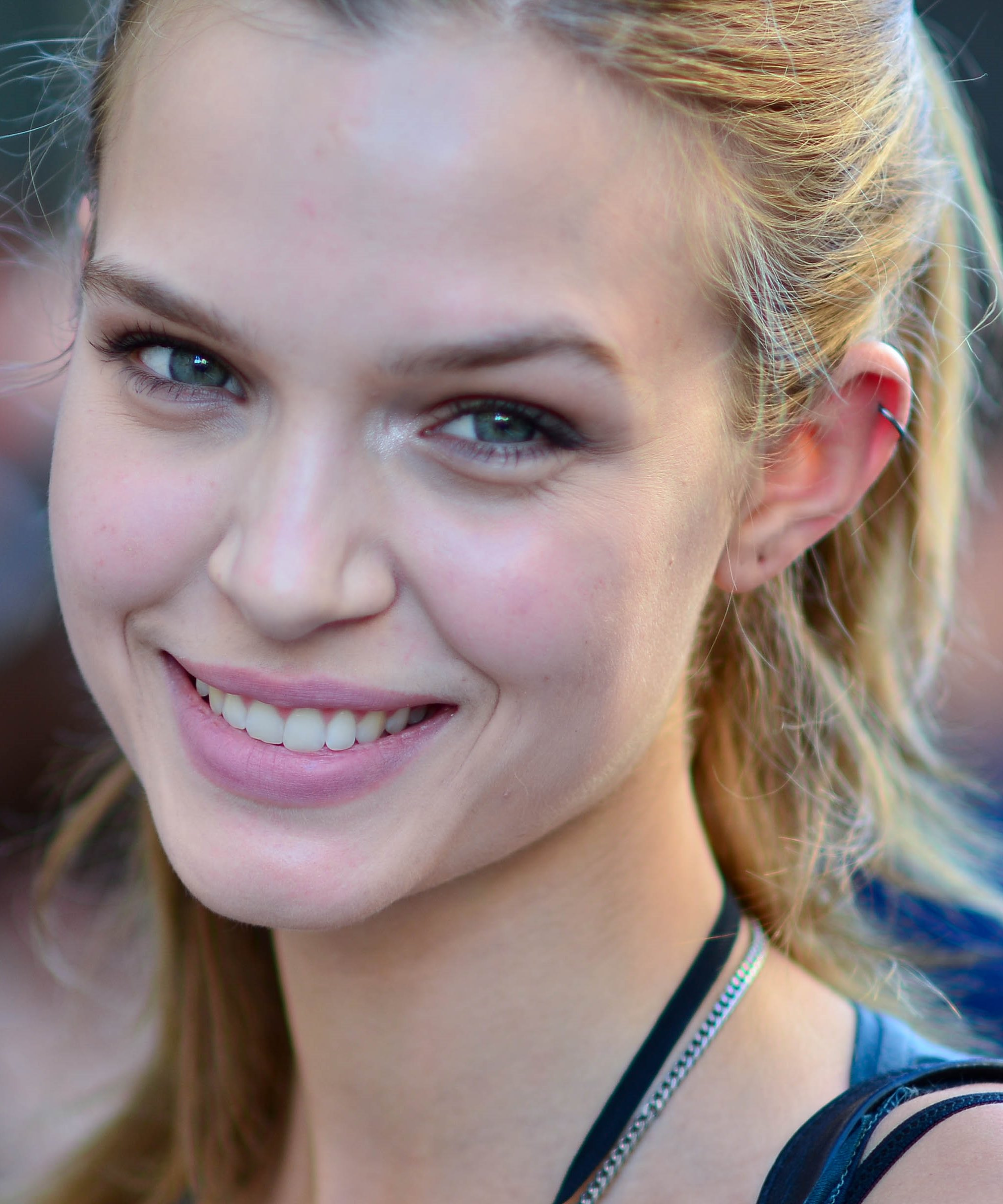
- Skriver in 2013
- Born: Josephine Skriver Karlsen; April 14, 1993 (age 33); Copenhagen, Denmark
- Occupation: Model
- Years active: 2009-present
- Spouse: Alexander DeLeon (m. 2022)
- Children: 1
- Modeling information
- Height: 5 ft 11 in (1.80 m)
- Hair color: Light Brown
- Eye color: Green
- Agency: IMG Models (New York); Elite Model Management (Paris, Milan); Storm Management (London); Traffic Models (Barcelona); Seeds Management GmbH (Berlin); Unique Models (Copenhagen); Model Management (Hamburg); Vivien's Model Management – Sydney (Sydney)

Josephine Skriver Karlsen (Danish: [jo̝səˈfiːnə ˈskʁiːˈwɐ]; born April 14, 1993) is a Danish model.

== Early life ==
Skriver was born and raised in Copenhagen, Denmark. Her mother is an information technology analyst, and her father is a marine biologist. Her mother is a lesbian, and her father is gay; Skriver and her younger brother, Oliver, were conceived through in vitro fertilisation.

At the age of 15, Skriver was discovered and approached about her modeling potential while on a trip to New York with her football team. Shortly thereafter, she was signed by Unique Models, an international modeling agency based in Copenhagen. She was consequently approached by other agencies outside of Denmark, but decided to wait to stay in school. After finishing school, she began pursuing a modeling career in 2011.

== Career ==
Skriver's debut season was Fall/Winter 2011, during which she opened for Alberta Ferretti and closed for Prada. That season, she also walked for many other prominent designers, like Calvin Klein, Rag & Bone, Gucci, Dolce & Gabbana, Givenchy, Yves Saint Laurent, Valentino, Alexander McQueen, Balenciaga, DKNY and Christian Dior.

Throughout her career, she has done advertisement campaigns for brands such as H&M, Dior, Gucci, Bulgari, DKNY, Michael Kors, Balmain, MAC Cosmetics, Armani Exchange, Karen Millen, Max Mara, Topten, Tommy Hilfiger, Yves Saint Laurent Beauty, Caleres, Tom Ford, Shu Uemura, Andrew Marc, G-Shock, Victoria's Secret and she has been on the cover of and featured in editorials of numerous magazines such as Marie Claire, Vanity Fair, V magazine, Interview, L'Officiel, Vs., W, Allure, Italian, German, Russian, Chinese, Japanese, Australian, Brazilian, Spanish and American Vogue as well as Danish, Italian, Brazilian, Swedish, French Elle and British, Polish, Mexican, Arabian, and American Harper's Bazaar, and more.

She has worked with Mario Testino for Michael Kors, Steven Meisel for Vogue Italia, Tim Walker for American Vogue, Greg Kadel for German Vogue, Terry Richardson for H&M and Patrick Demarchelier for Dior.

Skriver has appeared in catalogs and advertisements for Victoria's Secret and walked in the Victoria's Secret Fashion Show every consecutive year since 2013. In February 2016, it was announced that Skriver was officially one of the brand's contracted Angels, making her the first Danish Angel since Helena Christensen.

On January 22, 2020, Skriver was confirmed as the newest model for the 2020 Sports Illustrated Swimsuit Issue. She would win "Rookie of the Year" and return in 2021.

== LGBT advocacy ==
In 2015, Skriver was made a celebrity ambassador for the Family Equality Council and its Outspoken Generation Program, which aims to raise awareness about LGBTQ families.

She has said that her ultimate goal is that her story will "not be that interesting soon, because that would mean that society has come to accept LGBT parents to be just as traditional and normal as any other way of having a family."

== Personal life ==
Skriver has been in a relationship with American musician Alexander DeLeon since 2013; in November 2018, the couple announced their engagement. They married in April 2022 in Cabo San Lucas. As of 2022, they live together in Los Angeles. On May 9, 2023, Skriver and Deleon announced they were expecting their first child. On August 24, 2023, Skriver announced she gave birth to a girl.

She is a fan of Manchester United, the NHL's Nashville Predators and the NFL's Las Vegas Raiders.
