= List of 2020 box office number-one films in South Korea =

The following is a list of 2020 box office number-one films in South Korea. When the number-one film in gross is not the same as the number-one film in admissions, both are listed.

The box office dropped in February after the COVID-19 pandemic in South Korea. Some films were postponed.

== Number-one films ==
†	This implies the highest-grossing movie of the year.

#	Date	Film	Gross
1	January 5, 2020	Ashfall	US$4.1 million
2	January 12, 2020	Dolittle	US$5.1 million
3	January 19, 2020	Secret Zoo	US$4.1 million
4	January 26, 2020	The Man Standing Next †	US$15.1 million
5	February 2, 2020	The Man Standing Next †	US$3.7 million
6	February 9, 2020	The Closet	US$3.6 million
7	February 16, 2020	Honest Candidate	US$4.8 million
8	February 23, 2020	Beasts Clawing at Straws	US$1.7 million
9	March 1, 2020	The Invisible Man	US$0.8 million
10	March 8, 2020	The Invisible Man	US$0.6 million
11	March 15, 2020	The Invisible Man	US$0.4 million
12	March 22, 2020	The Invisible Man	US$0.3 million
13	March 29, 2020	Judy	US$0.2 million
14	April 5, 2020	Ip Man 4: The Finale	US$0.1 million
15	April 12, 2020	1917	US$0.1 million
16	April 19, 2020	La La Land	US$0.1 million
17	April 26, 2020	La La Land	US$0.1 million
18	May 3, 2020	Trolls World Tour	US$0.2 million
19	May 10, 2020	A Rainy Day in New York	US$0.3 million
20	May 17, 2020	Escape from Pretoria	US$0.2 million
21	May 24, 2020	The Greatest Showman	US$0.2 million
22	May 31, 2020	Underwater	US$0.3 million
23	June 7, 2020	Intruder	US$1.9 million
24	June 14, 2020	Innocence	US$1.9 million
25	June 21, 2020	Innocence	US$1.1 million
26	June 28, 2020	#Alive	US$5.3 million
27	July 5, 2020	#Alive	US$1.9 million
28	July 12, 2020	#Alive	US$1.0 million
29	July 19, 2020	Peninsula	US$9.2 million
30	July 26, 2020	Peninsula	US$4.5 million
31	August 2, 2020	Steel Rain 2: Summit	US$5.0 million
32	August 9, 2020	Deliver Us from Evil	US$10.6 million
33	August 16, 2020	Deliver Us from Evil	US$7.1 million
34	August 23, 2020	Deliver Us from Evil	US$1.5 million
35	August 30, 2020	Tenet	US$3.0 million
36	September 6, 2020	Tenet	US$1.9 million
37	September 13, 2020	Tenet	US$1.4 million
38	September 20, 2020	Tenet	US$1.0 million
39	September 27, 2020	Tenet	US$0.8 million
40	October 4, 2020	Pawn	US$4.0 million
41	October 11, 2020	Pawn	US$2.1 million
42	October 18, 2020	Voice of Silence	US$1.5 million
43	October 25, 2020	Samjin Company English Class	US$2.2 million
44	November 1, 2020	Samjin Company English Class	US$3.4 million
45	November 8, 2020	Collectors	US$3.7 million
46	November 15, 2020	Collectors	US$2.3 million
47	November 22, 2020	Collectors	US$1.3 million
48	November 29, 2020	Best Friend	US$1.0 million
49	December 6, 2020	Best Friend	US$0.5 million
50	December 13, 2020	Josée	US$0.5 million
51	December 20, 2020	Josée	US$0.3 million
52	December 27, 2020	Wonder Woman 1984	US$1.8 million

== See also ==
- List of South Korean films of 2020
