= Minod =

Minod is a given name. Notable people with the name include:

- Minod Bhanuka (born 1995), Sri Lankan cricketer
- Minod Moktan, Nepali human rights activist
