= Nepalis in South Korea =

People of Nepali origin settled in South Korea

Nepalese in South Korea
재한 네팔인 brhangug-e geojuhan nepal-in hito दक्षिण कोरियामा रहेका नेपालीहरु Dakṣiṇa kōriyāmā rahēkā nēpālīharu

Total population
- 70,015 (2013)

Regions with significant populations
- Uijeongbu · Ansan · Gimhae · Gwangju

Languages
- Korean · Maithili • Nepali • Newari • Magar

Religion
- Hinduism (Majority) · Buddhism · Christianity

Related ethnic groups
- Nepali diaspora

Nepalese in South Korea comprise Korean Citizens with Nepalese Descendents and Nepalese migrant workers, including temporary expatriates and permanent residents, as well as their locally born descendants of either Korean or Nepalese nationality. The Nepalese in South Korea are mainly of three distinct ethnic groups: Khas, Madhesis and Janjatis.

== Migration history ==
The first wave of Nepalese immigration began in the late 1980s. After Nepal restored its democracy in the 1990s, labour laws were changed to allow Nepalese youths to go abroad in search of work.

The Nepalese community in South Korea thus consists primarily of migrant workers, at present mainly who come from Employee Permit System (EPS) . The EPS system is a labor migration programme that operates through bilateral government-to-government memoranda of understanding (MOU). Among the eight South Asian countries, four countries: Bangladesh, Nepal, Pakistan, Sri Lanka have been sending workers to South Korea. Pakistan signed the MoU in 2006, Nepal signed MoU in 2007, Bangladesh, and Sri Lanka in 2008 making four out of eight South Asian countries to legally work in South Korea. These agreements committed each government to work with the Korean government to reduce the cost of overseas migration and improve the employment conditions of workers. But, there are also large numbers of students and Nepalese women married to South Korean men they met through international matchmaking agencies.

Also there are cooks who are specialised in Punjabi, Mughlai, Buhari, Rajasthani, Kashmiri, Gujarati, Anglo Indian and Nepali styles which are mainly North Indian and Nepalese - Tibetan. Some of them are hired by restaurants and hotels but others own and run their restaurants in Seoul, Busan, Daegu and other cities since Indian and Nepalese cuisine get popularity in Korea.

The Nepali government are attempting to induce Nepali workers staying illegally in South Korea (roughly 2,500 as of 2010) to return home, in hopes that the South Korean government will increase its intake of Nepali workers in future years.

=== Present-day context ===
The number of Nepalese in Korea is growing day by day. The total number of registered Nepalese living in Korea was around 35000 in 2015, which reached to almost 90,000 in 2025. The majority of Nepalese living in Korea are under E-9 visa (unskilld workers visa).

== Culture ==
The Nepalese community managed to keep their traditions alive while living in South Korea. Nepalese festivals such as Tihar, Dasain and Teej are celebrated throughout the country.

== Organisations ==
The Non-Resident Nepali Association of Korea is one organisation for Nepalese people living in South Korea. In 2010, they opened a shelter in Dongdaemun-gu, Seoul to provide charitable assistance for Nepalese who become unemployed or otherwise face difficulties. Another organisation, aimed specifically at international students, is the Society of Nepalese Students in Korea (SONSIK), established in 2004. South Korea's multilingual Migrant Workers' Television was founded by Nepali migrant worker Minod Moktan (Minu), a human rights activist who lived in South Korea for nearly 18 years before being deported in October 2009.

== See also ==
- Nepal–South Korea relations
- Nepalese diaspora
- Immigration to South Korea
- Koreans in Nepal
