= Pawn (2020 film) =

South Korean drama film

- Theatrical release poster
- Hangul: 담보
- RR: Dambo
- MR: Tambo
- Directed by: Kang Dae-gyu
- Written by: Yoon Je-kyoon
- Produced by: Yoon Je-kyoon
- Starring: Sung Dong-il; Ha Ji-won; Kim Hee-won; Park So-yi
- Cinematography: Yoon Joo-hwan
- Edited by: Yang Jin-mo
- Music by: Jeong Jin-ho
- Production companies: JK Film; Redrover Co Ltd; Film Company Youn
- Distributed by: CJ Entertainment
- Release date: September 29, 2020
- Running time: 113 minutes
- Country: South Korea
- Language: Korean
- Box office: US$13.6 million

Pawn (Korean: 담보; RR: Dambo; lit. 'Collateral') is a 2020 South Korean comedy drama film, directed by Kang Dae-gyu and produced by Yoon Je-kyoon. The film starring Sung Dong-il, Ha Ji-won, Kim Hee-won and Park So-yi, is a human drama which revolves around two debt collectors, Doo-seok (Sung Dong-il) and Jong-bae (Kim Hee-won), who take nine-year-old girl Seung-yi (Park So-yi) as "collateral" from her mother, an illegal immigrant.

The film was released in theaters on September 29, 2020. It received generally positive reviews and became the sixth-highest-grossing Korean film of 2020.

== Synopsis ==
In 1993, Doo-Seok (Sung Dong-il) and Jong-bae (Kim Hee-won) work as debt collectors in Incheon, South Korea. While collecting a debt from Myung-Ja (Yunjin Kim), they take her nine-year-old daughter Seung-Yi (Park So-Yi) as collateral. Myung-Ja is an illegal immigrant and she is deported from South Korea. Suddenly, Doo-Seok and Jong-bae become Seung-Yi's guardians. The two men and the girl eventually form a family-like bond as they live together.

== Cast ==
- Sung Dong-il as Doo-seok
- Ha Ji-won as Seung-yi
  - Park So-yi as young Seung-yi
  - Hong Seung-hee as teenage Seung-yi
- Kim Hee-won as Jong-bae
- Kim Jae-hwa as Madam Jeong
- Jin Yoo-young as Minister of state of the Republic of Korea
- Jung In-gi as Translator Noh
- Yoo Soon-woong as Byeong-dal
- Cha Chung-hwa as Byeong-dal's wife

Friendly appearance

- Yunjin Kim as Myung-ja
- Na Moon-hee as Seungi, grandmother

== Production ==
=== Casting ===
In March 2019, Sung Dong-il, Ha Ji-won and Yunjin Kim were cast in the film. The script reading was held in April 2019 in presence of Sung Dong-il, Ha Ji-won, Yunjin Kim, Kim Hee-won and child actor Park So-yi.

=== Filming ===
Principal photography began in Incheon on April 22, 2019. Filming wrapped up on July 31.

== Release ==
The film was screened at the opening gala of the London Korean Film Festival on October 29, 2020.

== Reception ==
=== Box office ===
The film was released on September 29, 2020 on 1342 screens and it has been topping the box office since September 30, according to the Korean Film Council (KOFIC). The film attracted an audience of 1.3 million nationwide as of October 12, 2020.

According to Korean Film Council data†, Pawn with gross of US$13.60 million and 1.72 million admissions, ranked at 8th place among all the Korean films released in the year 2020.

- †The system of KOBIS (Korean Box Office Information System) is managed by KOFIC.

Admissions Based on the Integrated Computer Network for Cinema Admission Tickets
As of	Cumulative admissions	Ref.
January 4, 2021	1,719,719 persons	

Admissions (persons) as of respective weekend date
Week ending	Admissions (cumulative)	BO rank
As of December 6, 2020	1,718,991	
As of November 29, 2020	1,717,763	
As of November 22, 2020	1,717,051	
As of November 15, 2020	1,714,518	
As of November 8, 2020	1,702,252	3rd
As of November 1, 2020	1,665,270	2nd
As of October 25, 2020	1,579,196	2nd
As of October 18, 2020	1,448,734	2nd
As of October 11, 2020	1,241,310	1st
As of October 4, 2020	821,475	1st

=== Critical response ===
Going by Korean review aggregator Naver Movie Database, the film holds an approval rating of 9.17 from the audience. William Schwartz reviewing Pawn for HanCinema said that the film has more cuteness than the plot. He criticized the dressing and demeanor of Doo-seok (played by Sung Dong-il) and Jong-bae (played by Kim Hee-won), in the beginning of the film. He opined that the film outshone because of chemistry between the lead actors. The film made people cry, even when editing technique of foreshadowing the plot was used. Further he praised the film for the message it conveyed about non-traditional families and the way period of 1993 was presented.

From September 30, the film, rose to No. 1 in the overall box office, and the real-time reservation rate rose to No. 1. In addition, the CGV Golden Egg Index, which reflects the satisfaction of actual visitors, rose 1% from the previous day to 96%. The Megabox rating was 9.1 points. The Lotte Cinema rating was 8.8 points, which was a high rating compared to films screened in theaters then. The portal site Naver's rating was also 9.48 points, up 0.15 points from the previous day.

== Awards and nominations ==
Year	Award ceremony	Category	Nominee(s)	Result	Ref.
2021	Chunsa Film Art Awards	Best New Actress	Park So-yi	Nominated	
2021	Golden Cinematography Awards	Best Young Actress	Park So-yi	Won	

== Remake ==
An Indonesian remake of the film, titled Call Me Dad (Indonesian: Panggil Aku Ayah), was released in Indonesian theatres on August 7, 2025. It stars Ringgo Agus Rahman, Boris Bokir, Tissa Biani, and Myesha Lin.
