= Switch (2023 film) =

2023 South Korean comedy film

- Theatrical release poster
- Hangul: 스위치
- RR: Seuwichi
- MR: Sŭwich'i
- Directed by: Ma Dae-yun
- Written by: Ma Dae-yun
- Produced by: Kim Won-guk
- Starring: Kwon Sang-woo; Oh Jung-se; Lee Min-jung; Park So-yi; Kim Joon
- Cinematography: Kim Il-yeon
- Edited by: Jeong Ji-eun
- Music by: Jo Seong-woo
- Production company: Hive Media Corp
- Distributed by: Lotte Entertainment
- Release date: January 4, 2023
- Running time: 112 minutes
- Country: South Korea
- Language: Korean
- Box office: US$3.1 million

Switch (Korean: 스위치) is a 2023 South Korean comedy film written and directed by Ma Dae-yun. Starring Kwon Sang-woo, Oh Jung-se, and Lee Min-jung, it follows Park Kang, a top star who enjoys a splendid single life, and faces a moment when his life changes 180 degrees when he meets a taxi driver on Christmas Eve. The film was released theatrically in South Korea on January 4, 2023.

== Plot ==
Park Kang is a top-tier actor and scandal magnet who seems to have it all, with fame, fortune, and a glamorous single life. On Christmas Eve, however, his glittering existence feels empty as he finds himself holding nothing but an end-of-year trophy.

After a night of drinking with his only friend and loyal manager Jo Yoon, Park Kang wakes up in a strange house surrounded by two unfamiliar children and his first love Soo-hyun, whom he left behind for success. Adding to the confusion, Jo Yoon is now a superstar, taking over the celebrity spotlight that used to be his.

As his life spins out of control, Park Kang begins to recall a strange remark from the taxi driver the night before, prompting him to question the choices that led him here. Faced with an entirely new reality, he must confront his past and find a way forward in a world turned upside down.

== Cast ==
- Kwon Sang-woo as Park Kang
- Oh Jung-se as Jo Yoon
- Lee Min-jung as Gong Soo-hyun
- Park So-yi as Park Ro-hee
- Kim Joon as Park Ro-ha
- Kim Mi-kyung as Park Kang's mother
- Cha Hee as Woo Hee
- Yoo Jae-myung as Park Dong-baek
- Hwang Seung-eon as Lee Hwa-young
- Kim Ha-young as bride

== Production ==
Switch marks the comeback of Lee Min-jung in films, her last appearance was in rom-com Wonderful Radio (2012). Principal photography began on January 17, 2021, and was wrapped up on March 29, 2021.

== Release ==
On November 16, 2022, the distribution company Lotte Entertainment released the first multiverse poster and trailer, announcing the title of the film as Switch, which was previously known as "The Christmas Present" (크리스마스 선물, keuriseumaseu seonmul). On December 5, 2022 it was announced that the film will premiere on January 4, 2023.

On January 3, 2022 a special money-back guarantee screening of the film was held. A full refund of the admission fee was offered to the audience in case they were dissatisfied with the film and presented the ticket at the box office within 20 minutes after the screening of the film.

== Reception ==
The film released on January 4, 2023, on 912 screens. It opened at 5th place with 30,513 admissions at the Korean box office.

As of December 31, 2023, with gross of US$3,050,961 and 422,417 admissions, it is at 24th place in the Korean films released in 2023.

=== Critical response ===
Choi Jeong-ah reviewing for Sports World praised the performance of Kwon Sang-woo writing, "Kwon Sang-woo's calm and restrained acting in the second half of the play stimulates the audience's tear glands". Choi concluding, opined, "It is an above-average work in all aspects of acting and directing, fun and emotion, message and sound." Kim Yu-jin reviewing for Xports News praised the performance of the cast. Kim appreciating acting of Park So-yi and Kim Joon wrote, "Child actors Park So-yi and Kim Joon's performance are a vital force that disarms the entire generation." Kim quoted director Ma Dae-yun's contention that "it's a movie that's good to watch with your family and is like a gift."
