= Jeong Yeong-wung =

South Korean voice actor

- Born: Jeong Yeong Wung; June 19, 1979; Seoul, South Korea
- Years active: 2004–present

Jeong Yeong-wung (born June 19, 1979) is an EBS voice actor.

== Role ==
- Kotencotenco - Great Demon King
- Death Note - Prisoner, Mafia, Teacher
- Inspector Gadget (1983) - Dr. Claw, MAD Agent, Grappler, Spuds Marlone
- Inspector Gadget (2015) - Dr. Claw
- Gantz - Yoshioka
- Engine Sentai Go-onger - Engine Banki, Rairaiken, Engine Dai-Shogun, Teacher
- Robot Power
- Digimon Data Squad - Sarbleomon, Ikkakumon
- Fairy Tail - Wally Buchanan
- The Amazing Adrenalini Brothers
- Transformers: Prime - Bulkhead, Vehicons, Insecticon
- Garfield's Fun Fest - Eli, Junior Bear
- Doraemon: Nobita's New Great Adventure into the Underworld - The Seven Magic Users - Great Demon King
- Kimba the White Lion - Goda, Skunk, Animals, People
- One Piece - Edward Weevil
- Mobile Suit Gundam AGE - Stoller Guavaran
- Case Closed - Gin, Saeki (Animax), Hitoshi Komatsu (Tooniverse)
- Star Wars Rebels - Garazeb Orrelios
- Nana - Okazaki, Yamagishi
- The Kindaichi Case Files - Mikoto Wajima, Shimon Madarame
- GR: Giant Robo - Katsumi Arashi
- Eyeshield 21
- Zatch Bell! - Gangster, Rembrant
- Regal Academy - Campus Dragon, Beast Coach
- Hunter × Hunter OVA - Series 3: G.I. Final - True Bisuke
- Robocar Poli - Max, Spooky
- Bunnicula - Harold
- Noonbory and the Super Seven - Rosygury, Coldygury
- Hoodwinked 2: Hood vs. Evil - Giant
- Wander Over Yonder - Giant Worm
- Black Jack 21 - Dr. Cuma
- Open Season 2 - Ian, Rufus, Reilly
- Super Wings - Paul
- Mini Force
- Mini Force: New Heroes Rise
- Mini Force X - Dancho
- Chuggington - Harrison, M'tambo
- Power Battle Watchcar - Maru, Mac
- Power Battle Watchcar: The Counterattack of Watch Mask - Maru, Mac
- Tom and Jerry Tales - King, Butch
- The Secret of the Sword - Cringer, Battlecat
- Deko Boko Friends - Big Oggo
- Naughty Nuts - Krust
- Tayo the Little Bus - Big, Sky
- Mune: Guardian of the Moon - Leeyoon, Krrrack
- Olobob Top - Narrator
- The Mr. Men Show - Mr. Strong, Mr. Scatterbrain, Mr. Nosy
- Cocomong - Potato-pow
- Trollhunters - AAARRRGGHH!!!
- The Angry Birds Movie - Bomb
- Uchu Sentai Kyuranger - Champ/Oushi Black

== Games ==
- StarCraft: Remastered - Cerebrate
- StarCraft II: Wings of Liberty - Marauder, Gabriel Tosh
- Cyphers - Leyton
- Dota 2 - Tidehunter
- Blade & Soul
- Elsword - Shadow Master, Avalanche, Joaquin, Ifritan, Ska, Meson
- Dungeon Fighter Online - Don Enzo Sipo
- World of Warcraft
- Hearthstone
- Karma Returns
- Kurtzpel
