= Super Wings =

South Korean children's TV series

- Genre: Children's television; Educational; Preschool; Action; Adventure; Mecha; Comedy
- Created by: Gil Hoon Jung
- Written by: Anne D. Bernstein; Young Woo Kim; Jung Jin Hong; Pammy Salmon
- Directed by: Jin Yong Kim
- Voices of: English version: Luca Padovan; J. L. Mount; Junah Jang; Colin Critchley; Gary Littman; Emma Fusco; Evan Smolin
- Composer: Seung Hyuk Yang (for Studio Doma)
- Countries of origin: South Korea; China; United States
- Original languages: Korean; Mandarin; English
- No. of seasons: 10
- No. of episodes: 424 (list of episodes)

Production
- Executive producers: Young Hong Jeong (seasons 1–3); Jisoo Han; Sang Ho Han; Chan Kyung Jung; Ray Wang; Jay Woong Um; Josh Selig (seasons 1–2); Issac Hin; So Jin An
- Producers: Do Uk Kim; Jung Jin Hong; Yong Jun Lee; Seong Su Kim (season 1); Jonghyuk (Dane) Lee (season 1); Nae Young Kwak (season 1); Doo Ri Park (season 1); Fred Weinberg (season 1); Nicole Toree (season 2); Heaven Lee (season 3); Kyung Eun Koo (seasons 3–present); Sangku Son (seasons 3–present); Mim Joo Yang
- Editor: Do Uk Kim
- Running time: 12 minutes
- Production companies: FunnyFlux Entertainment; Qianqi Animation (season 1); Alpha Group (seasons 2–present); Little Airplane Productions (seasons 1–2); Educational Broadcasting System

Original release
- Network: EBS (South Korea); Syndication (Mainland China); Universal Kids (seasons 1–4; United States)
- Release: September 1, 2014 – present

Super Wings

Chinese name
- Traditional Chinese: 超級飛俠
- Simplified Chinese: 超级飞侠
Transcriptions
Standard Mandarin
- Hanyu Pinyin: Chāojí fēi xiá

Korean name
- Hangul: 출동! 슈퍼윙스
Transcriptions
- Revised Romanization: Chuldong! Syupeo Wingseu

Super Wings (Korean: 출동! 슈퍼윙스; RR: Chuldong! Syupeowingseu; lit. 'Go! Super Wings'; Chinese: 超级飞侠; pinyin: Chāojí fēi xiá) is an animated television series created by Gil Hoon Jung and produced by his company, FunnyFlux Entertainment, in South Korea. It is made in association with Alpha Group Co., Ltd. from China with production support from the Educational Broadcasting System in South Korea and additional support from the KOCCA, and premiered on EBS in South Korea on September 1, 2014.

== Overview ==
The series follows a basic format where Jett, a talking plane, interacts with other Super Wings either at the World Airport (seasons 1–3), World Aircraft (seasons 4–7), or World Spaceport (seasons 8–present) before being called to a delivery. Then Jimbo or Sky gives Jett some facts about the location he is being sent to and the local language. Using this knowledge, he interacts with the kid or kids ordering the packages. When a problem inevitably occurs, Jett calls for help from one or more of the Super Wings. They join up and together solve the problem.

The format remained relevant in Season 2, though the interaction segments were dropped. Jimbo also no longer works at World Airport during this season and is replaced by his niece Sky while he takes an around-the-world vacation (though he still makes cameos in the locations where Jett makes his deliveries). The assisting format was also altered, as typically more than one Super Wing ends up with Jett at the end of the episode.

Season 3 brings the interaction segment back and sees Jimbo return as a maintenance technician. The rest of the format remains in place from Season 2, though the assistance method changes once again. Jett now receives help from a specialized team of Super Wings, rather than from a random selection. The episode count also dropped from 52 to 40.

Major changes came in Season 4, with much of the show now taking place on World Aircraft, a giant plane functioning as a mobile airport (with Jimbo as captain and Sky as communications officer). The kids now actually call the Super Wings to make specialized products (manufactured by Storm, a new character and World Aircraft's chief engineer), to be shipped in metal box-like containers rather than in cardboard boxes in past seasons. Jett now has a regular travel buddy and Rescue Rider talking dragon for deliveries, and they are instead given upgrades by way of a Super Charge beam rather than receiving help, although other Super Wings and dragons show up randomly in some episodes. The number of episodes remained at 40.

Season 5 is like Season 4, as the Super Wings are still in the World Aircraft (with Jimbo, Sky, and Storm in the same positions). This season the Super Wings have new companions: Super Pets, small creatures resembling Super Wings that can transform into all kinds of things for missions. They also have to face Golden Boy (a golden plane that can transform and use its arms like rockets), who appears regularly in episodes to prevent the Super Wings from trying to carry out their missions. Unlike in Season 4, Jett no longer calls Super Charge mode but rather Super Helps, a team made up of a Super Wing and its corresponding Super Pet.

Season 6 brings a new format of missions for the Super Wings squad: they are now a team called World Guardians and the Super Pets are no longer used in missions (they are now in the control room with Sky and Storm, while Jimbo is absent) and the Super Charge mode is replaced by the Super Balls (a new type of item that contain elemental powers like wind, fire, polar, water, animal or lightning). Kids that Jett brings a pack can also join them, calling themselves the World Guardians Buddies. One of the major novelties of this season is the World Aircraft transforming into a giant robot called "World Robot", which is used when situations or problems may have become too complicated. Golden Boy is still around this season and has a new accomplice called Golden Wheels. Furthermore, they are not shy about making things worse on the World Guardians missions.

In Season 7 the largest change was that the Super Pets are on vacation around the world. When they arrive at a new place the Super Pets cause some trouble, and call the World Aircraft carrier to ask for a package from Jett. As in Season 4, Jett goes with a traveling companion. In case the Super wings and Super Pets are in trouble, they are Super Charged to solve the problems caused by Golden Boy, who now has a golden Super Pet.

Season 8 introduces new changes for the Super Wings: After a giant plane station, they have now a space base named World Spaceport and introduces new members. The Super Wings works now with electric energy that gives them new special abilities, but beware for a major use or they will be without power. In this season, Golden Boy is still present and is now in company of his younger cousin Golden Girl, who causes so many mayhems as him with her Nano-wand.

== Characters ==
=== Main ===
- Jett (호기; Hogi; Chinese: 乐迪, Lèdí; voiced by Moon Nam-sook in the Korean version, Luca Padovan (Season 1), Hudson Loverro (Season 2 and Season 5), Chasden Gilson-Walker (Season 3 - Season 4), Winston Bromhead (Season 5), Finn Egan-Liang (Season 6), Henry Bolan (Season 7 - Season 9) and Tytan Kunaseharan (Season 10 - present) in the English version) is the main protagonist, a red and white male jet plane. His task is to deliver packages to kids around the world. Jett is the fastest aircraft in the world, full of energy and confidence, and is friendly with everyone at the international airport. He likes to fly around the world to help children deliver packages. Whenever difficulty arises, which is often because Jett is naïve or incompetent, he calls his best friends the "Super Wings" to help. Jett's original power was solely Jett Speed, though as the show progressed, he became able to adapt to any environment and also gained competency. In Season 5, Jett has a new Super Pet, Mini Jett/Jett Pet. At the end of the first two-part special of Season 6, he became a Legendary Super Wing and entered the Hall of Fame. In season 8, he was upgraded.
- Dizzy (아리; Ari; Chinese: 小爱, Xiǎo ài; voiced by Jang Eun-suk in the Korean version and Junah Jang (Season 1), Jenna Iacono (Season 2), Mikee Castillo (Season 3), Sofia Vernon (Season 4-5), Darby Schlosser, Mary Morgan (Season 6), Malea Cea (Season 7 - Season 9) and Emily Cooper (Season 10 - present) in the English dub) is a pink and white female rescue helicopter whose main task is to rescue people in need of her help. She is equipped with rescue ropes and emergency equipment. As long as Jett is in a critical situation and needs help, Dizzy will be dispatched immediately, because they are best partners. In Season 3, she is the leader of the Rescue Riders (formed by herself and her two siblings, Zoey (an ambulance) and Sparky (a fire truck)). In Season 5, Dizzy has a new Super Pet, Mini Dizzy/Dizzy Pet. In season 8, She was upgraded.
- Donnie (도니; Chinese: 多多, Duōduō; voiced by Soyoung Hong in the Korean version and Colin Critchley (Season 1-2), Owen Rivera-Babbey (Season 3), Braylyx Rivera-Babbey (Season 4-5), Smith Johnson (Season 6), Levi Wright (Season 7-9) and Charlie Cervini (Season 10) in the English version) is a male yellow and blue plane, which many commonly mistake as yellow, with the specialty to make or repair things with his handy tool kit. He is prone to self-inflicted accidents due to his clumsiness. Donnie is based upon a Canadair CL-415, but in a cartoony version. Donnie is an excellent engineer and a superhero, always meeting the possibilities of infinity in the best condition. He is a good and trustworthy partner with a powerful toolbox that always helps other Super Wings at critical moments. Although Donnie is smart, he always likes to make things that make people laugh and cry. In Season 3, he becomes the leader of the Build-It Buddies (formed by himself and his two siblings, Remi (a mixing truck) and Scoop (an excavator)). In Season 5, he is followed by his new Super Pet, Mini Donnie/Donnie Pet. He was written off as main character in Season 8, but still appeared in one episode called "Battle of the Builders". He returned again and reunited with the other Super Wings in the Season 9 Episodes "Stop the Space Monster" and "The Story of Jimbo's Wedding". He was returned as a main character in Season 10.
- Jerome (재롬; Chinese: 酷飞, Kùfēi; voiced by Jeon Tae-yeol in the Korean version and Evan Smolin (Season 1), David Gray (Season 2-4) and Lucas Way (Season 7) in the English version) is a male blue fighter jet based on a McDonnell Douglas F/A-18 Hornet from the Blue Angels aerobatic team. He believes that some problems Jett faces can be solved with a dance routine, and thinks he can do other Super Wings' missions better than they can. He was written off as a main character in Season 3, becoming the leader of Team Jerome which is formed by himself and his two siblings, Arome and Jerry (two other fighter jets, who did not transform) as a competition stunt team. Despite him being removed from the main cast, the theme song erroneously still features Jerome's name in the lyrics, while Paul has now been seen in the slot since Season 4. He was absent in Season 5 and Season 6 but returned in Season 7. In Season 7, Jerome is followed by his new Super Pet, Mini Jerome/Jerome Pet. He was written off again in Season 8, but returned and reunited with the other Super Wings in the Season 9 Episodes "Stop the Space Monster" and "The Story of Jimbo's Wedding".
- Paul (봉반장; Bong banjang; Chinese: 包警长, Bāo Jǐngzhǎng; voiced by Jeong Yeong-wung in the Korean version and Gary Littman (Season 1-2), Brad Venable (Season 3-4), Doug Erholtz (Season 5), Joey Nasser (Season 6), Nicholas Porteous (Season 7 - Season 9) and Chris Harris (Season 10 - present) in the English version) is a blue and white police plane. One of his jobs is to guard the World Airport at night. At times, he helps Jett and others by using his traffic control and detective skills. Paul is originally strict, but fun-loving; as the show progressed, however, he loosens up and replaces Jerome as the Super Wings dancing expert. In Season 3, he is the leader of the Police Patrol. In Season 5, Paul has a new Super Pet, Mini Paul/Paul Pet. He was written off in Season, but returned and reunited with the other Super Wings in the Season 9 Episodes "Stop the Space Monster" and "The Story of Jimbo's Wedding". He was returned as main character in Season 10.
- Grand Albert (다알지 할아버지; Daalji harabeoji; Chinese: 胡须爷爷, Húxū yéyé; voiced by Lim Chae-heon in the Korean version and Bill Raymond in the English version) is a retired male orange biplane with a front propeller based on a Grumman F2F. He gives Jett moral advice about some tasks. He also has a trunk full of items collected over time from his younger days as an adventurer, the most prominent being the telephoto transporter, a camera that can change the size of whatever is photographed. Like Jerome, he was written off as a main character in Season 3, but he still makes cameos in subsequent seasons. He was absent in Season 5 but returned in Season 6. He also made an appearance in Season 7. He returned and reunited with the other Super Wings in the Season 9 Episodes "Stop the Space Monster" and "The Story of Jimbo's Wedding".
- Mira (미나; Mina; Chinese: 小青, Xiǎoqīng; voiced by Mi-ra Jeong (Season 1-2), Jeong Hye-ok (Season 3-4) in the Korean version and Elana Caceres (Season 1-2) , Cassie Glow (Season 3-4) and Quinn Furlong (Season 9) in the English version, is a female green jet plane. She is the only member of the Super Wings team who loves water and can breathe underwater without diving equipment (up until Chase's introduction and Jett's upgrades in Season 3). In Season 3, she is the leader of the Wild Team. She was written off in Season 5 but made a return with Wily and Swampy in episode "Guardian of the Sea" in Season 8 and "Kings of the Ocean" in Season 9. Additionally, she returned and reunited with the other Super Wings in the Season 9 Episodes "Stop the Space Monster" and "The Story of Jimbo's Wedding".
- Bello (주주; Juju; Chinese: 卡文, Carvin (Kǎ wén); voiced by Lim Chae-heon in the Korean version and Jason Griffith in the English version) is a male black and white striped safari plane with a propeller. His specialty is to talk with various animals in their language. He was written off in Season 3.
- Jimbo (코보; kobo, Chinese: 金宝, Jīnbǎo; voiced by Um Sang-hyun in Korean, Voiced by J.L. Mount (former) and Tim Langton in English) is the former main traffic controller and the only human working at the World Airport in Season 1. In Season 2, he goes on an around-the-world vacation while his niece Sky, takes his place as air traffic controller, though he does make cameos in Jett's delivery destinations. In Season 3 he returns, this time as the Maintenance Technician, before becoming the Captain Commander of World Aircraft, the new base for the Super Wings from Season 4-Season 5. He was written off in Season 6, but returned in Season 8 as Trainer in Episodes "Super Wings Checkup Day" and "Alice in Pixel-Land". In Season 9, he returned once more and reunited with Sky, Strom and the other Super Wings.
- Chase (에이스; Eiseu; Chinese: 酷雷, Kùléi; voiced by Nam Doh-hyeong in the Korean version and Will Blagrove in the English version) is a male dark blue spy plane, first appearing in Season 2. He can transform into almost anything in addition to a robot and a plane. He was written off in Season 3.
- Todd (두두; Dudu; Chinese: 金刚, Jīngāng; voiced by Nam Doh-hyeong in the Korean version and Joseph Ricci in the English version) is a male brown construction plane who first appeared in Season 2. He has a drill for his nose. He was written off in Season 3.
- Astra (샛별; Saetbyeol; Chinese: 米莉, Millie (Mǐ lì); voiced by Soyoung Lee in the Korean version and Hayley Negrin (Season 2), Grace Lu (Season 3-5) and Courtney Chu (Season 6) and Julia Raza (Season 7) in the English version, is a female white space plane, first appearing in Season 2. She is an expert on missions that involve outer space and is the leader of the Galaxy Wings. Astra has a twin brother, Astro, who appeared in Season 3-Season 5. She is the only Season 2 character to appear in the following seasons. Astra is followed by her new Super Pet in Season 5, Mini Astra/Astra Pet. She was written off in Season 8 but returned and reunited with the other Super Wings in the Season 9 Episodes "Stop the Space Monster" and "The Story of Jimbo's Wedding". She was returned as main character in Season 10.
- Flip (피구; Pigu; Chinese: 淘淘, Táotáo; voiced by Jeon Hae-li in the Korean version and Jian Harrell in the English version) is a male red plane. He first appeared in Season 2 as someone who knows a lot about sports. He joined the Super Wings in "The Bermuda Blunder" after helping rescue Jett from the Bermuda Triangle. He was written off in Season 3.
- Sky (하늘; Haneul; Chinese: 安琪, Angie (Ān qí); voiced by Kim Eun-ah in the Korean version and Madison Kelly (Season 2), Cristina Milizia (Season 3), Cassandra Lee Morris (Season 4-6) Makeda Broomfield (Season 7), Jessie Tang (Season 8-Present) in the English version) is the current main traffic controller and the only human working at the World Airport after Jimbo went on vacation (until his return in Season 3). She is Jimbo's niece. Her first appearance was in Season 2. In Season 4, she is the new communications officer of World Aircraft and gets around on a hoverboard. As of Season 6, Sky takes over as the Captain Commander of World Aircraft since Jimbo is absent in that season and the subsequent one.
- Storm (우주; Uju; Chinese: 小风, Xiǎo fēng, voiced by Chae-ha Kim in the Korean version, Travis Burnett (Season 4-5), Charlize Tuozzo (Season 6), Christina Way (Season 7) and Christina Leonard (Season 8) in the English version) is a young boy introduced in Season 4 and the chief engineer of World Aircraft. He gets around with a jetpack.
- Roy (꽁지; Kkongji; Chinese: 皮皮, Pippi (Pí pí); voiced by Emma Fusco (Season 1 - 2) and Justin Pelovello (Season 3 - 5) in the English version) is a luggage tug. He is always wanting to fly, like the Super Wings. He often drops some items on the tarmac because he is in such a hurry. He has a twin brother named Ray. He was written off in Season 6, but reappeared in the Season 9 Episode "Roy the Space Train".
- Poppa Wheels (파파트럭, Papa Truck; Chinese: 卡尔, Carl (Kǎ'ěr); voiced by Benjie Randall in the English version) is a male orange truck who works as Donnie's Assistant and transforms into robot mode. He first appeared in Season 2 and acts as a father figure towards Donnie. He was written off in Season 3.
- Big Wing (빅윙; Chinese: 大鹏, Dà péng; voiced by Jeong Yeong-wung in the Korean version and Conor Hall in the English version) is a blue and white jumbo passenger plane with a yellow stripe. He is the biggest member of the Super Wings team and is the only member that does not transform into robot mode. He was absent in Season 4, Season 5, and Season 6, but returned in Season 7 and Season 9. In the Season 3 episode “The Case of the Lost Suitcase”, a large airplane similar to Big Wing appears, though it is unclear if that was him.
- Neo (네오; Chinese: 圆圆, Yuán yuán; voiced by Catie Harvey in the English version) is a small plane colored yellow and black, first appearing in Season 2 in Episode "Very Special Delivery". They work at a factory that transforms. Neo was absent during Season 4 and they were written off in Season 5.
- Zoey (조이; Chinese: 小柔, Xiǎo róu; voiced by Kim Eu-nah in the Korean version and Alisha Liston in the English version) is a female pink and white ambulance who is part of the Rescue Riders. First appearing in Season 3, she was written off in Season 5.
- Sparky (로키, Rocky; Chinese: 大勇, Dàyǒng; voiced by Jeon Tae-yeol in the Korean version. Nathan Blaiwes (Season 3) and Lucas Way (Season 7) in the English version) is a male fire engine who is part of both the Rescue Riders and the Super Wings Big Team. His first appearance was in Season 3. He was written off in Season 8, but returned and reunited with Super wings members in the Season 9 Episode "Stop the Space Monster".
- Remi (레미; Chinese: 雷米; voiced by Bak Sin-hee in the Korean version and Camille Schurer in the English version) is a female mixing truck with interchangeable bed parts, who is a part of the Build-It Buddies. Her first appearance is in Season 3. She and Scoop are Donnie's siblings. She is also a member of the Super Wings Big Team. She was written off in Season 6 and returned in the Season 8 Episode "Battle of the Builders".
- Scoop (포키; Poki; Chinese: 朗朗, Lǎnglǎng; voiced by Nam Doh-hyeong in the Korean version and Brysen Rush in the English version) is a male excavator with alternate crane parts, who is a part of the Build-It Buddies. He and Remi are Donnie's siblings. He was written off in Season 5.
- Astro (한별; Hanbyeol; Chinese: 米克, Mick (Mǐ kè); voiced by Tex Hammond (Season 3 - 4) and Porter Fasullo (Season 5) in the English version) is a male white space plane, first appearing in Season 3. He is Astra's twin brother, who is a part of the Galaxy Wings. He was written off in Season 6.
- Rover (로버; Robeo; Chinese: 流浪者, Liúlàng zhě; voiced by Isaiah Russell-Bailey (Season 3 - 5), Mary Morgan (Season 6) and Benjamin Sivcevic (Season 8) in the English version) is a male white moon rover who is a part of both the Galaxy Wings and the Super Wings Big Team. He first appeared in Season 3 and later appeared in some episodes of Season 4, 5, 6, and 8.
- Willie (해리; Haeri; Chinese: 威利, Wēi lì; voiced by Jalen K. Cassell in the English version) is a male green intermodal submarine capable of traveling on land. His first appearance is in Season 3. He is part of the Wild Team and the Super Wings Big Team. He was absent in Season 5, but returned in Season 6 and was written off in Season 7. In the Season 8 episode “Guardian of the Sea”, he made a return with Mira and Swampy.
- Swampy (누피; Nupi; Chinese: 沼澤的, Zhǎozé de; voiced by Dashiel Berk in the English version) is a male green fan boat, first appeared in Season 3. He is part of the Wild Team. He was written off in Season 5, but made a return with Mira and Willie in the episodes "Guardian of the Sea" in Season 8 and "Kings of the Ocean" in Season 9.
- Kim (김순경; Gim Sungyeong; Chinese: 贝警员, Officer Bay (Bèi jǐng yuán); voiced by Jeong Hye-ok in the Korean version and Araceli Prasarttongosoth in the English version) is a female police car. She first appeared in Season 3 and is part of the Police Patrol. She was written off in Season 5.
- Badge (배형사; Bae hyeongsa; Chinese: 徽章, Huīzhāng; voiced by Um Sang-hyun in the Korean version and Armen Taylor in the English version) is a tiltrotor police plane who is a part of the Police Patrol. Unlike Paul, he does not transform. He is also a member of the Super Wings Big Team. First appearing in Season 3, he was written off in Season 6.
- Arome (아롬; Arom; Chinese: 羅馬姐妹, Luómǎ jiěmèi) is a female fighter jet who is part of Team Jerome. She first appeared in Season 3 in Episode "Abu Dhabi Thunder". She is Jerome's sister. Unlike Jerome, she and Jerry did not transform. She was written off in Season 4.
- Jerry (재리; Jaeri; Chinese: 傑瑞, Jié ruì) is another male fighter jet who is part of Team Jerome. He first appeared in Season 3 Episode "Abu Dhabi Thunder". He is Jerome's brother. Unlike Jerome, he and Arome did not transform. He was written off in Season 4.
- Crystal (보라; Bora; Chinese: 雪儿, Cher (Xuě er), voiced by Emily Cota (in the English version) is a purple female furry plane who does not belong to a team. She helps people in blizzards and ice storms. She first appeared in Season 4 and made a small cameo in Season 5-6. She returned and reunited with the other Super Wings in the Season 9 Episodes "Stop the Space Monster" and "The Story of Jimbo's Wedding".
- Bucky (버키; Beoki; Chinese: 巴奇, Bā qí Voiced by Nour Jude Assaf (Season 4 - 5) and Ryan Chi Wai Li (Season 10) in English version) is an orange and yellow male Bumblebee plane capable of shrinking. He is the Super Wings insect expert and deals with problems that require being small. His first appearance is in Season 4. He was written off in Season 6, and returned in Season 10.
- Sunny (써니; Sseoni; Chinese: 佩佩, Pèi pèi Voiced by Luna Zamora in English version) is an orange and white female plane. She loves singing and dancing and has a little companion Super Pet named Mini Sunny/Sunny Pet. She first appeared in Season 5. She was written off in Season 6 but returned and reunited with Super Wings members in the Season 9 episodes "Stop the Space Monster" and "The Story of Jimbo's Wedding".
- Leo (레오; Chinese: 雷克, Lake (Léi kè) Voiced by Brysen Rush in English Version) is a blue flying car. Like Flip in Season 2, he joined the Super Wings when Jimbo offered him the opportunity to join. His first appearance is in Season 5. He has a Super Pet named Mini Leo/Leo Pet. He was written off in Season 6.
- The Super Pets (슈퍼펫; Syupeopet; Chinese: 超级宠物, Chāojí chongwù): Also known as Super Minis. The seven Super Pets are the new companions of the Super Wings, first appearing in Season 5. They can transform into various objects like a glove, rescue pillow, shield, crasher, holo-rope, or speaker. They are cute and playful with the Super Wings. The current Super Pets' names are Jett Pet, Dizzy Pet, Donnie Pet, Paul Pet, Astra Pet, Shine Pet, Tino Pet, Ellie Pet, Jerome Pet, and Golden Pet. There were two Super Pets that appeared in Season 5 only: Leo Pet and Sunny Pet. Three Super Pets appeared in Season 5 only: Donnie Pet, Paul Pet, and Astra Pet. They're written off in Season 8 but return in the Season 9 episodes "Stop the Space Monster" and "The Story of Jimbo's Wedding".
- Lime (라임; Raim; Chinese: 糯糯, Nuò nuò Voiced by Lily Tamburo in English version) is a light blue Super Wings with a chef's hat and a portable kitchen. She first appeared in Season 6 and is the new cook chef in the Super Wings Team's World Guardians. She was written off in Season 7 but returned and reunited with the other Super Wings in the Season 9 episodes "Stop the Space Monster" and "The Story of Jimbo's Wedding".
- Tony (토니; Toni; Chinese: 咚咚, Dōng dōng Voiced by Benjamin Pajak in English version) is a blue train with orange stripes, the first member of the Super Wings to be a train. His first appearance is in Season 6. He can also transform. He was written off in Season 7 but returned and reunited with the other Super Wings in the Season 9 episode "The Story of Jimbo's Wedding".
- Tino (티노; Tino; Chinese: 大壮, Dà zhuàng Voiced by Jeredyn Cross (Season 6), Mike Cosh (Season 7) and Nicholas Porteous (Season 8) in English version) is a blue-green Super Wings with transforming abilities. Examples include transforming into a plane, a dinosaur, and changing sizes. Tino is also a Legendary Super Wing. He first appeared in Season 6. In Season 7, he gets a new Super Pet introduced in the two-part special "Denmark Dinosaur."
- Ellie (알리; Chinese: 巧巧 Voiced by Lulu McGrinder) is a pink stunt plane and the granddaughter of Grand Albert. She is a Super Wings explorer who loves adventures and exploring new locations. Like Grand Albert, she has a suitcase of objects and telephoto in a smartphone appearance. She has a Super Pet named Mini Ellie/Ellie Pet. First appearing in Season 7, she was written off in Season 8. She later returned and reunited with the other Super Wings in the Season 9 Episodes "Stop the Space Monster" and "The Story of Jimbo's Wedding".
- Shine (샤인; Chinese: 小亮 Voiced by Evan Sheppard Greenbow) is a light blue cleaning plane who recycles and cleans garbage if needed on a mission. They have a Super Pet named Mini Shine/Shine Pet. Their first appearance is in Season 7, but they returned and reunited with the other Super Wings in the Season 9 Episodes "Stop the Space Monster" and "The Story of Jimbo's Wedding".
- Marc (Chinese: 大保 Voiced by Stephen Ingram) is a garbage truck that has the same colors as Shine, with whom they team up. They first appeared in Season 7 and re-appeared in the Season 9 Episode "Stop the Space Monster".
- Moza (모자; Chinese: 莫扎) is a Mosasaur Super Wing who is part of Dino Wings with Tino and Sally (in Season 8). His first appearance is in Season 8. He appears in the Episode “Blast from the Past” where he helps save the day by placing a giant rock on top of a volcano.
- Marty (마티; Chinese: 大力，Dàlì Voiced by Levi Wright in English version) is a dedicated tow plane. He is the strongest Super Wing, being made of super strong steel, and can lift anything in the world. He first appeared in Season 8, in which he replaces Donnie. He was written off in Season 10.
- Taki (티키; Chinese: 塔塔，Tǎ tǎ Voiced by Sebastian Savard in English version) and Tiki (타키; Chinese: 琪琪，Qí qí Voiced by Mackenzie Dhanasar in English version) is a pair of acrobatic twin-brother planes. They first appeared in Season 8. Although there are always childish arguments between them, when combined, they become a large catamaran with extraordinary acrobatic abilities. Their perception and physical abilities are those of normal people. Taki and his sister Tiki replace Jerome in Season 8.
- Traver (트레버; Chinese: 酷威 Voiced by Omar Sidani in English version) Is a silver-colored plane with a time capacity; meaning he can rewind time, go to the past, or stop it. He first appeared in Season 8, in which he replaces Astra. He was written off in Season 10.
- Sally (샐리; Chinese: 小翼 Voiced by Kristi Boulton in English version) is a purple pterodactyl-like-Super Wing, in the same way as Tino. She can create a huge gust of wind. Her first appearance is in Season 8.
- Lucie (루시; Chinese: 露探长 Voiced by Penelope Martin in English version) is blue police car with the ability to fly and possesses a shield that can grow larger. She first appeared in Season 8, in which she replaces Paul.
- Curie (큐리; Chinese: 酷芮 Voiced by Ezra Lombardo in English version) is a green plane, first appearing in Season 9. He specializes in science and does any kind of experiment.
- Runi (루니; Chinese: 大程 Voiced by Reid Almeida in English version) is a red-colored firefighter plane. He is Dizzy's older brother. His first appearance is in Season 9.
- Sara (세라; Chinese: 莎莎 Voiced by Emily Cooper in English version) is a pink plane, She appears when a prince or a princess needs help. She first appeared in Season 9.
- Brachy (브라키; Chinese: 小婉 Voiced by Maya Saper Silver in English version) is the transforming brachiosaurus of the Dino Wings. She can rescue dinos with her long neck.
- Stego (스테고; Chinese: 剑剑 Voiced by Gavin Gervais in English version) is the transforming stegosaurus of the Dino Wings. Additionally, he's known for being an amazing dino doctor. He first appeared in Season 9.
- Trico (트리코; Chinese: 小盾 Voiced by Benjamin Sivcevic in English version) is the transforming triceratops of the Dino Wings. Trico is afraid of water, but he has other amazing talents. He first appeared in Season 9.
- Max (맥스; Chinese: 咘咘奔 Voiced by Chase Egerton in English version). Max is Jett's helper in Season 10. He flies the Super Wings around everywhere and makes packages for Jett.
- Snap (스냅; Chinese: 酷影 Voiced by Leo Zhang in English version). Snap is a new Super Wing for Season 10. He can trap things in his special camera.
- Solar (솔라; Chinese: 昊昊 Voiced by Keith David in English version) Solar is a new Super Wing for Season 10. He is the sun guardian who guards an ancient temple in the sky.
- Rattie (래티; Chinese: 小飒 Voiced by Julieta Cortes in English version) Rattie is a new Super Wing for Season 10. She is the transforming velociraptor of the Dino Wings. She is an energetic and curious velociraptor. Sometimes, when she meet a new friend she got really excited about it.
- Sharky (샤키; Chinese: 沙奇 Voiced by Austin Farley in English version) Sharky is a new Super Wings for Season 10. He is the transforming dinosaur and shark of Super Wings. He's known as the "guardian of the sea" who focused on search, rescue, and underwater/surfing missions.

=== Antagonist ===
- Super Drones (슈퍼 드론; Syupeo deuron; Chinese: 超级无人机, Chāojí wú rén jī) are machines that Neo made. They are one-time characters and only appear in the Season 3 episode "Send in the Drones".
- Golden Boy (골든 보이; Goldeun boi; Chinese: 金小子, Jīn xiǎozi; voiced by Jeon Tae-yeol in the Korean version, Connor Andrade (Season 5), Vega de Seve (Season 6), Brody Agmon (Season 7 - 9) and Aiden Blanken (Season 10 - present) in the English version) is a golden yellow male plane and the antagonistic villain in the series. He first appears in Season 5 and always plays tricks on Jett and his friends. Golden Boy gets a new sidekick called Golden Wheels in Season 6, who disappears in subsequent seasons. In Season 7, Golden Boy is followed by his Super Pet named Mini Golden Boy/Golden Pet. He even has a cousin named Golden Girl in Season 8.
- Mambo (맘보; Chinese: 曼包) is a blue all-terrain vehicle with orange and red flames. He appears for the first time in the Season 5 episode "Geneva Car Show Chaos", then again in the episode "The Great Desert Dash" where he teams up with Golden Boy. He was written off in Season 6.
- Golden Wheels (골든 트럭; Goldeun teureok; Chinese: 金小卡 Voiced by Tim Heller in English version) is a golden yellow male truck and the second antagonist in Season 6 only. He is the new sidekick of Golden Boy and they make more tricks on Jett's missions. Unlike the plane, Golden Wheels does not transform. He was written off in Season 7.
- Golden Girl (골든걸; Goldeungeol; Chinese: 金小薇 voiced by Kennedy Feth in English version) is Golden Boy's cousin. Her appearance is opposite to him as she is more pink-gold than yellow-gold. Additionally, she is more amazed and excited about everything she sees. She has a star wand that can change color, grow big things, or make illusions. she first appeared in Season 8 and was written off in Season 10.
- Billy Willy (빌리윌리; Billiwilli; Chinese: 比利威利, Bǐ lì wēi lì) is the first human villain and the main antagonist of the Movie: Maximum Speed. He is described as a "Toy King" and wants to take revenge of influencers, crossing the path of Jett and the other Super Wings.
- Dark Golden Boy (다크 골든 보이; Dakeu goldeun boi; Chinese: 黑金小子, Jīn xiǎozi;) Golden Boy gets super powers in Season 10 by having multiple rocket arms and combining them into one giant arm. In Season 10, he is painted Golden Black.
- Super Roy (슈퍼꽁지; Chinese: 超级黑皮皮)

=== Occasional characters ===
- Ray (콩지; Kongji; Chinese: 伟尔, Wéi ěr) is another luggage tug, who looks like Roy because they are twins. He appears during the introduction segment of the episodes "Fiesta! Fiesta!" (Season 1) and "Doubles Trouble" (Season 2), but he does not live in World Airport. He was written off in Season 3.
- Fred (세찬; Sechan; Chinese: 弗雷德, Fú léi dé) is an orange and white male plane. He appears in the introductory segment of the episodes "Penguin Parade" (Season 1) and "Moscow Metro" (Season 3). Unlike the Super Wings, Fred does not transform into a robot. He was absent in Season 2 and written off in Season 4.
- Thunder (썬더; Sseondeo; Chinese: 雷, Léi) and his teammates Therno and Strato are a stunt team and appear in the Season 3 episode "Abu Dhabi Thunder", where they face Team Jerome. He was written off in season 4.
- Narae (나래; Narae; Chinese: 奈莱, Nài lái) is a white and blue plane. She is the mascot of the South Korea National Aviation Museum and appears in the Season 5 episode "Airport Museum Adventure" to help the Super Wings. Narae can also transform. She was written off in season 6.
- Windy (은하; Eunha; Chinese: 小云, Xiǎo Yún Voiced by Ella Li in English version) is a young human girl who is Storm's little sister. She appears during the Season 5 episode "Super Pet Sweep Up Surprise". Her "Super Wings Mission" was to keep the Super Pets, but almost failed due to one of Golden Boy's plans. She was absent in seasons 6 and 7 but reappeared in Season 8.
- Xuan Yi (쑤언 이; Ssueon i; Chinese: 宣仪, Xuān yí) is an ocher-colored car that can transform into a robot. He appears in the "Super Wings x Nissan Mini Movie", in which he helps Jett and Cici. (Season 4, episode "Guangzhou Lightshow")
- Pei (다인; Dain; Chinese: 飞飞, Fei Fei) is a human girl who helps Jett during the Super Wings Movie: Maximum Speed. She is mostly wears yellow clothes. She is also a victim of Billy Willy due to her mother being captured by him.

=== Teams ===
In Season 3, Jett received help from a team of Super Wings instead of just one. Whenever a Super Wings team got selected, his wings symbol changed to that of the assisting team and he gained a new helmet and equipment related to the team (except for Team Jerome and the Big Team).

- Rescue Riders are composed of Dizzy, Zoey and Sparky. Specializing in rescue operations, they often help Jett in medical situations, fires and search and rescue. When Jett works with the Rescue Riders, he gains a safety helmet and a backpack loaded with first aid supplies and emergency kits. Zoey was written off in Season 5, leaving Dizzy and Sparky.
- Build-It Buddies are composed of Donnie, Scoop, and Remi. Specializing in construction and repair jobs, they often help Jett in situations where they need to build something. When Jett works with the Build-It Buddies, he gains a hard hat and a backpack loaded with a large assortment of tools. Scoop was written off in Season 5, leaving his two siblings. Remi was written off in Season 6, leaving only Donnie, although she returned in Season 8. Donnie was written off in Season 8, leaving Remi.
- Galaxy Wings are composed of Astra, Astro, and Rover. Specializing in problems involving space and technology, they often help Jett in situations involving space travel and advanced technology. When Jett works with the Galaxy Wings, he gains a space helmet and a jetpack containing specialized equipment. Astro was written off in Season 6, leaving his twin sister Astra and Rover. Astra was written off in Season 8, leaving only Rover.
- Wild Team is composed of Mira, Swampy, and Willie. Specializing in missions on water and in the wild, they often help Jett in situations involving underwater travel or swamp treks. When Jett works with the Wild Team, he gains a set of diving masks and a pair of turboprops on his wings. Mira and Swampy were written off in Season 5, leaving Willie. Willie re-appeared once in Season 6 and was written off in Season 7, the complete team made a return in an episode of Season 8: Electric Heroes. Also, Mira appeared in the Cultural China season.
- Police Patrol is composed of Paul, Kim, and Badge. Specializing in detective works and crowd control, they often help Jett in situations involving public masses and lost objects. When Jett works with the Police Patrol, he gains a safety helmet and a backpack loaded with assorted equipment. Kim was written off in Season 5, leaving Paul and Badge. Badge was written off in Season 6, leaving only Paul. Paul was written off in Season 8 and now all of the members of the Police Patrol are gone which means the Police Patrol no longer exists.
- Big Team is composed of Sparky, Remi, Rover, Willie, and Badge. Specializing in many missions and many problems, they help Jett in situations that involve stuck people. Remi and Badge were written off in Season 6, leaving Sparky, Rover, and Willie. Willie was absent in Season 5, but returned in Season 6 and was written off in Season 7, leaving Sparky and Rover. Remi and Willie returned in Season 8. Badge did not return in Season 7 or 8, which means that he is the only member of the Big Team to never come back.
- Team Jerome is composed of Jerome, Jerry, and Arome. Unlike the other Super Wings teams, Team Jerome is a specialized stunt team, often seen at airshows. Jerry and Arome were written off in Season 4, leaving only Jerome. Jerome re-appeared once in Season 7 and was written off in Season 8, and now all of the members of Team Jerome are gone which means Team Jerome no longer exists.

== Episodes ==
Season	Episodes	Originally released	
Season	Episodes	First released	Last released
1	52	September 1, 2014	July 7, 2015
2	52	March 1, 2017	November 30, 2017
3	40	February 25, 2019	May 21, 2019
4	40	March 30, 2020	June 24, 2020
5	40	March 29, 2021	June 28, 2021
6	40	February 28, 2022	July 11, 2022
7	40	February 27, 2023	May 23, 2023
8	40	December 1, 2023	May 7, 2024
9	40	November 28, 2024	November 29, 2025
10	40	December 6, 2025	May 5, 2026

== Production and development ==
In 2010, Super Wings arose out of Little Airplane Wissie (Korean: 꼬마비행기 위시) which took place in Ciel City. The main character of this series, Jett, was originally named Wissie. Here, Wissie and his friends cannot transform into robots, unlike in the current concept.

Super Wings was announced in September 2013, and had a licensing market debut at that year's MIPJunior in Cannes, France, when FunnyFlux Entertainment partemered with the American entertainment company Little Airplane Productions and Chinese animation production alum Qianqi Animation teamed up to create a CGI-animated series that features Jett the jet plane, who travels the world delivering unique packages to children. Quanqi Animation would handle animation productions for the first season.

In August 2016, during production of Super Wings' second season, FunnyFlux Entertainment & Little Airplane Productions announced that they had transferred its licensing & merchandising responsibilities for Super Wings to the German international brand management & media entertainment production company Made 4 Entertainment (m4e) for German-speaking territories and countries like Germany, as m4e had been appointed to handle licensing & merchandising for the series as it assuming the licensing agent for the successful animated series, while FunnyFlux Entertainment and Little Airplane Productions had retained television & home entertainment rights.

=== Animation ===
The animation for the entire series is done by FunnyFlux Entertainment in-house with Alpha Group via its animation production division Alpha Huani Animation, fka Huani Animation, provided animation services from season 3 onwards, Alpha Huani Animation would later assume animation production on the 3rd season of Alpha Group's fellow animated TV series Quantum Heroes Dinoster. N-GEO Animation Studio would provide additional animation production for Super Wings' 5th, 6th, 7th and 8th seasons.

== Release ==
=== Distribution ===
Alpha Animation and Culture held the distribution rights of the series in Mainland China and the rest of Asia, as well as the Middle East. The series was internationally distributed by CJ E&M until 2017 when Alpha Group taken over global distribution rights to the series from season 2 onwards, giving Alpha Group full control of the series.

=== Broadcast ===
In South Korea, Super Wings premiered on September 1, 2014, on EBS1. The initial airings on EBS included a segment which celebrated certain children's birthdays during the closing credits. The show was repeated on some of children's interest channels on multichannel platforms in the country since then: Tooniverse, owned by CJ E&M, was one such channel. Season 2 premiered on March 1, 2017, on EBS1.

In China, the series was syndicated, distributed by Alpha to television stations. In Japan, the series was broadcast on BS11. However, the series first aired only as Seasons 2 and 3 (not including Season 1). In the United States, Super Wings also premiered on March 14, 2015, on Sprout (now Universal Kids) and also streamed on Netflix and Cartoonito. In Canada, the series premiered on March 3, 2015, on Treehouse TV (owned by Corus) and also aired on Family Jr, while a French version aired on Ici Radio-Canada Télé's children's block and Télé-Québec. In the UK and Ireland, Super Wings premiered on Cartoonito and Tiny Pop on February 6, 2017. Super Wings has also been broadcast on ABC Kids in Australia, TVNZ in New Zealand, and Nick Jr. in both countries.

In the Arab World, the series was broadcast on Spacetoon on March 7, 2016, while in Saudi Arabia, the series was broadcast on Basma on 2018. In Singapore, the series debuted on Okto on October 14, 2017. In Hong Kong, the series debuted on Now TV (Hong Kong) on April 25, 2019. In Indonesia, the series was originally broadcast on GTV (formerly Global TV). However, the third season debuted on RTV on April 29, 2019. The fourth season debuted on August 5, 2020. In Israel, the series was broadcast on Hop! Channel.

In Germany, the series was broadcast on Super RTL and KiKA. In Russia, the series was broadcast on Karusel. In Poland, the series was broadcast on TVP ABC & Polsat JimJam. In Ukraine, the series was broadcast on PLUSPLUS. In France, the series was broadcast on TF1, Gulli & Piwi+. In Croatia, the series was broadcast on RTL Kockica. In Thailand, the series was broadcast on Boomerang and Toonee. In the Netherlands, the series was broadcast on RTL Telekids. In Finland, the series was broadcast on YLE TV2. In the United Arab Emirates, the series was broadcast on e-Junior. In Spain, the series was broadcast on Clan. In Angola, the series was broadcast on ZTV. In Latin America and Brazil, it first aired on Discovery Kids on April 13, 2015.

== Awards and nominations ==
Year	Award	Category	Nominee	Result
2016	International Emmy Kids Awards	Kids: Preschool	Super Wings	Nominated
2019	International Emmy Kids Awards	Kids: Preschool	Super Wings	Nominated

== Spin-offs ==
=== Super Wings the Movie: Maximum Speed ===
The Super Wings Movie was first announced in 2021 on the Alpha Group Animation website with a teaser. The movie was officially released on 8 July 2023 in China, 20 July in South Korea, 9 February 2024 in Turkey, 15 February in Russia, 3 May in Ireland and the UK, and 27 June on Netflix (only in South Korea). In the movie, Jett faces a new villain named Billy Willy, who wants to create a "toy battle" in the whole world and get rid of social media influencers. Jett receives help from a girl named Pei, along with major characters from the TV Series (Dizzy, Donnie, Paul, Jerome, Mira, Wily, Astra, and Sky).

=== Super Wings: Cultural China ===
Super Wings: Cultural China (Chinese: 超级飞侠文化中华; pinyin: Chāojí fēi xiá wénhuà zhōnghuá) is the first spin-off season of Super Wings. The series is about Chinese culture and Jett delivers to China in every episode for this spin-off season, unlike the main seasons, where he delivers to international countries. It debuted in China in 2023. The one character coming back is Mira, who was written off 3 seasons ago, and appears in the opening, ending and 22nd episode for this spin-off season. Storm and Jimbo was written off in this spin-off series before the former's return in season 8. The spin-off season was shown as 24 2-part 7-minute episodes.

=== Super Wings: Mysterious Core ===
Super Wings: Mysterious Core (Chinese: 超级飞侠之奇芯宝藏) is the second spin-off season of Super Wings. The series begins when Li Ao, a young man with a passion for solving puzzles, accidentally activates a secret diary belonging to Dr. Fang and an ancient technology known as the "Mysterious Core" (or "Magical Core"). Fragments of the core (Wonder Chip fragments) are scattered across historical museums and protected sites around the world. Li Ao teams up with the Super Wings squad (Jett, Dizzy, Paul, Donnie, etc.) to locate these powerful pieces before they fall into the wrong hands. Together, they embark on a global treasure hunt stretching from ancient Chinese ruins in Xi'an to the Egyptian Pyramids, and from the Louvre Museum in Paris to London. As they bring historical artifacts to life and unravel ancient secrets, the team must also battle a brand-new squad of villainous robots known as the "Treasure Raiders", who seek to steal the core's power and endanger the world. The first season of the spin-off series released in China on 21 August 2026, and the second released on 23 October the same year.

Some characters have reappeared as guests in some episodes of the spin-off series, such as Lime from season 6, Grand Albert from Season 1-2, Crystal from Season 4 and Chase from Season 2.

== Merchandise and other media ==
In China, Alpha Animation and Culture (and the Auldey brand which also operates Alpha's toy division) held master/international toy licenses. In the United States and Canada, the toys were respectively sold by Auldey Toys and Imports Dragon. In South Korea, David Toy owned the Korean toy license. In the United States, Canada and France, Nelvana (itself owned by Corus) owned consumer products rights to Super Wings.
