= Secret Zoo =

- Theatrical poster
- Directed by: Son Jae-gon
- Screenplay by: Son Jae-gon; Lee Yong-jae; Kim Dae-woo
- Based on: I Don't Bully You by Hun
- Produced by: Kim Sung-hwan; Park Hyun-tae
- Starring: Ahn Jae-hong; Kang So-ra; Park Yeong-gyu; Kim Sung-oh; Jeon Yeo-been
- Cinematography: Lee Seung-hoon
- Edited by: Lee Kang-hui
- Music by: Lee Jean-hui
- Production companies: AboutFilm; DCG Plus
- Distributed by: Acemaker Movieworks
- Release date: January 15, 2020
- Running time: 117 minutes
- Country: South Korea
- Language: Korean
- Budget: ₩10 billion (~US$8.1 million)
- Box office: $9.5 million

Secret Zoo (Korean: 해치지않아; lit. 'I Don't Bully You') is a 2020 South Korean comedy film directed by Son Jae-gon, starring Ahn Jae-hong, Kang So-ra, Park Yeong-gyu, Kim Sung-oh, and Jeon Yeo-been. Based the webtoon I Don't Bully You by Hun, it was released on January 15, 2020, in South Korea and on January 24 in the United States.

== Plot ==
Stuck in a dead-end temp position at a renowned law firm, attorney-at-law Tae Soo (Ahn Jae-Hong) dreams of one day landing a permanent position there. One day, he is given a special job to revitalize a failing zoo. The problem is, there are no animals. Moreover, he has exactly 3 months to do so. With the zookeepers' help, he comes up with a brilliant idea of having the zookeepers dress up as animals.

One by one, the zookeepers put on animal suits and masks and become polar bears, lions, gorillas, and sloths. The new zoo opens and Tae Soo's polar bear goes viral when a video of him drinking a can of coke hits the internet. Thanks to everyone's help, the zoo with fake animals is a massive hit and Tae Soo can now go back to the law firm with a permanent job. But before he leaves the zoo, he finds out what his law firm was planning with the zoo.

Can Tae Soo come up with another brilliant idea to save not only himself but the zookeepers and the zoo?

== Cast ==
- Ahn Jae-hong as Kang Tae-soo
- Kang So-ra as Han So-won
- Park Yeong-gyu as Director Seo
- Kim Sung-oh as Kim Gun-wook
- Jeon Yeo-been as Kim Hae-kyung
- Park Hyuk-kwon as President Hwang
- Seo Hyun-woo as Secretary Oh
- Jang Seung-jo as Sungmin
- Park Hyung-soo as Barrister Song
- Kim Heung-rae as Black Nose
- Lee Hyun-wook as Min Chul-hyun
- Han Ye-ri as Min Chae-ryung
- Kim Gi-cheon as Representative Go
- Song Duk-ho as Person in audience
- Kim Hyun as Dismissed employee

== Production ==
Principal photography began on October 8, 2018 and filming was completed on January 19, 2019.

== Reception ==
=== Box office ===
The film debuted in first place during its opening weekend. However, ticket sales decreased by 77% in its second week.

=== Critical response ===
Secret Zoo holds an 80% approval rating on the review aggregator website Rotten Tomatoes, based on five reviews.

Michael Rechtshaffen of the Los Angeles Times said that "resistance might not be futile, but to deny oneself the amiably goofy charms of South Korea's Secret Zoo, an inspired family comedy that gives fresh meaning to faux fur, would be a real shame." For Panos Kotzathanasis of HanCinema, "Secret Zoo is a film that aims at providing fun for its audience, and in that regard, it succeeds to the fullest."

== See also ==
- List of 2020 box office number-one films in South Korea
