= Koreans in Nepal =

Ethnic group

Korean Nepalese
Total population
- 645 (2013)

Regions with significant populations
- Kathmandu · Pokhara

Languages
- Korean · Nepali

Religion
- Christianity · Buddhism

Related ethnic groups
- Korean diaspora

Korean Nepalese are the Nepalis who form a small expatriate community consisting mainly of Catholic nuns, volunteers and businesspeople. According to South Korea's Ministry of Foreign Affairs and Trade, there were 645 South Koreans living in Nepal as of 2013, up by more than 70% from 374 in 2009. There are also known to be some North Koreans doing business in the country.

== Overview ==
Catholic nuns from the Sisters of St. Paul of Chartres (SPC) in South Korea have been coming to Nepal to provide health services and education to the local people. The nuns now have two communities in Nepal, the Kathmandu community with three sisters which focuses on education and the Pokhara community, 200 kilometers west of Kathmandu, which also has three sisters, will provide health services through a mobile clinic. These nuns also speak the Nepali language.

The Korea International Cooperation Agency has been dispatching volunteer teachers to Nepal to promote Korean language and culture to the local Nepalese people so they will have a wider knowledge of Korea and its culture when they go there. There are also a number of Koreans running orphanages in the country.

There are also a number of North Korean restaurants in Kathmandu which became hangouts for many South Korean expatriates and tourists in the city. Recently the South Korean embassy in Nepal wrote to expatriates and tour operators asking them to refrain from visiting North Korean restaurants that are becoming sources of funds for the Pyongyang regime.

== Culture ==
Korean culture is visible in the streets of Kathmandu. Many Nepalese youths are fans of Korean films, actors and fashion. The Embassy of the Republic of Korea in Kathmandu has been organizing the Korean Film Festival twice a year since 2010. Youngsters in Kathmandu, Pokhara and Dharan have of late adopted elements of Korean fashion.

== See also ==
- Nepalis in South Korea
- Koreans in India
