= Top Ten =

A top ten list is a list of the ten highest-ranking items of a given category.

Top Ten or Top 10 may also refer to:

== Media ==
- Top 10, a common record chart for the ten most popular songs of the week in the musical chart of a country
- America's Top 10, a television program hosted by Casey Kasem among others
- Top 10 (comics), a comic book published by DC Comics
- Top 10 (Canadian TV program), a Canadian television program broadcast on NHL Network showing the Top 10 in various categories
- TopTen, a Mexican music television program broadcast on Azteca Trece.
- Top Ten (U.S. TV program), an American television program broadcast on Military Channel about top military weapons and systems
- Late Show Top Ten List, a regular segment on the Late Show with David Letterman
- ScrewAttack's Top 10, a video game-related web series

== Places ==
- Top Ten Club, a club in Hamburg, Germany made famous as an early venue for the Beatles

== Brands ==
- Topten, a South Korean clothing brand
- TopTen, an Estonian record label

== Other uses ==
- Top10 (rugby union), Italy's top-level professional men's rugby union competition
