= Collectors (film) =

South Korean heist thriller film

- Theatrical release poster
- Hangul: 도굴
- Hanja: 盜掘
- RR: Dogul
- MR: Togul
- Directed by: Park Jung-bae
- Screenplay by: Ryu Sun-gyu
- Produced by: Hwang Dong-hyuk
- Starring: Lee Je-hoon; Jo Woo-jin; Shin Hye-sun; Im Won-hee
- Cinematography: Kim Seong-an
- Edited by: Nam Na-young
- Music by: Dalpalan
- Production company: Siren Pictures
- Distributed by: CJ Entertainment
- Release date: November 4, 2020
- Running time: 114 minutes
- Country: South Korea
- Language: Korean
- Box office: US$12.6 million

Collectors (Korean: 도굴; RR: Dogul; lit. 'Grave Robbery') is a 2020 South Korean heist action comedy film directed by Park Jung-bae and produced by Hwang Dong-hyuk. The film starring Lee Je-hoon, Jo Woo-jin, Shin Hye-sun and Im Won-hee, tells the caper story of a grave robbery taking place in the heart of Seoul.

The film released on November 4, 2020, opened at the top of the local box office, as it sold about 80,000 tickets and grossed 701.6 million KRW (estimated US$626,916) on the opening day.

As of January 2, 2021, Collectors is in 13th place, with a gross of US$12.43 million and 1.52 million admissions, among all the films released in South Korea in the year 2020.

== Plot ==
Kang Dong-goo (Lee Je-hoon) is a gifted grave robber known in the underworld for his uncanny intuition in locating hidden burial chambers and relics. Operating in and around Seoul, he relies on instinct and improvisation rather than formal archaeological training. Dong-goo lives with veteran digger Man-gi (Joo Jin-mo), who taught him grave-robbing skills, and Man-gi’s tech-savvy daughter Hye-ri (Park Se-wan), who provides logistical and hacking support. During his heists, Dong-goo leaves behind the wrapper of a chocolate pie as a personal calling card whenever he successfully escapes with an artifact.

After stealing a valuable Buddha statue from a temple even under police protection, Dong-goo approaches wealthy antiques broker Sang-gil (Song Young-chang) to fence the item. Impressed by Dong-goo’s daring and talent, Sang-gil strikes a deal to handle his future finds and soon commissions him to obtain a mural from a Goguryeo-era tomb. To pull off the more complex tomb robbery, Dong-goo recruits Dr. Jones (Jo Woo-jin), a specialist in ancient tomb murals who can decipher layouts and hidden passages. Sang-gil, meanwhile, is revealed to be a secret collector who has amassed a large private hoard of illegally excavated antiquities, stored in a heavily fortified vault and managed with the assistance of museum curator and antiques expert Yoon Se-hee (Shin Hye-sun), who helps authenticate and quietly move the pieces.

Through flashbacks, it is revealed that years earlier Sang-gil hired Dong-goo’s father for a tomb robbery, then murdered him and attempted to bury a young Dong-goo alive, leaving him a chocolate pie as a final “gift” before sealing the grave. Dong-goo survived, but the betrayal left him with a deep desire for revenge. In the present, he continues to work for Sang-gil while secretly plotting to bring him down. When Dong-goo persuades Sang-gil that a legendary royal sword from the tomb of King Seongjong may still lie hidden beneath central Seoul, the two men agree on a high-stakes heist: under the cover of an official refurbishment project at the royal tomb, Dong-goo will lead an expanded crew–including legendary shoveling master Sapdari (Im Won-hee), nicknamed “Shovel Leg” for his speed and precision–to tunnel into the underground site and recover the weapon before the authorities or rival criminals can interfere.

Kang and his team eventually succeed in reaching the royal tomb, but the job is only part of Kang's larger plan to take revenge on Sang-gil for murdering his father years earlier and attempting to bury Kang alive. After luring Sang-gil into the tomb on the promise of a hidden royal sword, Kang abandons him underground and leaves him with a chocolate pie, mirroring the way Sang-gil once left Kang for dead. Sang-gil is later discovered and rescued by the legitimate refurbishment crew, only to find that his carefully guarded private collection has been cleared out. Se-hee, who has secretly shut down Sang-gil's security system to steal his hoard for herself, is shocked to discover that Kang has already emptied the vault, leaving behind only a portrait. It is revealed that while Kang's crew were tunneling toward the royal tomb, Man-gi and Hye-ri dug a separate tunnel to Sang-gil's vault, working with police officer Chief Oh to recover the stolen antiquities and return them to museums. Kang's crew keeps Sang-gil's cash for themselves, while the public credit for the recovery of the artifacts is given to Se-hee, who was thoroughly tricked.

== Cast ==
- Lee Je-hoon is Kang Dong-goo, a genius robber with a unique touch and intuition.
- Jo Woo-jin as Dr. Jones, an expert in tomb mural robbery.
- Shin Hye-sun as Yoon Se-hee, a curator.
- Im Won-hee as Shovel Leg, named after his legendary shoveling skills.
- Song Young-chang as Sang-gil
- Joo Jin-mo as Man-gi
- Lee Sung-wook as Gwang-chul
- Park Se-wan as Hye-ri
- Park Jin-woo as Chief Oh

== Production ==
In March 2019, Lee Je-hoon was confirmed to play the protagonist in the film. In May 2019, Shin Hye-sun's appearance was confirmed in the film.

== Release ==
Collectors was invited at Fantasia International Film Festival to screen the film. The three-week festivals was held from August 5 to 25, 2021 in Montreal. The film was screened in Canadian Premiere section on August 17, 2021.

== Reception ==
=== Box office ===
The film released on November 4, 2020, opened at top of local box office, as it sold about 80,000 tickets and grossed 701.6 million ₩ (around US$626,916). It remained no.1 film on Korean box office for consecutive three weeks from November 8 to November 22, 2020.

According to Korean Film Council data†, it is at 11th place among all the Korean films released in the year 2020, with gross of US$12.15 million and 1.54 million admissions, as of January 3, 2021.

Admissions Based on the Integrated Computer Network for Cinema Admission Tickets
| As of | Cumulative admissions | Ref. |
|---|---|---|
| February 23, 2021 | 1,545,281 persons | |

Admissions (persons) as of respective weekend date
| Week ending | Admissions (cumulative) | Notes |
|---|---|---|
| As of January 24, 2021 | 1,544,928 | Weekend:529 |
| As of January 17, 2021 | 1,543,278 | Weekend:3,243 |
| As of January 10, 2021 | 1,537,801 | Weekend:3,970 |
| As of January 3, 2021 | 1,530,885 | Weekend:7,371 |
| As of December 27, 2020 | 1,511,574 | Weekend:18,033 |
| As of December 20, 2020 | 1,481,363 | Weekend:16,494 |
| As of December 13, 2020 | 1,452,176 | Weekend:15,017 |
| As of December 6, 2020 | 1,423,700 | Weekend:26,863 |
| As of November 29, 2020 | 1,369,546 | Weekend:42,828 |
| As of November 22, 2020 | 1,276,614 | No.1 at BO |
| As of November 15, 2020 | 1,001,230 | No.1 at BO |
| As of November 8, 2020 | 565,503 | No.1 at BO |

=== Critical response ===
Going by Korean review aggregator Naver Movie Database, the film holds an approval rating of 8.48 from the audience.
