= Moon Nam-sook =

South Korean voice actor

Moon Nam-sook (Korean: 문남숙 is a South Korean voice actress who joined the Munhwa Broadcasting Corporation's voice acting division in 2002.

== Roles ==
=== Broadcast TV ===
- 24 (extra guest, Korea TV Edition, MBC)
- Catch! Teenieping (JEI TV) - Banggeulping/Teeheeping
- CSI: Crime Scene Investigation (extra guest, Korea TV Edition, MBC)
- CSI: Miami (extra guest, Korea TV Edition, MBC)
- iCarly (Nickelodeon) - Samantha Puckett
- Super Wings (EBS) - Jett
- Tayo the Little Bus - Tayo
- The Amazing Adrenalini Brothers (Cartoon Network, Korea TV Edition)
- The Powerpuff Girls (Cartoon Network) - Buttercup

=== Film dubbing ===
- Con Air (replacing Monica Potter, Korea TV Edition, MBC)
- Underworld (replacing Sophia Miles, Korea TV Edition, MBC)
- Chicago (replacing Lucy Liu, Korea TV Edition, MBC)
- Bumblebee (replacing Hailee Steinfeld, in-flight)
- Tayo the Little Bus - Tayo
- Doraemon

== See also ==
- MBC Voice Acting Division

== Homepage ==
- (in Korean) Daum Cafe Voice Actor Moon Nam-sook
- (in Korean) MBC Voice Acting division Moon Nam-sook's blog
