= Kim Joon (actor, born 2014) =

South Korean child actor (born 2014)

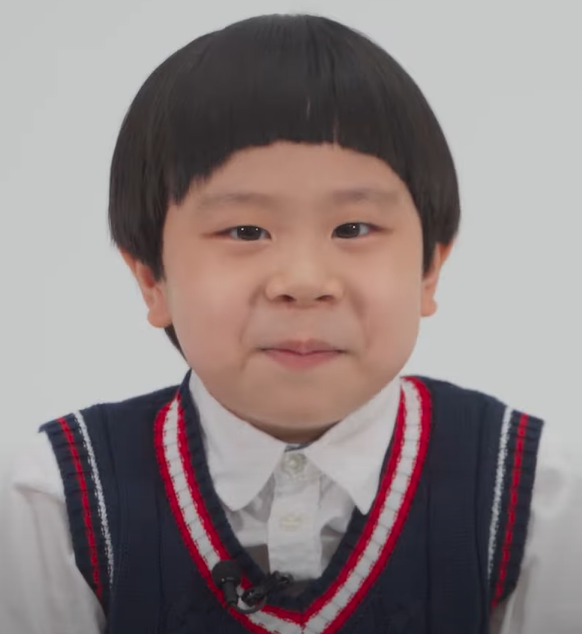
- Kim in December 2022
- Born: May 12, 2014 (age 11); Daejeon, South Korea
- Other names: Gim Jun
- Occupation: Actor
- Years active: 2019–present
- Agent: H9 Company

Korean name
- Hangul: 김준
- RR: Gim Jun
- MR: Kim Chun

Kim Joon (born May 12, 2014) is a South Korean actor.

== Filmography ==
=== Television series ===
| Year | Title | Role | Notes | Ref. |
|---|---|---|---|---|
| 2019 | Save Me 2 | 6-years-old boy at a restaurant | extra, ep 1 | |
| 2020–2021 | Hospital Playlist | Lee Woo-joo | Season 1–2 | |
| 2022 | Summer Strike | Bae Joon | | |

=== Film ===
| Year | Title | Role | Notes | Ref. |
|---|---|---|---|---|
| 2020 | And So Again Today | Ha-yool | segment: "My Wife Got Fat" | |
| 2023 | Switch | Ro-ha | | |

=== Web series ===
| Year | Title | Role | Ref. |
|---|---|---|---|
| 2023 | Moving | Jeon Gye-do (child) | |
