= Kim Hee-won =

South Korean actor

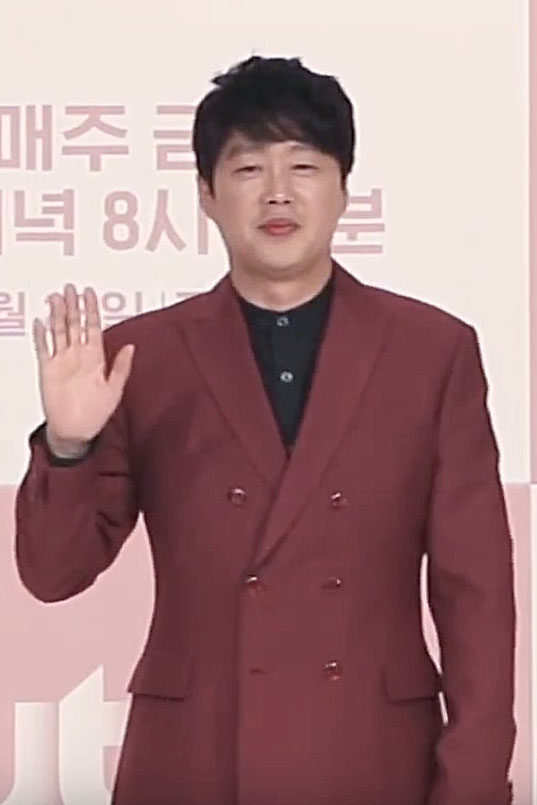
- Kim in 2016
- Born: January 10, 1971 (age 55); Namyangju, Gyeonggi-do, South Korea
- Education: Seoul Institute of the Arts – Theater
- Occupation: Actor
- Years active: 2007–present
- Agent: Han Geo Rum Entertainment

Korean name
- Hangul: 김희원
- RR: Gim Huiwon
- MR: Kim Hŭiwŏn

Kim Hee-won (Korean: 김희원; born January 10, 1971) is a South Korean actor and director. Since 2007, he has played supporting roles in films and television series, with notable titles including The Man from Nowhere (2010), Mr. Go (2013), and Misaeng: Incomplete Life (2014).

== Filmography ==
=== As actor ===
==== Film ====
Year	Title	Role	Notes/Ref.
2007	Miracle on 1st Street	Chief Kim	
2007	Underground Rendezvous	Staff sergeant Kim	
2007	Scout	Jung Byung-hwan	
2009	Running Turtle	Teukgong Moosool instructor	
2009	Fortune Salon	Byung-soo	
2009	Lady Daddy	Detective Kim	
2010	The Man from Nowhere	Man-seok	
2010	Twilight Gangsters	Detective Kim	
2011	My Way	Choon-bok	
2013	Mr. Go	Lin Xiaogang	
2013	Steal My Heart	Auctioneer	Cameo
2013	The X	Boss	Short film
2014	Hot Young Bloods	Teacher Lee Jong-pal	
2014	No Tears for the Dead	Department head Byun	
2014	Scarlet Innocence	Casino Mr. Choi	
2014	Cart	Convenience store boss	
2015	The Beauty Inside	Woo-jin	
2015	Collective Invention	Lawyer Kim	
2016	Missing	Detective Park	
2016	Canola	Suk-ho	
2016	Vanishing Time: A Boy Who Returned	Do-kyun	
2017	The Merciless	Ko Byung-gab	
2017	The King's Case Note	Nam Gun-hee	
2017	Marionette	Oh Kook-chul	
2019	Race to Freedom: Um Bok Dong		
2019	Another Child	Teacher Kim	
2019	The Divine Move 2: The Wrathful	Teacher Ddong	
2020	Pawn	Jong-bae	
2020	Best Friend		
2021	Voice	Lee Kyu-ho	
2021	Perhaps Love	Sunmo	
2023	Unlocked	Detective Ji-man	
2023	Project Silence	Dr. Yang	
2025	Hi-Five	Yak-sun	

==== Television series ====
Year	Title	Role	Network
2008	Tazza	Brown Bear's underling	SBS
2010	Oh! My Lady	Jung Yoon-seok	SBS
2010	KBS Drama Special "I'm a Butterfly"	Kang Mu-seong	KBS2
2011	Midnight Hospital	Choi Kwang-guk	MBC
2011	Lights and Shadows	Yang Tae-sung	MBC
2012	KBS Drama Special "Do You Know Taekwondo?"	Kwang-hyun	KBS2
2012	Ji Woon-soo's Stroke of Luck	Ji Woon-soo's Ka Center friend (cameo)	TV Chosun
2013	Gu Family Book	Buddhist monk Sojung	MBC
2013	Monstar	CEO Go	Mnet
2013	My Love from the Star	Detective Park Byung-hee	SBS
2014	Misaeng: Incomplete Life	Park Jong-shik	tvN
2015	Angry Mom	Ahn Dong-chil	MBC
2015	Let's Eat 2	Im Taek-soo	tvN
2015	Songgot: The Piercer	Joo Kang-min	JTBC
2016	Bring It On, Ghost	Detective	tvN
2016	Drinking Solo	Cameo	tvN
2016	Listen to Love	Won Gi	JTBC
2017	Oh, the Mysterious	Park Soo-Chil	SBS
2019	The Light in Your Eyes	Kim Hee-won	JTBC
2023	Behind Your Touch	Won Jong-mook	JTBC

==== Web series ====
Year	Title	Role	Ref.
2023	Moving	Choi Il-hwan	
2023	Han River Police	Lee Chun-seok	

==== Variety show ====
Year	Show	Role	Notes/Ref.
2020–present	House on Wheels	Cast Member	Season 1–4

=== As filmmaker ===
Series performance
Year	Title		Note	Ref.
Year	English	Korean	Note	Ref.
2024	Light Shop	조명가게	Director	

== Theater ==
Year	Title	Notes/Ref.
	A Midsummer Night's Dream	
	Othello	
	Hamlet	
	Subway Line 1	
	Moskito	
	Master Wonsul	
	Jesus Christ Superstar	
	Song of Grass	
	Jang Bogo's Dream	
2009–2010	Laundry	Theatre director

== Awards and nominations ==
Year	Award	Category	Nominated work	Result
2017	26th Buil Film Awards	Best Supporting Actor	The Merciless	Won
2017	54th Grand Bell Awards	Best Supporting Actor	The Merciless	Nominated
2017	38th Blue Dragon Film Awards	Best Supporting Actor	The Merciless	Nominated
2017	4th Korean Film Producers Association Awards	Best Supporting Actor	The Merciless	Won
2018	54th Baeksang Arts Awards	Best Supporting Actor (Film)	The Merciless	Nominated
2018	23rd Chunsa Film Art Awards	Best Supporting Actor	The Merciless	Nominated
2021	Golden Cinematography Awards	Best Supporting Actor	Pawn	Won
2022	58th Grand Bell Awards	Best Supporting Actor	Perhaps Love	Nominated
