= Soe Thiha =

Burmese politician

Member of the Amyotha Hluttaw
- Incumbent
- Assumed office 3 February 2016
- Constituency: Mon State № 10

Personal details
- Born: 1 January 1974 (age 52) Mudon, Mon State, Myanmar
- Party: National League for Democracy
- Spouse: Nwe Thiri Hlaing
- Children: Htet Lin; Ye Yint Aung
- Parent(s): Nge Lar (father); Daw Yi (mother)
- Education: G.T.I (second year)

Soe Thiha, also known as Maung Tuu (Burmese: စိုးသီဟ; born 1 January 1974), is a Burmese politician who currently serves as an Amyotha Hluttaw MP for Mon State No. 10 constituency. He is a member of the National League for Democracy.

== Early life and education ==
Soe Thiha was born on 1 January 1974 in Mudon, Mon State, Myanmar. He educated in Government Technical Institute (GTI) in Mawlamyine for second year. He opened tea shop in Paung.

== Political career ==
He is a member of the National League for Democracy. In the 2015 Myanmar general election, he was elected as an Amyotha Hluttaw MP and elected representative from Mon State No. 10 parliamentary constituency.
