= Best Friend (film) =

2020 South Korean film

- Theatrical release poster
- Hangul: 이웃사촌
- RR: Iutsachon
- MR: Iussach'on
- Directed by: Lee Hwan-kyung
- Written by: Lee Hwan-kyung; Yun Pil-jun; Kim Yeong-seok
- Produced by: Yun Jong-ho
- Starring: Jung Woo; Oh Dal-su; Kim Hee-won; Kim Byung-chul
- Cinematography: Hong Jae-sik
- Edited by: Kim Sun-min; Choi Jae-geun
- Music by: Lee Dong-jun
- Production companies: Cinemahub; Fantasy Entertainment
- Distributed by: Little Big Pictures; Trinity Pictures
- Release date: November 25, 2020
- Running time: 130 minutes
- Country: South Korea
- Language: Korean
- Box office: US$2.7 million

Best Friend (Korean: 이웃사촌), also known as Good Neighbor, is a 2020 South Korean comedy-drama film directed by Lee Hwan-kyung, starring Jung Woo, Oh Dal-su, Kim Hee-won, and Kim Byung-chul. The film was released theatrically on November 25, 2020.

== Synopsis ==
Dae-kwon (Jung Woo) is the head of the provincial government team who is unemployed and on the verge of being demoted. He receives a mission with his team members to monitor the family of a politician (Oh Dal-su) who is quarantined at home 24 hours a day upon entering the country from overseas. The wiretapping team members move into a neighboring house undercover and discover new secrets one by one as they monitor all the suspicious sounds and actions of the family, from requests for radio stories to rustling noises in the middle of the night.

== Cast ==
- Jung Woo as Yoo Dae-kwon
- Oh Dal-su as Lee Ui-sik
- Kim Hee-won as Chief Kim
- Kim Byung-chul as Dong-sik
- Lee Yu-bi as Lee Eun-jin
- Cho Hyun-chul as Young-cheol
- Ji Seung-hyun as Dong-hyuk
- Kim Sun-kyung as Young-ja
- Yeom Hye-ran
