= HanCinema =

South Korean film and drama database

Hancinema
- Website type: Online database for movies and dramas
- Available in: English
- Owner: Cédric Collemine
- Website: hancinema.net
- Commercial: Yes
- Registration: Optional
- Launched: August 2003; 23 years ago
- Current status: Active

HanCinema (Korean: 한시네마) is an online South Korean movie and drama database created by Cédric Collemine during the summer of 2003 in Korea. It provides information related to Korean movies, television dramas, actors, and other related information. It is aimed at non–South Korean audiences.

== See also ==
- Internet Movie Database
- Korean Movie Database
