= Minod Moktan =

Nepali activist (d. 2018)

- Occupation(s): Civil rights activist, Singer, Entrepreneur, Social Worker

Minod Moktan, better known as Minu (Korean: 미누) was a Nepali human rights activist and singer. In 2003, he founded the rock band Stop Crackdown, which became a cultural symbol of migrant workers' struggles within the broader social movements of South Korea. Through Stop Crackdown and work with groups such as Migrant Workers TV, Minu advocated for better working conditions and fairer judicial treatment of migrant workers by the South Korean government. In 2009, Minu was deported to Nepal after living in Korea for 18 years.

He was able to return to Korea for the first time in 9 years as an invited guest to the premier of a film about his life and work opened at the DMZ International Documentary Film Festival in Korea. On October 15, 2018, Moktan died suddenly in Nepal from a heart attack. His death was mourned by countless migrant rights and labor activists in Korea as well as cultural activists who have worked with him over the years.

== Arrival in South Korea ==
Minu came to South Korea as an undocumented migrant worker in the early 1990s, using a tourist visa. Minu became prominent for his singing, winning a talent competition on KBS and a writing award from the Ministry of Culture in the late 1990s.

== Stop Crackdown ==
Stop Crackdown is a rock band, founded in 2003 by Minu and a group of migrant workers from Southeast Asia. Their lyrics, typically in Korean, deal with the working conditions in South Korean factories, as well as the discrimination faced by illegal migrants. One song alludes to 1970s activist Jeon Tae-il with the line "Did you think foreign migrant workers were just machines who only work?" Another song, "Payday", is reminiscent of the Korean musical "Light of a Factory" with its lyrics about having one's pay withheld.

Stop Crackdown became a prominent cultural voice of migrant workers, and they frequently appeared at rallies associated with the Minjung movement. Jamie Doucette and Robert Prey emphasize this connection with Minjung, and describe Stop Crackdown as a powerful symbol of migrants' rights. Minu in particular became a prominent figure, speaking often at universities despite his undocumented status.

== Arrest and Deportation ==
In 2004, groups supporting migrant workers came together to form Migrant Workers' Television (MWTV), an organization that produced programs to advocate for pro-migrant policy. As part of the earlier grassroots movements, Stop Crackdown and Minu were part of the initial support for the organization, and Minu anchored the monthly panel program WMV.

On October 8, 2009, Minu was arrested by immigration police as he was entering the MWTV building. He was detained from October 8 until his deportation on October 25. His arrest drew outcry from migrants' groups such as MWTV, as well as Amnesty International, which called on the government to consider his place in South Korean society. Government officials stated that they could not make exceptions for any undocumented migrants. Migrant rights and labor groups, however, pointed out that his deportation was intended to silence MWTV's criticism of government policies.

== Life After Deportation ==
Minod Moktan was the subject of the 2018 documentary Namaste Korea by the director Hyewon JEE. The documentary showed how Minu established himself as a social entrepreneur after his deportation to Nepal and how he still missed Korea. In the film, Minu gets an opportunity to visit Korea again after 7 years away, yet he is turned down entry without leaving the Korean airport. Upon hearing this, his band members decide to visit Minu in Nepal, and they put together a reunion concert there. The film ends with "In memory of Minod "Minu" Moktan 1971 ~ 2018".
