= Topten =

South Korean clothing brand

- Industry: Clothing
- Founded: South Korea (2012)
- Headquarters: Seoul, South Korea
- Website: Official website

Topten (Korean: 탑텐) is a South Korean clothing brand operated by Shinsung Tongsang.

In February 2020, Topten launched Topten Balance, which specializes in yoga & pilates and sportswear.

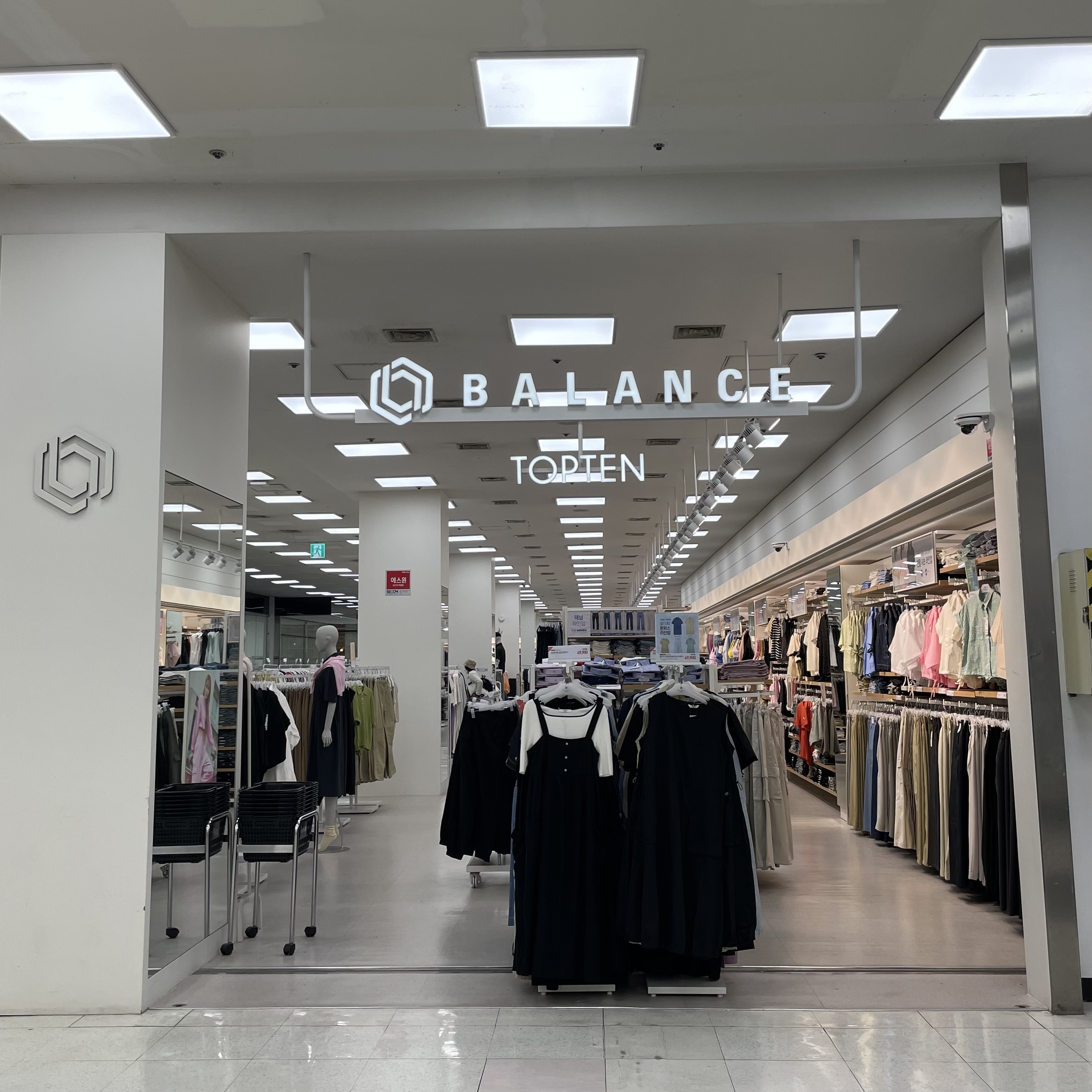
Topten Balance at Lotte Mart in Ilsan.
