= Nagarik App =

Mobile app for Nepali government services for citizens

- Developer: Nepal Government
- Release: December 21, 2019; 6 years ago
- Stable release: 2.0.104 Android 2.0.104 iOS / May 26, 2026; 4 months ago
- Operating system: Android, iOS
- Platform: Mobile, Web
- Available in: Nepali, English
- Website: nagarikapp.gov.np

Nagarik App (translation: Citizen App) is a mobile application launched by the Government of Nepal to provide government-related services in a single online platform. The app was developed to facilitate an easier, systematic, and simplified delivery of government services to Nepali citizens digitally. The app was launched to play a pivotal role in revolutionizing the way citizens interact with the government. It offers government services through a single unified platform, minimizing the need for citizens to navigate multiple channels or physical offices for their diverse needs of government services. The services are added gradually according to the needs and services required. The government aims to reduce the physical queues and the need to be physically present to get services from the different government offices. One can get services online round-the-clock even during holidays. As of now, 25 services are included in the app, ranging from Police Clearance Report to Voters Card.

The app contains and provides a vast range of government services. The app was launched on the occasion of the fourth National Information and Communication Technology Day, 2021 (2078 BS). The event marked a significant milestone in Nepal’s digital transformation journey. It aims to reduce all the bureaucratic hurdles that the citizens have been facing and make government services more efficient and convenient.

In Oct 20, 2024, a E-Chalan was introduced for managing traffic violations in initially piloting in Kathmandu Valley. The Kathmandu Valley Traffic Police Office announced that physical licenses would no longer be confiscated for traffic rule violations. Instead, a "Digital Chit (E-Chalan)" system was implemented, allowing drivers to pay fines electronically. Integrated with the NagarikApp, the system enables police to access drivers' licenses, record violations, and update details directly in the app.

== Features and Services ==
- Inland Revenue Department (Nepal) PAN Registration
- National Identity Card Details
- Election Commission (Nepal) Voter Card Pre-Registration and Details
- Nepal Police Online Clearance Report
- Traffic Violations and Fine Payment
- Nepal Passport, Driving License, National Identity Card (NID), Citizenship, and Voter ID link details
- My Municipality (Includes contact info of the representatives, services such as ambulance, nearby police, and budget programs and plans)
- The Government Press ID card
- PF/PAN/SST/CIT statements can be viewed
- Nagarik Pahichan Dwar (Online bank accounts can be opened and KYC can be verified for selected banks using the QR)

== Awards and honors ==
Each year, World Summit Award honors outstanding digital applications and solutions across various categories. The winners of the World Summit Award represent the pinnacle of innovation in their respective categories. Nagarik App was selected among 180 participants and won the World Summit Award of 2022 in Government and Citizen Engagement category.

== See also ==
- MoFA Mitra
