= MoFA Mitra =

Nepalese embassy app

- Developer: Ministry of Foreign Affairs, Nepal
- Release: May 26, 2026; 3 months ago
- Operating system: Android, iOS
- Platform: Mobile application
- Available in: 2 languages
- List of languages Nepali, English
- Type: Consular services, emergency assistance
- License: Proprietary

MoFA Mitra is a mobile application launched by the Ministry of Foreign Affairs of Nepal to provide digital consular services, emergency support, rescue coordination, and complaint registration facilities for Nepali citizens living and working abroad.

The application allows Nepali migrant workers, students, tourists, and Non-Resident Nepalis (NRNs) to access embassy services, emergency help, and official information directly from their smartphones.

== Background ==
The need for a centralized digital support platform for Nepalis abroad had been discussed for several years due to increasing complaints related to labor exploitation, rescue delays, documentation problems, and lack of communication with Nepali diplomatic missions. Media organizations and migrant rights advocates had continuously highlighted issues faced by Nepali workers abroad, including human trafficking, fraudulent recruitment, delayed repatriation, and difficulties in receiving emergency assistance. In response, the Ministry of Foreign Affairs developed the MoFA Mitra app to digitize complaint handling, improve communication between embassies and citizens, and make emergency response faster and more accessible.

== Features ==
The app includes several services and features for Nepali citizens abroad, including complaint registration, rescue coordination, embassy communication, and digital consular support services.

Features of the application include:

- Online complaint registration
- Emergency rescue request system
- Direct contact with Nepali embassies and consulates
- Digital consular information
- Passport and document-related assistance
- Labor and migration support information
- Emergency hotline access
- Real-time notifications and alerts
- Location-based embassy information
- Tracking and coordination support for stranded citizens

According to reports, the application was designed to simplify access to diplomatic services and strengthen emergency response coordination for Nepalis abroad.

== Launch ==
The application was officially launched by Nepal’s Ministry of Foreign Affairs in Kathmandu in May 2026.

Government officials stated that the app would strengthen Nepal’s digital governance system and improve support mechanisms for Nepali citizens residing overseas.

Officials said the platform would help improve communication between Nepali diplomatic missions and citizens during emergencies and rescue operations.

== Reception ==
The launch of the app received positive coverage from Nepali and international media outlets.

Commentators described the initiative as a significant step toward modernization of Nepal’s diplomatic and consular services and digital governance infrastructure.

Some observers also emphasized the importance of effective implementation, rapid response mechanisms, and continuous monitoring to ensure practical benefits for migrant workers abroad.

== See also ==
- Nagarik App
