= Nepalese passport =

Passport of the Federal Democratic Republic of Nepal issued to Nepali citizens

Nepalese passport; नेपाली राहदानी
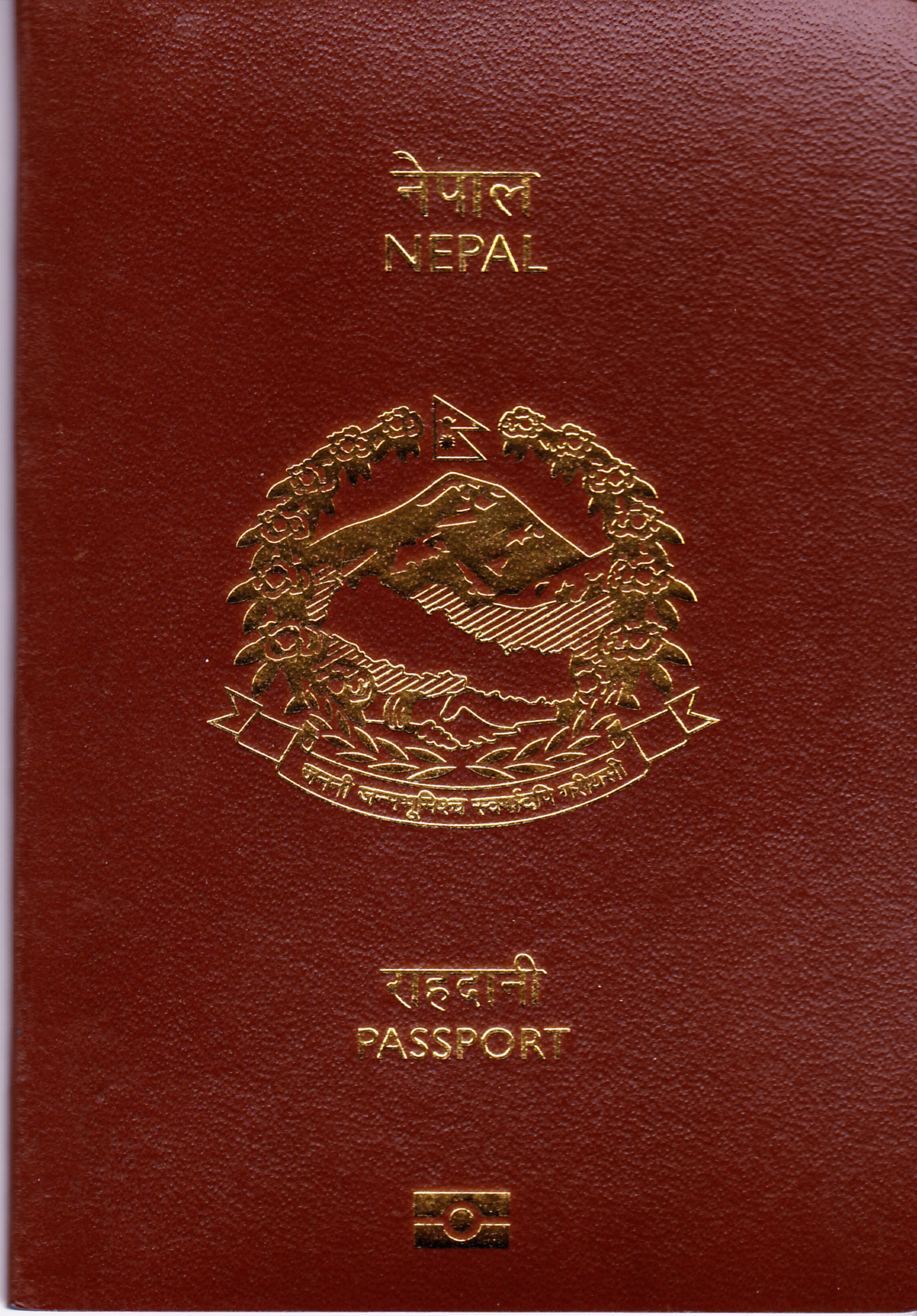
- The front cover of a Nepalese biometric passport
- Type: Passport
- Issued by: Ministry of Foreign Affairs
- Purpose: Identification
- Eligibility: Nepalese citizenship
- Expiration: 10 years from the date of issuance
- Cost: Rs. 5,000 (adult 34 pages), Rs. 10,000 (adult 64 pages), Rs. 12,000 (Fast track service, 34 pages)

A Nepalese passport (Nepali: नेपाली राहदानी) is a travel document issued from the Ministry of Foreign Affairs of the Nepal to Nepali citizens for the purpose of international travel. The Department of Passport (DoP), a department under the Ministry of Foreign Affairs functions as the issuing authority and is responsible for issuing Nepalese passports on application to all eligible Nepali citizens. It enables the bearer to travel internationally and serves as proof of Nepali citizenship.

== History ==
=== Early passports ===
The early passports in Nepal were used for internal and external travel for religious and business purposes. The oldest passport in Nepal is a handwritten passport issued in 1957 BS to a person named Kaliprasad (no surname disclosed) and history ten porters to travel to Butwal and Taulihawa from Kathmandu. The passport holder is identified with their physical description because there was no photography available at that time. A guarantor was needed to issue the passport. These old passports are showcased in the passport museum in Kathmandu.

=== Modern passports ===
The modern passports were issued in 2012 BS (1955/1956). The first of this kind was issued in 10 Shrawan 2012 BS (25 July 1955) which was issued by the secretary of the ministry. These passports were in a form of sheet paper. The booklet form of the passport was issued in the 1960s. It is estimated that about 1 lakh passport was issued in sheet paper form. Up to 2052 BS (1995/1996), all passports were issued in Kathmandu only. This was changed in 2052 BS to issue a passport from five development regions as per government's policy of decentralization.

=== Machine readable passport (MRP) ===
As a member of International Civil Aviation Organization (ICAO) Nepal was obliged to issue machine-readable passports (MRP) after 2010. Nepal stopped issuing hand-written passports on 31 March 2010.

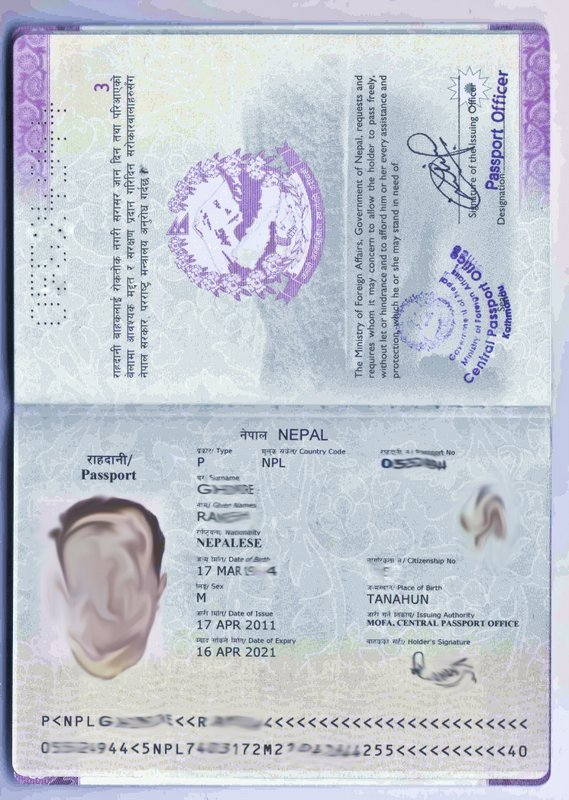
MRP information page

=== Electronic passport ===
On 17 November 2021, the first electronic passport, or e-passport was introduced and Nepalese writer Satya Mohan Joshi was the first to receive the e-passport.

The Nepalis e-passports are produced by IDEMIA, the software that the Passport office uses is also from the same company.

=== Other forms of passport ===
Nepali New E-Passport

All traditional hand written passports were honoured as a bona fide travel document issued by the Nepalese Government until 24 November 2015. All traditional passports are withdrawn from circulation as of November 2015.

== Design ==
Ordinary Nepalese passports are chocolate brown in colour with a chip symbol on their cover, which is commonly known as e-passport. It has Coat of arms of Nepal emblazoned in the center of the front cover. The words Nepali: "राहदानी" and "नेपाल " are inscribed above the coat of arms and words English: "PASSPORT" and "NEPAL" are inscribed below the coat of arms. The ordinary e-passport contains either 34 pages or 66 pages.

Each passport contains a note in English from the foreign ministry that is addressed to the authorities of all other states, identifying the bearer as a citizen of that state and requesting that he or she be allowed to pass and be treated according to international norms. The note inside Nepalese passport says:

The Ministry of Foreign Affairs request and require in the name of Government of Nepal all those whom it may concern to allow the bearer to pass freely without let or hindrance, and to afford him or her every assistance and protection of which he or she may stand in need of.

Current e-passport contains the following data:

- Type
- Passport Number
- Surname
- Given Names
- Nationality
- Date of Birth
- Gender
- Date of Issue
- Date of Expiry
- Citizenship/ National Identity Number
- Place of Birth
- Issuing Authority
- Holder's Signature

== Types of passports ==
There are 4 different types of passports issued by the government of Nepal. These are ordinary, official, diplomatic and travel documents. These passports are distinguished by their cover. The cover of ordinary e-passports is chocolate-brown. Diplomatic e-passports have a crimson-red cover, official e-passports navy-blue, and peacekeepers' e-passports are tiger-orange colour.

== Issuance of passport ==
=== Fees ===
As of 2022, an ordinary e-passports is issued for NPR 5,000 (adult 34 pages), NPR 10,000 (adult 66 pages), NPR 12,000 (Fast track service, 34 pages), NPR 20,000 (Fast track service, 66 pages). Applicants for Nepalese passports are required to pay the authorised passport issuing office a sum of NPR 15000 or NPR 12,000 for issuance of passport on same day of application or for the day after the day of application respectively. Or, the sum of 10,000.00 (US$90.76 As of 15 July 2019) as fees for an Ordinary passport for urgent processing which takes 3–4 business day and NPR 5,000 for normal processing. Urgent processing is done by the ministry of foreign affairs and takes 2 to 3 days. Normal processing takes around 4 weeks but sometime it may take up to 6 weeks and is done from the Chief District officer's office. However, the Official and the Diplomatic passports are exempted from fees.

=== Validity period ===
The passports are valid for 10 years from the date of issue and are issued by the Central Passport Office, District Administration Office in all 77 district headquarters as well as Nepalese embassies and consulates abroad. However, as per new regulation, validity is for 5 years in case of minor under 10 years of age.

== Visa requirements ==
Countries and territories with visa-free entries or visas on arrival for holders of regular Nepalese passports Nepal Visa-free Visa on arrival Electronic authorization or eVisa Visa available both on arrival or online Visa required

In 2024, Nepalese citizens have visa-free or visa on arrival access to 39 countries and territories, ranking the Nepalese passport 101st in the world according to the Henley Passport Index.

In accordance with the Indo-Nepal Treaty of Peace and Friendship Nepali citizens do not need passports to travel to India, and are permitted to live, work, and study.

== Issues with Passport Distribution ==
- Complaints of long lines at Babarmahal Passport Office are common as of January, 2023. This the passport office claims is because of very high demand and insufficient capacity in printing and distribution of completed passports.
- Passport distribution disruption: Passport printing and distribution was halted since 3 January 2023 Passport office claimed it as a software issue and that technicians from IDEMIA (passport and passport software provider) are looking into it. Passport distribution was resumed 7 January 2023.

== Gallery ==
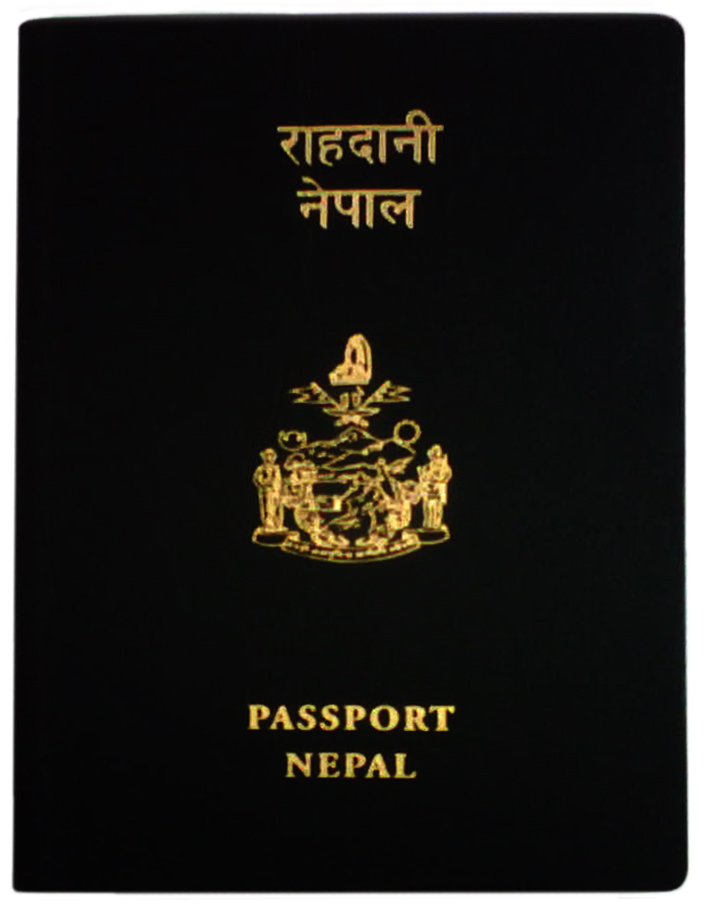
Cover of Nepali Passport (Old)

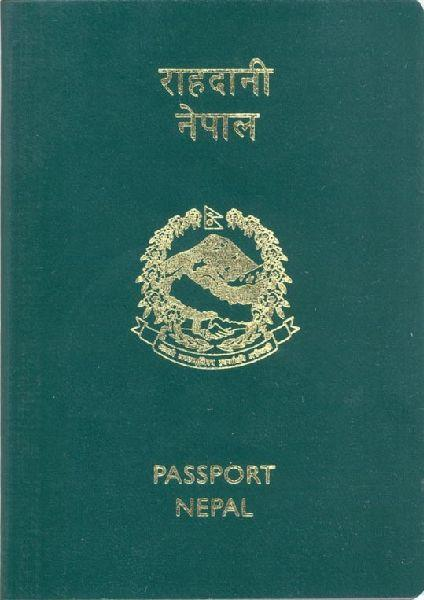
Cover of Nepali Machine Readable Passport (MRP-Old)

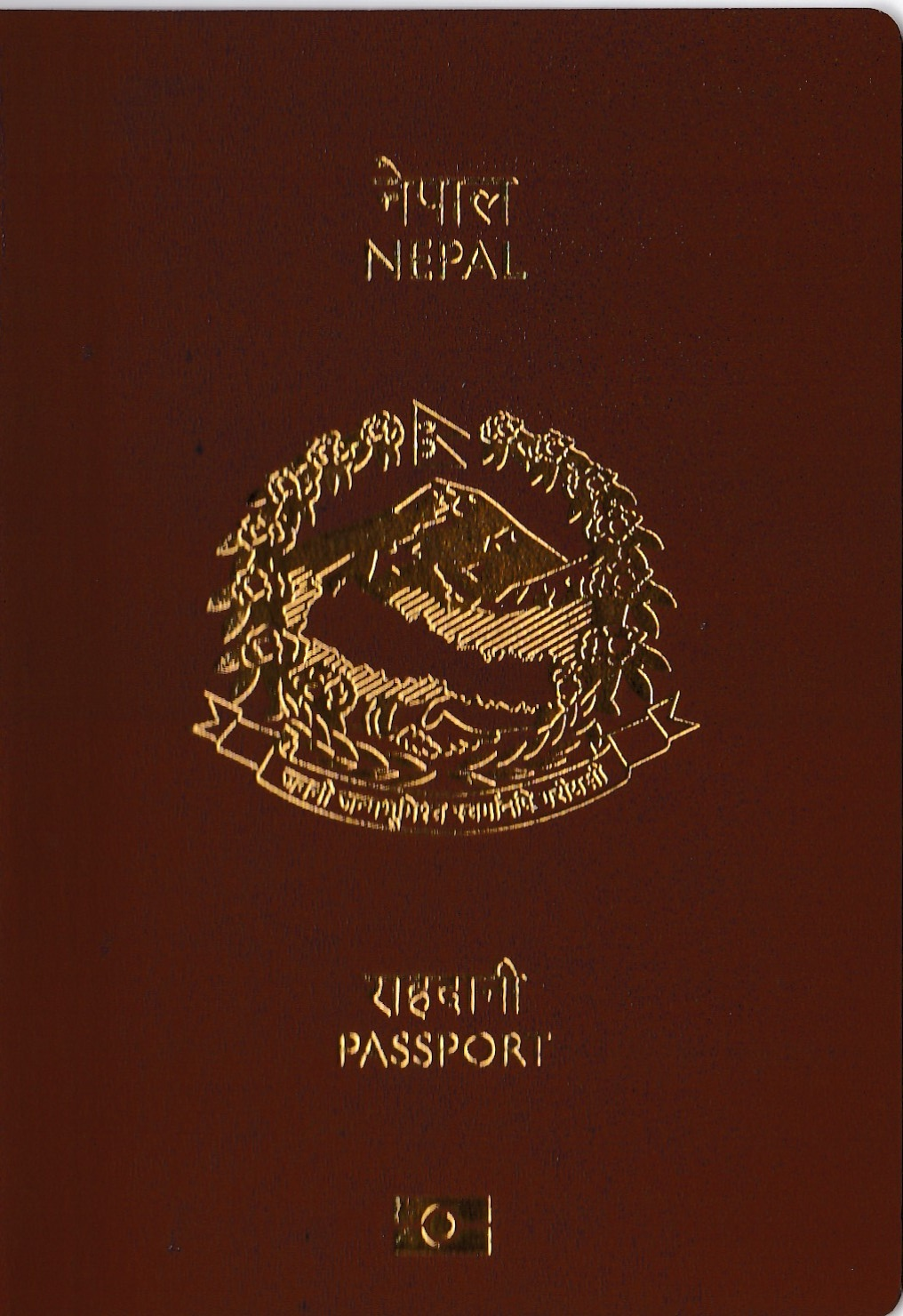
Cover of Nepali E-passport (New)

== See also ==
- Department of Passport (Nepal)
- Visa policy of Nepal
- Visa requirements for Nepalese citizens
- National Identity Card (Nepal)
