= Surinamese nationality law =

Surinamese nationality law is regulated by the 1987 Constitution, the Allocation Agreement of 1975, and the 2014 Surinamese Nationality Law. It is highly influenced by Dutch law. These statutes determine who is, or is eligible to be, a citizen of Suriname. The legal means to acquire nationality, formal membership in a nation, differ from the relationship of rights and obligations between a national and the nation, known as citizenship. Surinamese nationality is typically obtained either under the rules of jus sanguinis, i.e. birth to at least one parent with Surinamese nationality; or on the principle of jus soli, i.e. by birth in Suriname. It can also be granted to a permanent resident who has lived in Suriname for a given period of time or by presidential decree through naturalization.

== Acquiring Surinamese nationality ==
Surinamese may acquire nationality through birth or naturalization. Upon finalization of adoption of a minor by the courts, a child automatically becomes Surinamese. A special procedure, known as "option", is provided to facilitate acquisition of nationality for those who have lost their Surinamese nationality through marriage or renunciation.

=== By birth right ===
- Those born, who are legitimate or have been formally legitimized, to at least one Surinamese parent. (Note: A revision to the Civil Code, under consideration in 2009, and passed in 2011, eliminated the institution of legitimation, replacing it with a judicial process of determining paternity.)
- Those born within the territory of Suriname, including foundlings of unknown parentage, except children who may have been granted another nationality at birth. An exception in the law grants automatic nationality for those who were born in and had an established domicile in Suriname at the time of independence in 1975.
- Those who are adopted as minors in an international adoption which conforms to the established procedures, or those adopted within the country, automatically become nationals upon finalization of the adoption.

=== By naturalization ===
There are three categories of naturalization in Suriname: general, state interest, and option.

==== General naturalization ====
Applicants must pay fees to naturalize and must produce evidence that if naturalization produced dual nationality that it is not prohibited by the other affiliation. The Department of Alien Affairs (Dutch: Vreemdelingenzake) processes applications of naturalization. After obtaining an admission visa for approved long-term stay, applicants must register in the Civil Registry. Naturalization is granted by a legislative Act. Those eligible for general naturalization include:

- Persons who have previously lost Surinamese nationality;
- Foreigners who have established a five-year domicile in Suriname; or
- Persons who were born to parents who were stateless or had unknown nationality.

==== State interest ====
Those who apply for naturalization under this category are exempt from application fees and residency requirements. They have ties to Suriname which are beneficial to the nation and are required to demonstrate Naturalization is typically granted by legislative Act; however, in some instances applicants in this category can be approved by presidential decree. To qualify for naturalization by presidential decree, applicants must demonstrate that they are of the age of majority; domiciled in Suriname; have renounced or are willing to renounce any other nationality; and that they are not a threat to "public order, morals, and health, or to the safety of the State". Those who are eligible under presidential decree include:

- A Surinamese mother who wishes to obtain nationality for minor children born from a prior marriage, to a deceased father, or for whom the father is unknown, who has domiciled in Suriname for a minimum of one year;
- Foreign or stateless persons born in Suriname;
- Foreign or stateless persons who were previously Surinamese nationals;
- Foreign or stateless persons born abroad to at least one parent who was a birthright national of Suriname; or
- Persons who reside in Suriname and are classified as a "Person of Surinamese Origin" (Dutch: Persoon van Surinaamse Afkomst, PSA), meaning they do not have Surinamese nationality but at least one of their parents or grandparents were born in Suriname.

==== Option ====
Certain persons who do not have, or have lost Surinamese nationality, may reacquire it by making a declaration to authorities under the processes described in law. Those eligible for this process include:

- Persons born to residents of Suriname at the time of their birth, who have resided for at least three years before attaining age eighteen, may elect Surinamese nationality by declaration within one year of turning eighteen.
- Persons who lost Surinamese nationality as the result of actions of their legal parent or guardian when they were a minor, may repatriate by declaration within one year of attaining age eighteen.
- Persons who renounced Surinamese nationality upon reaching the age of eighteen, but want to repatriate before their twenty-second birthday may elect Surinamese nationality by declaration.
- Foreign spouses of Surinamese nationals, who were either: (1) married to a national at the time of marriage and time of declaration, and who had been married and established a domicile for a minimum of two years prior to the declaration; (2) who were married and had themselves lived in Suriname for at least five years prior to the declaration; or (3) who had offspring with the Surinamese national prior to the declaration.
- A spouse who lost nationality upon marriage with a foreigner may regain Surinamese nationality by declaration upon the dissolution of the marriage.

== Loss of Surinamese nationality ==
Nationality may be lost by the voluntary acquisition of another nationality, military service which was unapproved by the President of Suriname, failure to renounce foreign nationality if required to obtain naturalization by presidential decree, or voluntary renunciation.

== Dual nationality ==
The Act creating the category "Person of Surinamese Origin" and discussion of dual nationality for people living abroad who are of Surinamese origin have sparked debate regarding dual nationality, but as of 2014, no changes had been made in this regard to the migration laws.

== History ==
Spanish, British, and Dutch traders established temporary settlements in the territory that would be known as Dutch Guiana in the late 16th century. The British colony of Suriname was ceded to the Dutch in 1667 in exchange for New Amsterdam. It was managed by the States of Zeeland until 1682, when the administration passed to the Dutch West India Company. The Company quickly sold one-third to the city of Amsterdam and one-third to Cornelis van Aerssen van Sommelsdijck, creating a proprietorship named the Society of Suriname in 1683. Roman-Dutch law served as the legal code of the colony, and there was no national civil law defining the rights and obligations of inhabitants. In 1809, King Louis Napoleon ordered that the Netherlands adopt a modification of the Civil Code of France, which was replaced two years later with the French Code. Attempts to draft a new code, after the Netherlands regained independence in 1813, were unsuccessful until 1838. Under the variations of the civil code, married women were legally incapacitated, dependent upon their husbands, and automatically derived the nationality of their husbands. The Civil Code of 1838 provided that persons born in the Netherlands or its colonies were Dutch nationals.

The Nationality Act of 1850 made distinctions between who were entitled to rights, differentiating between those born in the Netherlands or descended of Dutch citizens, who had political rights, and those who were native inhabitants in Dutch colonies, who were excluded from rights. In 1863 slavery was abolished, but migration of black workers away from plantations resulted in the import of indentured workers from British India and the Dutch East Indies, which continued into the 1940s. The Law on Dutch Citizenship and Residence (Dutch: Wet of het Nederlanderschap en het ingezetenschap) was drafted in 1892, which required that from 1 July 1893 place of birth was irrelevant, as those entitled to Dutch nationality were derived from having a Dutch father and being legitimate or legitimized. Because of the 1892 law, Suriname had no defined nationality scheme until 1927, when the 1910 Act which had been proscribed for the Dutch East Indies was extended to the other Dutch colonies. Under this regime, people residing in Dutch colonies were given a status known as "Dutch Subject, non-Dutch national".

In 1951, the "Dutch Subject, non-Dutch national" scheme was repealed in Suriname and the provisions of the 1892 Law on Dutch Citizenship and Residence were implemented. Retroactively from 1949, according to the Allocation Agreement, the law of 1951 restored Dutch nationality to most Surinamese. Article 5 of the 1892 law required that married women derive their nationality from their husbands. Meaning that foreign women who married Dutch nationals gained Dutch nationality, while Dutch women who married foreigners lost Dutch nationality. The law had been modified in 1936 to provide that if a Dutch woman would become stateless by marriage, because her husband's country did not automatically bestow nationality at marriage, she could retain her Dutch nationality. Women whose nationality had been effected by marriage could regain their original nationality only when the marriage had been terminated, by declaring that they wanted to restore or renounce their husband's nationality to the proper authorities within one year of the dissolution of the marriage. In 1954, the Dutch government authorized the naturalization of Indonesians living in Suriname.

In 1964, the Dutch Nationality Act was revised to comply with the terms of the Convention on the Nationality of Married Women, giving women individual nationality. For a one year period after the revised law passed, women who had previously lost their nationality through marriage could repatriate by making a declaration to the authorities. Another provision of the law change meant that naturalization of a man no longer automatically resulted in a change of his wife's nationality. In 1972, a commission was appointed to determine nationality requirements ahead of proposed independence for Suriname. The scheme defined those who were entitled to Surinamese nationality as Dutch nationals over 18 who had been born in Suriname and resided there at independence; who had a Surinamese father, or in the case paternity was unproven, a Surinamese mother; who were born abroad to a Surinamese father, or in the case of a non-legitimized child to a Surinamese mother, but who were residing in the territory at independence; or aliens residing in Suriname at the time of independence.

In 1975, Suriname gained independence from the Netherlands and adopted its own nationality criteria enshrined in the Law on Surinamese Nationality and Residence (Dutch: Wet van 24 november 1975 tot regeling van het Surinamerschap en het Ingezetenschap) Under the terms of the law and its implementation agreement, Article 3 provided that Dutch nationals born in Suriname and residing in Suriname at independence were Surinamese and lost their Dutch nationality. Other Dutch nationals living in Suriname had the option of obtaining Surinamese nationality if they were living in Suriname at the time of independence and expressed a desire to become nationals. According to a ruling by the High Court of Justice of Suriname that year, people who were born in Suriname, but living abroad at the time of independence, retained Dutch nationality. Minor children at the time of independence derived the nationality of their fathers unless their paternity was legally undetermined, in which case their nationality was derived from their mother. In 1980, an amendment to the Law on Nationality permitted naturalization procedures for those of Surinamese origin who were not nationals.

In 2014, a broad revision was adopted to the Law on Nationality to address the lack of gender equality in transferring nationality to children, regulation of dual citizenship, lack of processes to prevent statelessness, and a policy to regulate repatriation. The bill, adopted on 10 July, provided that as long as one of a child's parents were Surinamese at the time of the child's birth, the child had Surinamese nationality. It also eased the processes of dual citizenship, allowed recognition of birth in Suriname to grant nationality if the child would otherwise become stateless, and allowed husbands of Surinamese wives to derive her nationality.
