= Institute of Foreign Affairs =

Nepalese think tank

Institute of Foreign Affairs (IFA), Nepal
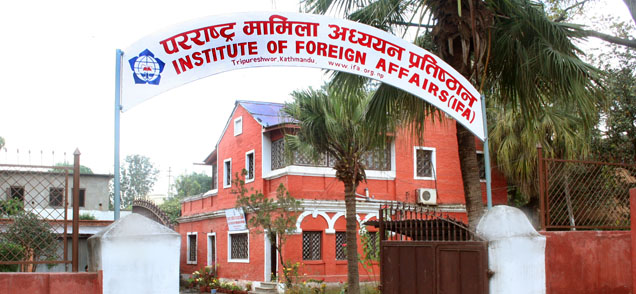
- Building of Institute of Foreign Affairs (IFA)
- Abbreviation: IFA
- Formation: 1993; 33 years ago
- Type: Policy research think tank
- Location: Tripureshwor, Kathmandu, Nepal
- Website: ifa.org.np

Institute of Foreign Affairs, Nepal (Nepali: परराष्ट्र मामिला अध्ययन प्रतिष्ठान), abbreviated as IFA, is a policy research think tank patronized by Ministry of Foreign Affairs, Nepal.

Minister of Foreign Affairs heads the board of directors of the institute and presently, Mr. Rajesh Shrestha is the executive director, and Dr. Rupak Sapkota is assigned as a deputy executive director of the institute.
