= Libyan nationality law =

Provisions of Libyan Nationality

Libyan House of Representatives
- Long title: Provisions of Libyan Nationality Law No. 24 of 2010
- Enacted by: Libyan Government of National Unity
- Status: Current legislation

Libyan nationality law is regulated by the Constitution of Libya, as amended; the Libyan Nationality Law, and its revisions; and various international agreements to which the country is a signatory. These laws determine who is, or is eligible to be, a national of Libya. The legal means to acquire nationality, formal legal membership in a nation, differ from the domestic relationship of rights and obligations between a national and the nation, known as citizenship. Nationality describes the relationship of an individual to the state under international law, whereas citizenship is the domestic relationship of an individual and the nation. Libyan nationality is typically obtained under the principle of jus soli, i.e. by birth in Libya, or jus sanguinis, born to parents with Libyan nationality. It can be granted to persons with an affiliation to the country, or to a permanent resident who has lived in the country for a given period of time through naturalization.

== Acquisition of nationality ==
Nationality can be acquired in Libya at birth or later in life through naturalization.

=== By birth ===
Those who acquire nationality at birth include:

- Children born anywhere whose father is Libyan; however, if born abroad, the birth must be registered with the proper authorities;
- Children born anywhere, who are illegitimate or whose father has unknown nationality or is stateless and whose mother is Libyan, or whose father is foreign and whose mother is Libyan, following an administrative process and at the discretion of the state; or (Note: Human Rights Watch specifically noted that the 2010 legislation Section 11 does not specify how a Libyan woman married to a foreign man with known nationality can pass on her nationality to her children nor does it specify what process is to be followed to acquire nationality in Section 3 to an unknown or stateless father, stating only that provisions will be developed. The Belgian Office of the Commissioner General for Refugees and Stateless Persons reviewed Libyan legislation in 2014 and could find no statutes which would verify provisions had been implemented for children to acquire nationality maternally. Both sources noted that sections 3 and 11 appear to contradict each other.)
- Abandoned children or orphans discovered in the territory whose parents are unknown.

=== By naturalization ===
Naturalization can be granted to persons who have resided in the territory for a sufficient period of time to confirm they understand the customs and traditions of the society. General provisions are that applicants have good character and conduct; have no criminal convictions; have good mental and physical health without disabilities; can economically be self-sufficient; lawfully entered the country and are under age fifty. Applicants must have resided in the country for ten years. Adoptions are not allowed in Libya, and there are no provisions for adoptees to acquire nationality in the statutes. Minor children are unable to acquire naturalization when their father naturalizes. Besides foreigners meeting the criteria, other persons who may be naturalized include:

- The wife of a Libyan national after two years of marriage; or (Note: Foreign husbands have no similar privileged ability to obtain nationality through marriage and if a Libyan woman is married to a Palestinian husband, he is barred from obtaining nationality entirely.)
- Persons who have provided significant service to the nation without meeting other requirements.

== Loss of nationality ==
Libyan nationals of origin cannot renounce their nationality. Nationals of origin may be denaturalized in Libya for residing outside of the country for more than two years or for acquiring dual nationality without obtaining government authorization, or for minor children if their parent is denaturalized. Naturalized persons may lose their nationality by performing actions against state interests; committing serious crimes, disloyal acts, or crimes against the state or state security; for residing abroad without permission of the state; or for fraud, misrepresentation, or concealment in a naturalization petition.

== Dual nationality ==
Limited Dual nationality has been allowed in Libya with permission of the state since 1954.

== History ==
From ancient times, Libya was populated by Berber, Garamantian, Haratin, Tebu, and Tuareg peoples who resided in remote areas outside the influences of Cyrenaica, Fezzan, or Tripolitania. The Greeks invaded Cyrenaica in 632 BCE, followed by the Roman invasion of Tripolitania in 146 BCE. Arabs began conquering all three historic regions, Cyrenaica, Fezzan, and Tripolitania from 644 CE. Chieftains dominated the region and individuals were tied to them by kinship networks and religion. Cyrenaica was claimed by the Mamluk Sultanate of Egypt, but little control from the sultan was exerted in the region. Tripolitania was ruled by a succession of leaders of the Maghribi dynasty and Fezzan was governed by the theocratic kingdom of the Beni Khattab dynasty. In 1510, Spanish forces captured Tripoli and sacked the city. Three years later, they turned its defense over to the Knights of St. John of Malta, who in turn were ousted by Sinan Pasha in 1551 placing the area under the rule of the Ottoman Empire.

=== Ottoman period (1551–1911) ===
After Ottoman Tripolitania was established in 1551, the Ottomans expanded their control in the region bringing the Fezzan leaders under their allegiance in the 1580s. Though authority was not extended to Cyrenaica, the Ottomans established a government agent from Tripoli in Benghazi in the seventeenth century. Within the Ottoman Empire, for six centuries, there was an internal organization that defined government functions for subjects by balancing religious and communal ties, weighing aptitudes and occupations without a centralized national ideology. Ottoman subjecthood was strongly tied to religion and non-Muslims, if they were ahl al-Kitāb (People of the Book), meaning Jewish, Christian, or Zoroastrian, could benefit from being subjects by agreeing to pay a tax to the sultan. Under a pact known as zimma, in exchange for paying taxes, the sultan allowed these subjects freedom of religion and guaranteed their lives, property, and rights with an understanding that they were legally entitled to less status than Muslim subjects. The pact was agreed to by the leaders of the confessional community, who managed the adherents and their internal organization under the religious law of their community.

By the eighteenth century a political organization, known as the millet, managed the affairs of their respective religious communities and developed into the protégé system (Turkish: beratlılar, protected persons). Signing treaties with European powers, from the 1673 signing of a Capitulation with France, the Ottoman Empire granted France control of certain Ottoman Christians, Austria control of some Ottoman Roman Catholics, most favoured nation status to British and Dutch traders, as well as specific rights to the Republic of Venice and Russian Empire. Under the terms of these treaties, foreign powers could recruit Ottoman subjects to serve their needs as commercial agents, consuls, or interpreters, and extend to these protégés diplomatic immunity from prosecution and privileges of trade, including lowered customs tariffs. Over time, abuses of the system led to a virtual monopoly of foreign trade by protégés, clandestine sales of letters patent (Turkish: berats), and demands from foreign powers for protection to extend from individuals to entire communities. The influence on Ottoman subjects by European powers changed the perception of these minority groups in the empire, meaning that they were increasingly seen not as Ottoman subjects, but as resident aliens. In 1798, France and Britain's conflicts during the Napoleonic Wars extended into Egypt. France occupied the territory until 1801, when the French were defeated and Britain set about assisting the Ottoman Empire in regaining its sovereignty.

To curb the disruptive effects of Europeans in the empire, from 1806, the Ottoman government began sending communiques to the foreign embassies demanding compliance with the terms of their agreements. Ottoman control was re-established in Libya by 1835 and they implemented policies to control the authority of tribal chiefs in the territory. Failing to achieve success diplomatically, in 1839, the Ottoman government issued the Edict of Gülhane, in an effort to end bribery and corruption, and to create fair tax schemes and institutions to protect the basic rights of Ottoman subjects. The Ottoman Reform Edict of 1856 (Turkish: Islâhat Fermânı) categorized subjects by whether they were Muslim or non-Muslim, granting different civil statuses to each. In 1863, new regulations upon protégés restricted the privileges they received in the empire and clarifying who were thereafter considered to be Ottoman subjects and who were foreigners.

To further define subjects of the Ottoman Empire, new nationality legislation was passed in 1869 (tâbiiyet-i osmaniye kanunnamesi, Ottoman Nationality Law). (Note: Will Hanley, a history professor at Florida State University, notes that the etymology of tâbiiyet includes associations with allegiance, nationality, and subjecthood, or an affiliation to a sovereign, but does not translate as citizenship.) The law specified terms for the acquisition and loss of who was within the sovereignty of the empire, rather than the domestic obligations and rights of citizenship. It described who was a subject, owing allegiance, and made provisions for wives, children, emigrants and immigrants. Under its terms, children derived nationality from their fathers, foreigners born in the territory could acquire nationality at majority, and foreigners born elsewhere could obtain nationality after five years residency within the imperial realm. In 1869, the Empire issued two memoranda to foreign consuls and provincial governors to explain that the law would follow custom regarding the age of majority in each region and clarified that the authority for denaturalization belonged to the central authority. It reiterated that the law was crafted with existing treaties in mind, and was therefore not retroactive legislation which might impact European agreements or Ottoman sovereignty.

The 1869 Nationality Law remained in place until 1909. Under its terms children acquired Ottoman nationality from their father, unless they were illegitimate and then derived it from their mother. If an Ottoman wife was married, her children obtained nationality through their father. Foreigners residing in Ottoman territory were considered to be subjects of the Empire, regardless of where they might have originated. Specific provisions included that foundlings discovered within the territory; stateless persons living in the empire; Muslim women, who despite the ban on such marriages, had married Persian men and the children of such a union; unregistered persons who had not been counted in the Ottoman census, either because no census was taken or their births were unregistered, were all considered to be Ottoman. Foreign women acquired Ottoman nationality through marriage, but could return to their original nationality upon the death of their spouse. Nationality could also be granted based on special contribution or service to the nation. Dual nationality was permitted, but was discouraged, as the government could choose not to recognize naturalization of an Ottoman subject by another state.

Since the unification of Italy in 1870, there was an Italian drive to acquire colonial possessions. Having been unable to secure a protectorate in Tunisia, which was annexed by France in 1881, Italians focused on purchasing the Assab Bay in Eritrea in 1882. They extended a protectorate over a portion of Somalia in 1889 and attempted to extend their rule into Ethiopia in 1896, but were defeated. In 1908, when the Young Turks rebelled against the authoritarian rule of the Ottoman sultan Abdulhamid II, a period of instability followed and the Italians took advantage of the disorder in the Empire. Seeing control of Libya as a chance to dominate the sea route between Gibraltar and the Suez Canal, the Italian army was mobilized to invade Libya on 19 September 1911. By 8 July 1912, Italy controlled all of the major Libyan ports that had been under Ottoman control and peace talks began in Lausanne, Switzerland four days later. On 18 October, under the terms of the Treaty of Lausanne, Italy was ceded Cyrenaica and Tripolitania and required to return the Turkish islands of Dodecanese. Knowing the Ottoman Empire was too weak to contest their actions, Italy annexed all three areas.

=== Italian Libya (1911–1942) ===
Italian Cyrenaica and Italian Tripolitania were established in 1911, and Italy occupied the Dodecanese islands until the beginning of World War I. During the war, with support from the Ottoman Empire, the colonies rebelled reducing the territory controlled by the Italians. In an attempt to regain ground, Italian forces began a series of campaigns in 1919 and were successful in subduing the resistance in 1931, and annexing Fezzan. In 1934, Cyrenaica, Fezzan, and Tripolitania were unified into a single colony, Italian Libya. Italian subjecthood was first declared during the Unification of Italy in 1861. As the states united, their former kingdoms and duchies ceased to exist and no alternative means of belonging had been devised. Thus, in March 1861 the former Savoy-Piedmont-Sardinia Kingdom officially proclaimed that the former Piedmontese subjecthood was extended to the entirety of Italy. Inhabitants were afforded protection based upon their allegiance to the monarchy. Subjecthood was derived from an Italian father, and could only be derived maternally if the father was unknown. Birth in the territory was treated differently in different areas; in some states it conferred subjecthood, and in others it did not. Naturalization and denaturalization processes also varied depending upon the province. In 1865 laws from the various states was codified into national legislation, including a new civil code, which went into force on 1 January 1866.

Under the 1865 Civil Code, unity of the family was a driving foundation of the code, thus the emphasis was on descent. Nationality was derived paternally, regardless of where a child was born, unless the father was unknown. Foundlings born in the territory were presumed to have an Italian father and were granted nationality. Children born in Italy to foreigners who had lived in the territory for ten years, could acquire nationality at majority and those born in the territory to foreigners who did not meet the requisite residency could opt for Italian nationality at majority after service to the nation. Wives were required to follow the nationality of their husband. Italian women married to foreigners lost their Italian nationality and could only reacquire it if the marriage terminated and they established residence in Italy. Foreign women who married Italian men gained Italian nationality and retained it even after termination of the marriage. Nationality provisions were amended by Law 23 of 1901, which allowed children born in the territory or abroad who became foreigners because of a father's loss of nationality to acquire nationality without parliamentary intervention. Law no. 217 (known as Sonnino's Law), passed on 17 May 1906, allowed naturalization by royal decree if the Council of State supported the application and the applicant either resided in Italy or the colonies for six years, or had provided four years of service to the Italian state, or had been married to an Italian woman for three years.

In 1912, Italy introduced new nationality provisions (Law No. 555) to address Italians living outside of the motherland. It did not challenge the tenet of unity of nationality in the family for metropolitan nationals, and bestowed Italian nationality by descent from an Italian father. But, if the child was born abroad in a country that automatically granted its nationality through jus soli, Italian nationality could be renounced at majority. Adding this provision allowed Italy to perpetually recognize the nationality of emigrants and foster a sense of belonging to Italy, even if expatriates chose to no longer act as citizens. For foreigners, it reduced the general residency requirement to five years, or three years if in service to the state. Colonial subjecthood differed from that in the motherland. Immediately upon being colonized by Italy indigenous subjecthood was defined in the nationality laws under a subsection specifically for Libya (Italian: sudditanza degli indigeni della Libia), promulgated by a 1913 decree. Children acquired Italian subjecthood by being born in Libya to parents who were Libyan. Children of Italo-Libyan heritage were immediately granted Italian nationality with all the rights of metropolitan citizenship, as long as they were the legitimate or legitimated child of an Italian father. Marriage by a foreign woman to a Libyan conferred Libyan subject status. Though Libyans did not have the same civil rights as metropolitan citizens, they had more substantial rights than Italian subjects in Eritrea or Somalia. Because the Dodecanese islands were a military occupation and internationally were recognized as Ottoman territory, Dodecanesians continued to be Ottoman subjects and were considered as Italian protected persons.

In 1919, a new designation, Italian Citizens in Tripolitania and Cirenaica (Italian: cittadinanza itlaliana in Tripolitania e Cirenaica, CITC) was developed to grant Libyans more autonomy and broader citizenship as a means of pacification against Arab rebellion, which had arisen in 1914. To attain CITC status, children had to be born in the colony to a Libyan father. Italo-Libyan children derived the status of their father and unity of the family required that women followed their husband's status, meaning if he was Libyan, she was Libyan; if he was Italian, she was Italian; and if he was foreign, she was foreign. A Libyan could naturalize with full metropolitan status after five years of residency in Italy or the colony, if they had served in the Italian Army or Navy, had completed Italian elementary school, served in a government capacity, had received a decoration or title from Italy, or were born to a naturalized CITC with full metropolitan status. Meeting any of those criteria and the residency requirement, to attain full metropolitan status, a CITC had to agree to follow the laws of Italy and give up their personal and customary rights as Libyans. With the collapse of the Ottoman Empire, Italy hastily prepared a naturalization provision in November 1920 to allow Dodecanesians to individually naturalize as Italians, with a status giving them very limited civil rights. The bill passed in 1922, and the Dodocanese islands, under the terms of the 1923 Lausanne Treaty, were formally transferred the territory to Italy in 1924. In 1925, a nationality law extended Aegean Italian Citizenship (Italian: cittadinanza italiana egea) status to Dodecanesians, which was similar to the nationality offered to Libyans.

Between 1922 and 1943, Mussolini's fascist regime expanded its territory in Africa, as well as states in the Mediterranean. Besides Libya, Italian territories included Eritrea, Ethiopia, and Somalia. In 1927, CITC status was renamed as Libyan Italian Citizenship (Italian: cittadinanza italiana libica), though how nationality was acquired did not change. Anti-miscegenation Legislation passed in Italy in 1937, prohibiting concubinage and another promulgated the following year banned formal marriages between metropolitan and native subjects. Mixed marriages became illegal and were punishable with a five-year sentence upon conviction. In 1938, the possibility of Libyan Arabs naturalizing as Italian metropolitan citizens was withdrawn, but the following year a new status "special Italian citizenship" (Italian: cittadinanza italiana special) was introduced. It allowed foreigners to naturalize and gain rights as Libyan Italian Citizens, but no metropolitan status. In 1939 all of Italy's colonies were annexed into the kingdom as metropolitan territory, and the anti-miscegenation legislation was extended to Italo-Libyan couples. Legislation passed in 1940 barred conferring metropolitan status on African mixed-race, illegitimate, legitimate, legitimated children, or children of unknown parentage, unless they had reached age thirteen that year, had been raised as an Italian, and could confirm their good character. Italo-Aegean nationals were considered to be European, thus mixed-race children of the Dodocanese islands were still allowed to obtain metropolitan status.

=== Allied administration of Libya (1942–1951) ===
During World War II, allied forces invaded Libya in November 1942. Though the Italians had treated Libya as one administrative unit, the Allies divided it into three administrative areas – Cyrenaica, Fezzan, and Tripolitania. The British military administered Cyrenaica and Tripolitania as two separate political entities and the Free French forces administered Fezzan. Issuing a proclamation on 11 November 1942, the British forces established a military government for Cyrenaica, with the promise to Sayed Mohammed Idris el Senussi that the territory would not be returned to Italian rule. Italian law remained in force, but as the Italian judiciary personnel had fled, its implementation was problematic and Britain wrote policies directly governing the area. In Tripolitania, Britain established a military government in December 1942. The Tripolianian leadership's support of the Axis powers led to indifference on the part of Britain for the region, and British administrators took little interest in developing infrastructure and the economy or health and educational systems to benefit the populace. Most of the Italian administrators had remained in the area and Britain's policy was to allow them to continue their administration without making reforms.

France began their occupation of Fezzan in January 1943 and assigned the Fezzanese territory to the administrators of Algeria and Tunisia. Their aim was to retain permanent control of the area and they pressed for the three provinces of Libya to be divided into a loose federation so that French influence could continue. In 1943, the Allies invaded Sicily and Italy surrendered. The Dodocanese islands were captured by German forces that year and occupied by Germany until the end of the war. When the war ended in 1945, Britain assumed control over the Dodocanese islands and began making extensive legislative changes to eradicate Fascist doctrines from the islands' policies. The Treaty of Peace with Italy was signed in 1947, leaving the status of Libyans unresolved. They were stripped of Italian nationality but given no new definition of status. The British military occupation was terminated and administration for the Dodocanese islands was transferred to Greek military forces. The islands were integrated into Greece and a proclamation was issued granting all rights recognized under the Greek Constitution for its citizens to the Dodecanesians. They were collectively extended Greek nationality and their children born after their incorporation were considered Greek, unless they chose to remain Italian nationals and were domiciled in Italy. In 1949, over British and French objections, the United Nations, issued resolution 289 A (IV), which ordered that a unified Libya should be granted independence no later than 1 January 1952. A committee was appointed in 1950 to draft the constitution for a federal monarchy under the rule of Idris. The National Assembly approved of the Constitution in October 1951 and independence was declared effectively on 24 December 1951.

=== Post-independence (1951–present) ===
Under the 1951 Constitution, Article 8 provided that persons who had no other nationality were conferred Libyan nationality at independence if they were born in Libya, born to Libyan parents, or had normally lived in Libya for ten years prior to 7 October 1951. Article 9 provided for a law to be written to specify conditions for acquiring nationality after independence and Article 10 disallowed dual nationality. The Nationality Law No. 17 of 1954, provided that after 7 October 1951, children born anywhere to a father or grandfather who had been born in Libya were nationals of origin, and foreigners could naturalize after a consecutive ten-year residency. It granted nationality to any person born in the country, who did not have foreign nationality at birth. Under the provision foundlings or children whose parents were stateless could acquire Libyan nationality. It contained provisions for jus matrimoii, acquiring nationality through marriage, that allowed wives of Libyan husbands to naturalize by renouncing other nationality and husbands of Libyan wives to naturalize after a five-year residency. Children born to Libyan women married to foreigners were allowed to naturalize after a three-year residency.

In 1980, the Libyan Arabic Nationality Act (Law No. 18) was passed taking a Pan-Arabic approach to nationality. Under its terms, nationality of origin was expanded to include descent from mothers and grandmothers of Libyan origin. Children born outside of wedlock to non-Libyan or non-Arabic mothers could not derive Libyan nationality. Persons could be naturalized if they were of Arab origin other than Palestinian, were married to an Arab man who was not Palestinian, and were not older than fifty. Foreign women could obtain Libyan nationality after a residency and marriage duration of two years, if she renounced any other nationality. Arab men who married Libyan women could be naturalized after four years, children born to a Libyan mother and foreign father could obtain naturalization after three years, and persons of Arab descent could naturalize after a five-year residency. Nationality could be revoked for living abroad, serving or working for a foreign government, or seeking asylum from a foreign country. An amendment to the 1980 Nationality Act was passed in 1984, which provided that in some cases, the General People's Committee could waive the requirement for renunciation of prior nationality at naturalization.

In the 1970s, Libyan leader Muammar Gaddafi had invaded the Aouzou Strip, along the border of Libya and Chad and issued Libyan nationality documents to inhabitants of the area. Tebu people throughout Libya were issued papers from Aouzou administrative authorities. After years of conflict, in 1990, once peace was attained, the territorial dispute was turned over to the International Court of Justice for resolution. The court granted the territory to Chad in 1994, and Gaddafi's response was the issuance of a decree on 1996, denaturalizing persons whose papers indicated that they were from Aouzou, and placing their status under the laws regarding foreigners. This was followed in 2007, by a government directive declaring all Tebu people to be Chadian, rather than Libyan. In 2010, Law No. 24 was passed to update the Nationality Law. Under its terms, people who claimed Libyan nationality by descent were required to be registered on a special list to be reviewed by a committee with discretionary powers to grant or disallow Libyan nationality. The committee, was tasked with disallowing, rather than approving claims, which resulted in difficulties for Sub-Saharan tribal populations, such as the Berbers and Tauregs, to access nationality.

Under the terms of the 2010 Nationality Law, only foundlings could acquire nationality by birth in the territory. Nationality by descent from a father was automatic, but provisions for gaining nationality from a mother were unclear because they referenced later provisions to be enacted for the process. The law limited acquisition of nationality by jus matrimonii to wives of a Libyan national after two years of marriage, as long as he was not Palestinian. Naturalization could be acquired after a ten-year residency, for those who had sufficient income to sustain themselves, were of good character and health and were under 50 years of age. Provisions were also made for acquisition of nationality for those who had provided service to the Libyan nation. After the fall of Gaddafi in 2011, decreed a blanket nationality to some 5,600 Tuareg applicants for Libyan status. The transitional government began implementing the following year a new national identification program and cancelled over one million identity papers, including those of Tuareg and Tebu people, who it deemed to be Chadian.

In 2017, a new constitution was drafted, which was still pending adoption in 2021. Under its terms, dual nationality was favored and it also contained provisions to resolve the over 40,000 nationality applications from ethnic minorities and returnees from exile which have been pending since the 1980s. The draft constitution made few changes in the provisions for acquisition of nationality, save for Article 13, which specified that children could equally acquire nationality maternally. It proposed lengthening the residency period for naturalization to fifteen years and added a clause that while Libyan status could not be withdrawn from nationals of origin, naturalized persons could be denaturalized within ten years of gaining Libyan status. The Tebu Constitution Drafting Assembly rejected the draft constitution and only one Tuareg member of the Constitution Drafting Assembly approved the draft with the othe Tuareg members abstaining from voting. Events of the Libyan Civil War suspended the constitutional reform in 2019.
