= Department of Passport (Nepal) =

Government agency of Nepal

Department of Passport (DoP)

Agency overview
- Formed: 26 January 2012
- Preceding agency: Passport Section under the Protocol Division of the Ministry
- Jurisdiction: Nepal
- Headquarters: Tripureshwor, Kathmandu, Nepal
- Motto: "गुणस्तरीय, पारदर्शी एवं सेवाग्राहीमैत्री सेवा"
- Minister responsible: Shisir Khanal, Minister of Foreign Affairs
- Agency executive: Tirtha Raj Aryal, Director General
- Parent agency: Ministry of Foreign Affairs, Government of Nepal
- Website: https://nepalpassport.gov.np/

The Department of Passport is a government agency of Nepal assigned with the responsibilities of issuing Passports to the Nepalese citizens and Travel Documents to the legally applicable persons under Ministry of Foreign Affairs.

== History ==
Until 31 March 2010, Nepal still issued hand-written Passports. However, as a member of International Civil Aviation Organization, Nepal was obliged to issue machine-readable passports. The Central Passport Office stopped issuing hand-written passports on 31 March 2010 and had to be withdrawn from circulation as of November 2015. On 26 December 2010, the Office introduced machine-readable passports and issued them thereafter. As of 2021, Nepal began issuing E-passport to replace the Machine-readable passport.
