= Nepali nationality law =

Nepali Citizenship Act

Parliament of Nepal
- Long title: An Act relating to Nepali citizenship
- Enacted by: Government of Nepal
- Status: Current legislation

The Nationality law in Nepal are regulated primarily by 2015 Constitution of Nepal, Nepal Citizenship Act 2006 and Nepal Citizenship Regulations 2006. The Nepali Constitution regulates provisions for Nepali nationality in Part 2 from Article 10 to 15. The Nepal Citizenship Act 1964 was first promulgated on 28 February 1964 and provides for single citizenship for the entire country to inherit Nepali nationality. The Nepal Citizenship Act, 2006 was enacted on 26 November 2006. It repeals the 1964 Act and makes further provisions for the acquisition and termination of Nepali citizenship and related. Recently, after the 3rd amendment of the Citizenship Procedures, Non-Resident Nepali are also allowed to have citizenship with limited social, economic and cultural rights.

== Application ==
=== Citizenship by descent ===
Nepali citizenship is based on the principles of jus sanguinis or bloodline. Generally, a person born to parents who are citizens of Nepal will have a claim to citizenship of Nepal on the basis of descent and every minor found in Nepal whose parents' whereabouts are not known will have a claim to citizenship of Nepal on the basis of descent until the whereabouts of the parents is known.

Prior to the passage of the Nepal Citizenship Act, 2006 on 26 November 2006, Nepal citizenship was transmissible only through a Nepalese father. Since passage of the new Act, a Nepali mother can transmit her citizenship to a child unless the father is foreign citizen.

=== Citizenship by birth ===
Prior to 26 November 2006, there was no provision for the acquisition of Nepalese citizenship by virtue of birth in Nepal. Under the Nepal Citizenship Act, 2006, a person who was born in Nepal before mid-April 1990, has a permanent domicile, and has been continuously resident in Nepal throughout their life can apply to acquire citizenship of Nepal on the basis of birth. Such persons will have to submit either land ownership certificates or house ownership certificates or their registration number on voters' lists to obtain.

=== Citizenship by naturalization ===
Any foreign national of full age and capacity may submit an application to obtain Nepali citizenship if:

- They can speak and write in the national language of Nepal.
- They are engaged in any occupation in Nepal.
- They have relinquished their citizenship of another state.
- They have resided in Nepal for at least 15 years.
- They are a citizen of a country where there is the legal provision or a custom to provide naturalized citizenship to Nepali nationals: and
- They are of good conduct and character.

A person who is married to a Nepali citizen may submit an application to become a citizen of Nepal. They shall enclose along with such application evidence of their marriage to a Nepali national, and of having initiated action to relinquish their foreign citizenship.

Any person who is the son, daughter, or descendant of any Nepali national may apply to obtain Nepali citizenship if:

- They can speak and write in the national language of Nepal;
- They have relinquished the citizenship of another state;
- They have been residing in Nepal for the past two years with the intention of residing in Nepal permanently; and
- They are virtuous, of good conduct and character.

== Amendments and Recent Developments ==
=== 2022 Citizenship Amendment Bill ===
In July 2022, the Parliament of Nepal passed the Citizenship Amendment Bill, aimed at clarifying provisions for acquiring citizenship by descent and naturalization. One of the central changes was to allow Nepali mothers to pass citizenship to their children even when the father's identity is unknown or foreign. The bill, however, maintained restrictions in cases where the father is identified as a foreign national.

President Bidya Devi Bhandari refused to authenticate the bill, returning it to Parliament. After political deadlock, newly elected President Ram Chandra Paudel authenticated the bill in May 2023. The amendment came into force thereafter.

While supporters praised it as progress towards gender equality, critics argued the law continued to favor paternal lineage and discriminated against women. Legal analysts also questioned the constitutional procedure used in the bill's authentication.

== Nepal citizenship certificates ==
In Nepal, a Citizenship certificate (the legal paper denoting citizenship) is issued only to persons who have attained the age of sixteen. A person who is more than 16 years old and who wants to acquire a citizenship certificate on the basis of birth or descent is required to apply for the same by including with the application the Nepali citizenship certificate of one's parents or close relative in their lineage, the certificate attesting one's lineage, the recommendation of the Village Development Committee or Municipality concerned, the land-ownership certificate in one's name, their parents names, or the receipt of the house tax.

== Relinquishment and restoration of Nepali citizenship ==
Relinquishment is covered in Section 10 of the Nepal Citizenship Act, 2006. If any Nepali citizen notifies the prescribed authority, in the prescribed manner of their decision to relinquish Nepali citizenship, the prescribed authority may register such notice, and their Nepali citizenship shall cease to exist with effect from the date of such recording.

Section 11 of the Nepal Citizenship Act provides for any person who has relinquished the citizenship of Nepal and desires to again become a citizen of Nepal to reacquire Nepali citizenship. The person must submit an application, along with evidence of them having been a citizen of Nepal previously, and also of having relinquished any foreign citizenship they have held.

== Automatic termination of Nepali citizenship ==
There is a total prohibition on dual nationality in Nepal. To lawfully be issued a citizenship certificate, a person must have no other allegiances. If a Nepal citizenship certificate holder, at any time, possesses any other nationality or citizenship the Nepal citizenship certificate issued to them automatically becomes invalid or void. Nepalese authorities have confirmed, as recently as November 2006, that "there is a total prohibition on dual nationality in Nepal". Termination is covered in Section 10 of the Nepal Citizenship Act, 2006.

Section 10(1) of the act provides that the Nepalese citizenship of "any" Nepalese citizen shall automatically lapse on his acquiring the citizenship of any foreign country. Any citizen of Nepal who by naturalization, registration, or by any other act acquires a foreign nationality, immediately ceases to be a citizen of Nepal irrespective of whether they are an adult or minor.

Section 10(4) of the act provides that any Nepalese person who by birth is deemed a citizen of a foreign country and has a claim to citizenship of Nepal jus sanguinis (by blood) must choose a single nationality between sixteen and eighteen years of age. If they fail to do so, their claim to Nepalese citizenship shall automatically lapse on their eighteenth birthday.

== Persons of Nepalese origin born in Hong Kong ==
Recent clarification of Nepalese Citizenship law has meant a number of persons born in Hong Kong who failed to renounce their British nationality before the age of 21 and were previously thought to be citizens of Nepal are in fact solely British. The British Government has recently accepted that certain Nepalese passport holders born in Hong Kong before 30 June 1976 are British Overseas citizens, and can register for full British citizenship (with right of abode in the UK) if they wish to do so.

In July 2005, the British Home Office authorities accepted that "it is clear from Section 9(2) of the Nepalese Citizenship Act 1964 that anyone who is a dual Nepalese citizen by birth will automatically lose their Nepali citizenship when they reach the age of 21 if they have not renounced their other citizenship. Therefore it would be sufficient for our purposes for an applicant to provide evidence that they are over 21 and hold British status." The British Consulate-General Hong Kong website has been updated to reflect that Nepalese persons in this category are British Overseas citizens and can register as British citizens.

British authorities have also confirmed that anyone wishing to obtain a letter stating that they held British nationality on 4 February 1997 and 30 June 1997 can obtain one by applying to British Consulate in Hong Kong.

As a result of representations made by Lord Avebury regarding the rights to British nationality of persons of Nepalese origin born in Hong Kong before the handover, on 22 November 2006, a meeting took place between representatives of the Nepalese and British Governments to discuss aspects of Nepalese nationality law. Representatives from the Nepalese Ministries of Foreign and Home Affairs, the Nationality Directorate of the Home Office, the Consular Directorate of the Foreign & Commonwealth Office, and the Consular Section at the British Embassy in Nepal attended the meeting.

== Allegations of gender bias ==
The citizenship law has been criticized as being gender biased as Nepalese mother has to declare in case the father was unidentified, but no such declarations are required in case of a Nepalese father.

== Travel freedom ==
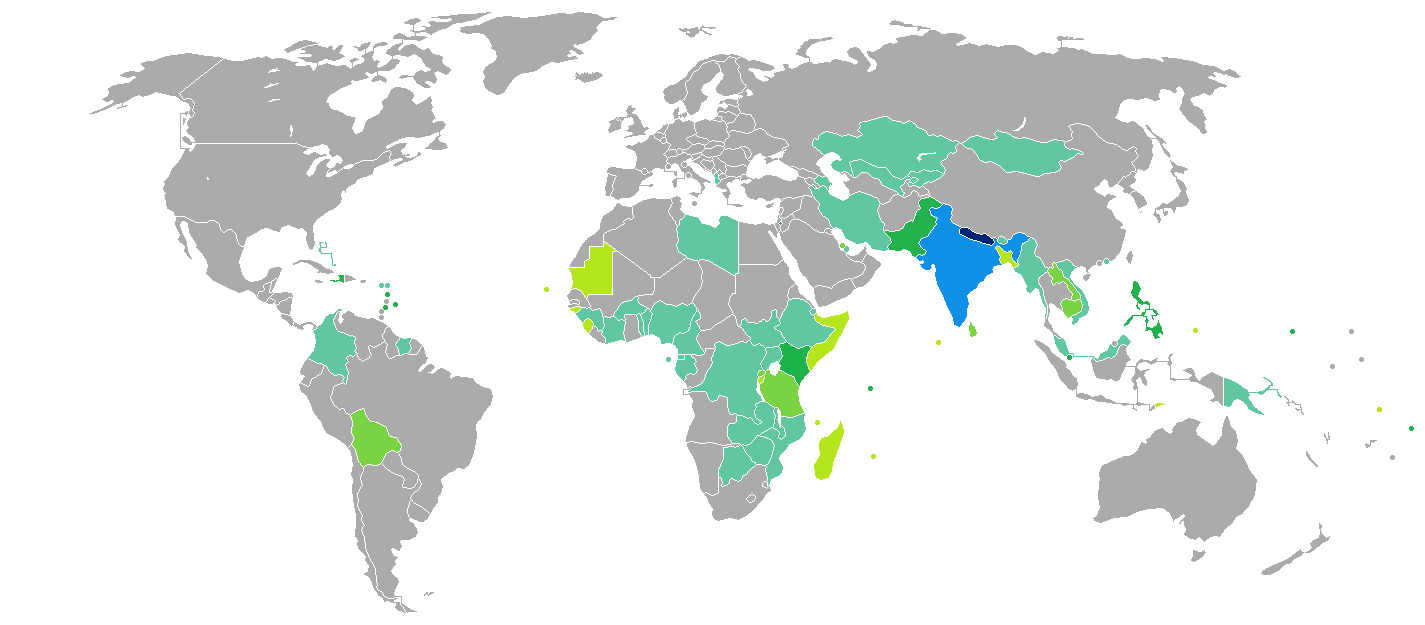
Visa requirements for Nepalese citizens.

In 2016, Nepalese citizens had visa-free or visa-on-arrival access to 37 countries and territories, ranking the Nepalese passport 98th in the world according to the Visa Restrictions Index.
