= Jus sanguinis =

Citizenship by parents' nationality

Countries with jus sanguinis jus sanguinis jus sanguinis and leges sanguinis leges sanguinis No data

Jus sanguinis (English: /dʒʌs ˈsæŋɡwɪnɪs/ juss SANG-gwin-iss or /juːs -/ yooss -, Latin: [juːs ˈsaŋɡwɪnɪs]), meaning 'right of blood', is a principle of nationality law by which nationality is determined or acquired by the nationality of one or both parents. Children at birth may be nationals of a particular state if either or both of their parents have nationality of that state. It may also apply to national identities of ethnic, cultural, or other origins. Citizenship can also apply to children whose parents belong to a diaspora and were not themselves citizens of the state conferring citizenship. This principle contrasts with jus soli ('right of soil'), which is solely based on the place of birth.

In the 21st century, almost all states apply some combination of jus soli and jus sanguinis in their nationality laws to varying degrees, in contrast to largely pure forms of either as used in the 19th and 20th centuries. Historically, the most common application of jus sanguinis is a right of a child to their father's nationality. The majority of countries have since extended this right on an equal basis to the mother. Some apply this right irrespective of the place of birth, while others may limit it to those born in the state. Some countries provide that a child acquires the nationality of the mother if the father is unknown or stateless, and some irrespective of the place of birth. Some such children may acquire the nationality automatically while others may need to apply for a parent's nationality.

Most countries with mixed systems extend jus soli citizenship on a limited basis only to children born in their sovereign territory who do not qualify for citizenship elsewhere to avoid statelessness—an obligation for states party to the Convention on the Reduction of Statelessness. When the sovereignty over a territory is transferred from one state to another, individuals may be given the right of option of nationality based on jus sanguinis, typically on the condition of emigration from the ceded territory, or other rules.

== Modern development ==
Originally, the term nation was synonymous with ethnicity. However, at the end of the 19th century, the French-German debate on nationality saw the French, such as Ernest Renan, oppose the German conception, exemplified by Johann Fichte, who believed in an 'objective nationality', based on blood, race, or language. Renan's republican conception (with perhaps the presence of a German-speaking population in Alsace-Lorraine) explain France's early adoption of jus soli.

=== Mixed standards ===
Many nations have a mixture of jus sanguinis and jus soli. For example, the United States grants citizenship based on jus soli to almost all people born within its borders, and also grants citizenship based on jus sanguinis to children born outside its borders to U.S. citizen parents subject to the parents meeting certain residency or physical presence criteria. The United Kingdom usually applies jus sanguinis, but also has a jus soli principle for children of foreign citizens living in the U.K. depending on the parents' nationality and legal residence status. About 60% of all countries worldwide have a limited jus soli principle that extends citizenship to children born within their borders who do not qualify for citizenship in any other country. Countries which ratified the Convention on the Reduction of Statelessness are obligated to enact laws as a solution for statelessness.

=== Complications due to imposed boundaries ===
Some modern European states which arose out of the dissolved Austro-Hungarian or Ottoman empires have huge numbers of ethnic populations outside of their new national boundaries, as do most of the former Soviet states. Such long-standing diasporas do not conform to codified 20th-century European rules of citizenship. In many cases, jus sanguinis rights are mandated by international treaty, with citizenship definition imposed by the national and international community. In other cases, minorities are subject to legal and extra-legal persecution and choose to immigrate to their ancestral home country. States offering jus sanguinis rights to ethnic citizens and their descendants include Italy, Greece, Turkey, Bulgaria, Lebanon, Armenia, Hungary and Romania.

== Jus sanguinis states ==
=== Africa ===
State	Law
Algeria	According to Article 6 of the Algerian nationality law, a person is born Algerian if the person has either an Algerian father or mother.
Egypt	According to the nationality law of the Arab Republic of Egypt and its latest amendments, children born to an Egyptian father or an Egyptian mother acquire citizenship at birth, regardless of their place of birth.
Libya	According to the Libyan nationality law, a person is born Libyan if the person has an Libyan father, but for a Libyan mother can only pass her nationality to her children under very limited and specific circumstances.
Morocco	Moroccan nationality law works according to Article 6, which says a child born of a Moroccan father or a Moroccan mother is a Moroccan by filiation.
Kenya	According to Article 14(1) of the Constitution of Kenya, 2010 a person becomes a citizen by birth if on the day of the person's birth either parent is a citizen of Kenya
Nigeria	Nigerian nationality law works in accordance to chapter 3, section 25 1C of the Nigerian Constitution, which states any person who has at least one Nigerian parent is eligible for citizenship.
Tunisia	According to the Tunisian nationality law, when one of the parents is Tunisian, a child is considered Tunisian regardless of the child's place of birth or whether the child has acquired the nationality of another country.
South Africa	According to Section 2 of the South African nationality law, a child born to at least one South African citizen is considered South African, no matter where the child was born.

=== North America ===
State	Law
Canada	Under Canadian nationality law, citizenship by descent is generally available to any person born to a Canadian citizen parent. Between 2009 and 2025, the "first-generation limit" restricted citizenship to only those born abroad within one generation of a native-born or naturalized citizen parent. On December 15, 2025, Bill C-3 (An Act to amend the Citizenship Act (2025)) came into effect, repealing the first-generation limit and establishing a new framework based on the date of birth: Born before December 15, 2025: Anyone previously excluded by the first-generation limit automatically became a Canadian citizen on this date. This restoration is retroactive to birth and does not require the parent to meet any residency or "substantial connection" requirements.; Born on or after December 15, 2025: For children born abroad beyond the first generation, a "substantial connection" test applies. A Canadian parent born abroad can only pass citizenship to their child if the parent was physically present in Canada for a cumulative total of at least 1,095 days (three years) prior to the child's birth or adoption.; This change was introduced following the 2023 Ontario Superior Court ruling in Bjorkquist et al. v. Attorney General of Canada, which found the previous limit unconstitutional for creating "lesser classes" of citizenship.
Dominican Republic	According to the Dominican constitution, a child born abroad to at least one Dominican parent is a citizen.
Haiti	According to Haitian nationality law, every child born to a Haitian father or mother, no matter where he or she was born, is Haitian by the Haitian Constitution. This has been a big issue in the current Dominican nationality law; because of this and other factors, undocumented migrants' children born in the DR of Haitian origin are considered non-Dominicans, and therefore Haitians.
Mexico	Article 30 of the Mexican Constitution states that persons born abroad to at least one Mexican parent are Mexicans by birth.
United States	U.S. nationality law states that a child born abroad is given United States citizenship at birth if at least one parent is a citizen or a national, subject to certain conditions.

=== South America ===
State	Law
Argentina	Argentine nationality law
Brazil	Article 12, paragraph I b and c of the Constitution of Brazil establishes that a child born outside of Brazil to at least one Brazilian parent is a Brazilian national pending registration at the consular office or subsequent registration if residing in Brazil. They are considered originary Brazilian nationals as they are attributed Brazilian nationality by birth.
Chile	Chilean nationality law
Colombia	Colombian nationality law
Suriname	Surinamese nationality law
Venezuela	Articles 32 to 42 of the Constitution of Venezuela.

=== Asia ===
State	Law
Cambodia	Under Article 4 of Cambodia's law on nationality any child who is born from a mother or father who has Khmer nationality obtains Khmer nationality by birth, regardless of the place they were born.
China	According to Article 5 of the Chinese nationality law, any person born abroad with a parent who is a Chinese national shall have Chinese nationality. But a person who has acquired a foreign nationality at birth and whose parents have acquired permanent residency abroad or foreign citizenship shall not have Chinese nationality.
India	Indian nationality law. A child born in India on or after 3 December 2004 is considered a citizen of India by birth if both the parents are citizens of India or one of the parents is a citizen of India and the other is not an illegal migrant at the time of his birth. A person born outside India is considered as a citizen of India if either of his parents was a citizen of India by birth at the time of his birth, the parents must declare that the minor does not hold a passport of another country and have the birth registered at an Indian consulate within one year of the date of birth or with the permission of the Central Government, after the expiry of this period.
Indonesia	The Indonesian nationality law states that persons born anywhere to one Indonesian parent are Indonesian by birth.
Iran	According to the Iranian nationality law the following people are considered to be Iranian nationals: 1. All people residing in Iran except those whose foreign nationality is established; the foreign nationality of such people is considered to be established if their documents of nationality have not been objected to by the Iranian Government.; 2. Those born in Iran or outside whose fathers are Iranian.; 3. Those born in Iran of unknown parentage.; 4. People born in Iran of foreign parents, one of whom was also born in Iran.; 5. People born in Iran of a father of foreign nationality who have resided at least one more year in Iran immediately after reaching the full age of 18; in other cases their naturalization as Iranian subjects will be subject to the stipulations for Iranian naturalization laid down by the law.; 6. Every woman of foreign nationality who marries an Iranian husband.; 7. Every foreign national who has obtained Iranian nationality.; The Iranian nationality law was amended in 2019 to allow children born outside Iran to Iranian mothers and non-Iranian fathers to obtain Iranian nationality.
Israel	Israeli nationality law confers citizenship by law, upon all children of Israeli citizens born in Israel, as well as the first generation of descendants of Israeli expatriates living abroad. All children born abroad must be registered within 30 days of birth. Israel refuses travel of children holding a foreign passport who were born abroad to an Israeli parent. This birthright citizenship rule is not the same as the Israeli Law of Return.
Japan	The Japanese nationality law states that any person born to married parents and at least one of their parents is Japanese is automatically granted Japanese nationality by birth, regardless of the place of birth.
Malaysia	Prior to 2025, Malaysia nationality law states that only overseas born children whose father is a Malaysian citizen may get automatic citizenship. Overseas born children who only have a Malaysian mother must register for citizenship via Article 15(2) of the Constitution. Children born out of wedlock are required to follow their mother's nationality. If the mother is not Malaysian, they will have to apply for citizenship via Article 15A. Stateless children who are born within Malaysia but not a citizen of any other country within one year are also granted automatic citizenship by operation of law. Foundlings and abandoned children are also granted automatic citizenship to protect them against becoming stateless. In 2024, the Constitution (Amendment) Bill 2024 was passed, which permits an overseas born child to automatically obtain Malaysian citizenship, as long as one parent is Malaysian, by operation of law. However, there is a new time limit of one year to register them with the National Registration Department or any overseas consulate or embassies. The cut off age for stateless children born within Malaysia to apply for citizenship has also been lowered from 21 to 18. There is also a requirement for those born overseas but obtaining automatic citizenship via a Malaysian parent must now take the oath of citizenship when they turn 18. The changes do not apply to those born before the amendment. However this Bill has yet to be in force.
Mongolia	According to the Mongolian nationality law under the Nationality Act of Mongolia a child receives Mongolian nationality if: 1. both parents are Mongolian nationals, regardless of where they were born.; 2. they are born in Mongolia to a Mongolian national and a foreign national.; 3. one parent is a Mongolian national and the other parent is a stateless person, regardless of where they were born.
Nepal	The Nepali nationality law is govern by the Nepal Citizenship Act 2063 (2006). It states that any person born at the time when his father or mother is a citizen of Nepal, shall be a citizen of Nepal by descent.
Pakistan	The Pakistani nationality law states that a child born outside of Pakistan to a Pakistani parent is a Pakistani citizen by descent.
Philippines	Philippine nationality law is based upon the principles of jus sanguinis and therefore descent from a parent who is a citizen or national of the Philippines is the primary method of acquiring Philippine citizenship. This is based from Sections 1 and 2, Article 4 of the 1987 Philippine Constitution.
Singapore	Singapore nationality law allows for children who were born overseas to be Singapore citizens by descent if either parent is a citizen otherwise than by descent. For an individual born abroad to a parent who is a citizen by descent, the parent must have lived in Singapore for two of the five years preceding the child's birth. Any child eligible for citizenship by descent must have their birth registered at a Singapore diplomatic mission within one year of their birth. Prior to 15 May 2004, citizenship was transferrable by descent only from fathers who were citizens by birth or registration, and not mothers.
South Korea	The South Korean nationality law states that persons receive South Korean nationality at birth if at least one of their parents is a South Korean national.
Sri Lanka	Under Sri Lankan nationality law, primarily governed by the Citizenship Act, No. 18 of 1948, as amended by the Citizenship (Amendment) Act, No. 16 of 2003, a person born in Sri Lanka to at least one Sri Lankan citizen parent acquires citizenship by descent. A child born outside Sri Lanka to a Sri Lankan citizen parent may also acquire citizenship by descent, provided the birth is registered within one year, or within a longer period permitted by the Minister, through a Sri Lankan consular officer or the responsible authority in Sri Lanka.
Thailand	The Thai nationality law states that any person who is a child of a mother or a father who possesses Thai nationality is a Thai national at birth, whether they are born within or outside the Kingdom of Thailand.
Taiwan	According to Article 2 of Taiwan's nationality Act, a person shall have Chinese (ROC) nationality under any of the conditions provided by following subparagraphs, the first subparagraph being: his/her father or mother was a Chinese citizen or national when he/she was born.
United Arab Emirates (UAE)	Emirati nationality law is covered by UAE federal law No. 17 of year 1972 which states a child born to a father who is an Emirati citizen is an Emirati national by descent. The law was later modified to include mothers too.
Vietnam	According to the Vietnamese nationality law, the status of nationality is conferred by descent through both parents. If one parent is a foreign citizen, unknown or stateless, a written statement by the Vietnamese parent must be submitted upon birth registration in order to obtain nationalization. While the state only recognizes one nationality, dual or multiple citizenships are permitted. Receiving new citizenship will not automatically revoked the person's Vietnamese citizenship.

=== Europe ===
State	Law
Armenia	The Armenian nationality law is mentioned by Article 47 of the Armenian constitution. It states that every child whose one parent is a citizen of the Republic of Armenia shall have the right to acquire citizenship of the Republic of Armenia.
Austria	Austrian nationality law
Azerbaijan	The Azerbaijani nationality law is mentioned by Article 52 of the Azerbaijani constitution. It states that a person whose one parent is a citizen of the Republic of Azerbaijan is a citizen of the Republic of Azerbaijan.
Belgium	Belgian nationality law
Czech Republic	Under Czech nationality law, children and some grandchildren of citizens automatically receive citizenship regardless of birth location
Denmark	Danish nationality law
Estonia	Article 8 of the Estonian Constitution states that every child with at least one parent who is an Estonian citizen shall have the right, by birth, to Estonian citizenship.
Finland	Finnish nationality law
France	French nationality law
Germany	German nationality law. Any person born to a German-citizen parent is a German citizen. However, this is not the case for children born abroad if any of their German parents were born abroad after 31 December 1999 and do not have their primary residence in Germany: the child is not automatically a German citizen by birth, but can acquire German citizenship as long as any of their German parents register their birth with the responsible German diplomatic mission within one year of the child's birth. This limitation does not apply if the child would otherwise be stateless or if one foreign-born German parent was born on or before 31 December 1999. Thus, the German citizenship of future generations born abroad can be preserved by having each child's birth registered with the German diplomatic mission within one year of birth. Furthermore, Article 116(1) of the German Basic Law confers, within the confines of the laws regulating the details, a right to citizenship upon any person who is admitted to Germany (in its borders of 1937) as "refugee or expellee of German ethnic origin or as the spouse or descendant of such a person." At one time, ethnic Germans living abroad in a country in the former Eastern Bloc (Aussiedler) could obtain citizenship through a virtually automatic procedure. Since 1990 the law has been steadily tightened to limit the number of immigrants each year. It now requires immigrants to prove language skills and cultural affiliation. Article 116(2) entitles persons (and their descendants) who were denaturalised by the Nazi government, to be renaturalised if they wish. Those among them who took their residence in Germany after 8 May 1945, are automatically to be considered German. Both paragraphs (1) and (2) result in a considerable number of Poles and Israelis, residing in Poland and Israel respectively, being concurrently German.
Hungary	A person acquires Hungarian citizenship at birth if at least one parent is a Hungarian citizen. The place of birth is irrelevant. Furthermore, Section 4(3) of the Act on Nationality permits ethnic Hungarians (defined as persons "at least one of whose relatives in ascendant line was a Hungarian citizen") to obtain citizenship on preferential terms after one year of residence. In addition, the "Status Law" of 2001 grants certain privileges to ethnic Hungarians living in territories that were once part of the Austro-Hungarian Empire. It permits them to obtain an identification card but does not confer the right to full Hungarian citizenship. According to the latest Citizenship Law adopted in 2010, anybody, possessing certain evidence (certificates, documents) of his or her Hungarian roots from around the World can apply for Hungarian citizenship. The interview is led in Hungarian either in Hungary or at one of the Consulates abroad.
Iceland	Icelandic nationality law
Republic of Ireland	Citizenship by descent is automatic where at least one parent was an Irish citizen born on the island of Ireland. Second and subsequent generation descendants require registration of each generation in the Foreign Births Register before the birth of the next; citizenship by descent can be continued indefinitely as long as registration is performed this way. See also Irish nationality law and twenty-seventh Amendment of the Constitution of Ireland.
Italy	Italian nationality law
Malta	Maltese nationality law grants citizenship to any person descended from "an ascendant who was born in Malta of a parent who was also born in Malta."
Netherlands	Dutch nationality law
Norway	Norwegian nationality law
Poland	Polish nationality law. The definition of Polish citizenship has been based for years on article 34 of the Polish Constitution; this article is based on a jus sanguinis right to citizenship. Moreover, any child born by Polish parent(s) is a de jure citizen of Poland. In 1967–1968 the Communist State issued to Jews emigrating from Poland to Israel, instead of passports, a so-called travel document which granted them the right to exit Poland but not of re-entering it, in effect taking away their Polish citizenship on the assumption that, in emigrating or traveling to Israel, they renounced it themselves. In a 2005 verdict, the Supreme Administrative Court of Poland ruled that this action was illegal based on the state of law at that time. Consequently, it is now assumed the Jews who emigrated after 1968 have remained Polish citizens and their citizenship will be certified on request.
Portugal	Portuguese nationality law grants nationality to children and grandchildren of Portuguese nationals who are born abroad pending registration or application at a consulate or registration authority offices. Jus sanguinis nationality to children follows a simple registration procedure, whilst nationality through the grandparental route requires the proof of an effective connection to the Portuguese community. This connection is proved by language proficiency in Portuguese and the lack of aggravated criminal convictions. Nationals from other Portuguese-speaking countries are presumed to have sufficient knowledge of Portuguese pending only for them the lack of criminal convictions for aggravated offences.
Romania	Romanian nationality law
Russia	Russian nationality law
Slovakia	Slovakia grants full Slovak citizenship to children of Slovak parents (one or both parents) irrespective of the place of birth. Persons with at least one Slovak grandparent and "Slovak cultural and language awareness" may apply for an expatriate identity card entitling them to live, work, study and own land in Slovakia. Expatriate status is not full citizenship and does not entitle the holder to vote, but a holder who moves his or her domicile to Slovakia may obtain citizenship under preferential terms.
Spain	Spanish nationality law states that any person born to a Spanish parent acquires Spanish nationality by origin, whether they are born within Spain or abroad.
Sweden	Swedish nationality law
Switzerland	Swiss nationality law is exceptionally restrictive: someone who was born in Switzerland and has spent their entire life there has no automatic right to Swiss citizenship if neither of their parents are Swiss citizens, even if their parents are permanent residents or have themselves spent their entire lives in Switzerland. In fact, the citizenship criteria are simpler for a foreigner with no previous ties to Switzerland who marries a Swiss citizen, than for people born and raised in Switzerland but with foreign parents. Due to Switzerland's high immigrant population, there are more than a million people who were born and have spent their entire lives in Switzerland but are not Swiss citizens due to their parents being immigrants. Some Swiss-born third-generation immigrants even have Swiss-born parents but are not Swiss citizens if neither of their parents have naturalised. To obtain Swiss citizenship, people in this position must undergo naturalisation proceedings, which have a high bar to satisfy the "integration" criterion. The unusual rules hit international headlines in 2017 when a woman born in Switzerland to Turkish parents, who is a native Swiss-German speaker and has spent her entire life in Switzerland, had her citizenship application denied by the local municipality on "integration" grounds as she could not name enough Swiss mountains, cheeses and retail brands, and was deemed not to have gone skiing often enough. The decision was overruled by the cantonal government several months later. In 2017, Swiss voters in a nationwide referendum agreed to relax the citizenship criteria for third-generation immigrants slightly: although they will still not be Swiss citizens at birth and will need to apply for citizenship, they will no longer have to take naturalisation tests or interviews if their parents and grandparents are long-time permanent residents.
Ukraine	Article 8 of the Law on Citizenship of Ukraine permits any person with at least one Ukrainian grandparent to become a citizen upon renunciation of the former nationality. The "Status of a Foreign Ukrainian" can also be granted to foreign citizens with Ukrainian ethnic or territorial origin to work, study, and immigrate to Ukraine under preferential terms.
United Kingdom	By birth abroad, which constitutes "by descent" if one of the parents is a British citizen otherwise than by descent (for example by birth, adoption, registration or naturalisation in the UK). British citizenship by descent is only transferable to one generation down from the parent who is a British citizen otherwise than by descent, if the child is born abroad.

== Leges sanguinis states ==
Many countries provide citizenship on preferential terms to individuals with ethnic ties to these countries (leges sanguinis).

State	Description
Afghanistan	Connection to the Afghan diaspora. There have been controversial proposals to people of Pashtun origin.
Armenia	Article 14 of the Constitution of Armenia (1995) provides that "individuals of Armenian origin shall acquire citizenship of the Republic of Armenia through a simplified procedure." This provision is consistent with the Declaration on Independence of Armenia, issued by the Supreme Soviet of the Republic of Armenia in 1989, which declared at article 4 that "Armenians living abroad are entitled to the citizenship of the Republic of Armenia."
Bulgaria	Article 25 of the 1991 constitution specifies that a "person of Bulgarian origin shall acquire Bulgarian citizenship through a facilitated procedure." Article 15 of the Law on Bulgarian Citizenship provides that an individual "of Bulgarian origin" (ethnicity) may be naturalized without any waiting period and without having to show a source of income, knowledge of the Bulgarian language, or renunciation of his former citizenship. This approach has been a tradition since the new constitutional foundation of Bulgaria in 1879, following the liberation from Ottoman yoke in 1878, when large numbers of ethnic Bulgarians remained outside of the state borders. Bulgaria and Greece were subject to a population exchange following the Second Balkan War. The conditions of the treaty settlement mandated that they accept individuals claiming respective ethnic origin.
Croatia	Article 11 of the Law on Croatian Citizenship allows emigrants and their descendants to acquire Croatian nationality upon return, without passing a language examination or renouncing former citizenship. In addition, Article 16 allows ethnic Croats living outside Croatia to "acquire Croatian citizenship" by making a written declaration and by submitting proof of attachment to Croatian culture.
Finland	Finnish law provides a right of return to ethnic Finns from the former Soviet Union, including Ingrians. Applicants must now pass an examination in one of the official languages of the country, Finnish or Swedish. Certain persons of Finnish descent who live outside the former Soviet Union also have the right to establish permanent residency, which would eventually entitle them to qualify for citizenship.
Germany	Article 116(1) of the German basic law confers, subject to laws regulating the details, a right to citizenship for anyone admitted to Germany within its 1937 borders as a "refugee or expelled of German ethnic origin or as the spouse or descendant of such a person." Until 1990, ethnic Germans from the Eastern bloc could obtain citizenship through a virtually automatic procedure, but since then the law was tightened, requiring applicants to prove German language skills and cultural affiliation.
Greece	Ethnic Greeks can obtain Greek citizenship by two methods under the Code of Greek Nationality. Article 5 allows ethnic Greeks who are stateless (which, in practice, includes those who voluntarily renounce their nationality) to obtain citizenship upon application to a Greek consular official. In addition, ethnic Greeks who join the armed forces acquire automatic citizenship by operation of Article 10, with the military oath taking the place of the citizenship oath. This position arises from the fact that approximately 85% of known ethnic Greeks were outside the boundaries when the country was formed, and 40% remained outside the final boundaries at the beginning of World War I. Most were de jure stripped of their host country citizenship with the outbreak of war if the host country was at war with Greece. In the late 19th century, Greece had a wider diaspora because of poverty and limited opportunities.
Ireland	While the child or a grandchild of an Irish citizen born in Ireland is entitled to Irish citizenship, section 16 of the Irish Nationality and Citizenship Act permits the Minister of Justice, at their discretion, to waive the residence requirements for a person "of Irish descent or associations."
Israel	The Law of Return offers citizenship to Jews wishing to immigrate, as well as non-Jews with at least one Jewish grandparent (see "Who is a Jew under the Law of Return?"), as well as their spouses. Exceptions can be made for those considered by the Minister of Interior to be a threat to the welfare or security of the state. While those with sufficient Jewish ancestry to qualify for the Law of Return who grew up with a religion other than Judaism and secular Jews are eligible to immigrate to Israel, Jews who voluntarily convert to another religion are not. Converts to Judaism who wish to immigrate to Israel are evaluated on a case-by-case basis by the Israeli Interior Ministry, which determines whether the conversion was sincere in its view. Israeli law also recognizes the descendants of Israeli emigrants living abroad as Israelis; this applies only to the first generation born abroad. Non-Jews can become naturalized after five years of residency and acquisition of a basic knowledge of Hebrew.
Italy	The nationality law of Italy bestows citizenship jus sanguinis. Prior to 23 March 2025, there was no limit of generations for the citizenship via blood. These rules stated that the first citizens of the modern Italian state were alive on 17 March 1861 when the state was officially formed, and for this reason all claims of Italian citizenship by jus sanguinis must stem from an ancestor who was living after 16 March 1861. Each descendant of the ancestor through whom citizenship is claimed jus sanguinis could pass Italian citizenship to the next generation only if this descendant was entitled to Italian citizenship at the time of the birth of the next person in the line. So if any person in the line lost the Italian citizenship and then had a child, that child did not inherit Italian citizenship jus sanguinis, except if the child could inherit the citizenship from the other parent. Cases of dual citizenship were possible, which is to say, for example, that a person in the line could have had Italian and Canadian citizenship concurrently. Minor children of Italian citizens were at risk of losing Italian citizenship if the child's parent naturalized in another country, unless the child was subject to an exception to this risk—and children born and residing in a country where they held dual citizenship by jus soli were subject to such an exception since 1 July 1912. Until 1 January 1948, Italian law did not generally permit women to pass on citizenship. Persons born before that date are in most cases not Italian citizens jus sanguinis if their line of descent from an Italian citizen depends on a female at some point before 1948. On several occasions, this limitation of deriving Italian citizenship only from fathers before 1948 has been successfully challenged in court. Unlimited jus sanguinis was ended on 23:59 (Rome Time), 28 March 2025 by Decree No. 36 (which was later converted into Law No. 74), which significantly changed the rules regarding acquisition of Italian citizenship. This limited claims of Italian citizenship to the following groups: Those who have a parent or grandparent who is an Italian citizen or who held exclusively Italian citizenship at the time of their death; or; those who have a parent or adoptive parent who resided in Italy for two consecutive years following their acquisition of Italian citizenship and before the date of birth or adoption of the applicant.; Those who had an appointment scheduled with the relevant consular, municipal, or judiciary authority prior to this date remain valid under the previous jus sanguinis regulations.
Kiribati	Articles 19 and 23 of the constitution provides, Every person of I-Kiribati descent […] shall […] become or have and continue to have thereafter the right to become a citizen of Kiribati […]. Every person of I-Kiribati descent who does not become a citizen of Kiribati on Independence Day […] shall, at any time thereafter, be entitled upon making application in such manner as may be prescribed to be registered as a citizen of Kiribati.
Liberia	The Liberian constitution allows only Negros (regardless of cultural or national affiliation) to become citizens, though people of other races may live in Liberia as permanent residents.
Lithuania	The Constitution of Lithuania grants a right to citizenship to foreigners of ethnic Lithuanian origins.
Myanmar	The Burma Citizenship Law of 1982 states: Nationals such as the Kachin, Kayah, Karen, Chin, Burman, Mon, Rakhine or Shan and ethnic groups as have settled in any of the territories included within the State as their permanent home from a period anterior to 1185 B.E., 1823 A.D. are Burma citizens.
Portugal	The Organic Law 2/2006, the Organic Law 9/2015 and the Organic Law 2/2018 state that Portugal has 'jus sanguinis' with a limit of two generations for citizenship via blood (with some restrictions). It allows for grandchildren of Portuguese citizens to acquire Portuguese citizenship even if their parent did not claim it. The Jewish Law of Return allows descendants of Portuguese Jews who were expelled in the Portuguese Inquisition to become citizens if they 'belong to a Sephardic community of Portuguese origin with ties to Portugal'.
Rwanda	The Rwandan constitution provides that "[a]ll persons originating from Rwanda and their descendants shall, upon their request, be entitled to Rwandan nationality."
Serbia	Article 23 of the 2004 citizenship law provides that the descendants of emigrants from Serbia, or ethnic Serbs residing abroad, may take up citizenship upon written declaration.
Spain	A Spanish law passed in 2015 allows individuals who can prove descent from the Sephardic Jews who were exiled in 1492 following the Alhambra Decree and who can show a "special link" to Spain to apply for dual citizenship. Spain had previously allowed application for such individuals but had required that they give up their citizenship from their other country. The new law has no such requirement.
South Korea	South Korean nationality law grants special status to ethnic Koreans and their descendants in the Korean diaspora. Under the Constitution of South Korea, North Korea is part of the Republic of Korea. Therefore, North Korean citizens are also recognized as South Korean nationals. All North Koreans of good conduct are granted citizenship upon arrival to South Korea.
Turkey	Turkish law allows people of Turkish origin and their spouse and children, to apply for naturalization without the five-year waiting period applicable to other immigrants. Turkey and Greece reciprocally expelled their minorities in the early 1920s after World War I. They were mandated by international treaty to accept incoming populations as citizens based on ethnic background.

== See also ==
- Birthright
- Blood quantum laws
- Diaspora politics
- Hereditary title
- Indigenous rights
- Jus soli
- Repatriation laws
- Right of return
