= Ministry of Foreign Affairs (Nepal) =

Government ministry of Nepal

- परराष्ट्र मन्त्रालय
- Emblem of Nepal

Ministry overview
- Formed: 1951
- Jurisdiction: Government of Nepal
- Headquarters: Singha Durbar, Kathmandu
- Minister responsible: Shishir Khanal, Foreign Minister
- Ministry executive: Amrit Bahadur Rai, Foreign Secretary
- Website: www.mofa.gov.np

The Ministry of Foreign Affairs (MoFA; Nepali: परराष्ट्र मन्त्रालय) is responsible for conducting external affairs of the Nepal. Ministry of Foreign Affairs represents other line ministries and the Government of Nepal while dealing with other states.

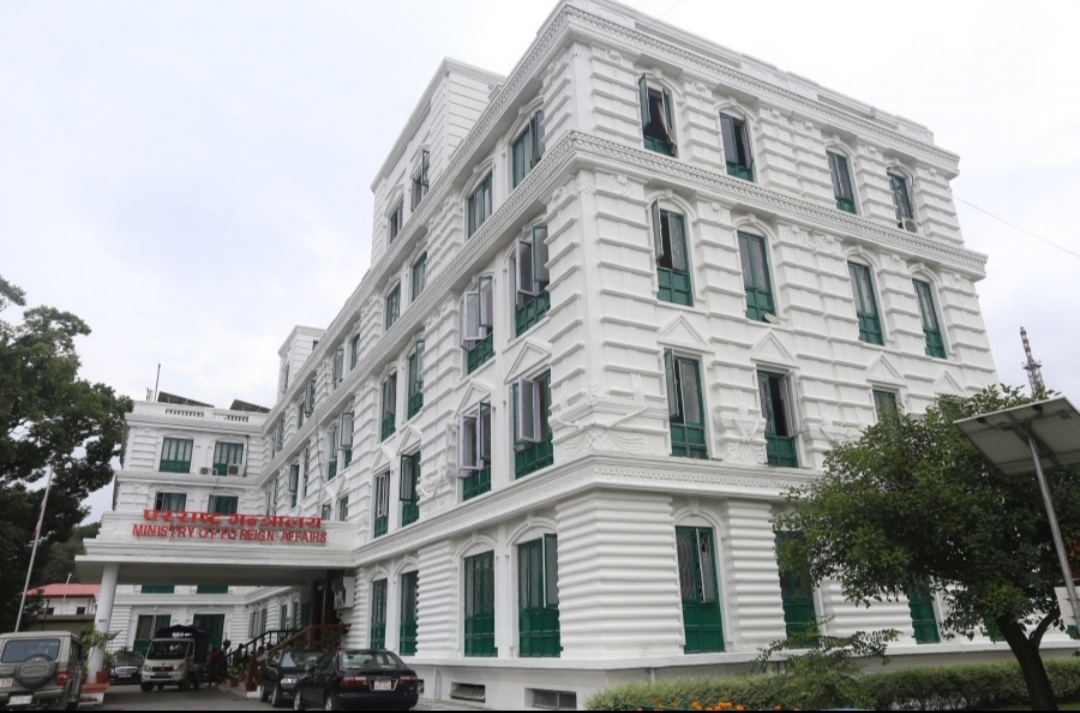
Building of Ministry of Foreign Affairs

== History ==
=== Jaishi Kotha ===
Following the unification of Nepal by King Prithvi Narayan Shah, an office known as the "Jaishi Kotha" was established to manage foreign affairs, particularly relations with Tibet and Qing China in 1769. The office was staffed mainly by officials from the Jaishi subgroup of the Khas Brahmin community, from which it derived its name. The Jaishi Kotha served as Nepal's first dedicated foreign affairs office in the country.

=== Munshi Khana ===
During the premiership of Nepal's de facto ruler, Bhimsen Thapa, the central foreign affairs office was renamed the "Munshi Khana", while the Jaishi Kotha continued to operate as a specialised division within it. The Munshi Khana remained the country's main foreign affairs institution throughout much of the Rana regime, undergoing several administrative changes. Under the premiership of Prime Minister Jung Bahadur Rana, the Munshi Khana was divided into three divisions:

- Jaishi Kotha
- Munshi Captain's Office
- British India Division

During the premiership of Prime Minister Chandra Shumsher Rana, the office was reorganised again into five divisions, supported by an associate office known as the Singha Durbar Farmaisi Adda:

- Jaishi Kotha
- Munshi Captain's Office
- India–Great Britain Division
- Sadar Amini Goswara
- Seema Survey

In 1934, the Munshi Khana was also referred to as Foreign Department in English correspondence. It was upgraded to the level of a department, and a Director-General was appointed to head it. Nepal conducted diplomatic correspondence and maintained its external representation through foreign offices in Tibet and British Raj. These included the Vakil Office in Lhasa, the Alaichi Kothi in Patna, the Honorary Vakil Office in Varanasi, and the Vakil Office in Calcutta, which was later relocated to New Delhi.

Throughout the Rana regime, Nepal maintained formal bilateral diplomatic relations with only four countries: France, the United Kingdom, the United States, and India, which succeeded British Raj in 1947.

=== Post-1951 expansion ===
Following the 1950–1951 revolution and the end of the Rana regime, an independent Ministry of Foreign Affairs was formally established. Nepal rapidly expanded international relations, joining the United Nations and the Non-Aligned Movement, and establishing diplomatic relations with more than 26 countries within a decade.

After 1960, the ministry's internal structure was divided into specialized departments based on their functions and geographical areas. These included:

- UN Division
- Europe–America Division
- North East and South East Asia Division
- Protocol Division
- Administration Division

Nepal actively participated in multilateral diplomacy and also became a founding member of the South Asian Association for Regional Cooperation (SAARC) in 1985, hosting its permanent secretariat in Kathmandu. By the end of this period, Nepal had diplomatic relations with roughly 100 countries, operating resident diplomatic missions in 15 countries, while hosting 19 foreign embassies in Kathmandu.

=== Post-1990 restructuring ===
Following the 1990 revolution, which ended the Panchayat system and restored multi-party democracy system, the ministry was reorganized in 1993 to improve its administration and operations. Separate Foreign Service Regulations established a dedicated Foreign Service Group, which was later recognized as the independent Nepal Foreign Service through the second amendment (2064 BS) to the Nepal Civil Service Act, 2049 BS. In the mid-1990s, the Institute of Foreign Affairs (IFA) was also established as a think tank and training body.

To support economic diplomacy and provide services to the growing Nepalese diaspora and Nepalese citizens, the ministry expanded its overseas network to 44 diplomatic missions, including 31 embassies, 3 permanent missions, and 10 consulates general, while the ministry as a whole is staffed by more than 400 personnel, including 278 career officers of the Nepal Foreign Service.

Alongside specialized agencies such as the Department of Passports and the Department of Consular Services, the ministry is responsible for developing foreign policy, managing bilateral and multilateral relations, handling diplomatic protocol, and protecting the interests and welfare of Nepali citizens abroad.

As of September 2026, Nepal maintains diplomatic relations with 188 countries.

== Roles, responsibility, and function ==
According to Government of Nepal (Allocation of Business) Rules, 2069 (2012) Ministry of Foreign Affairs has the following roles, responsibility, and function:

- Formulation, implementation, monitoring and evaluation of foreign policy, plan and programs of Nepal
- Relation with foreign nations
- Representation of Nepal in foreign countries
- Publicity of Nepal in foreign countries
- Passport and visa to be issued in abroad
- Hospitality Management
- Protocol
- Claim over a person of a Nepali or foreign citizen by the respective governments.
- Diplomatic protection (immunities) and privileges
- Record of Nepali citizens who are in abroad and their right, interest and protection.
- Non-resident Nepalese
- Economic diplomacy
- Development and promotion of public and non-governmental organizations at international level
- Consular practice
- United Nations, South Asian Association of Regional Cooperation and other international and regional organization
- Foreign diplomatic mission in Nepal
- Negotiation and agreement at diplomatic level (on the matters which do not fall under any other ministry)
- Operation of Nepal foreign service.

== The principle of Panchasheel ==
Panchasheel made up of Sanskrit word generally refers to the set of five rules or principles to be followed. It is the main principle of foreign affairs of Nepal. Its main goal is to create a peaceful diplomatic relationship between fellow countries and to build a stronger and warmer relations.

== Set of five rules ==
- Respect of the territorial integrity and sovereignty.
- No interference in the internal affairs of the countries.
- Not invading countries.
- Enhancement of mutual cooperation and benefits.
- Adherence to the policy of peaceful coexistence.

== Organisational structure ==
There are two departments under the Ministry of Foreign Affairs:

1. Department of Passports, Tripureshwor, Kathmandu (website)
2. Department of Consular Services, Tripureshwor, Kathmandu (website)

The Ministry has operated a Liaison Office in the border town of Birgunj since 2005.

The Ministry operates the Institute of Foreign Affairs in Tripureshwor, Kathmandu.

== See also ==
- Foreign relations of Nepal
- List of diplomatic missions of Nepal
- List of diplomatic missions in Nepal
