= National Identity Card (Nepal) =

Nepalese federal level identity card

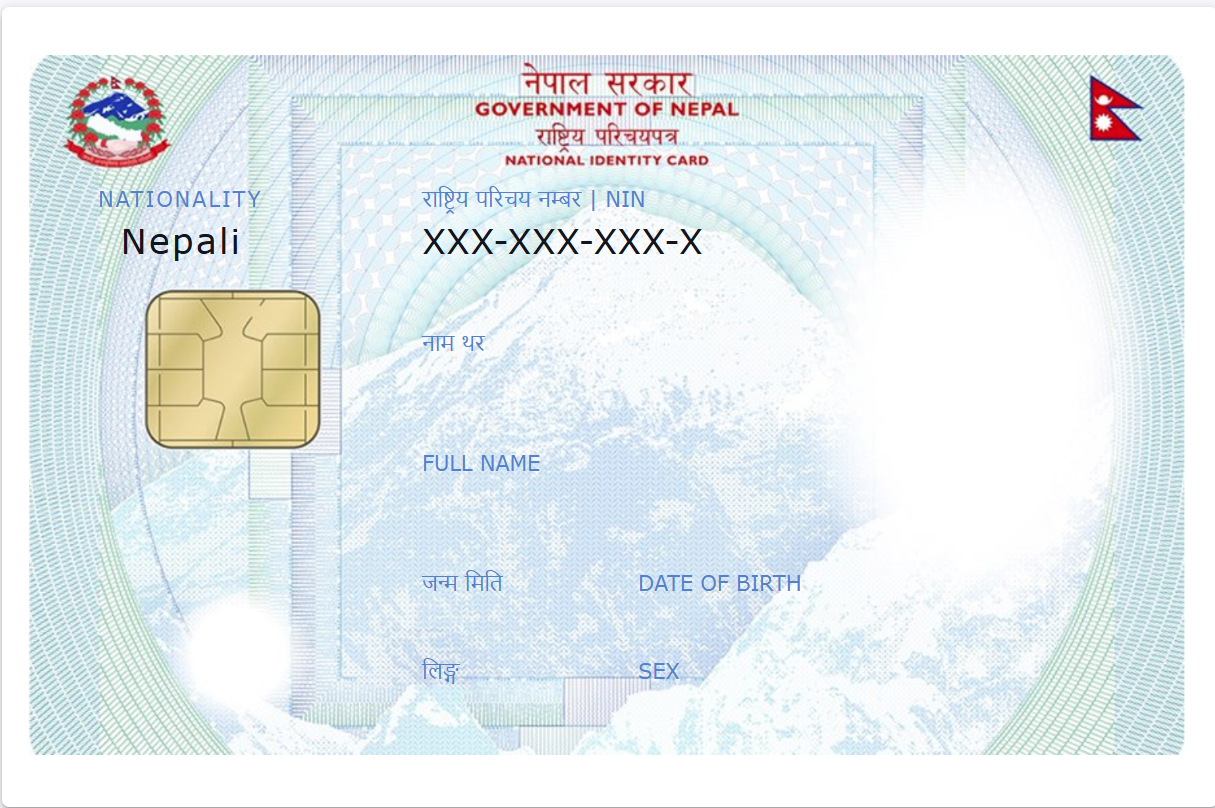
- Specimen of an Identity Card
- Type: Identity document
- Issued by: Department of National ID and Civil Registration, Ministry of Home Affairs
- Purpose: Identification; Direct Benefit Transfer; Insurance; Bank account
- Valid in: Nepal
- Eligibility: citizens of Nepal
- Expiration: Lifetime validity
- Cost: Registration: free

National Identity Card of Nepal is a federal level identity card with a unique identity number for each person that can be obtained by citizens of Nepal, based on their biometric and demographic data. The data is collected by the Department of National ID and Civil Registration (DONIDCR), under the jurisdiction of the Ministry of Home Affairs. The contract to process and deliver the cards was signed in 2018 with IDEMIA.

This card will feature a unique number, photo, personal Information and 10 fingerprints of the bearer. Upon full implementation, this card is to replace the current "Nepalese Citizenship" and it will be used for National Identity, personal identity, as Voter ID Card and as a Social Security Card through its unique number. This card will not replace other documents like Passport, Driver License.

The project began in the fiscal year 2018/19, with initial distributions in districts like Panchthar and to government employees. The Department of National ID and Civil Registration (DoNIDCR) now oversees the program, which is being implemented in phases, starting with 110,000 cards in Rupandehi District.

The National ID Card is expected to facilitate various official processes, including a centralized KYC (Know Your Client) system for banks and easier access to services like e-passports. While distribution is ongoing, many citizens are still awaiting their cards due to a slow processing timeline. Keep an eye on updates as the government works to expand distribution and improve efficiency.

== eNID Download and OTP Verification ==
The Department of National ID and Civil Registration (DONIDCR) has introduced an online service that allows eligible citizens to download an electronic National Identity Card (eNID) through its Citizen Portal. To access the service, users are required to provide citizenship-related details for identity verification. The eNID serves as a digital version of the National Identity Card and can be accessed through official government digital platforms.

As part of the authentication process, the system may require One-Time Password (OTP) verification linked to the user's registered mobile number before granting access to digital identity services. The introduction of eNID and OTP-based verification is intended to enhance security and facilitate online access to identity-related services.

== See also ==
- Nepalese passport
- Apply Rastriya Parichaya Patra Online in Nepal
