= List of diplomatic missions in Nepal =

This is a list of diplomatic missions in Nepal. At present, the capital of Kathmandu hosts 25 embassies. Many other countries have non-resident embassies either resident in New Delhi or elsewhere.

Honorary consulates and trade missions are excluded from this listing.

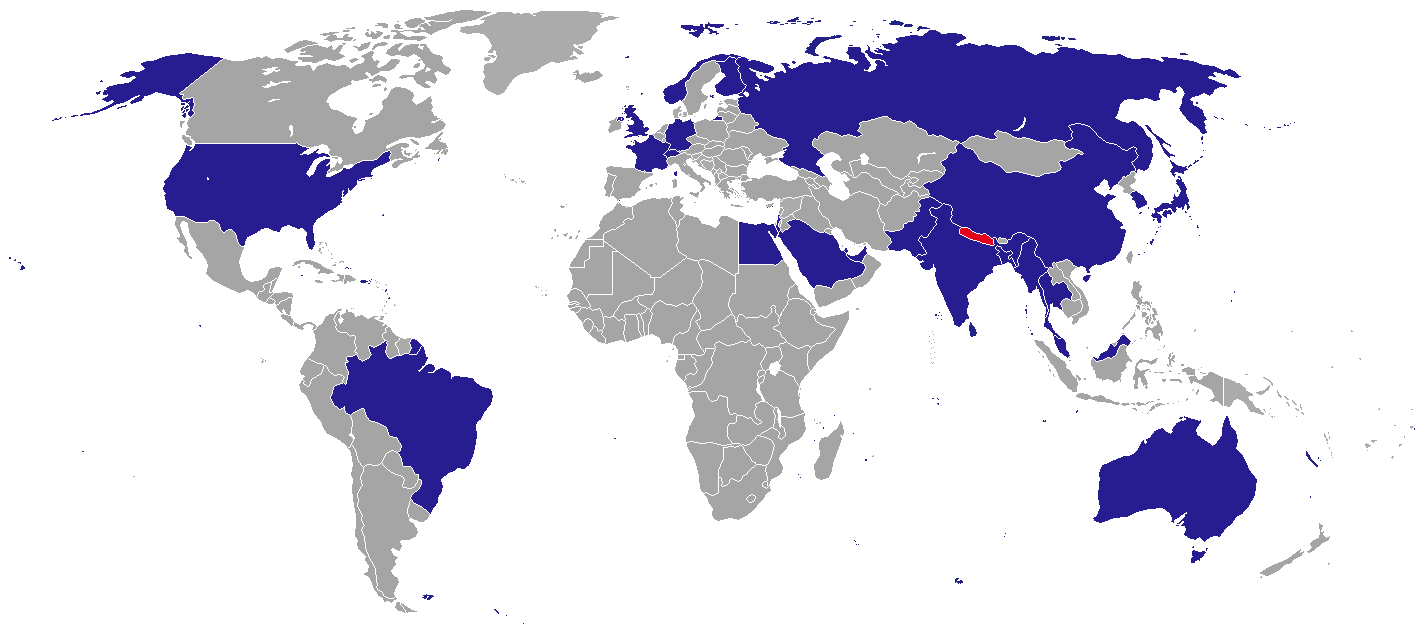
Map of diplomatic missions in Nepal

== Current missions in Nepal ==
Host city	Sending country (or organisation)	Mission level	Established	Ref.
Kathmandu	Australia	Embassy	April 27, 1984	
Kathmandu	Bangladesh	Embassy	October 3, 1971	
Kathmandu	Brazil	Embassy	September 30, 2011	
Kathmandu	China	Embassy	July 1960	
Kathmandu	European Union	Delegation	March 13, 2002	
Kathmandu	Finland	Embassy	1992	
Kathmandu	France	Embassy	June 1967	
Kathmandu	Germany	Embassy	1963	
Kathmandu	India	Embassy	December 1947	
Kathmandu	Israel	Embassy	March 1961	
Kathmandu	Japan	Embassy	February 1968	
Kathmandu	Pakistan	Embassy	1963	
Kathmandu	Russia	Embassy	October 4, 1959	
Kathmandu	South Korea	Embassy	May 15, 1974	
Kathmandu	Sri Lanka	Embassy	1993	
Kathmandu	Thailand	Embassy	1969	
Kathmandu	United Arab Emirates	Embassy	May 10, 2016	
Kathmandu	United Kingdom	Embassy	June 11, 1947	
Kathmandu	United States	Embassy	August 6, 1959	
Lalitpur (Note: While the majority of diplomatic missions are located within the capital city of Kathmandu, several embassies and international organizations are physically located in the adjacent city of Lalitpur. Both cities are part of the contiguous urban area of the Kathmandu Valley.)	Egypt	Embassy	1970	
Lalitpur	Malaysia	Embassy	December 2003	
Lalitpur	Myanmar	Embassy	1974	
Lalitpur	Norway	Embassy	January 2000	
Lalitpur	Qatar	Embassy	July 11, 2000	
Lalitpur	Saudi Arabia	Embassy	2012	
Lalitpur	Switzerland	Embassy	August 17, 2009	
Lalitpur	United Nations	Resident Coordinator's Office	January 1, 2019	
Birgunj	India	Consulate General	December 8, 2004	

== Non-resident embassies accredited to Nepal ==
=== Resident in New Delhi, India ===
1. Afghanistan
2. Algeria
3. Argentina
4. Armenia
5. Austria
6. Azerbaijan
7. Bahrain
8. Belarus
9. Belgium
10. Bhutan
11. Bosnia and Herzegovina
12. Botswana
13. Brunei
14. Bulgaria
15. Cambodia
16. Canada
17. Chile
18. Colombia
19. Costa Rica
20. Croatia
21. Cuba
22. Cyprus
23. Czech Republic
24. Denmark
25. Dominican Republic
26. Ecuador
27. El Salvador
28. Eritrea
29. Estonia
30. Ethiopia
31. Fiji
32. Gabon
33. Georgia
34. Greece
35. Guatemala
36. Guinea
37. Guyana
38. Holy See
39. Hungary
40. Iceland
41. Iran
42. Iraq
43. Ireland
44. Italy
45. Jamaica
46. Jordan
47. Kenya
48. Kuwait
49. Kyrgyzstan
50. Laos
51. Latvia
52. Lebanon
53. Lesotho
54. Libya
55. Lithuania
56. Luxembourg
57. Maldives
58. Mali
59. Malta
60. Mauritius
61. Mexico
62. Moldova
63. Mongolia
64. Morocco
65. Mozambique
66. Netherlands
67. New Zealand
68. Nigeria
69. North Korea
70. Oman
71. Panama
72. Paraguay
73. Peru
74. Philippines
75. Poland
76. Portugal
77. Romania
78. Serbia
79. Seychelles
80. Singapore
81. Slovakia
82. Slovenia
83. Somalia
84. South Africa
85. Spain
86. Sudan
87. Sweden
88. Syria
89. Tajikistan
90. Tanzania
91. Tunisia
92. Turkey
93. Turkmenistan
94. Uganda
95. Ukraine
96. Uzbekistan
97. Venezuela
98. Vietnam
99. Yemen
100. Zambia
101. Zimbabwe

=== Other Resident Locations ===
1. Bolivia (New York City)
2. Indonesia (Dhaka)

== Embassy to open ==
- Turkey

== Closed missions ==
Host city	Sending country	Mission level	Year closed	Ref.
Kathmandu	Denmark	Embassy (Note: Resident in New Delhi, India)	2017	
Kathmandu	Indonesia	Embassy (Note: Resident in Dhaka, Bangladesh)	1967	
Kathmandu	Italy	Embassy	1997	
Kathmandu	North Korea	Embassy	2023	
Kathmandu	Polish People's Republic	Embassy	1981	
