= Byans Rural Municipality =

Rural municipality in Sudurpashchim Province, Nepal

Byas व्याँस
- Rural municipality
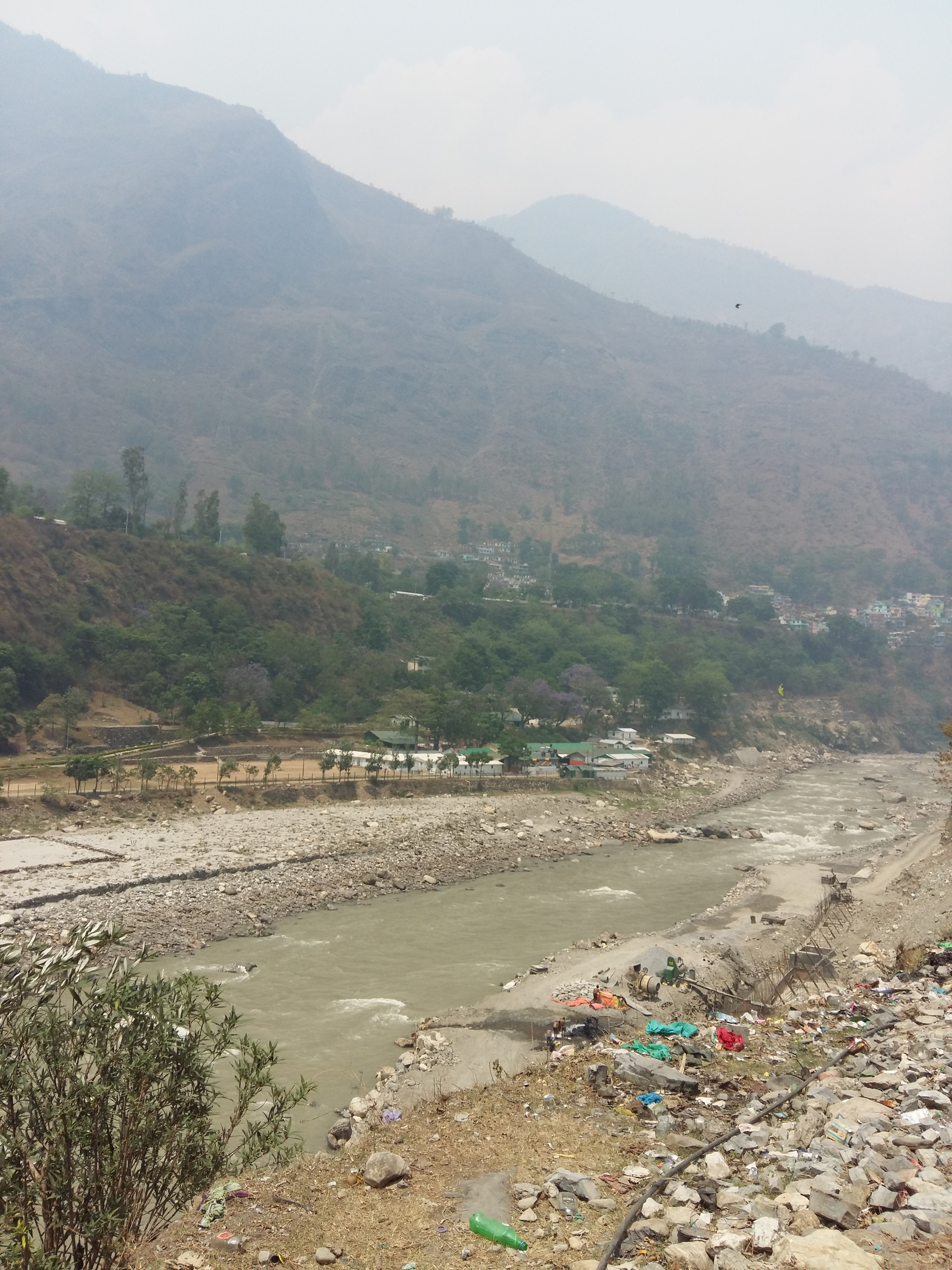
- A river in Byas rural council

- Location in province Byas (Nepal)
- Coordinates: 29.92°N 80.69°E
- Country: Nepal
- Province: Sudurpashchim Province
- District: Darchula
- No. of wards: 6
- Established: 10 March 2017

Government
  - Type: Rural council
  - Chairperson: Mr. Mangal Singh Dhami
  - Vice-chairperson: Mr. Binod Singh Kunwar

Area
  - Total: 839.26 km^{2} (324.04 sq mi)

Population (2011)
  - Total: 10,347
  - Density: 12.329/km^{2} (31.931/sq mi)
- Time zone: UTC+5:45 (NST)
- Headquarters: Sunsera
- Website: https://vyansmun.gov.np/

Byas (Nepali: व्याँस, romanized: Vyans, also spelt Vyas, Vyans and Byans) is a rural municipality located in Darchula District of Sudurpashchim Province of Nepal.

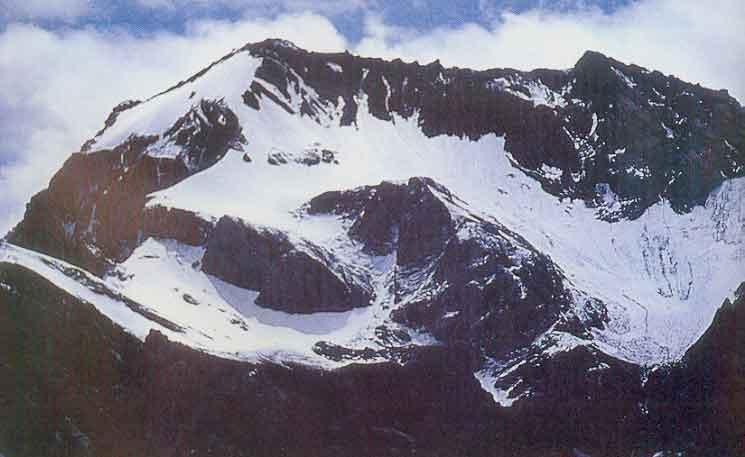
Om Parvat (Byas Rural Municipality, Darchula District) : It is considered sacred by Hindus and its snow deposition pattern resembles the sacred 'Om' (ॐ).

The total area of the rural municipality is 839.26 square kilometres (324.04 sq mi) and the total population of the rural municipality as of 2011 Nepal census is 10,347 individuals. The rural municipality is divided into total 6 wards.

== Etymology ==
The name Byas (Nepali: व्याँस) derives from Sanskrit Vyāsa, after the sage Vyasa. Lieutenant Henry Strachey, who visited the region in 1846, recorded that a mountain in the upper Kali valley was known as Byans Rikhi — properly the name not of the mountain but of the sage believed to dwell on its summit. He concluded that "Byans seems to be nothing else than the modern form of the old Sanskrit name Vyasa."

== History ==
The Byans region, from which the rural municipality takes its name, was historically a patti (sub-division) of parganah Darma in Kumaon. Before the Gorkha conquest of Kumaon in 1791, the area around Chhangru and Tinkar — the two principal villages in the northern part of the rural municipality — was considered an integral part of Kumaon, distinct from the kingdoms of Doti and Jumla. The southern portions of the rural municipality (Sunsera, Dhaulakot, Huti) were historically part of Doti.

After the Anglo-Nepalese War and the Treaty of Sugauli (1816), the Kali River was established as the boundary between British territory and Nepal. The Nepali governor Bam Shah claimed the villages east of the Kali, and the British conceded Changru and Tinkar on the grounds that the treaty entitled Nepal to territory east of the river. The parganah of Byans was thus divided between two countries, with seven villages remaining in British Kumaon and two transferred to Nepal.

Until 1962, the area was a thum (county) of Baitadi-Dadeldhura district. It became part of Darchula District in 1962 when four counties of the Baitadi sub-district were separately formed into a new district. The rural municipality in its current form was established on 10 March 2017 under Nepal's 2015 constitution, incorporating the former village development committees of Byans, Rapla, Sunsera, Dhaulakot and Huti.

== People ==
The northern part of the rural municipality (Ward 1, covering the Tinkar Valley) is inhabited by the Byansi people, who call themselves Rang and speak Byansi, a West Himalayish language. The principal Byansi villages are Chhangru (100 households) and Tinkar (80 households), with two newer villages, Rapla and Sitaula, established later to the south. The Byansi have historically maintained close ties with their counterparts across the border in Indian Byans, sharing a common system of five mukhiyas (headmen) whose authority and landholdings spanned both countries.

The 2021 census recorded the Byansi/Sauka as 5.90% of the rural municipality's population. The majority of the population are Chhetri (68.5%), Bahun (12.8%) and Bishwakarma (9.4%), concentrated in the southern wards (Sunsera, Dhaulakot, Huti) which were historically part of Doti rather than Byans.

Ward 1 (Byans), which covers the Tinkar Valley and the high-altitude Byansi settlements, had a population of only 237 in 2021, down from 556 in 2011, reflecting the continued decline of permanent settlement in the high valleys. The ward covers 565.32 square kilometres (218.27 sq mi) — over two-thirds of the rural municipality's total area — making it one of the most sparsely populated administrative units in Nepal.

== Ward Division ==
Byans RM is divided into 6 wards as below:

Byas RM
Village	Ward No.	Area (KM^{2})	Pop. (2011)	Pop. (2021)
Byans	1	565.32	556	237
Rapla	2	179.31	1187	1023
Sina	3	64.06	1349	1464
Sunsera	4	13.72	2755	2631
Dhaulakot	5	10.52	1906	1937
Huti	6	6.32	2594	2376
Byas	6	839.25	10347	9668

Ward No.3 (Sina) was created taking some area from previous village development committees Sunsera and Dhaulakot

== Demography ==
The total population of Byans rural municipality in 2021 has been decreased compared to 2011. According to the Nepal census 2021, there are 9668 people living here in 2143 households. The numbers of male comprises 4,578 while female are 50,90

Ethnically Chettri is a largest group in this rural municipality following Bahun second largest and Bishwakarma third largest.

Religiously Hindu is the largest group with 99.3% and Buddhist is the second largest group with 0.5%.

Ethnic groups according to (2021)
1. Chhetri (68.5%)
2. Bahun (12.8%)
3. Bishwakarma (9.40%)
4. Byansi/Sauka (5.90%)
5. Thakuri (1.90%)
6. Mijar (0.90%)
7. Pariyar (0.40%)
8. Others (0.20%)

Religious group
	percentage
Hindu	99.3%
Buddhist	0.5%
Other	0.2%

73.4% people of the all population are literate which means they can read and write but only 4.7% people have passed SLC.

Education
	percentage
Basic	5%
primary	30%
secondary	41.7%
SEE	4.7%
10+2	10.7%
Graduate & above	3.5%

== See also ==
- Apihimal
- Duhun
- Naugad
- Api Nampa Conservation Area
- Byans
- Tinkar Valley
- Byansi people
- Kalapani territory
- Kuthi Valley
