= Bhotiyas of Uttarakhand =

Ethnic group in India

Bhot Pradesh of Garhwal
Bhot Pradesh of Kumaon

Bhotiyas are group of people who live along the Indo-Tibetan border in the upper reaches of the Great Himalayas, at elevations ranging from 6,500 feet (2,000 m) to 13,000 feet (4,000 m). While they identify themselves with different names in different regions they were overall categorised with the common nomenclature used by Britishers based on geography. In Uttarakhand, they inhabit seven river valleys, three in the Garhwal division (Jadh, Mana and Niti) and four in the Kumaon division (Johar, Darma, Byans and Chaudans). They mainly follow Hinduism with Buddhism and traditionally speak West Himalayish languages related to the old Zhangzhung language(who said that?). Their main traditional occupation used to be Indo-Tibetan trade, with limited amounts of agriculture and pastoralism. The Indo-Tibetan trade came to a halt following the 1962 Sino-Indian war, and resumed only in the early 1990s under state-regulated mechanisms. Their major livelihood at present is the collection of medicinal and aromatic plants in the Himalayas. Many have also migrated out of their traditional habitats to towns at lower elevations. The traditional transhumance and pastoralism have also drastically reduced.

== Etymology ==
The name, Bhotiya (also spelt "Bhotia"), derives from the word Bod (བོད་), which is the Classical Tibetan name for Tibet. It was the term used by the British to refer to the borderland people, due to a presumed resemblance to the Tibetans. The Government of India continues to use the term.

== Garhwal Bhotiyas ==
The Bhotiyas of Garhwal are scattered over three main river valleys in the border districts of Chamoli and Uttarkashi. The three major Bhotiya groups in Garhwal are the Marchha (Niti and Mana Valley), Tolchha (Niti Valley) and Jadh.

=== Jadh ===
The Jad people are Bhotiyas who lived in Nelang and Jadung valley, some were relocated to the Bhagirathi valley area after the 1960s Indo-China political conflict. The religion practiced by Jad people is Tibetan Buddhism.

=== Marchha/Tolchah ===
The Marchhas and Tolchhas are the major bhotiya subgroup who live along the indo tibetan border of chamoli. The religion practiced by them is Hinduism their Ishta Devta is Badrinath, Pandavas and Kedarnath.

== Kumaon Bhotiyas ==
The Bhotiyas of Kumaon can be found in four river valleys in the Pithoragarh District - Johar Valley (Joharis), Darma Valley (Darmiyas), Chaudans (Chaudansis), Byans (Byansis).

The Bhotiya communities of Kumaon were historically administered under parganah Darma and parganah Johar. Parganah Darma was divided into three pattis (sub-divisions): Darma, Chaudans, and Byans.

The 1911 Almora Gazetteer recorded the following Bhotiya languages and speaker numbers in Kumaon: Rangkas (614 speakers, in Johar and four villages of Malla Danpur, the language is currently extict, with the speakers having migrated to the Johari dialect of the Kumaoni language), Byansi (1,585 speakers, in patti Byans), Chaudansi (1,485 speakers, in patti Chaudans), Darmiya (1,761 speakers, in patti Darma), and Bhotia or Hunia (820 speakers, scattered).

=== Cross-border connections ===
The Treaty of Sugauli (1816) divided the Byans region between British India and Nepal, with the villages of Chhangru and Tinkar being transferred to Nepal. Before the Gorkha conquest of Kumaon in 1791, the entire Byans region had been part of Kumaon, distinct from the kingdoms of Doti and Jumla.

Despite the political division, the Byansi maintained close ties across the border. They traditionally operated under a system of five mukhiyas (headmen), one from each of five Byansi villages in both India and Nepal. All Byansi land, whether in Nepal or India, was registered in the names of these mukhiyas, and land revenue was paid to the government in Tibet until approximately 1955. Ethnographic field work in the 1990s documented how Rang individuals maintained citizenship, houses, and family obligations on both sides of the border simultaneously.

The villages of Indian Byans have produced a notable number of senior civil servants, including officers of the Indian Administrative Service and Indian Police Service.

== Social status ==
As of 2001, the Uttarakhandi Bhotiyas were classified as a Scheduled Tribe under the Indian government's reservation program of positive discrimination.

== Population ==
As per the 2011 Census, there were a total of 39,106 Bhotia in Uttarakhand with ST status. Of them, 31,916 were Hindus and 7,190 were Buddhists. The most popular languages among the Bhotia are Kumauni (13,150 speakers), Garhwali (5,765), Hindi (5,809), Bhotia (7,592), Halam (5,300) and Rongpa (481).

There were a total of 510 births in 2010, corresponding to a birth rate of 13.04 per 1,000.

== See also ==
- Jad people
- Rung community
- Byans
- Chaudans
- Darma Valley
- Johar Valley
- Kuthi Valley
- Byansi people
- Kalapani territory
