= Byans, Darchula =

Rural area in Nepal's Darchula District

Byans ब्याँस
- Rural area/village
- Location in province Byans (Nepal)
- Coordinates: 30.10°N 80.97°E
- Country: Nepal
- Province: Sudurpashchim Province
- District: Darchula District
- Rural Municipality: Byans Rural Municipality
- Ward No.: 1
- Established: March 10, 2017; 9 years ago

Government
  - Type: Ward division
  - Ward chairperson: Ashok Singh Bohara
  - Party: CPN (UML)

Area
  - Total: 565.32 km^{2} (218.27 sq mi)

Population (2011)
  - Total: 556
  - Density: 0.984/km^{2} (2.55/sq mi)
- Time zone: UTC+5:45 (Nepal Time)
- Website: vyansmun.gov.np

Byans (Nepali: ब्याँस, byāṃs) is Ward No. 1 of the Byans Rural Municipality in Darchula District, Sudurpashchim Province, Nepal. It covers 565.32 square kilometres (218.27 sq mi), making it the largest ward in the municipality by area. At the time of the 1991 Nepal census, the population was 723; by the 2011 Nepal census, it had dropped to 556, and by the 2021 Nepal census to 237, reflecting the continued decline of permanent settlement in the high-altitude valleys.

The ward encompasses the Tinkar Valley, the Nepali portion of the historical Byans region, and contains the Byansi villages of Chhangru and Tinkar.

In March 2017, the Government of Nepal began restructuring local administrative bodies. A total of 753 new local-level units were created. Byans had previously been home to one of the district's village development committees (VDC) but this was merged with surrounding VDCs to form the Byans Rural Municipality. The Byas VDC is now Ward No. 1 within the municipality.

== History ==
Before the Gorkha conquest of Kumaon in 1791, the area around Changru and Tinkar was considered an integral part of Kumaon, distinct from the kingdoms of Doti and Jumla. After the Anglo-Nepalese War and the Treaty of Sugauli (1816), the Kali River was established as the boundary between British territory and Nepal. The Nepali governor Bam Shah claimed the villages east of the Kali, and the British conceded Changru and Tinkar on the grounds that the treaty entitled Nepal to territory east of the river. The parganah of Byans was thus divided between two countries.

When the zamindars of Byans were informed of the transfer, they petitioned Commissioner G. W. Traill in March 1817, stating that the remaining six villages on the British side — Budhi, Garbyang, Nabi, Rongkong, Gunji and Kuti — were entirely dependent on the agricultural production of Changru and Tinkar.

Lieutenant Henry Strachey, who visited in 1846, described Chhangru as situated on an elevated terrace at the foot of the mountain Kelirong, at approximately 10,500 feet (3,200 m), within the angle of the Tinkar–Kali confluence. He noted the village was on unsafe ground, gradually descending by landslip into the bed of the Tinkar river. Strachey argued that the true frontier should have been the snowy range of Tinkar, Nampa and Api to the east, beyond which lay the district of Marma in Doti, whose inhabitants were Khasia and not Bhotia.

In March 2017, the Government of Nepal restructured local administrative bodies. The former Byans village development committee was merged with surrounding VDCs to form the Byans Rural Municipality, with the Byans VDC becoming Ward No. 1.

== Geography ==
The ward encompasses the Tinkar Valley, drained by the Tinkar Khola (Tinkar River), which flows into the Kali River near Chhangru. The Tinkar Pass (5,258 metres (17,251 ft)) at the head of the valley provides a route to Taklakot (Burang) in Tibet and marks the starting point of the China–Nepal border, as defined by Article 1 of the 1961 Nepal-China Boundary Treaty.

The ward is bounded to the west by the Kali River (the India–Nepal border), to the north by the Great Himalayan range (the Nepal–China border), and to the east by the snowy range of Tinkar, Nampa and Api, beyond which lies the Marma region of Doti.

== People ==
The inhabitants are Byansi people, who call themselves Rang and speak Byansi, a West Himalayish language. Chhangru had approximately 100 households and Tinkar 80 households as of the 1970s.

The Byansi practise transhumance, spending summers in the high villages and wintering at lower elevations, primarily in Khalanga (Dharchula). They historically maintained close ties with the Byansi communities across the border in Indian Byans, sharing a common system of five mukhiyas (headmen) whose authority and landholdings spanned both countries. All Byansi land, whether in Nepal or India, was registered in the names of these mukhiyas, and land revenue was paid to the government in Tibet until approximately 1955.

Ethnographic field work by Katsuo Nawa in 1993–95 documented how citizenship, natal village and residence did not necessarily coincide for Rang individuals, with some maintaining houses and obligations on both sides of the border simultaneously.

== See also ==
- Byans
- Tinkar Valley
- Byansi people
- Chhangru
- Kalapani territory
- Kuthi Valley
