= Vyasa (disambiguation) =

Vyasa is a sage with a prominent role in most Hindu traditions, traditionally regarded as the author of the epic Mahābhārata.

Vyas, Vyasa or Byas, Byans / Vyans (Sanskrit: व्यास) may also refer to:

== Places ==
- Vyāsa (crater), on Mercury
- Beas River, an Indus tributary in India
- Vyas Municipality, a municipality in Tanahun district, Nepal
- Byans valley, a historical and ethnographic region in the Western Himalayas divided between India and Nepal.
  - Byans Rural Municipality, a rural municipality in Darchula district, Nepal
    - Byans, Darchula, a former village development committee, now merged into Byans municipality
  - Byansis, an ethnic group of the Byans region
  - Byangsi language, a Tibeto-Burman language spoken by Byansis

== Social groups ==
- Vyas Brahmins
- Vyas Samman
