= Chaudangsi language =

Sino-Tibetan language spoken in Uttarakhand, India

Chaudangsi
- Native to: India
- Region: Uttarakhand
- Native speakers: (1,800 cited 2000)
- Language family: Sino-Tibetan: Tibeto-Kanauri ?; West Himalayish; Almora; Chaudangsi

Language codes
- ISO 639-3: cdn
- Glottolog: chau1259
- ELP: Chaudangsi

Chaudangsi is a West Himalayish language of the Sino-Tibetan family, spoken in the Chaudans region of Pithoragarh district, Uttarakhand, India. It is closely related to Byangsi and Darmiya, and the three languages are mutually intelligible. Speakers of all three languages collectively refer to their speech as "Ranglo" and to themselves as Rang.

== Geographic distribution ==
Chaudangsi is spoken in the Chaudans patti (sub-division) of the old parganah Darma, a region of approximately 100 square miles situated between the Kali and Dhauli rivers from their confluence northwards, in Dharchula tehsil of Pithoragarh district. Chaudans lies between the Darma Valley to the west and the Byans region to the north-east, bounded by the Nirpaniya Dhura ridge.

Villages where Chaudansi is spoken include Panggu, Rongto, Rimzim, Waiku, Monggong, Chilla, Song, Sosa, Sirdang, Sirkha, Rung, Zipti, Gala, Tangkul, and Syang Khola. The 1911 Almora Gazetteer recorded 1,485 speakers of Chaudansi in the patti.

== Classification ==
Chaudangsi is part of a group of four small West Himalayish languages spoken in the former "state of Almora" in Kumaon, now divided between India's Uttarakhand and far-western Nepal: Rangkas, Darmiya, Chaudangsi, and Byangsi. The Linguistic Survey of India classified these languages as belonging to the eastern subgroup of the complex pronominalized Himalayan languages of the Tibeto-Burman family.

== See also ==
- Chaudans
- Byangsi language
- Darmiya language
- Byansi people
- Bhotiyas of Uttarakhand
