= Lipulekh Pass =

High mountain pass connecting India with Tibet, China

Lipu-Lekh Pass
- Location within Uttarakhand Location within Ngari Location within Sudurpashchim Province
- Elevation: 16,780 ft (5,110 m)

Location
- Location: Border between Uttarakhand, India and Tibet, China
- Range: Himalayas
- Coordinates: 30°13′58″N 81°01′43″E

Lipulekh Pass
- Simplified Chinese: 里普列克山口
- Traditional Chinese: 里普列克山口
Transcriptions
Standard Mandarin
- Hanyu Pinyin: Lǐ pǔ liè kè shānkǒu

The vicinity of the Lipulekh Pass

The Lipulekh Pass or Qiang La (Chinese: 强拉山口; pinyin: qiáng lā shānkǒu) is a Himalayan pass on the border between Uttarakhand, India and the Tibet region of China, near their trijunction with Nepal. Nepal has had ongoing claims to the southern side of the pass, called Kalapani territory, which has been under Indian administration from the British colonial period. The pass is near the trading town of Taklakot (Purang) in Tibet and has been used since ancient times by traders, mendicants and pilgrims transiting between India and Tibet. It is also used by pilgrims to Adi Kailash, Kailas and Manasarovar.

== History ==
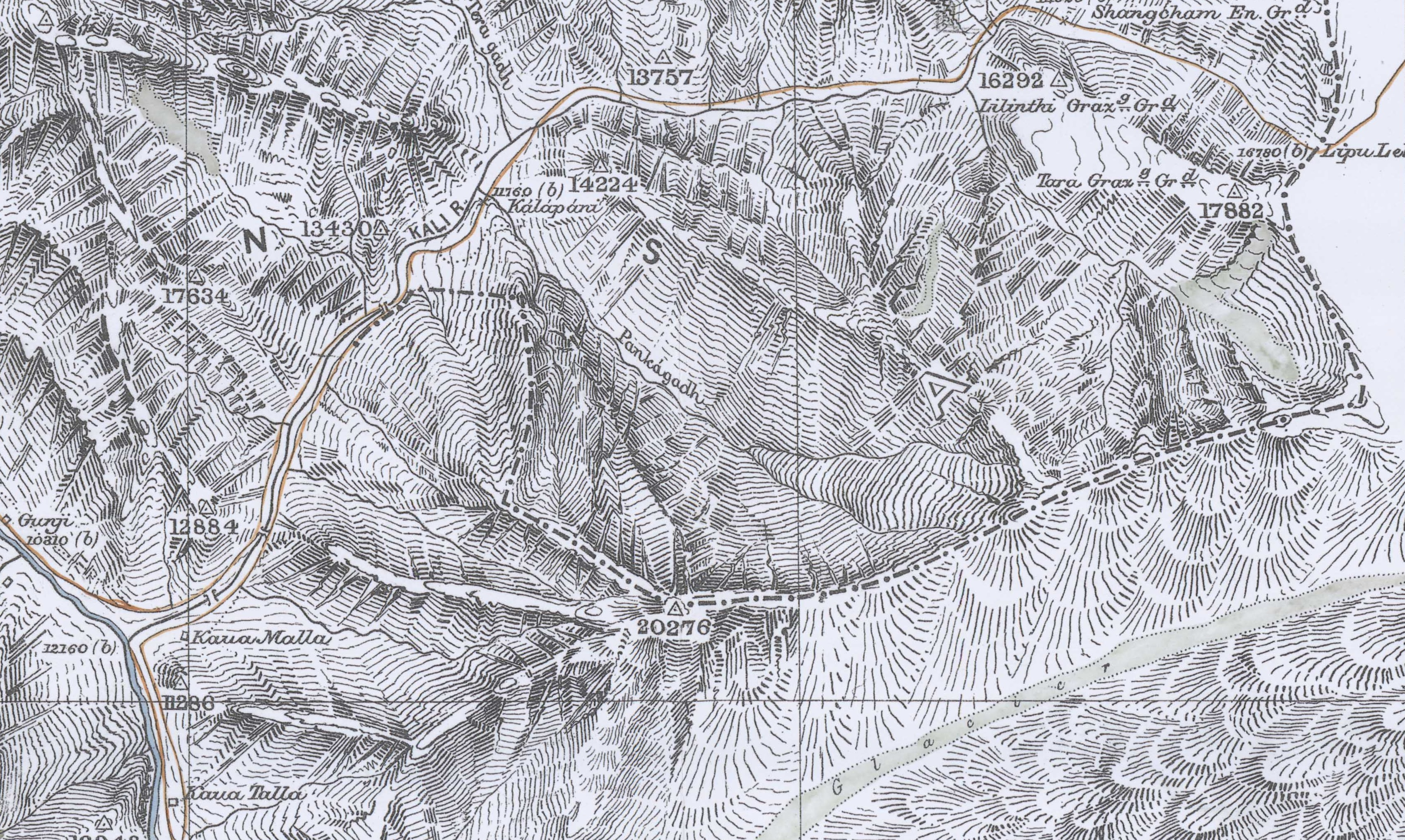
An 1879 Survey of India map showing the Kalapani territory as part of Kumaon, India

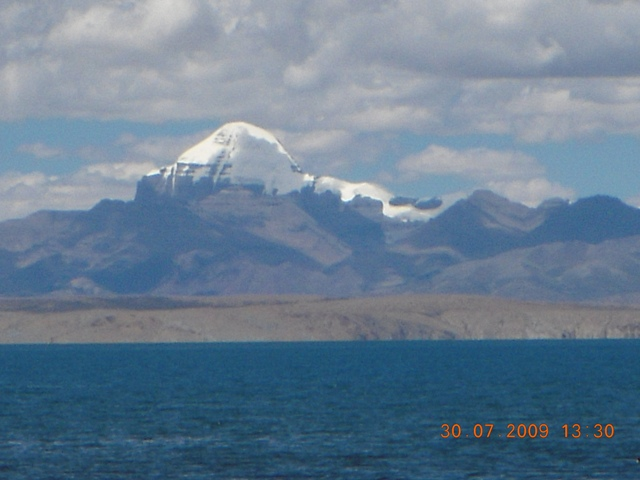
Mount Kailash and Manasarovar from the south

The Lipulekh Pass was one of the passes historically used for Indo-Tibetan border trade by the Bhotiyas of Kumaon. Each of the Bhotiya valleys lying along the border, Gori, Darma, Chaudans and Byans, had its own passes to Tibet. Of these, Chaudansis (in the Kali River valley) and Byansis (in the Kuthi and Tinkar valleys) used the Lipulekh pass. Lipulekh was considered the most "famous" among the passes because it is closest to the Tibetan trading centre Purang, and it also leads directly to Mount Kailash, a pilgrimage destination for Hindus and Buddhists.

In 1791, the Nepalese Gorkha kingdom conquered Kumaon and took possession of the entire region. Border tensions with British colonial regime led to the Anglo-Nepalese War (1814–1816). The British evicted the Nepalese from Kumaon and set the Kali River as the border between Kumaon and Nepal, later confirmed in the Treaty of Sugauli.

However, what was meant by "Kali River" in the upper reaches of the Himalayas became a matter of dispute. Initially, the British retained the Kuthi Valley in the west, the Tinkar Valley in the east, as well as the Kalapani valley leading to the Lipulekh pass, as part of Kumaon. These three valleys carry three head streams to Kali River and are populated by Byansis. Following Nepalese objections, the British Governor-General made enquiries with the local populations as well as the British surveyor (W. J. Webb, who surveyed the area) and decided that the Kalapani valley carried the main Kali River. Accordingly, the Tinkar Valley in the east was ceded to Nepal.

This arrangement would have made the Lipulekh Pass the trijunction between Kumaon, Nepal and Tibet. However, a further adjustment was made around 1865, when the British shifted the border near Lipulekh to the watershed of the Kalapani stream (Note: The stream originates at the Lipulekh Pass and is also called Lipu Gad or Lipu Khola. At Kalapani, there is a small spring which was traditionally considered by the locals as the source of the Kalapani stream and the Kali River.) instead of the stream itself. This made a 35 square kilometre area to the east of Kalapani valley, now known as the Kalapani territory, part of British India. The trijunction between Kumaon, Nepal and Tibet shifted to the vicinity of Tinkar Pass and the Lipulekh Pass became an interior point of British India. There are no extant documents regarding any communications on the issue. However, around the same time that the British claimed the Kalapani territory, they had also ceded to Nepal the western Tarai regions, which were later named "Naya Muluk" ("New Lands") by Nepal. The addition of these regions was of significant economic benefit to Nepal.

The border adjustment made little difference on the ground because a free movement regime operated between Nepal and India, and the Byansis of Tinkar Valley continued to use the Lipulekh Pass. (It has been reported that they were unable to use the Tinkar Pass because of low volume of traffic.) It was only after India restricted the Tinkaris from using Lipulekh Pass after the 1960s that a dispute began to surface.

In 1954, India signed a border trade agreement with China, in which Lipulekh Pass was mentioned as one of the passes that could be used for Indo-Tibetan trade and pilgrimage traffic. A State Police post was established at Kalapani in 1956. In 1961, Nepal signed a border agreement with China, which recognised the trijunction between the three countries being near Tinkar Pass, and a border pillar numbered 1 was placed there.

After the 1962 Sino-Indian War, India closed the Lipulekh Pass. The Byansis of Kumaon then used the Tinkar Pass for all their trade with Tibet. In 1979, the Kalapani post was guarded by Indo-Tibetan Border Police.

In 1991, India and China agreed to reopen the Lipulekh pass, and the trade through it steadily increased.

== Tourism ==
This pass links the Pithoragarh district India with the Tibet Autonomous Region of China, and forms the last territorial point in India's territory. The Kailash Mansarovar Yatra, a Hinduism pilgrimage to Mount Kailash and Lake Manasarovar, traverses this pass. Lipulekh pass is connected to Chang Lobochahela, near the old trading town of Purang (Taklakot), in Tibet.

The yatra operated through the Lipulekh Pass from 1981, with a second route through Nathu La added in 2015; it was suspended after 2019 following the COVID-19 pandemic and the subsequent non-renewal of arrangements by the Chinese side. The pilgrimage resumed in June 2025 after a five-year gap, with five batches of fifty pilgrims crossing at Lipulekh, and continued in 2026 with ten batches of fifty pilgrims scheduled through the pass between June and August.

In 2024, Uttarakhand government has identified a viewpoint on the western shoulder of the pass, which it termed "Old Lipulekh Peak" (30.2488°N 81.0237°E), from where Mount Kailash can be seen.

== India-China Trading Post ==
The pass was the first Indian border post to be opened for trade with China in 1992. This was followed by the opening of Shipki La, Himachal Pradesh in 1994 and Nathu La, Sikkim in 2006. Presently, Lipulekh Pass is open for cross-border trade every year from June through September.

Border trade through the pass was suspended from early 2020 following the COVID-19 pandemic, and remained closed during the subsequent India–China border standoff. In August 2025, during Chinese Foreign Minister Wang Yi's visit to New Delhi, India and China agreed to restart border trade through Lipulekh, Shipki La and Nathu La; Nepal objected to the agreement as concerning territory it claims, an objection India rejected.

Products cleared for export from India include jaggery, misri, tobacco, spices, pulses, fafar flour, coffee, vegetable oil, ghee and various miscellaneous consumable items. The main imports into India include sheep wool, passam, sheep, goats, borax, yak tails, chhirbi (butter) and raw silk. Border trade between India and China through Lipulekh Pass logged Rs 1.5cr in 2026.

== India-China BPM (Border Personnel Meeting) point ==
In 2014, India and China discussed using the pass as an additional official Border Personnel Meeting point between the Indian Army and the People's Liberation Army of China for regular consultations and interactions between the two armies to improve relations.

== Nepalese claims ==
The Nepalese claims to the southern side of the pass, called Kalapani territory, are based on 1816 Sugauli Treaty between British East India Company and Nepal. The treaty delimited the boundary along the Kali River (also called the Sharda River and Mahakali River). India claims that the river begins at the Kalapani village as this is where all its tributaries merge. But Nepal claims that it begins from the Lipulekh Pass. The historical record shows that, some time around 1865, the British shifted the border near Kalapani to the watershed of the Kalapani river instead of the river itself, thereby claiming the area now called the Kalapani territory. This is consistent with the British position that the Kali River begins only from the Kalapani springs, which meant that the agreement of Sugauli did not apply to the region above the springs.

After the Indian prime minister's visit to China in 2015, India and China agreed to open a trading post in Lipulekh, raising objections from Nepal. The Nepalese parliament stated that 'it violates Nepal's sovereign rights over the disputed territory'. Nepal now intends to resolve the issue via diplomatic means with India.

In May 2020, Defence Minister Rajnath Singh inaugurated an 80-kilometre road built by the Border Roads Organisation from Ghatiabagarh to the Lipulekh Pass, reducing the duration of the Kailash Mansarovar pilgrimage from two to three weeks to about one week. Nepal protested the construction of the road through territory it claims, and later that month its cabinet approved a new political map of Nepal incorporating Limpiyadhura, Lipulekh and Kalapani, subsequently enacted through a constitutional amendment. India rejected the map as an "artificial enlargement" of territorial claims not based on historical fact and evidence.

On 30 April 2026, the Ministry of External Affairs announced the resumption of the Kailash Mansarovar Yatra for 2026, to be conducted between June and August in coordination with China. The plan allowed 1,000 pilgrims, travelling in batches of 50, to use two routes: the Lipulekh Pass in Uttarakhand and Nathu La in Sikkim. The yatra had been suspended since 2020 due to the COVID-19 pandemic.

On 3 May 2026, Nepal's Ministry of Foreign Affairs formally objected to the use of the Lipulekh route, stating that Limpiyadhura, Lipulekh and Kalapani east of the Mahakali River are integral parts of Nepal under the Treaty of Sugauli, and that neither India nor China had consulted Kathmandu. India rejected the objection, with MEA spokesperson Randhir Jaiswal stating that the yatra had been conducted via Lipulekh since 1954 and that Nepal's claims were "neither justified nor based on historical facts and evidence". India described any unilateral enlargement of territorial claims as "untenable", while affirming openness to resolving outstanding boundary issues through dialogue.

== See also ==
- Nathu La
- Shipki La
- Pithoragarh district
- Dharchula

== Bibliography ==
- Atkinson, Edwin Thomas (1981) [first published 1884], The Himalayan Gazetteer, Volume 2, Part 2, Cosmo Publications – via archive.org
- Atkinson, Edwin Thomas (1981) [first published 1884], The Himalayan Gazetteer, Volume 3, Part 2, Cosmo Publications – via archive.org
- Cowan, Sam (2015), The Indian checkposts, Lipu Lekh, and Kalapani, School of Oriental and African Studies
- Gupta, Alok Kumar (June–December 2009) [2000], "The Context of New-Nepal: Challenges and Opportunities for India", Indian Journal of Asian Affairs, 22 (1/2): 57–73, JSTOR 41950496. IPCS preprint
- Strachey, Lieut. H. (September 1848), James Prinsep (ed.), "Narration of a Journey to Cho Lagan, (Rakas Tal), Cho Mapan (Manasarowar), and the valley of Pruang in Gnari, Hundes, in September and October 1846", The Journal of the Asiatic Society of Bengal, 17: 98–120, 127–182, 327–351
- Walton, H. G., ed. (1911), Almora: A Gazetteer, District Gazetteers of the United Provinces of Agra and Oudh, vol. 35, Government Press, United Provinces – via archive.org
- Whelpton, John (2005), A History of Nepal, Cambridge University Press, ISBN 978-0-521-80470-7
