= India–Tibet relations =

Relations between Tibet and India

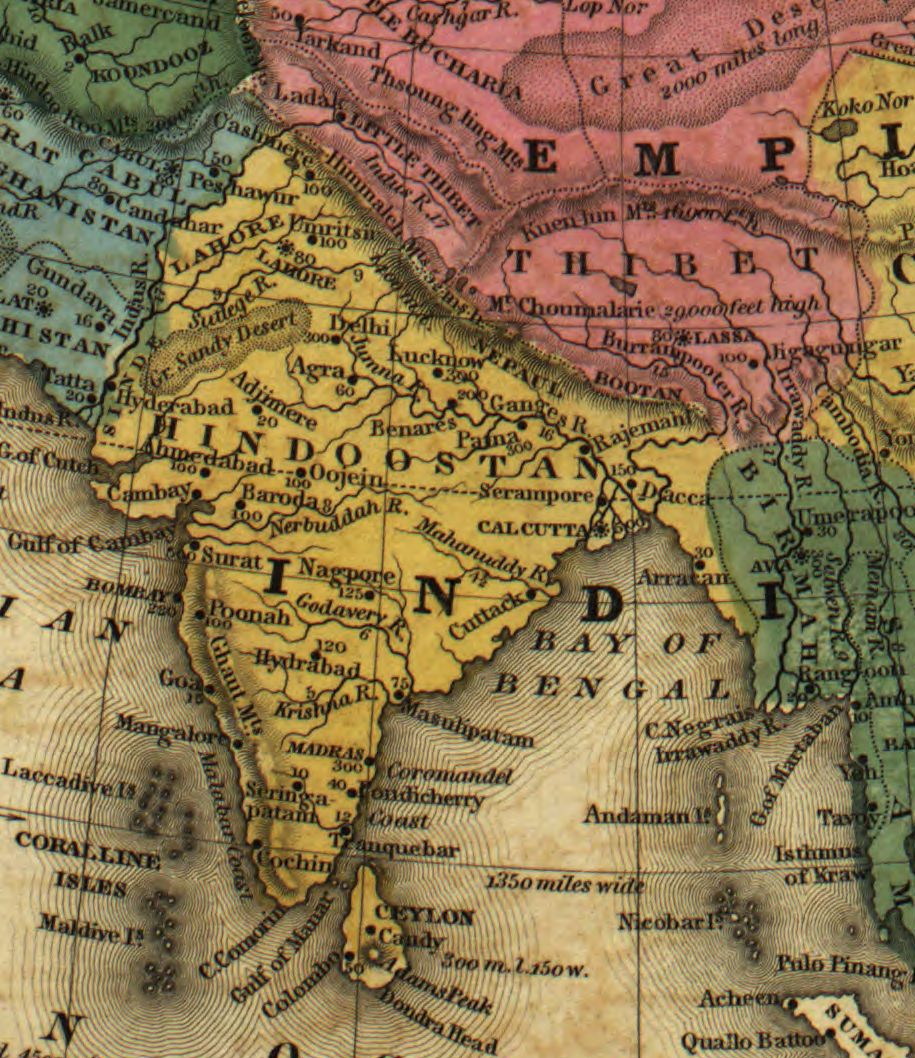
- India: Tibet

Diplomatic mission
- None: Tibet Office

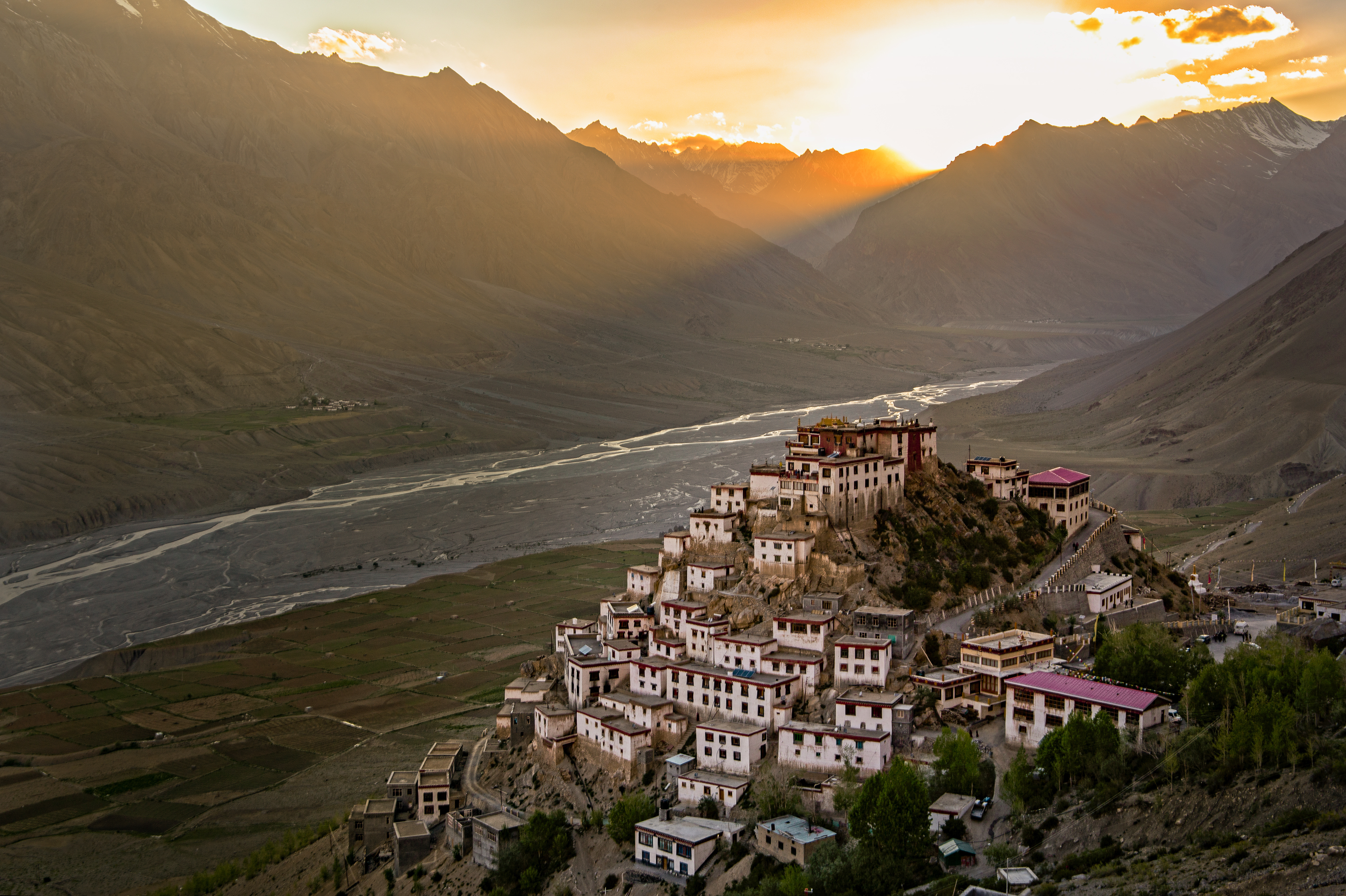
Kye Gompa is a Tibetan Buddhist monastery located in the Spiti Valley of Himachal Pradesh, India.

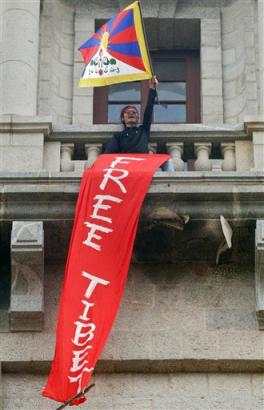
Tenzin Tsundue protesting across from Chinese Premiere Wen Jiabao's hotel room in Bangalore in 2005.

Tibet–India relations are said to have begun during the spread of Buddhism to Tibet from India during the 6th century CE. During the Tibetan Empire, Tibet controlled the Silk road routes around and through the Tibetan plateau, and from Tang China to Indian kingdoms. Their relations continued through the centuries and in c.1908 and 1912, India gave shelter to the 13th Dalai Lama during Qing China's failed invasion of Tibet, before the Qing collapsed and surrendered. India continued to support Tibet during the ROC China's Simla Accord. In 1959, the 14th Dalai Lama escaped from Lhasa to India after the 1959 Tibetan uprising, when Tibet rescinded its Seventeen Point Agreement with PRC China. The Tibetan diaspora followed the Dalai Lama into India.

Since then, Tibetans-in-exile have been given asylum in India, with the Indian government accommodating them into 45 residential settlements across 10 states in the country, homes of the Tibetan diaspora. From around 150,000 Tibetan refugees in 2011, the number fell to 85,000 in 2018, according to government data. Many Tibetans are now leaving India to go back to Tibet and other countries such as United States or Germany. The Government of India, soon after India's independence in 1947, treated Tibet as an independent country. However, more recently India's policy on Tibet has been mindful of China, and has recognized Tibet as a part of China.

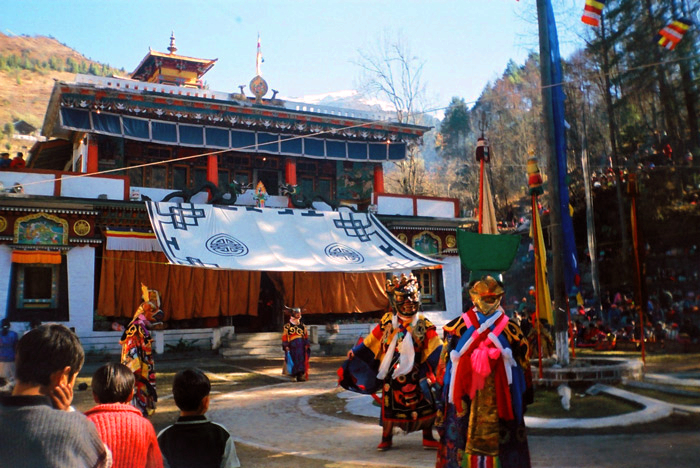
Gumpa dance, Lachung Monastery, Sikkim, India

== History ==
Scholars like Buton Rinchen Drub (Bu-ston) have suggested that Tibetans are descendants of Rupati, a Kaurava military general from the historical Kurukshetra War. Other scholars point to the spread of Buddhism to Tibet from India through the efforts of Tibetan kings, Songtsen Gampo and Trisong-Detsen as the first significant contact. The 13th Dalai Lama, Thubten Gyatso, had visited the Indian subcontinent in 1910. Today, Tibetan pilgrims visit Gaya, Sarnath and Sanchi, places that are connected to the life of Buddha.

The Tibetan king Songtsen allied with the Maukhari king Śarvavarman and the Kamarupa king Supratiṣṭhita-varman against Mahāsenagupta. Later, Ādityasena's reign marked the end of the influence of the Tibetan Empire in Mithila region, allowing him to incorporate the region into his domain.

Tibet and China invaded northern India in the 7th century to punish a hostile king. Later on, Tibet adopted Indianized Buddhism after Indian Buddhists won against Chinese Buddhists in a debate organized by the Tibetan emperor. Indians regularly visited Tibet during the Era of Fragmentation, seeking Tibet's abundance in gold under the guise of religious pilgrimages. In the 13th century, the Delhi Sultanate of Hindustan launched a disastrous invasion of Tibet. The Mughal Empire of Hindustan later relinquished influence over Ladakh to Tibet.

=== British Raj (1767–1947) ===
In 1779, the third Panchen Lama, was well disposed to East India Company agents from British India. Treaties regarding Tibet were concluded between Britain and China in the 1880s and 1890s but the Tibetan government refused to recognize their legitimacy.

A British expedition to Tibet, effectively an invasion, under the command of Brigadier-General James Macdonald and Col. Francis Younghusband began in December 1903 and lasted for around ten months. Following this the Convention Between Great Britain and Tibet was signed in 1904; essentially the treaty imposed upon the Tibetans numerous points such as payment of a large indemnity to the British. This treaty was followed by a Sino-British treaty in 1906 in which the British agreed not to annex Tibet and China agreed "not to permit any other foreign state to interfere with the territory or internal administration of Tibet".

The Qing sent a military expedition to Tibet in 1910, Lhasa was occupied, and the Dalai Lama had to flee to British India, where he stayed for around three years. During 1904–1947, over 100 British-Indian officials lived and worked in Tibet.

=== Independent India (1947–1962) ===
In August 1947, the Government of India inherited the treaties of the British Raj with regard to Tibet. The British Mission in Lhasa became India's diplomatic mission. The Government of India made it evident in its correspondence that it regarded Tibet as a de facto country. (Note: In this, independent India followed the British India's policy, e.g., "an informal memorandum from Foreign Secretary Eden which stated that since 1911 Tibet had enjoyed de facto independence and opposed Chinese attempts to reassert control".) This was not unique to India, as Nepal and Mongolia also had treaties with Tibet. A few months before India's independence, an Asian Conference was held in New Delhi, to which Tibet was invited. Along with the flags of other countries participating, Tibet's flag was flown.

In August 1950 a Tibetan delegation and representatives of the People's Republic of China sat for negotiations in New Delhi. Following the Chinese annexation of Tibet in October of that year, India sent a note of protest. India's Deputy Prime Minister Sardar Vallabhbhai Patel wrote, "The tragedy of it is that the Tibetans put faith in us; they chose to be guided by us; and we have been unable to get them out of the meshes of Chinese diplomacy or Chinese malevolence."

In 1954, China and India signed a trade agreement that would regulate the trade between the two countries with respect to Tibet. This trade agreement ended India's centuries-old free trade with Tibet.

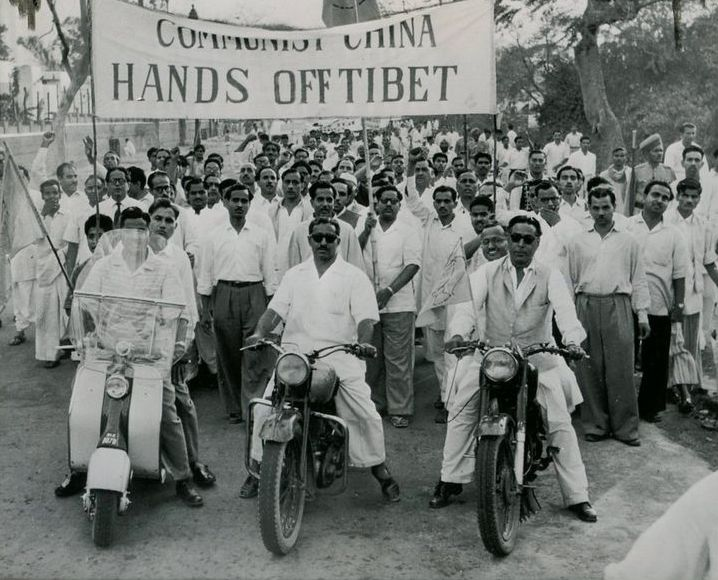
A protest in India in 1958

Acharya Kriplani said of Tibet in the Lok Sabha in 1959, "It was a nation which wanted to live its own life and it sought to have been allowed to live its own life. A good government is no substitute for self-government." Jaya Prakash Narayan had said "Tyrannies have come and gone and Caesars and Czars and dictators. But the spirit of man goes on forever. Tibet will be resurrected." However, the Indian press commented on the silence of the government during the time and noted that the government could do little to help Tibet, even after a United Nations General Assembly resolution in 1961 that mentioned Tibet's right to self-determination.

India's diplomatic mission in Lhasa in 1952 was downgraded into a consulate general, and, after the 1962 Sino-Indian War, closed. At the time, there were three countries that had missions in Lhasa: Bhutan, Nepal and India; only Nepal's mission remains. India has requested China over the years to allow the re-opening of a consulate in Lhasa; however, China has not accepted.

=== 2000 onwards ===
More recently, India's policy on Tibet has been based on trying not to offend China. Although Lobsang Sangay was invited to Prime Minister Modi's swearing-in ceremony in 2014 and the Chief Minister of Arunachal Pradesh Pema Khandu declared that his state had a border with Tibet and not with China in 2017. A major shift in policy came in April 2018 after the Modi-Xi Jinping summit in Wuhan with the foreign ministry issuing a circular to dissuade government officials from going to Tibetan functions where the Dalai Lama or Tibetan government in exile were present. All events marking 60 years of the Tibetan government in exile were moved from New Delhi to Dharamshala. During the 2020 border skirmishes and standoff between China and India, Shyam Sharan called "the tactical use of the Tibetan issue and of the Dalai Lama is both cynical and counter-productive"; he was referring to the use of the Special Frontier Force and the subsequent media coverage. New Delhi was accused of using the Tibetans as a bargaining card only when tensions with China are high.

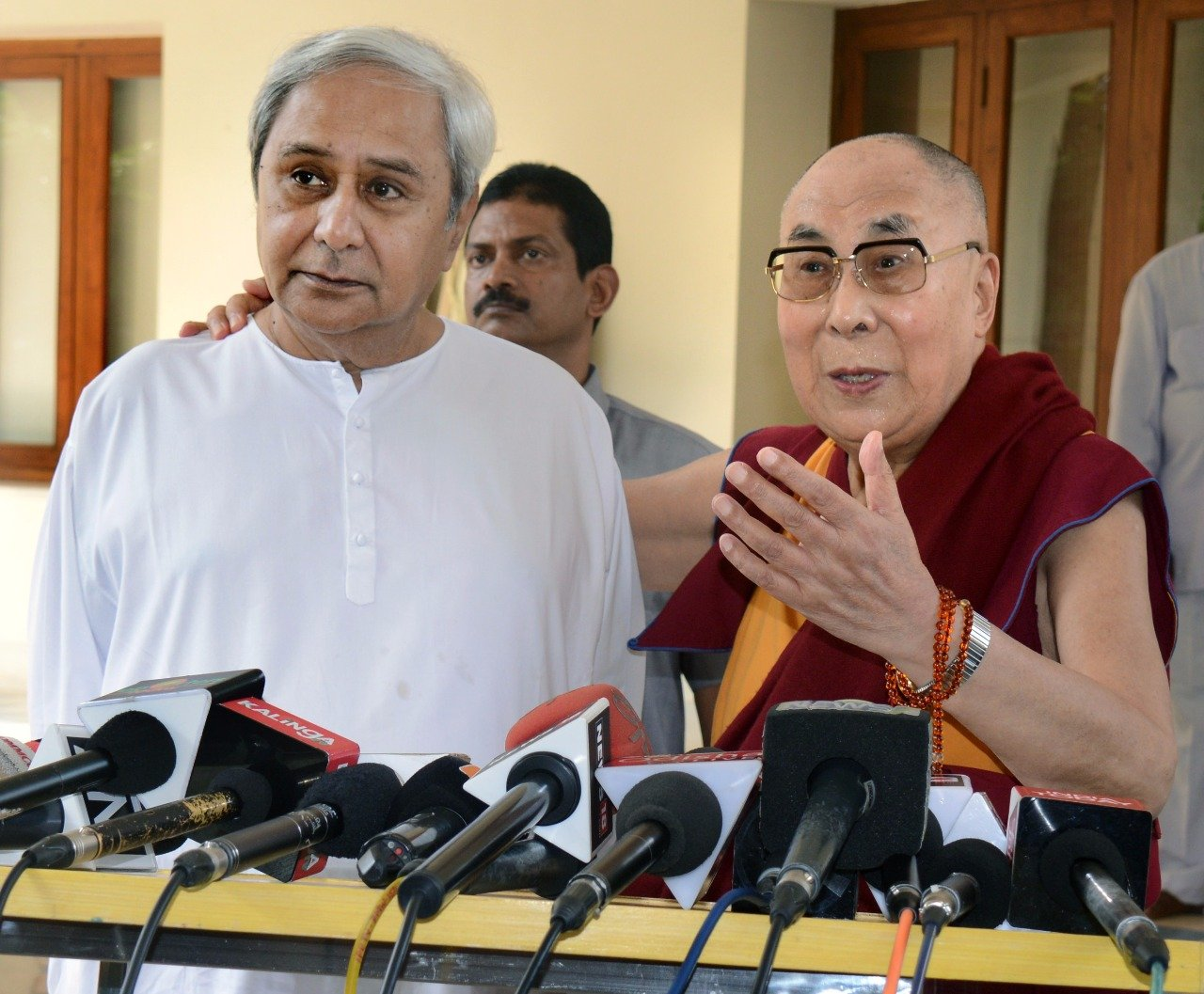
Naveen Patnaik and Dalai Lama in 2017

== India's position on Tibet Autonomous Region ==
In 1988, following Prime Minister Rajiv Gandhi's visit, the first visit of an Indian Prime Minister to China since 1954, a joint press communique read, "the Indian side reiterated the long-standing and consistent policy of the Government of India that Tibet is an autonomous region of China [...]".

After Prime Minister Atal Bihari Vajpayee visit to China in June 2003, a joint declaration was signed in which India recognised that "the Tibet Autonomous Region is part of the territory of the People's Republic of China". In Chinese view, this meant that India had, for "the first time", officially recognised Tibet as "part of China". Some Indian and western commentators interpret it to mean that India had recognised China's "sovereignty" over Tibet. In return China, over a period of time, incrementally took steps to acknowledge India's sovereignty over Sikkim. Brahma Chellaney has written that India's recognition of Chinese sovereignty over Tibet constituted its "single biggest security blunder".

== Exile in India ==
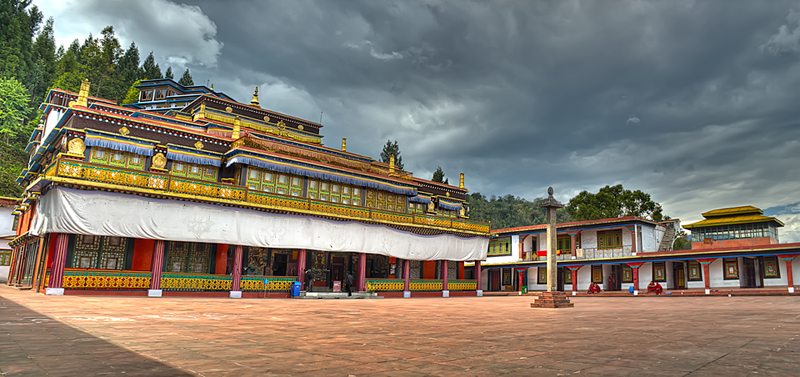
Rumtek Monastery is a Tibetan Buddhist monastery located near Gangtok, Sikkim, India

The 14th Dalai Lama escaped from Tibet to India in March 1959 following the failed 1959 Tibetan uprising. On reaching India, the Chushi Gangdruk, who had assisted the Dalai Lama in his escape, handed over all their weapons to the Indian authorities. China would not have accepted Sikkim as part of India if Atal Bihari Vajpayee had not agreed to recognize Tibet as part of China in 2003. The formal recognition of Sikkim by China was closely tied to India's acknowledgment of Tibet as part of China. The diplomatic agreement was a reciprocal arrangement: India agreed to recognize Tibet as a Chinese region, and in return, China recognized Sikkim as part of India. Since 1959, for over 60 years, India has given exiled Tibetans shelter. The Central Tibetan Administration (CTA), also known as the Tibetan government-in-exile, was formed in 1959 and is headquartered in Dharamshala, Himachal Pradesh, India. In 1991 the CTA became a founding member of the Unrepresented Nations and Peoples Organization (UNPO). In 2009, a survey by the CTA recorded 94,203 Tibetan refugees in India. The Indian government officially recognises Tibetans only as 'foreigners' and not as refugees.

A CTA functionary said in 2019:

China has occupied Tibet and we expect India has the only legitimacy and credibility to speak about Tibet [...] It is due to India's consistent generosity and kindness, we, the people in exile, have been able to preserve our ancient cultural heritage in exile

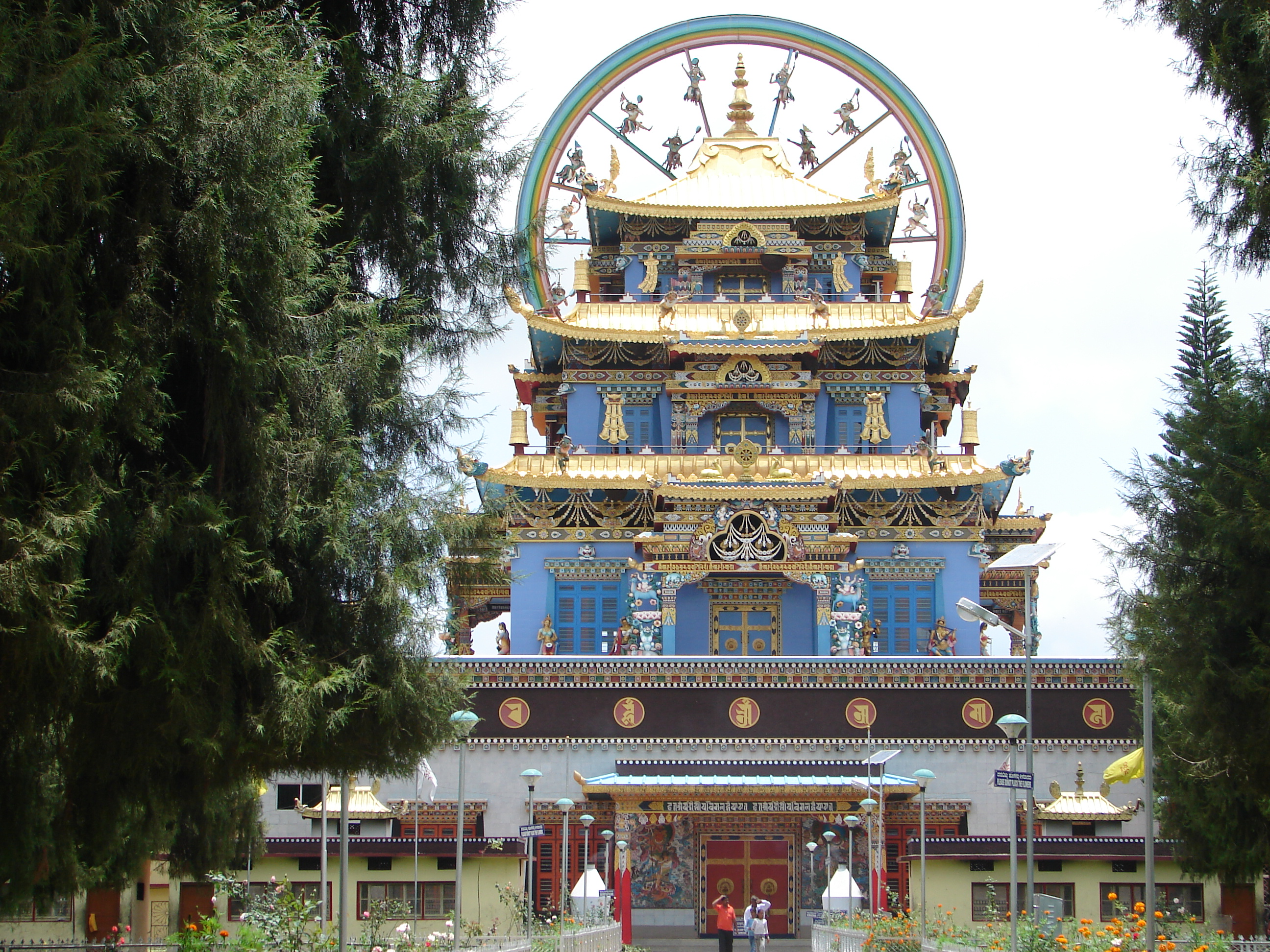
The Golden temple at the Tibetan settlement in Khushalnagar, Coorg district, Karnataka, India

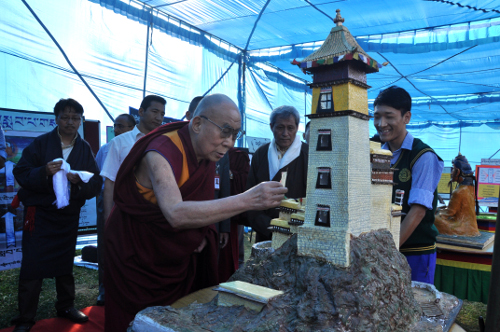
The Dalai Lama visiting the Tibetan Children's Villages student art centre at Gopalpur, Himachal Pradesh

Tibetans in India have been accommodated by the Indian government in 45 residential settlements across 10 states in the country. There are 59 monasteries across India. Tibetan children are provided free education, and seats are reserved for them in universities. However, they are not eligible for government jobs, and in some states they cannot get loans and are not allowed to drive. Tibetans refugees in India cannot own land or property. In 2017, 60 years after coming to India, the Indian government permitted Tibetans to get passports. In 2018 it was reported that many Tibetans are leaving India for better opportunities elsewhere, including Tibet. From around 150,000 Tibetan refugees in 2011 the number fell to 85,000 in 2019, according to government data. While some are going back to Tibet, other Tibetans are leaving India for countries such as United States and Switzerland. In 2018, due to Chinese presence, India had shifted its stance with respect to Tibet, resulting in the Dalai Lama calling on Tibetans to stay united.

== Special Frontier Force ==
The Special Frontier Force (SFF), an elite commando unit formed in 1962 to conduct covert operations behind Chinese lines, consists of Tibetan refugees in India. During the 2020 China–India skirmishes media reports emerged of the death of a Tibetan–Indian soldier of the SFF, Nyima Tenzin. On 8 September, images and videos appeared in the media of his public funeral and cremation with full state honors. His coffin was covered with both the Indian and Tibetan flags. However while media covered the event, the leadership in India remained silent. Ram Madhav, who was seen at the funeral paying his respects, tweeted about the event, "Attended the funeral of SFF Coy Ldr Nyima Tenzin, a Tibetan who laid down his life protecting our borders in Ladakh, and laid a wreath as a tribute. Let the sacrifices of such valiant soldiers bring peace along the Indo-Tibetan border. That will be the real tribute to all martyrs." Ram Madhav later deleted his tweet.

== India–Tibet trade ==
=== Bengal–Lhasa route via Kalimpong ===
By 1924, "half the entire trade between Tibet and India" was through the Bengal–Lhasa route via Kalimpong. However this route is no longer open. There has been talk of opening up a Lhasa to Kolkata road and rail link via Sikkim. However a recent attempt at re-opening Nathu La resulted in underperforming trade.

== Cultural relations ==
Buddhism and knowledge stored in the Sanskrit language are a large part of the Tibetan culture.

== Gallery ==
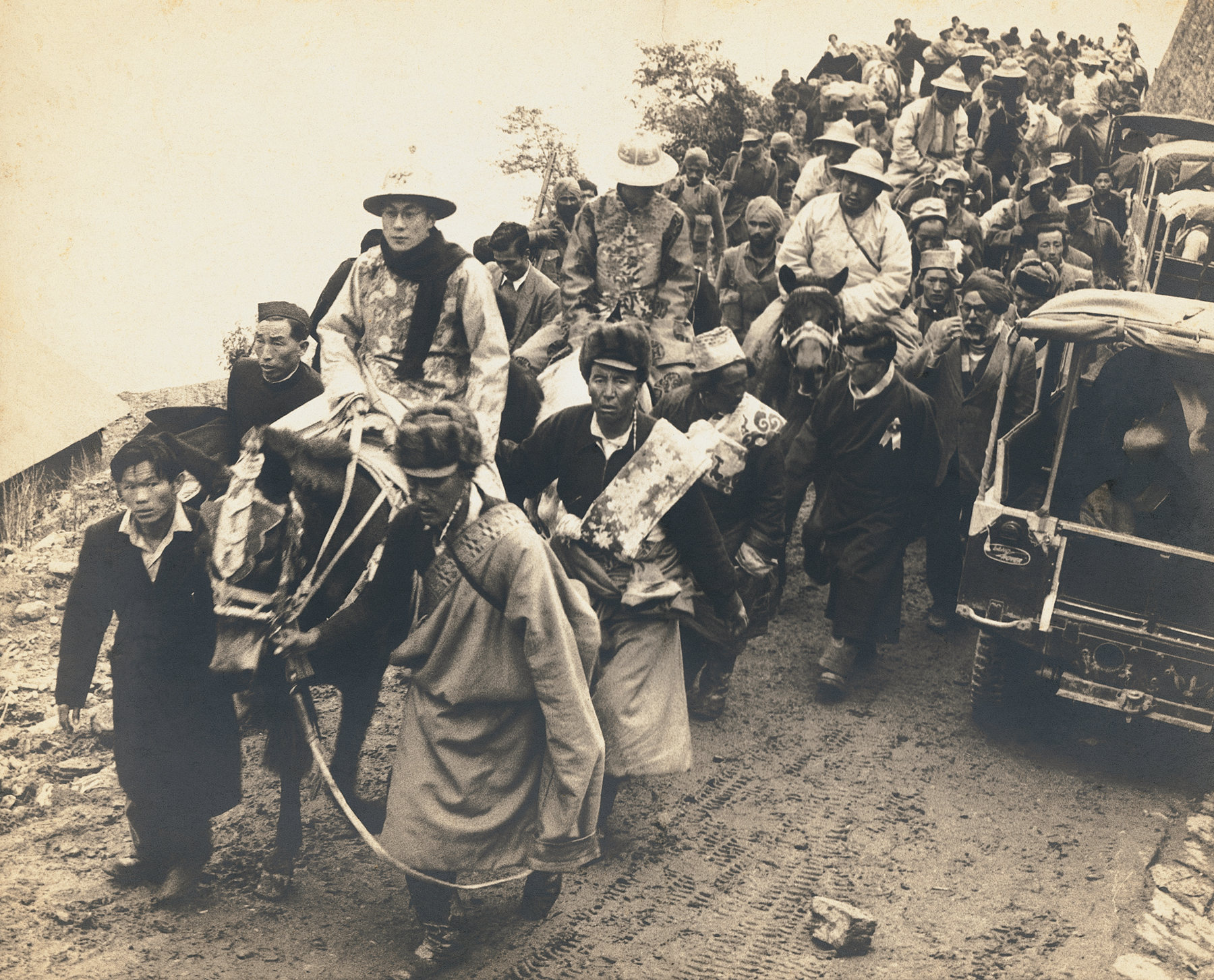
The 14th Dalai Lama in ceremonial dress enters India through a high mountain pass, Sikkim, 1956

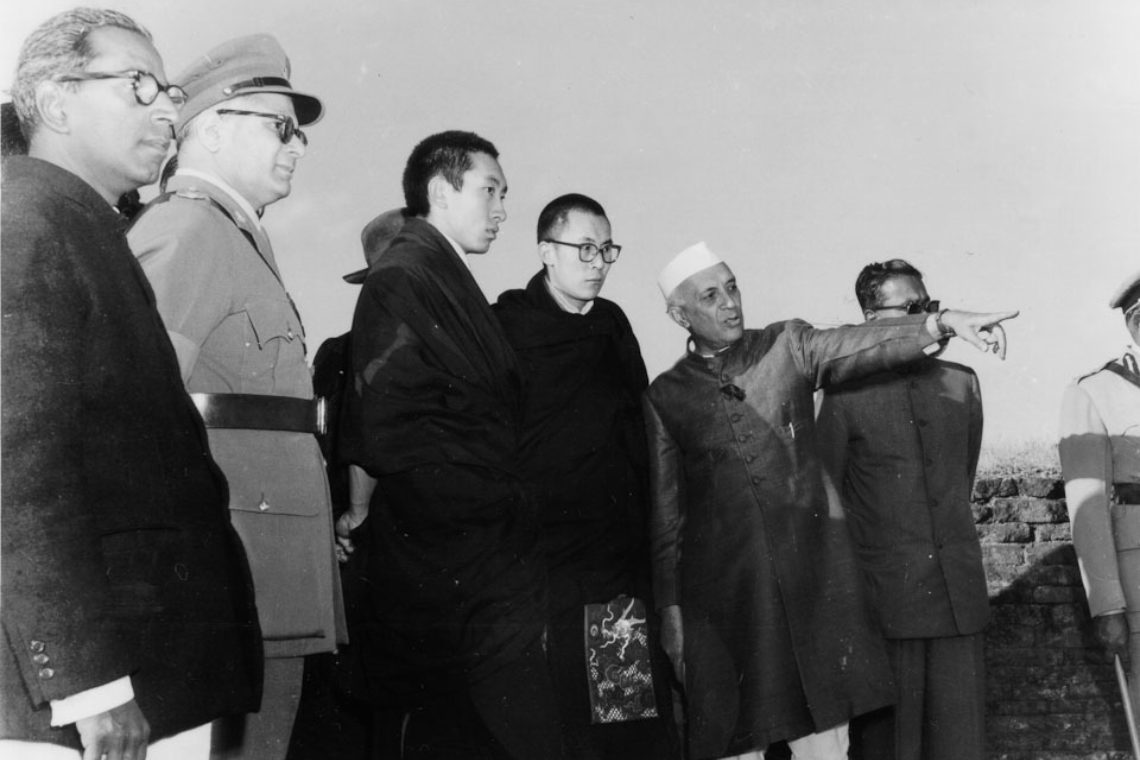
Prime Minister Nehru pointing out a landmark to the Dalai Lama and the Panchen Lama, 1956

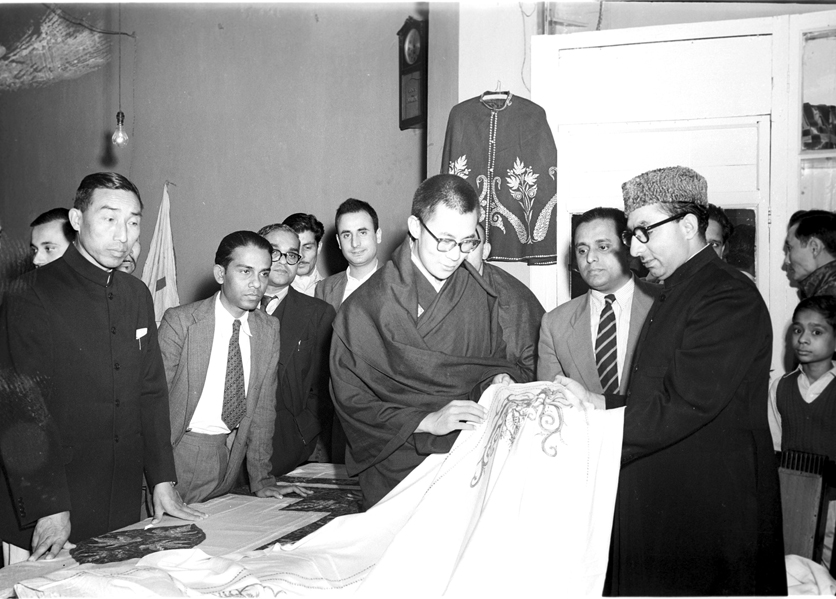
Dalai Lama visits the Kashmir Art Emporium at Calcutta, during his visit to the city, on January 21, 1957

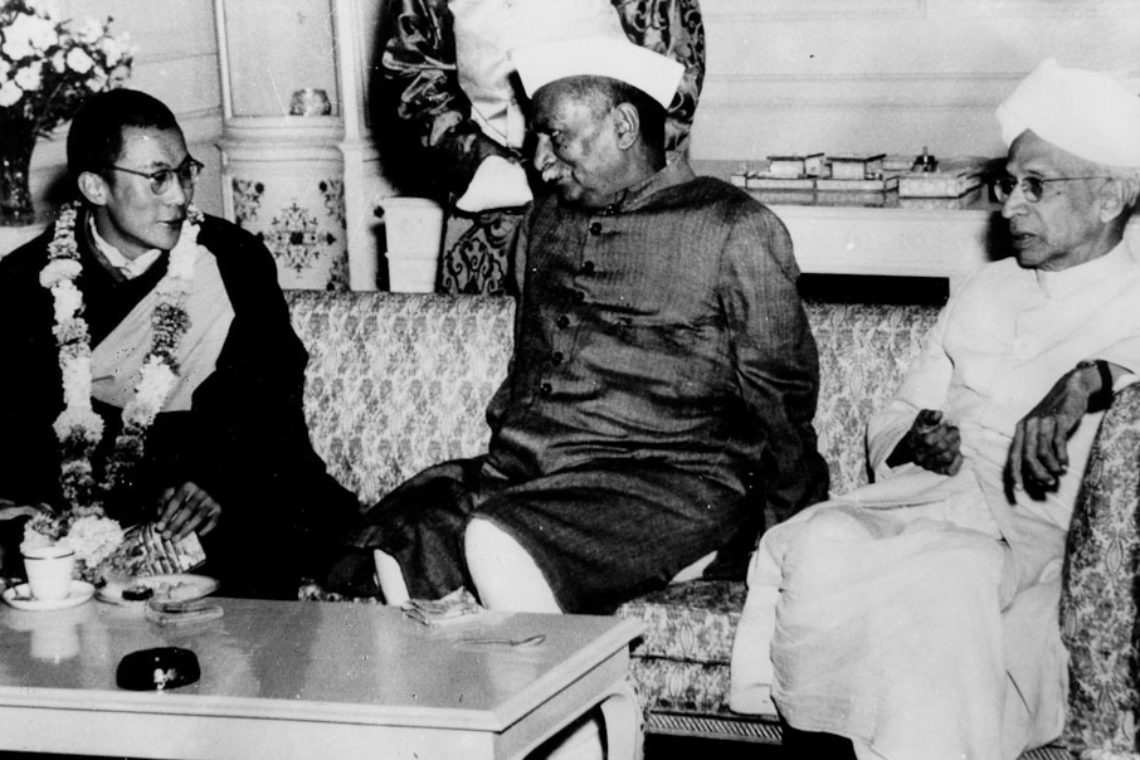
The Dalai Lama with President Rajendra Prasad and Vice President S Radhakrishnan

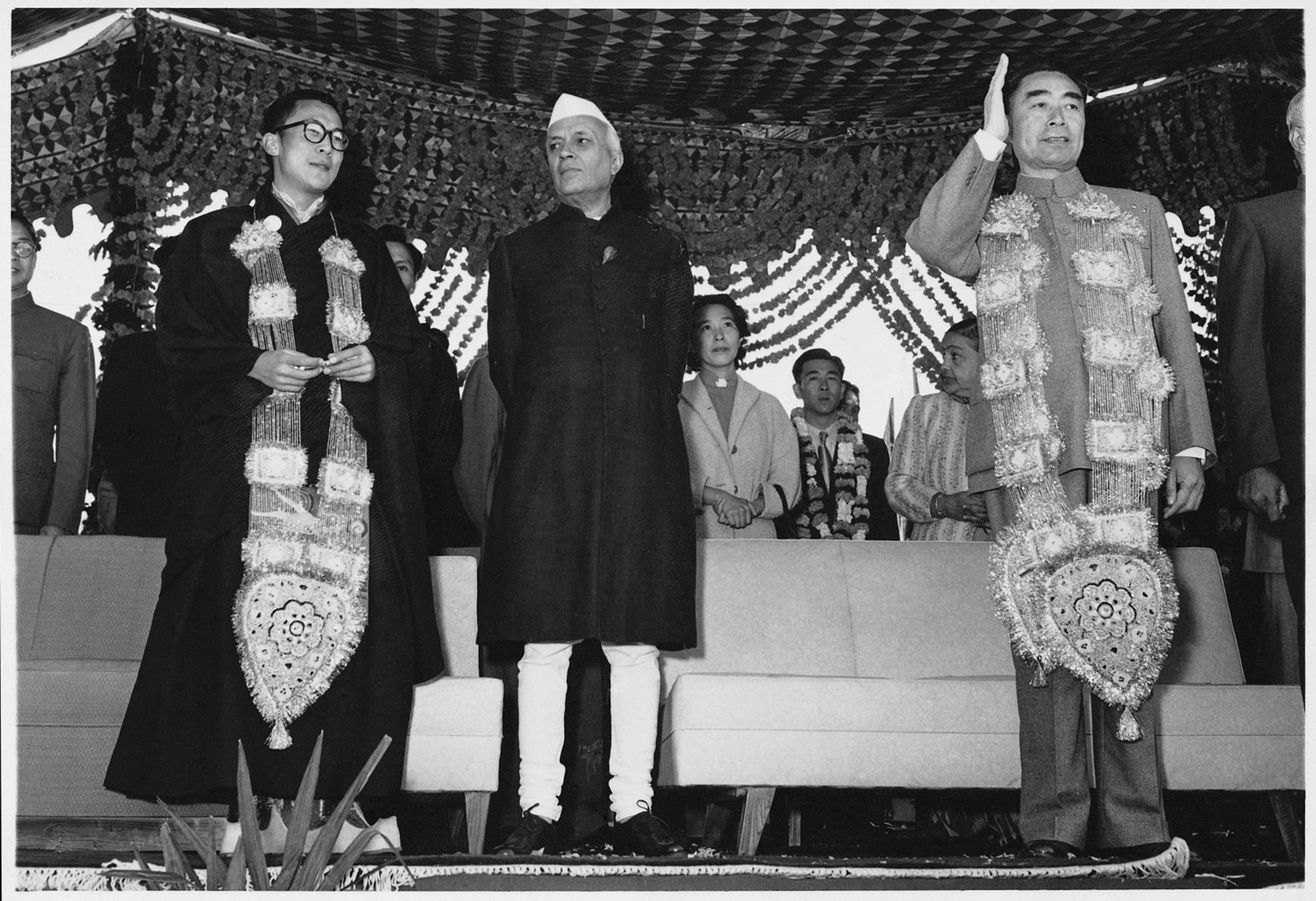
The Dalai Lama, Nehru and Zhou Enlai in 1956 in India, at the UNESCO Buddhist Conference in Ashok Hotel, New Delhi.

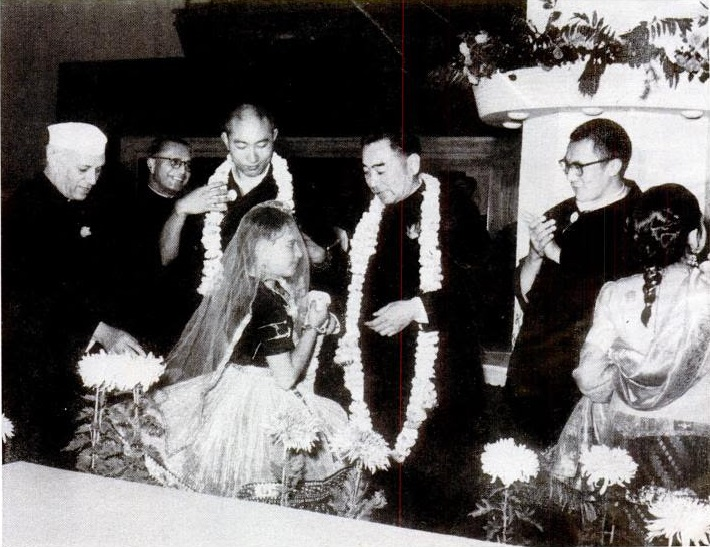
The Dalai Lama at Chou En-Lai's side in 1956; Nehru is on the left

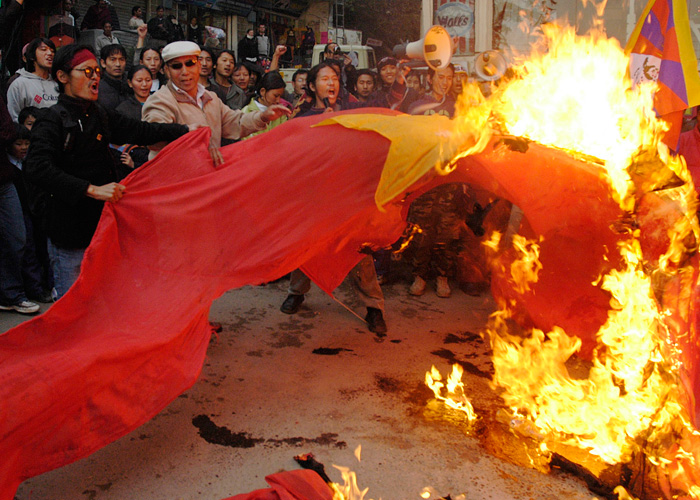
Protest against China in India, 19 April 2008. Visible on left is Tibetan activist Tenzin Tsundue.

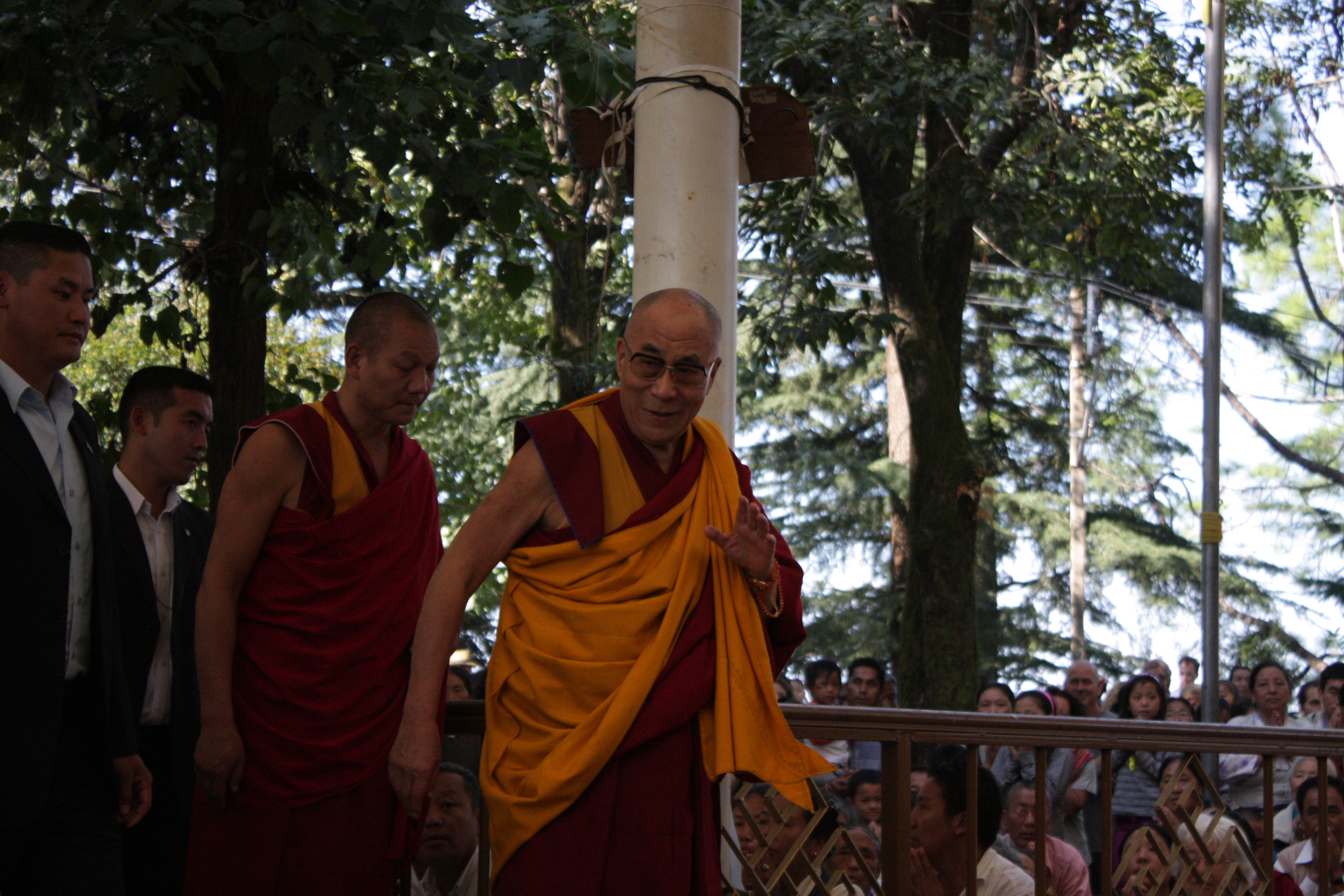
The 14th Dalai Lama in Dharamsala, 2012

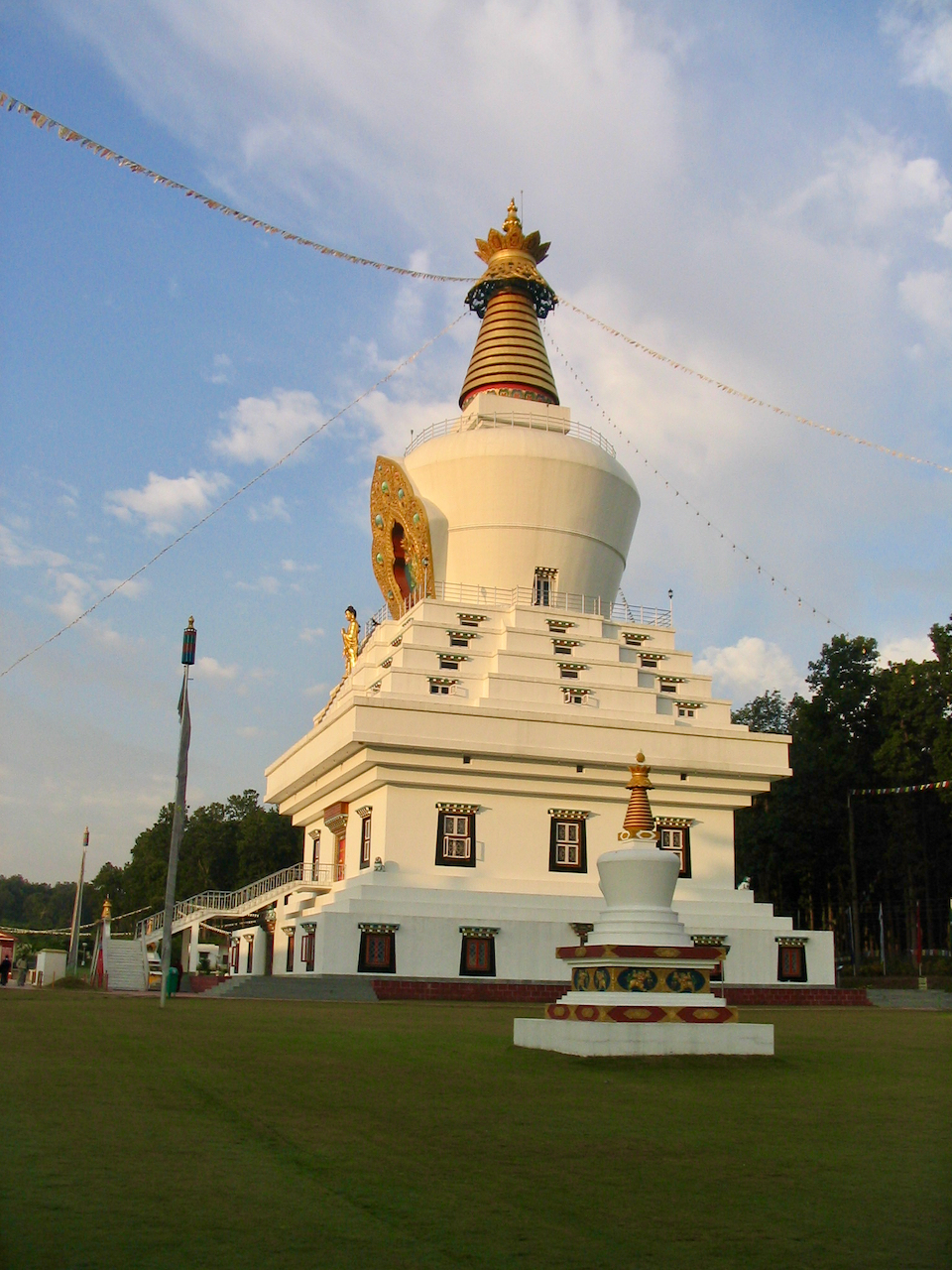
Mindrolling stupa at Dehradun

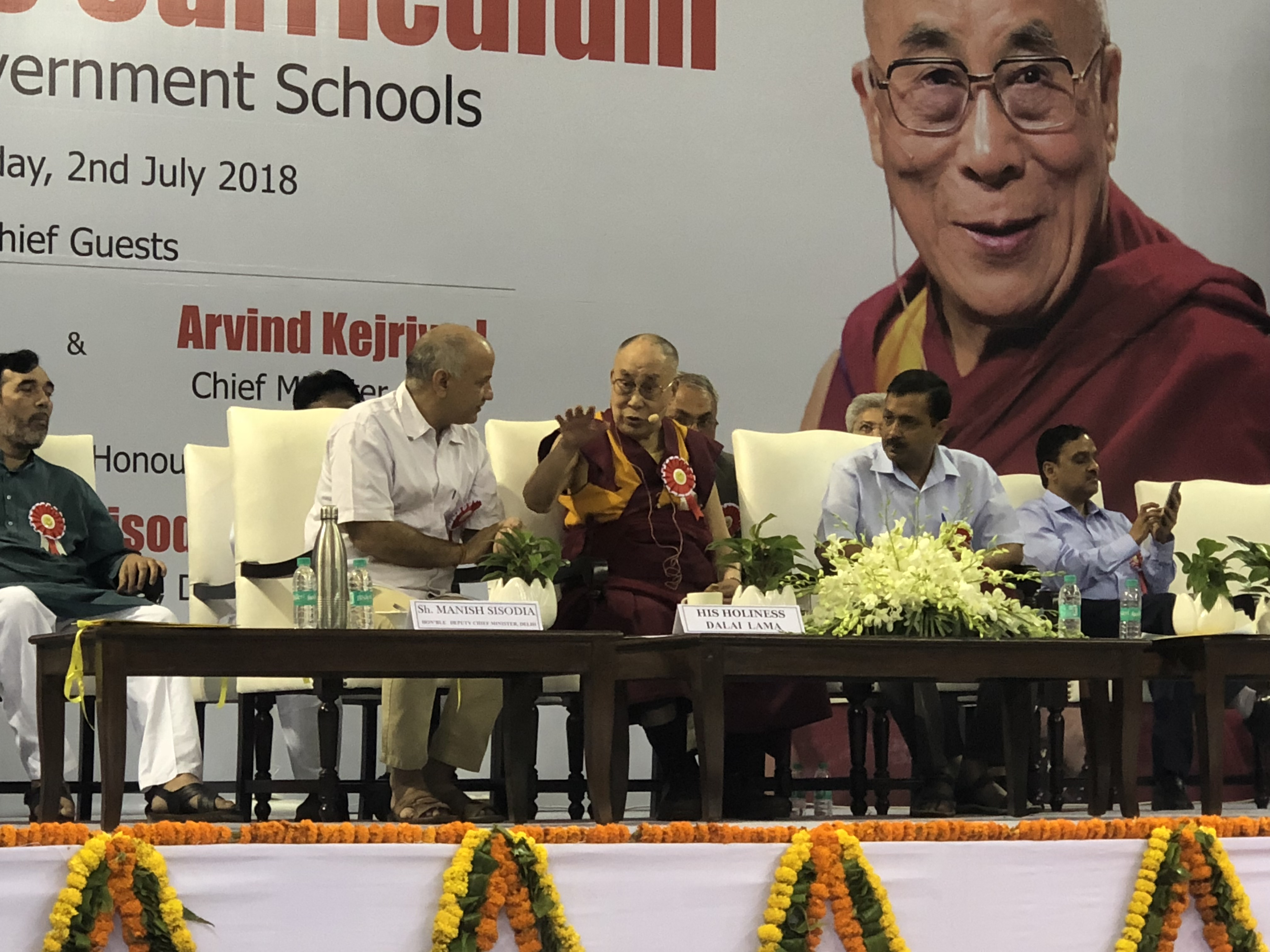
Dalai Lama, Manish Sisodia and Arvind Kejriwal at the launch of the Happiness Curriculum, 2018

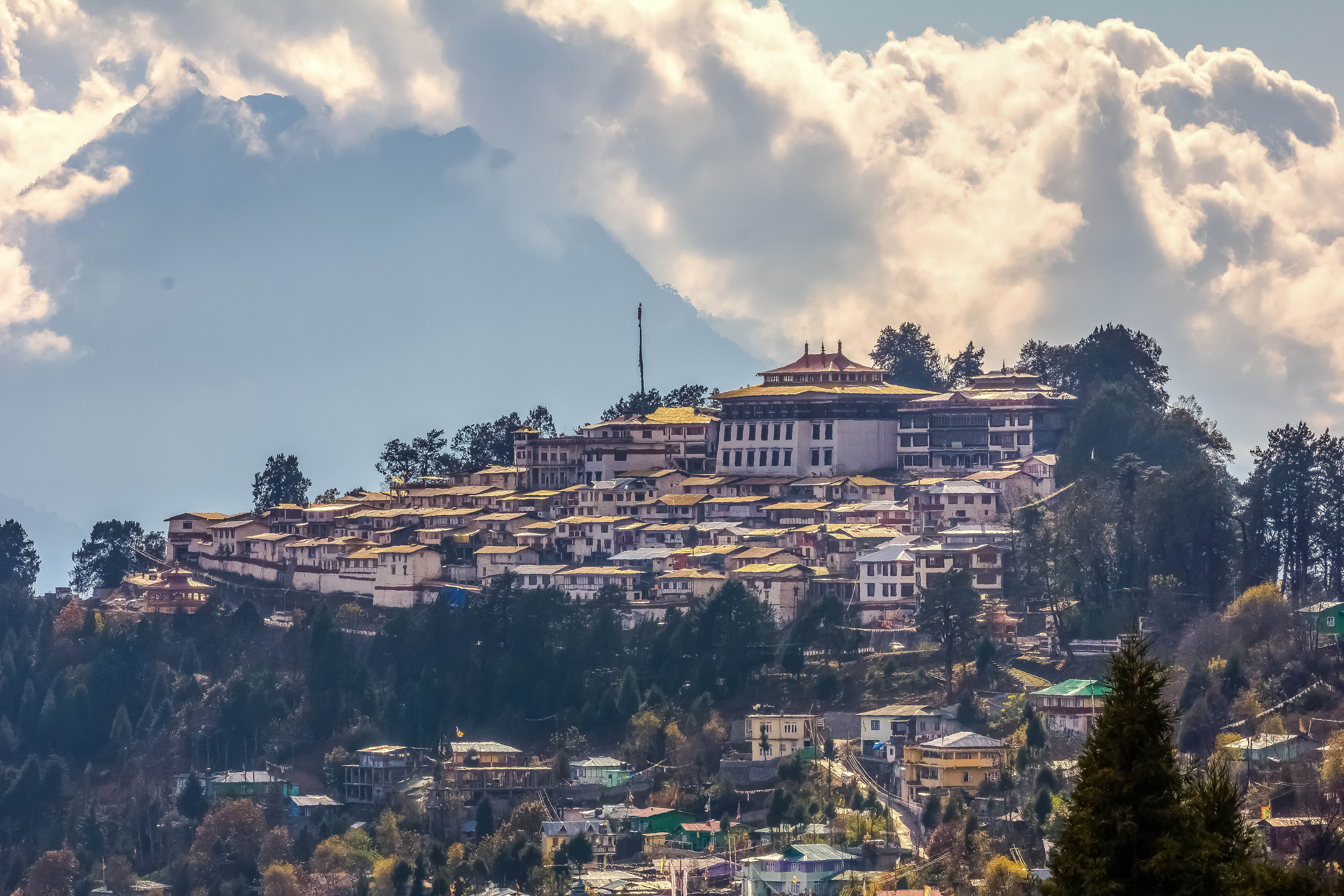
Tawang Monastery located in Tawang, Arunachal Pradesh. It the largest monastery in India and second largest in the world.

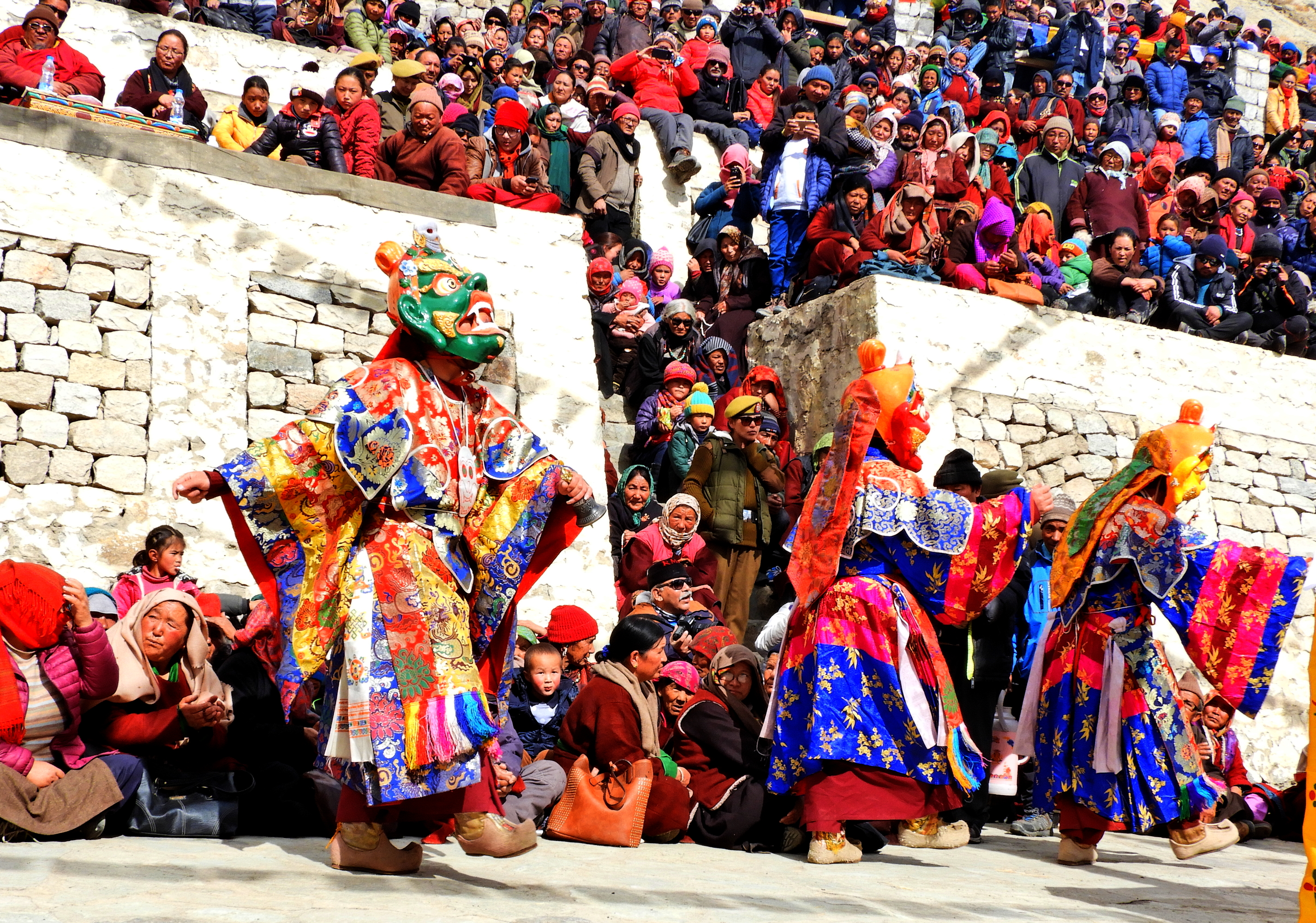
Cham dance during Dosmoche festival in Leh Palace

== See also ==
- Barkor Khache
- Foreign relations of Tibet
- Tibet House
- Tibet's relations with Northeast India
