= Darmiya language =

Sino-Tibetan language spoken in India

Darma
- Darmiya
- Native to: India
- Region: Uttarakhand
- Native speakers: 1,750 (2006)
- Language family: Sino-Tibetan: Tibeto-Kanauri ?; West Himalayish; Almora; Darma

Language codes
- ISO 639-3: drd
- Glottolog: darm1243
- ELP: Darma

Darmiya or Darma is a Sino-Tibetan language spoken in the Darma Valley, Dharchula Tehsil, Pithoragarh District of the Indian state of Uttarakhand. It is one of the fifteen tribes, as stated in The Constitution (Scheduled Tribes) Uttar Pradesh Order, 1967 (C.O. 78) in clause (1) of Article 342 of the Constitution of India. Mostly it is called Bhotia; Bhotia is the broad term used in Himalayan region: several communities and languages are considered under this term. This tribal language is the member of west Tibeto-Burman language family in the Himalayan region of Uttarakhand. It is related to Rangas, Rongpo, Chaudangsi, and Byangsi. Alternate names for this language include Darma, Darma Lwo, Darma-Lwo, Darmani, Saukas, and Shaukas.

Information about the language was first published in Grierson's Linguistic Survey of India, and it has been studied by Krishnamurti, Cristina Wills, K. Srikumar, Kavita Rastogi, Ashish Kumar Pandey and Vishnu Singh.

Darmiya language has 34 phonemes in which 8 vowels and 28 consonants have occurred, there are five long vowels and three short vowels.

== Geographical distribution ==
Darmiya is spoken in the Dhauli valley, from Tawaghat near Dharchula south to Sipoo in the north along Dhauli river. This area is located in Dharchula and Munsiyari tehsils, Pithoragarh district, Uttarakhand, India. Darmiya is spoken in Dar, Bongling, Selachal, Nanglin, Baling, Dugtu, Saung, Baun, Philam, Datu, Gwo, Marchha, Dhakar, Sobla, and Sipoo villages.

== Phonology ==
The Darmiya language contains the following consonant phonemes:

Consonants
			Bilabial	Dental	Alveolar	Post- alveolar	Palatal	Retroflex	Velar
Nasal			m	n̪			ɲ	ɳ	ŋ
Stop	voiceless	unaspirated	p	t̪	t͡s	t͡ʃ		ʈ	k
Stop	voiceless	aspirated	pʰ	t̪ʰ		t͡ʃʰ		ʈʰ	kʰ
Stop	voiced	unaspirated	b	d̪			ɟ	ɖ	g
Stop	voiced	aspirated						ɖʰ	gʰ
Fricative					s		ʝ		x
Approximant					l		j		
Rhotic					r			ɽ	

The language contains the following vowels:

Vowels
	Front	Central	Back
Close	i		u
Close-Mid	e	ɘ	o
Open-mid	ɛ	ɘ	ɔ
Open			ɑ
