= Sunsera =

Sunsera सुनसेरा
- Village development committee
- Location in Nepal
- Coordinates: 29.92°N 80.69°E
- Country: Nepal
- Zone: Mahakali Zone
- District: Darchula District

Population (1991)
  - Total: 2,665
- Time zone: UTC+5:45 (Nepal Time)

Sunsera is a village development committee in Darchula District in the Mahakali Zone of western Nepal. At the time of the 1991 Nepal census it had a population of 2665 people living in 467 individual households.
