= Dhaulakot =

Dhaulakot व्याँस-५, धौलाकोट
- Ward Rural Municipality
- Dhaulakot
- Nickname: "स्याँकु"
- Motto: "कत्युरका राना दुध भात खाना बाह्र हात झकुलिका अठार हात ताना"
- Location in Nepal
- Coordinates: 29.95°N 80.61°E
- Country: Nepal
- Zone: Mahakali Zone
- District: Darchula District
- Established: 10.52 KM2

Government
  - Type: Mayor–council government

Area
  - Total: 10.52 km^{2} (4.06 sq mi)

Population (2011)
  - Total: 1,906
  - Density: 0.0055/km^{2} (0.014/sq mi)
- Time zone: UTC+5:45 (Nepal Time)
- Postal code: 10102
- Website: https://byans-5.gov.np/

Dhaulakot is a village development committee in Darchula District in the Mahakali Zone of western Nepal. At the time of the 1991 Nepal census it had a population of 2094 people living in 337 individual households.

Dhaulakot is 13 kilometers from district headquarters in Khalaga. There are nine wards in the VDC. Main villages of Dhoulakot VDC are Dokat, Naji, Shyaku, Chukpani, Tigram, and Chandakot.

The village of Dhaulakot has temples to the Hindu gods Durga, Mahadev (shiva), Brahma, Bhumiraj (Visnu) and Devi, Hosker, and Patauja. Famous temples and Jattra are Durgamandau, mahadevmandau, Hoskermandau, and Brahmandau. The famous jattra is jageni. Other temples named Harichnd Devta, shrichand devata, mangade bubu, and Ritghade Bubu are also situated at Dhaulakot VDC.
