= Tenzin Tsundue =

Poet, writer and Tibetan refugee and activist

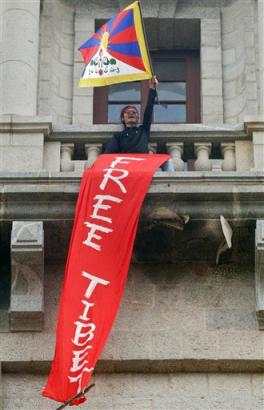
- Tenzin Tsundue protesting across from Chinese Premiere Wen Jiabao's hotel room in Bangalore in 2005.
- Born: 1975 (age 50–51); Manali
- Education: BA & MA English
- Alma mater: Loyola College, Chennai; Mumbai University
- Known for: Activism and writing
- Website: www.tenzintsundue.com

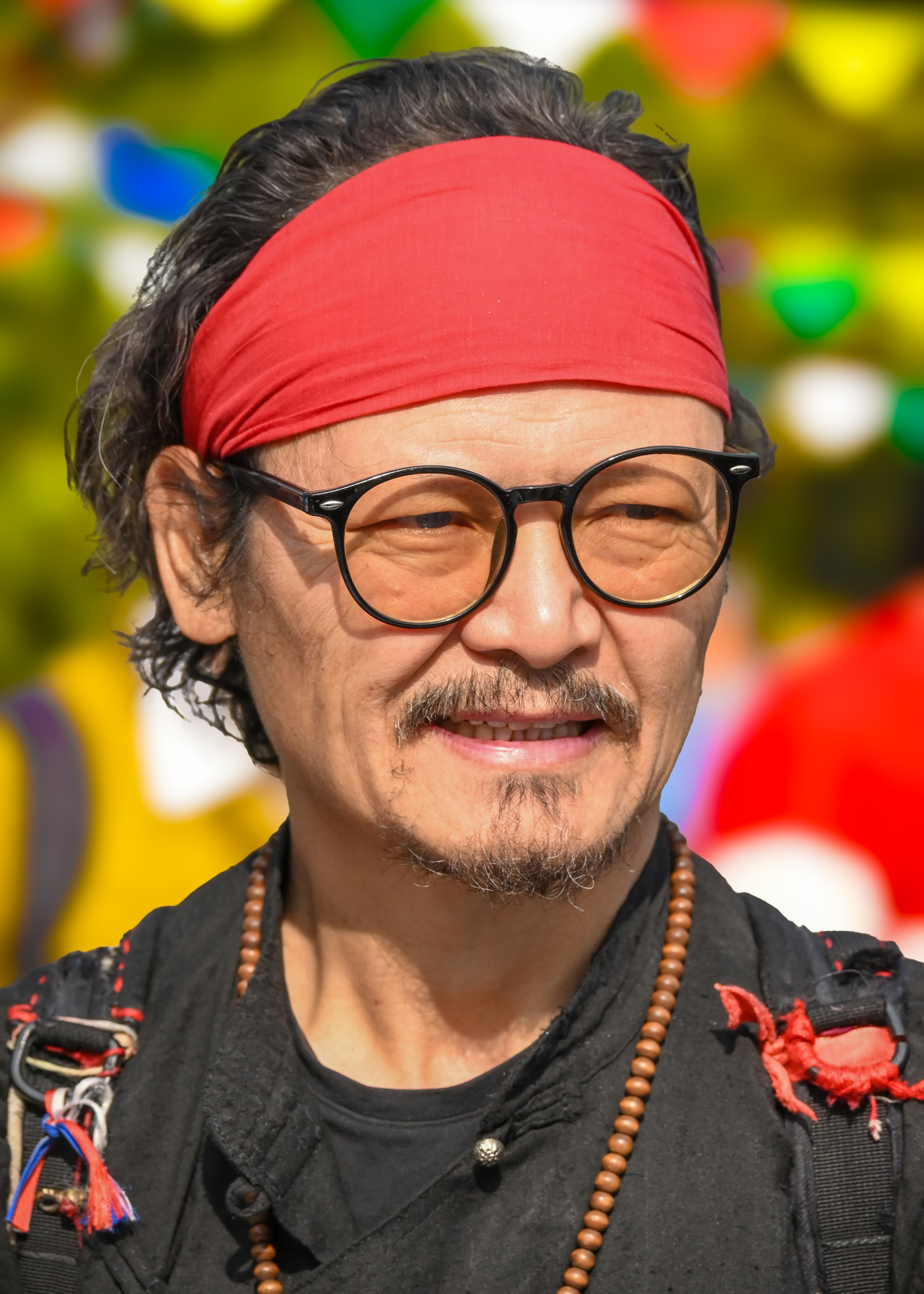
Tenzin Tsundue in 2025

Tenzin Tsundue (born 1975) is a poet, writer and Tibetan refugee and activist. As of 2019 he has been taken into preventive custody, arrested or jailed 16 times for short durations for his activism by Indian authorities, as India does not allow Tibetans to engage in anti-China activities in India. When he was 22, he travelled to Tibet. However, he was arrested and sent back to India, "They told me I was born in India and so I did not belong to Tibet."

He won the first-ever Outlook-Picador Award for Non-Fiction in 2001 for his work "My Kind of Exile". He has published four books which have been translated into several languages: Crossing the Border (1999), Kora (2002), Semshook (2007), and Tsen-göl (2012). Tsundue's writings have also appeared in various publications around the world including the International PEN, Outlook, and The Times of India. In 2002 the Indian edition of the international fashion magazine Elle, named him among India's 50 most stylish people along with the Dalai Lama. Tenzin Tsundue joined Friends of Tibet (India) in 1999 and is the current General Secretary. Tsundue lives in Dharamshala, Himachal Pradesh, North India.

== Background ==
Tsundue's parents were forced to leave their country, Tibet, in 1959 fearing persecution by the People's Republic of China.

When they reached India, they worked as mountain road construction labourers in Masumari, Bir, Kullu, and Manali. "Hundreds of Tibetans who came across into India died in those first few months as they could not bear the heat of summer, and the monsoon caught them in poor health. But the camp lived on and had many shifts along the road. Tsundue was born somewhere along that journey, in a makeshift tent along a roadside". Once when he asked his mother for his date of birth, she replied, 'Who had time to record a child's birth when everyone was tired and hungry?'. He did his schooling from Patlikuhal village, Kullu valley and Dharamshala, and later went on to study English at Loyola College, Chennai and Mumbai University.

== Writing ==
His first book of poems Crossing the Border was published while pursuing a master's degree at Mumbai University. He won the Outlook-Picador Award for Non-Fiction in 2001. His second book, Kora has been translated into French and Malayalam (and was also turned into an award-nominated play called "So Many Socks"). His third book, Semshook, a compilation of essays on the Tibetan freedom movement was published in March 2007. His writings have also appeared in on a regular basis in the Tibetan and Indian media and in international publications.

When I was born
My mother said,
you are a refugee.

— From the poem "Refugee", from the 2002 collection Kora

In 2012, Tsundue published TSENGOL: Stories and Poems of Resistance. And in 2023, he published ནང་༏ Nowhere to Call Home.

== Activism ==
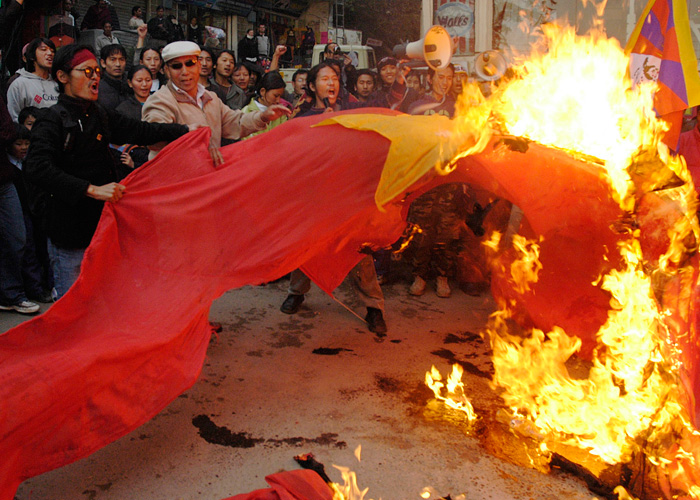
Protest against China in India, 19 April 2008

Tsundue has been involved in Tibet's independence movement since his student days. But he caught international media attention in January 2002 when he climbed the scaffolding outside the hotel where PRC Premier Zhu Rongji was staying in Mumbai; he displayed a banner with the words "Free Tibet: China, Get Out" and a Tibetan flag while shouting pro-Tibetan slogans before being arrested by Indian police.

In April 2005 he repeated a similar one-man protest when PRC Premier Wen Jiabao was visiting the southern city of Bangalore. Standing on the balcony of a 200-foot-high tower at the Indian Institute of Science, he unfurled a red banner that read "Free Tibet" while shouting "Wen Jiabao, you cannot silence us". As a result of his actions, the Indian police ordered a travel ban and Tsundue was ordered not to leave the town of Dharamshala, when the Chinese President Hu Jintao visited India in November 2006.

In 2008, Tsundue announced his intention of taking part in a return march from Dharamshala to Tibet, that was being organized as a part of the "Tibetan People's Uprising Movement", a united effort put together by five major Tibetan NGOs. Tsundue has been wearing a red band around his head since 2002 which he says is the mark of his pledge that he would work for the freedom of his country, and would never take it off until Tibet is free.

Tenzin wrote in the Hindustan Times in 2019 that, "whenever the president of China visits India, the Indian police locates me, no matter where I am and throws me into the nearest central jail". As of 2019, he has been arrested on 16 separate occasions. Before Xi's visit in 2019, he was jailed in Puzhal Central Prison with 13 other Tibetans for 12 days and was the last to be released.

Through his writing and through his advocacy for Tibet, Tenzin Tsundue has become a prominent public intellectual. He has spoken at many literary festivals and international forums including Harvard University and the Geneva Summit for Human Rights and Democracy.

=== Walk a Mile for Tibet ===
Planned route

On 12 February 2021, the day of the Tibetan New Year, Tenzin started a 500 km walk from Dharamshala to New Delhi seeking that India re-visits its "one-China policy". The main aim of the walk "is to highlight the issue of Tibet". He plans to cover the distance in one month, reaching New Delhi on 10 March, the Tibetan Uprising Day.

As he walks to Delhi, he distributes pamphlets along the way and has crowdsourced translations into other regional languages to reach a wider audience. Tenzin says that he is also "informing people about India’s border security" in three languages. He walks holding both the Tibetan flag as well as the Indian tricolour.
