= Huti, Nepal =

Huti हुटी
- Village development committee
- Location in Nepal
- Coordinates: 29.92°N 80.59°E
- Country: Nepal
- Zone: Mahakali Zone
- District: Darchula District

Population (1991)
  - Total: 2,317
- Time zone: UTC+5:45 (Nepal Time)

Huti is a village development committee (VDC) in Darchula District in the Mahakali Zone of western Nepal. At the time of the 1991 Nepal census it had a population of 2317 people living in 417 individual households. It is named after the village of Huti. The Brama Devta temple is located there at Huti-2 and is visited by many pilgrims.
