= Rapla, Nepal =

Village Development Committee in Mahakali Zone, Nepal

Rapla राल्पा
- Village Development Committee
- Location in Nepal
- Coordinates: 29°57′N 80°43′E
- Country: Nepal
- Province: Sudurpashchim Province
- District: Darchula District

Population (1991)
  - Total: 1,112
- Time zone: UTC+5:45 (Nepal Time)

Rapla is a Village Development Committee in Darchula District in the Mahakali Zone of western Nepal. At the time of the 1991 Nepal census it had a population of 1112 people residing in 205 individual households.
