= Darma Valley =

Himalayan valley in Uttarakhand state, India

Bhot Pradesh of Kumaon

Darma valley is a Himalayan valley situated in the Pithoragarh District of Uttarakhand state of India. This valley is located in the eastern part of Uttarakhand at Kumaon division.

The Darma valley is formed by the Darma River (also called Darma Yankti and Darma Ganga). It is situated between two other valleys—Kuthi Yankti valley to the east and Lassar Yankti valley in the west. The Darma valley links with the Lassar valley by Gangachal Dhura and connects with Kuthi valley by Sinla pass and Nama pass.

== Darma River ==
The Darma River starts near Dawe village on the Sino-Indian border and flows southwards. At Tidang it joins the Lassar Yankti and is called Dhauliganga until it joins the river Kali at Tawaghat. Darma valley has rich flora including orchids. A rivulet called Nyuli Yangti that drains Panchachuli east glaciers flows into Dhauli Ganga at Dugtu-Dantu villages. Mandab river joins Dhauli at Sela.

== Habitation ==
The Darma valley is inhabited by some 12 villages with population less than 1000. The villagers have been livestock rearers and traders, cultivating land in the valley with common buckwheat (Fagopyrum esculentum) and potatoes. After the migration of the 1970s, cultivated land has decreased to 25% of former size, allowing biodiversity to return to Darma Valley.

== Major peaks ==
- Panchchuli massif, from 6,334 to 6,904 m (20,781 to 22,651 ft)
- Om Parvat, 6,191 m (20,312 ft)
- Yungtangto, 5,945 m (19,505 ft)

== Mountaineering and trekking ==
Trekking in the Darma valley region was formerly restricted, nowadays trekking without inner line permits is allowed to Panchchuli or Meola Glacier. Additional permits may be required for other areas. Sino-Indian border is still sensitive area.

== See also ==
- Kuthi Valley
