= Kuthi Valley =

Valley in the Himalayas

- Kuti Valley
- Location within Uttarakhand
- Floor elevation: 12,300 ft (3,700 m)
- Length: 30 km (19 mi)

Geography
- Country: India
- State: Uttarakhand
- Region: Kumaon
- District: Pithoragarh
- Coordinates: 30.31°N 80.76°E
- River: Kuthi Yankti
- Interactive map of Kuthi Valley

Kuthi Valley (or Kuti Valley) is a Himalayan valley situated in the Pithoragarh District, Kumaon division of the Uttarakhand state of India. Located in the eastern part of Uttarakhand at an elevation of 12,300 feet (3,700 m), it is the last valley before the border with Tibet. It runs along a northwest–southeast axis, and houses the river Kuthi Yankti, which drains into the Kali River near the village of Gunji.

In May 2020, Nepal laid claim to the northeastern half of the valley, claiming that Kuthi Yanki represented the Kali River and it was meant to be Nepal's border as per the 1816 Sugauli Treaty. It has also published a new map of its territories including the Kuthi Valley. India rejected the Nepalese claims.

This Kuthi valley is mainly populated by Byansis, one of the four Bhotiya communities of Kumaon, with the others being Johar, Darmiya and Chaudansi.

== Kuthi Yankti ==
Bhot Pradesh of Kumaon

Kuthi Yankti is one of the two headwaters of the Kali River, the other being the Kalapani River that flows down from the Lipulekh Pass.

Kuthi Yankti emerges from slopes near Wilsha, below the Limpiya Dhura pass, and passes Lake Jolingkong at an altitude of 4,630 m, to the Kuti village. It flows southeast to merge with the Kalapani River near the Gunji village to form the Kali River (or Sharada River). High Himalayan passes of Mangsha Dhura (5,490 m) and Limpiya Dhura (5,530 m) are situated along the northern border of the Kuthi valley joining it with Tibet. Shin La pass and Nama pass join Darma Valley to Kuthi valley from the south. Jolingkong and Parvati are main alpine lakes.

Sangthang Peak is the highest along the line of peaks forming the northern boundary of the valley with Tibet. Among the peaks forming the southern boundary of the valley, notable peaks are Brammah Parvat (6,321 m), Cheepaydang (6,220 m) and Adi Kailash (5,945 m).

== Byans and Byansis ==
Kuthi Valley is part of the Byans ethnographic region, which comprises Kuthi valley as well as the Kali River valley within its vicinity and the Tinkar Valley in Nepal. The people of this region are called Byansis, who speak a distinctive Byangsi language. There are five Byans villages in the Kuthi valley — Gunji, Nabi, Rongkang, Napalchu and Kuti — with a combined population of 968 people. There are two further villages along the Kali River — Budi and Garbyang — with a population of 1091 people, and two in Nepal's Tinkar Valley (Chhangru and Tinkar). In later times, two new villages were founded in Nepal (Rapla and Sitaula).

Kuti is the last village in the Kuthi valley, at an elevation of 12,300 feet (3,700 m). Garbyang, at the junction of Tinkar river with Kali, is the largest.

The clan names associated with these villages are as follows - Gunjiyal (Gunji), Garbiyal (Garbyang), Budiyal (Budi), Nabiyal (Nabi), Napalchyal (Napalchu), Rongkali (Rongkong), and Kutiyal (Kuti).

=== Cross-border landholding ===
Before the Gorkha conquest of Kumaon in 1791, the Byans patti of Kumaon consisted of the Kuthi Valley as well as the Tinkar Valley. The Sugauli Treaty reached between Britan and Nepal divided the region along the Kali River, placing six villages in India and two in Nepal. It was reported that the zamindars on the Indian side owned land on the Nepal side, and they raised objection to the transfer of Tinkar valley to Nepal. After the transfer, their landownership apparently continued. As late as 1904, taxes were collected by the Nepalese government from Indian landowners. Even in the present time, people from Gunji and Garbyang are said to own pastoral lands on the Nepalese side of the Kali River.

Scholar Vineeta Hoon notes that some of the villagers from the Indian Byans region have summer residences in Dhuligade on the Nepalese side as part their transhumance.

== Nepalese claims ==
The Byans region was originally part of Kumaon and the whole of Kumaon was under rule of Nepal (Gorkha) for 25 years. After the Anglo-Nepalese War and the ensuing Treaty of Sugauli, the Kali River was agreed as the border between Kumaon and Nepal. In 1817, the Nepal Darbar claimed the villages of Tinkar and Chhangru as per the terms of the treaty, and the British Governor General acquiesced. The Nepalese then made the further claim that the Kuthi valley also belonged to them on the grounds that Kuthi Yankti was the main headwater of Kali. This claim was rejected by the British on the grounds that, by tradition and convention, the Kali River is taken to begin at the Kalapani village, where the springs flowing into the river give it the name "Kali".

Henry Strachey, who passed through the confluence in 1846, recorded that the Kuthi Yankti was about a third larger than the eastern branch in both channel size and volume of water and nearly four times as long from source to confluence, yet it was the smaller eastern stream that gave its name to the united river. He attributed that name to the Kalapani springs, which he regarded as unimportant tributaries wrongly reputed to be the river's source. He nevertheless reported that the eastern stream was then the boundary between British and Nepalese territory and that, according to local Bhotias, it had always been so, and considered contemporary maps mistaken in applying the name Kali to the western river and drawing the boundary along it.

The claim to the Kuthi Valley was revived by the Nepalese geographer Buddhi Narayan Shrestha in 1999, who, after studying old maps of the early 19th century, came to the conclusion that "the origin of Mahakali River lies almost 16 kilometres northwest of Kalapani at Limpiyadhura".

In May 2020, the Nepalese government made an official claim to the Kuthi Valley and endorsed a new map of Nepal that showing it as part of Nepal. The Prime Minister K. P. Sharma Oli declared that the country would "reclaim" it. India responded that this was a unilateral act that was "not based on historical facts and evidence".

== See also ==
- Limpiya Dhura
- Gunji, Uttarakhand
- Kalapani territory

== Bibliography ==
- Atkinson, Edwin Thomas (1981) [first published 1884], The Himalayan Gazetteer, Volume 2, Part 2, Cosmo Publications – via archive.org
- Bergmann, Christoph (2016). "Confluent territories and overlapping sovereignties: Britain's nineteenth-century Indian empire in the Kumaon Himalaya". Journal of Historical Geography. 51: 88–98. doi:10.1016/j.jhg.2015.06.015. ISSN 0305-7488.
- Chatterjee, Bishwa B. (January 1976), "The Bhotias of Uttarakhand", India International Centre Quarterly, 3 (1): 3–16, JSTOR 23001864
- Hoon, Vineeta (1996), Living on the Move: Bhotiyas of the Kumaon Himalaya, Sage Publications, ISBN 978-0-8039-9325-9
- Nagano, Yasuhiko; LaPolla, Randy J. (2001), New Research on Zhangzhung and Related Himalayan Languages: Bon Studies 3, National Museum of Ethnology
- Rawat, Ajay Singh (1999), Forest Management in Kumaon Himalaya: Struggle of the Marginalised People, Indus Publishing, ISBN 978-81-7387-101-6
- Strachey, Lieut. H. (September 1848), James Prinsep (ed.), "Narration of a Journey to Cho Lagan, (Rakas Tal), Cho Mapan (Manasarowar), and the valley of Pruang in Gnari, Hundes, in September and October 1846", The Journal of the Asiatic Society of Bengal, 17: 98–120, 127–182, 327–351
- Varma, Uma (1994), Uttar Pradesh State Gazetteer, Govt. of Uttar Pradesh, Dept. of District Gazetteers
- Walton, H. G., ed. (1911), Almora: A Gazetteer, District Gazetteers of the United Provinces of Agra and Oudh, vol. 35, Government Press, United Provinces – via archive.org
