= Tinkar Valley =

Valley in Darchula, Sudurpashchim, Nepal

- Location within Sudurpashchim Province Location within Nepal
- Floor elevation: 3,650 m (11,980 ft)

Geography
- Country: Nepal
- State/Province: Sudurpashchim Province
- District: Darchula
- Coordinates: 30.1355°N 80.9848°E
- River: Tinkar Khola
- Interactive map of Tinkar Valley

Tinkar Valley is a Himalayan valley situated in the Darchula District in the Sudurpashchim Province of Nepal. Located in the northwestern corner of Nepal at an elevation of 3,650 metres (11,980 ft), it borders Tibet region of China in the north and India's Uttarakhand state in the west. It houses the river Tinkar Khola, which drains into the Kali River near the village of Chhangru. Tinkar is the name of the other large village in the valley.

At the top of the Tinkar valley near the Tibet border is the Tinkar Pass (5,258 m), which provides a trading route for the Byansis of the region for the Tibetan trading centre Burang. However, the Tinkaris are said to prefer the Lipulekh Pass across the border in Indian territory due to its higher volume. Nepal has ongoing claims to the Lipulekh Pass, as part of the Kalapani territory dispute.

== Geography ==
Tinkar is in the far-western region of Nepal, in the province of Sudurpashchim Province at the high end of the Great Himalayan range, elevation 3,650 metres (11,980 ft). It is the principal village in the valley of the Tinkar River (Tinkar Khola), which is a tributary of the Mahakali River (or Kali River and Sarda River). Mahakali serves as the western boundary of Nepal with India, beyond which lies the Indian region of Kumaon (part of the Uttarakhand state).

Along the Tinkar Valley, closer to the border, is another large village called Chhangru (or Changru; elevation 9,900 feet (3,000 m)).

Lieutenant Henry Strachey, who visited in 1846, described Chhangru as situated on an elevated terrace at the foot of the mountain Kelirong, within the angle of the Tinkar–Kali confluence, at an elevation of approximately 10,500 feet (3,200 m). He noted that the village was on unsafe ground, gradually descending by landslip into the bed of the Tinkar river. Strachey argued that Changru and Tinkar should not have been left to the Gorkhas, as "the true frontier line was the range of snowy mountains on the East, Tinkar, Nampa, and Api, on the other side of which lies the district of Marma, the northernmost division of Doti, and the inhabitants of which, like those of Dung, next south, are Khasia and not Bhotia."

The region across the border in Kumaon is also populated by Byansi people, with whom the Byansis of the Tinkar Valley have cultural and historical links. A third village called Ghaga, at the confluence of Tinkar and Nampa rivers, is populated by other classes of people.

Upstream along one of the headwaters of the Tinkar Khola is the Tinkar Pass (or "Tinkar Lipu") at the top of the Great Himalayan range, which provides a historical trading route for the Byansis to the Tibetan town of Burang. This pass is however insignificant for the overall economy of Nepal because the far-western region is cut off from the rest of the country by "high impassable mountains and glaciers". Manzard et al. state that the Tinkar Byansis also used to use the Lipulekh Pass because the Tinkar Pass is quite difficult to traverse.

While the general border runs along the Mahakali River, in the upper headwaters above the Kalapani village, it is the watershed of the streams that flow into the river. This was a decision made by the British Indian government in the 19th century. Two significant peaks, P. 6172 and Om Parvat (5590 m), lie on this watershed range, which are popular trekking destinations. Nepal has ongoing claims to the territory beyond the watershed, up to the main headwater stream, which is termed the Kalapani territory.

== History ==
According to the Himalayan Gazetteer, the entire Byans region to the south as well as north of the Mahakali River used to be part of Kumaon. After the unification of Nepal in the 18th century, Nepal expanded northwest and conquered the kingdoms of Kumaon as well as Garhwal. The expansion lasted till 1815. In that year, the Anglo-Nepalese War saw the British general Ochterlony evict the Nepalese from Garhwal and Kumaon across the Mahakali River. After agreeing the Treaty of Sugauli, which made a territorial settlement along the Mahakali River, the Nepalese appealed to the British governor general that they were entitled to the areas to the east (here, southeast) of the Mahakali River. The British conceded the demand, and the Tinkar Valley with its large villages of Chhangru and Tinkar was transferred to Nepal.

The British, however, retained the areas to the northwest of the Mahakali River, including the Kuthi Valley and the Kalapani territory near the headwaters of the Mahakali. When the zamindars of Byans were informed of the decision to transfer Changru and Tinkar, they petitioned Commissioner G. W. Traill in March 1817, stating that the remaining six villages — Budhi, Garbyang, Nabi, Rongkong, Gunji and Kuti — were entirely dependent on the agricultural production of Changru and Tinkar, and that they would be forced to desert their villages or divert their entire trade to the Doti marts in Nepal if the transfer proceeded.. Thus the "parganah [of] Byans" got divided across the two countries.

Since the British operated an open border with Nepal, allowing free movement of people across it, the normal intercourse of the Tinkaris with their fellow Byansis on the Indian side is likely to have continued unhindered. They continued to use the Lipulekh Pass on the Indian side for their commerce with the Tibetans. They also use the road on the Indian side to travel to Khalanga where they spend the winters as part of their transhumance practices. The footbridge at Sitapul near the mouth of Tinkar Khola is used to transit to the Indian side of the border. Likewise the zamindars (landholders) on the Indian side that owned land in Nepal continued to operate such lands.

The Tinkar Pass at the top of the Tinkar Valley is the de facto tri-junction between China, India and Nepal. Article 1 of the China–Nepal border treaty of 1961 states:

The Chinese-Nepalese boundary line starts from the point where the watershed between the Kali River and the Tinkar River meet the watershed between the tributaries of the Mapchu (Karnali) River on the one hand and the Tinkar River on the other hand.

This being the precise geographical description of the location of the Tinkar Pass, the Border Pillar numbered 1 of the China–Nepal border was placed here.

Following the Chinese take-over of Tibet, India and Nepal jointly operated a number of checkposts along the Tibet border starting in 1952. According to Nepalese geographer Buddhi Narayan Shrestha, one of these was at the Tinkar Pass. (Note: Shrestha calls them "Indian posts", but they were in fact Nepalese posts set up with Indian assistance, and had only technical personnel from India. See Sen, N. C. (1969), "Changing Indo-Nepal Relations", China Report, 5 (5): 20–22, doi:10.1177/000944556900500505, S2CID 155924339) In 1969, Nepal asked for the Indian personnel to be withdrawn from the posts, and India did so, with the understanding that Nepal would continue to man the posts. Former Indian Army general Ashok K. Mehta states that none of the posts remained afterwards. Subsequently, India stepped up security and surveillance on the Indian side of the Nepal–India border and also introduced a permit system for the use of Indian roads.

According to The Rising Nepal, a checkpost was established at the Tinkar village around 1972, by an Assistant Sub-Inspector, who was also in charge of patrolling up to Chhangru. The officer claimed to have patrolled up to the Kalapani village with arms once, along the Indian road, while the Indian security kept him under surveillance. He was denied a permit to visit it a second time.

After the 1962 border war between India and China, India closed the Lipulekh Pass at the top of the Kalapani river valley. The Byansis of Kumaon then used the Tinkar Pass for all their trade with Tibet. In 1997, India and China agreed to reopen the Lipulekh pass, and the use of the Tinkar Pass had declined.

== Status ==
According to the Chairperson of the Byas Rural Municipality, Chhangru is the last Nepali village along the Mahakali river heading north. (Note: It is to the south of Gunji where the Kuthi Yankti and Kalapani rivers merge, which India officially regards as the starting point of the Kali river. Even though the Chairperson says that Changru is the last village "not under India's control", that assertion is contracted by the Nepali Times journalists, who reported going up to 600 metres near the Kalapani stream before being stopped by the Indian security.) He states that the roads on the Nepali side are bad and the villagers have to use the Indian roads to get to Chhangru. (Note: Even earlier, Manzardo et al. noted that the Byansis used the road on the Indian side because it was easier to traverse.) They have to obtain permits from the Indian administration for this purpose. He complained of the attitude of the Indian administrators, which he described as "condescending".

There is a walk bridge over the Mahakali River near Chhangru called Sita Pul, which allows passage between India and Nepal. Nepal used to have a customs point at this location, which was abandoned during the conflict period, and has not yet been reinstated. During the conflict period, the area was controlled by the Maoist rebels, who charged "tax" (protection money) on wildlife trafficking through the Tinkar route. Illegal animal products from India are said to have been trafficked, including tiger skins, tiger bones and parts, musk deer pouches and yarsagumba. The Nepali Times journalists estimated that the rebels earned Rs. 35 million annually through such "taxes". Such trafficking is still ongoing as of 2019.

News reports in May 2018 state that the trade with Tibet is "almost nil", and it has been so for the last five or six years. "There is neither road access from the Nepal side to bring goods imported from Tibet nor is there [a] customs office," according to The Kathmandu Post.

Between 2013 and 2020, India laid a (motorable) link road on the Indian side of the river. When it was inaugurated in May 2020, the Nepalese government protested, calling it a "unilateral act".

Bir Bahadur Chand, the police officer that established the Tinkar checkpost, states that the controversies surrounding the Kalapani territory are raised only by the Kathmandu media, and they cause a lot of difficulties for the people of the Tinkar region.

== See also ==
- Kalapani territory
- Kuthi Valley

== Bibliography ==
- Atkinson, Edwin Thomas (1981) [first published 1884], The Himalayan Gazetteer, Volume 2, Part 2, Cosmo Publications – via archive.org
- Atkinson, Edwin Thomas (1981) [first published 1884], The Himalayan Gazetteer, Volume 3, Part 2, Cosmo Publications – via archive.org
- Cowan, Sam (2015), The Indian checkposts, Lipu Lekh, and Kalapani, School of Oriental and African Studies
- Heim, Arnold; Gansser, August (1939), The Throne of the Gods: An account of the first Swiss expedition to the Himalayas (PDF), Macmillan
- Kavic, Lorne J. (1967), India's Quest for Security: Defence Policies, 1947–1965, Berkeley, California: University of California Press
- Manandhar, Mangal Siddhi; Koirala, Hriday Lal (June 2001), "Nepal-India Boundary Issue: River Kali as International Boundary", Tribhuvan University Journal, 23 (1)
- Manzardo, Andrew E.; Dahal, Dilli Ram; Rai, Navin Kumar (1976), "The Byanshi: An ethnographic note on a trading group in far western Nepal" (PDF), INAS Journal, 3 (2), Institute of Nepal and Asian Studies, Tribhuvan University: 84–118, PMID 12311979
- Rose, Leo E. (1971), Nepal – Strategy for Survival, University of California Press, ISBN 978-0-520-01643-9
- Schrader, Heiko (1988), Trading Patterns in the Nepal Himalayas, Bow Historical Books, ISBN 978-3-88156-405-2
- Śreshṭha, Buddhi Nārāyaṇa (2003), Border Management of Nepal, Bhumichitra, ISBN 978-99933-57-42-1, archived from the original on 26 November 2020
- Strachey, Lieut. H. (September 1848), James Prinsep (ed.), "Narration of a Journey to Cho Lagan, (Rakas Tal), Cho Mapan (Manasarowar), and the valley of Pruang in Gnari, Hundes, in September and October 1846", The Journal of the Asiatic Society of Bengal, 17: 98–120, 127–182, 327–351
- Walton, H. G., ed. (1911), Almora: A Gazetteer, District Gazetteers of the United Provinces of Agra and Oudh, vol. 35, Government Press, United Provinces – via archive.org
- Whelpton, John (2005), A History of Nepal, Cambridge University Press, ISBN 978-0-521-80470-7
