= Byangsi language =

West Himalayish language of India and Nepal

Byangsi
- Native to: India, Nepal
- Region: Byans valley (Uttarakhand); Byans (Sudurpashchim Province)
- Native speakers: (3,300 cited 2000 – 2011 census)
- Language family: Sino-Tibetan: Tibeto-Kanauri ?; West Himalayish; Almora; Byangsi

Language codes
- ISO 639-3: bee
- Glottolog: byan1241
- ELP: Byangsi

Byangsi (also called Byansi, Byãsi, Byangkho Lwo, Byanshi, Bhotia, and Byangkhopa) is a West Himalayish language of India and Nepal. Estimates of numbers of speakers vary, but some sources say that the language is spoken by about 1,000-1,500 people, while others estimate as many as 3,300. Byangsi is from a region of high language density, that is to say that there are many languages among few people. It is the most dominant language in this region, although it is not widely known outside of its small hill district and those who speak it have difficulty classifying themselves for central government dealings.

The term Byangsi may also refer to the people that speak the language. There are also three variants of it: Pangjungkho Boli, Kuti, and Yerjungkho Boli. It is considered an endangered language, and it is most likely to be replaced by Hindi if it disappears.

== Geographic distribution ==
Byangsi is part of a group of four small West Himalayish languages spoken in the former "state of Almora", now divided between India's Uttarakhand and far-western Nepal, viz., Rangkas, Darmiya, Chaudangsi and Byangsi.

In Uttarakhand, the Byangsi area extends from Budi (30.1021°N 80.8279°E) in the south to Kuti village (30.3078°N 80.7599°E) in the north. The area is located in Dharchula and Munsiyari tehsils of the Pithoragarh district, and the majority of it is in the Kuthi valley near the Tibet and Nepal borders. Other villages of the area include Nabi, Gunji, Napalchyu, Rongkang, and Garbyang.

In Nepal, Byangsi is traditionally spoken in Chhangru (30.1296°N 80.8835°E) and Tinkar (30.1354°N 80.9848°E) in the Tinkar river valley. The villages are in the Byans municipality in the Darchula District of Sudurpashchim Province. Later, two new villages called Rapla and Sitola were founded by Byangsi speakers to the south of the original area.

=== History ===
The speakers of Byangsi believe themselves to be descended from the Darchula Byangsi people, high-caste Parbatiya, and Tibetans. Until recently, the hill region where the people live was closed to foreign researchers, so very little information has been gathered on the languages of the area.

=== Culture ===
The people who speak Byangsi may be called Byangsi, but the people prefer Bura.

In Nepal's national caste system, which the Nepalese government used to replace the three previous regionally-distinct hierarchies, the mountain peoples to which the Bura belong are placed near the middle. For legal matters with the government, the Bura consider themselves Chetri, specifically, Matwali Chetri, which signifies that they align with Chetri in social customs and structure, but do not follow all of the practices of the Chetri caste.

The Humla region in which the Bura are found is inhabited by three ethnic groups: the Bura, the Nepali Parbatiyas, and the Tibetan speakers, which are all distinct in altitude at which they live, economic activities, and social customs. However, these ethnic boundaries are not rigid, unlike in surrounding areas; ethnic accommodation occurs in which individuals, groups, or even whole villages will change their ethnic affiliation as needed by economic and lifestyle changes. The Bura reside midway along the mountains and make their living by farming the hillsides and recently cleared forest land. The Chetri caste to which the Bura belong is a high caste within the Humla region, though the peoples there are generally very poor. The Matwali Chetri are the result of acculturation of traditional tribal practices to Nepalese society in order to fit a caste model, the Chetri; they share marital, family, and inheritance customs; a ritual calendar; and life crisis rituals with the Chetri, though they, like the rest of the mountain peoples, use cheaper spiritual mediums for their rituals.

Within the Bura ethnic group, the people divide themselves into two classes: jharra ("true") and Tibetan Bura. These classes are divided in that the jharra claim themselves to be descended much more from the Darchula Byansi and high-caste Parbatiya than Tibetan origin and say that they ceased intermarriage with Tibetans long ago, while the Tibetan Bura do allow intermarriage with Tibetans and speak the Tibetan language. There is a low degree of intermarriage between speakers of the different Tibeto-Burman languages of the region.

=== Dialects ===
The variations of Pangjungkho Boli, Kuti, and Yerjungkho Boli are mutually intelligible, with minute differences. Even the languages of Chaudangsi and Darmiya that share a small geographic region are mutually intelligible with Byangsi, as these languages are very closely related and developed in an area where speakers have communicated with each other's villages for years. In fact, all the Tibeto-Burman languages of this region collectively call themselves "Ranglo" and the speakers are called "Rang," and they may be called by outsiders "Shauka" and "Jaba."

=== Sociolinguistic Patterns ===
There is a high degree of bilingualism in Uttarakhand. Hindi is the official language of the state, so all written communication in addition to mainstream media and formal discussions are in Hindi, while Tibeto-Burman languages like Byangsi are now only spoken at home, between close friends and family. Byangsi is not written, although there has been a recent movement among its speakers to create a script for a uniform written language, which may greatly help preserve the language for years to come if successful.

Many Tibeto-Burman languages borrow frequently from more widely-known languages, Byangsi borrows to a lesser degree than its relatives.

== Grammar ==
=== Phonology ===
There are 12 distinct vowel sounds in Byangsii, which are represented: i, i:, ł, ɯ, u, u:, e, o, ε, ɔ, a (ə), and a:. For consonants, there are 36 phonemes, represented as: k, kh, g, ŋ, t5, t5h, d5, n5, t, th, d, dh, n, hn, p, ph, b, bh, m, hm, ts, tsh, dz, c, ch, j, l, hl, r, hr, s, ʃ, h, y, w, r. The consonants bh, dh, and r are borrowed. Syllables in Byangsi may begin with any consonant except for r. Consonant clusters in Byangsi will only occur if the second sound is y or w, which act as semi-vowels.

=== Morphology ===
One can typically sort words in Tibeto-Burman languages into the four categories of verb-adjectives, nouns, pronouns, and numerals, though nouns are often derived from verbs (but hardly ever vice versa). Numerals and pronouns are of the noun-type in terms of syntax and affixation patterns. Byangsi has separate verbs from adjectives and also has adverbs.

==== Nouns ====
Noun stems may be simple or complex. Compound nouns can be formed by putting together multiple morphemes. A prefix or suffix may be added to a word to denote gender of the person or animal in question. To denote plurality, the suffix -maŋ may be used, or to specifically show the quantity of two, the suffix -khan or the prefix nis (from nəʃɛ) may be used.

Nouns may take one of four cases, those being nominative, agentive/instrumental, dative, or genitive. Those which are not the nominative take suffixes to indicate case.

==== Pronouns ====
Personal pronouns differentiate between first, second, and third person in addition to singularity, duality, or plurality, with the dual being shown by adding the suffix -ʃi to the plural pronoun.

	Singular	Dual	Plural
First person	je	inʃi	in
Second person	gan	ganiʃi	gani
Third person	uo	uniʃi	unʃi

Demonstrative pronouns in Byangsi will differentiate based on number, distance, elevation relative to speaker, and whether an object is visible.

There is also a set of interrogative pronouns:

Byangsi	English
khà	what
una	who
ulaŋ	when
wà	where
ham	how
hoŋ	why

The emphatic pronoun "api" may have been borrowed from Hindi or Kumaoni. It only has one form. There is also only one relative pronoun, "dzai," which is always used with "api."

==== Adjectives ====
Adjectives precede the nouns they modify and do not change form. They can also be used as substantives.

==== Adverbs ====
Adverbs may specify the time, place, or manner of an action and precede the verb which they modify.

==== Verbs ====
There are both simple and compound verbs in Byangsi, with the simple verbs having monosyllabic roots. Verbs may be treated as typically transitive or intransitive, and in order to change the meaning, they may take on a suffix based on what the typical role of the verb is.

Byangsi, like many Tibeto-Burman languages, amply uses aspectivizers, which are auxiliaries added to a verb directly to its stem to slightly change its meaning to something closely related. The change between a transitive and intransitive verb may be considered an aspectivizer. The aspectivizer itself cannot stand alone, although a verb without one may; in fact, some verbs will not take an aspectivizer.

A verb will change form based on tense, aspect, mood, person, and number. Moods include imperative/prohibitive, indicative, infinitive, and subjunctive. Infinitives are shown by adding the suffix -mo (sometimes pronounced -mɔ) to the verb stem.

=== Syntax ===
Byangsi places the object before the verb. The verb comes at the end of a sentence, and typically, the subject comes before the object.

Relationships of words in Tibeto-Burman languages are determined both by positioning in a sentence and morphemes, which may be either prefixes or suffixes. Morphemes may be used to reinforce the roles of words or to indicate their roles if they are not in the "standard" order and seem to be a relatively recent addition to Tibeto-Burman languages.

=== Kinship Terminology ===
Byangsi's kinship terminology is a symmetrical prescriptive type, meaning that the same terms may be used for relatives on both sides of the family tree.

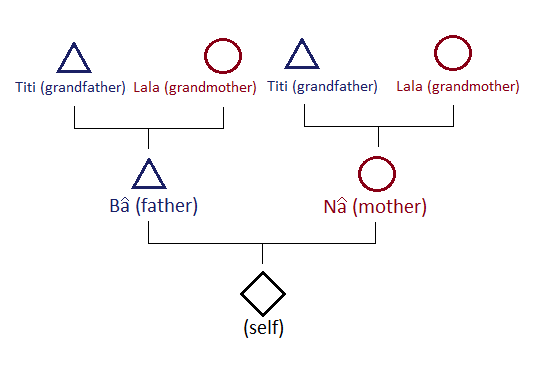
Symmetrical terminology used in Byangsi

The family tree is not exactly symmetrical in terminology, but some terms mean types of relatives that are thought of as similar in the culture. An example of a perfectly symmetrical relationship is that the terms titi and lala each refer to the father's parents and mother's parents. However, many complex relationships have specific names in Byangsi that may be shared. The term chînî is used for one's spouse's mother as well as one's father's sister and mother's brother's wife. This relationship could be thought of as being similar to an aunt, although chînî is not used for one's mother's sisters. Likewise, the term thângmi is used for one's spouse's father, one's mother's brother, and one's father's sister's husband, but not one's father's brothers.

== Numeral System ==
Byangsi uses a non-base 10 decimal numeral system. It uses prefixes as multipliers.

Arabic Numeral	Byangsi Word	Arabic Numeral	Byangsi Word
1	tiɡɛ	13	cɛsɯm
2	naʃɛ	20	nasa: [nassa:]
3	sɯm	21	nasa: tiɡɛ
4	pi	30	nasa: cì
5	nai	40	pisà
6	tugu	50	pisa: cì
7	niʃɛ	60	tuksa:
8	jɛdɛ	70	tuksa: cì
9	ɡui	80	jatsha
10	cì	90	jatsha cì
11	cɛthe	100	rà / sai
12	cɛnye	1000	haja:r

Table modified from Chan.

Note that sai and haja:r are borrowed from Indo-Aryan.

Multiplicative words are formed by reduplicating the main word, for example, using pipi to mean four times (from pi), or the suffix -tsu, such as pitsu to achieve the same meaning.

Fractions are expressed by local measurements except for one word, "phyε," which means "half" and is never modified.

== Vocabulary ==
Select assorted vocabulary (not comprehensive):

Byangsi word	English translation
ɔ	yes
lairi	all
yin	be
ŋɔ	face
taŋde	alive
yaddε	bad
semo	bear
wa nayaŋ	bee
le	fruit
hnimmo	smell
labu	butter
khu	family
sàg	breath
dza:mo	eat
tuŋmo	drink
sapaŋ	earth
sa:tso	empty
hicimo	die
khat	cold
rɔ	hungry
itta	just now
bhak	sound
chò	spoon
gal	yak

== Bibliography ==
- Benedict, Paul K. (1972), Matisoff, James A. (ed.), Sino-Tibetan: A Conspectus, CUP Archive
