= Char Dham Highway =

Proposed two-lane highway in Uttarakhand, India

Char Dham National Highway

Route information
- Maintained by National Highways Authority of India
- Length: 889 km (552 mi)

Major junctions
- North end: Mana
- South end: Rishikesh

Location
- Country: India
- States: Uttarakhand
- Major cities: Rishikesh, Dharasu, Yamunotri, Gangotri, Rudraprayag, Gaurikund, Kedarnath, Joshimath, Badrinath, Mana

Highway system
- National Highways

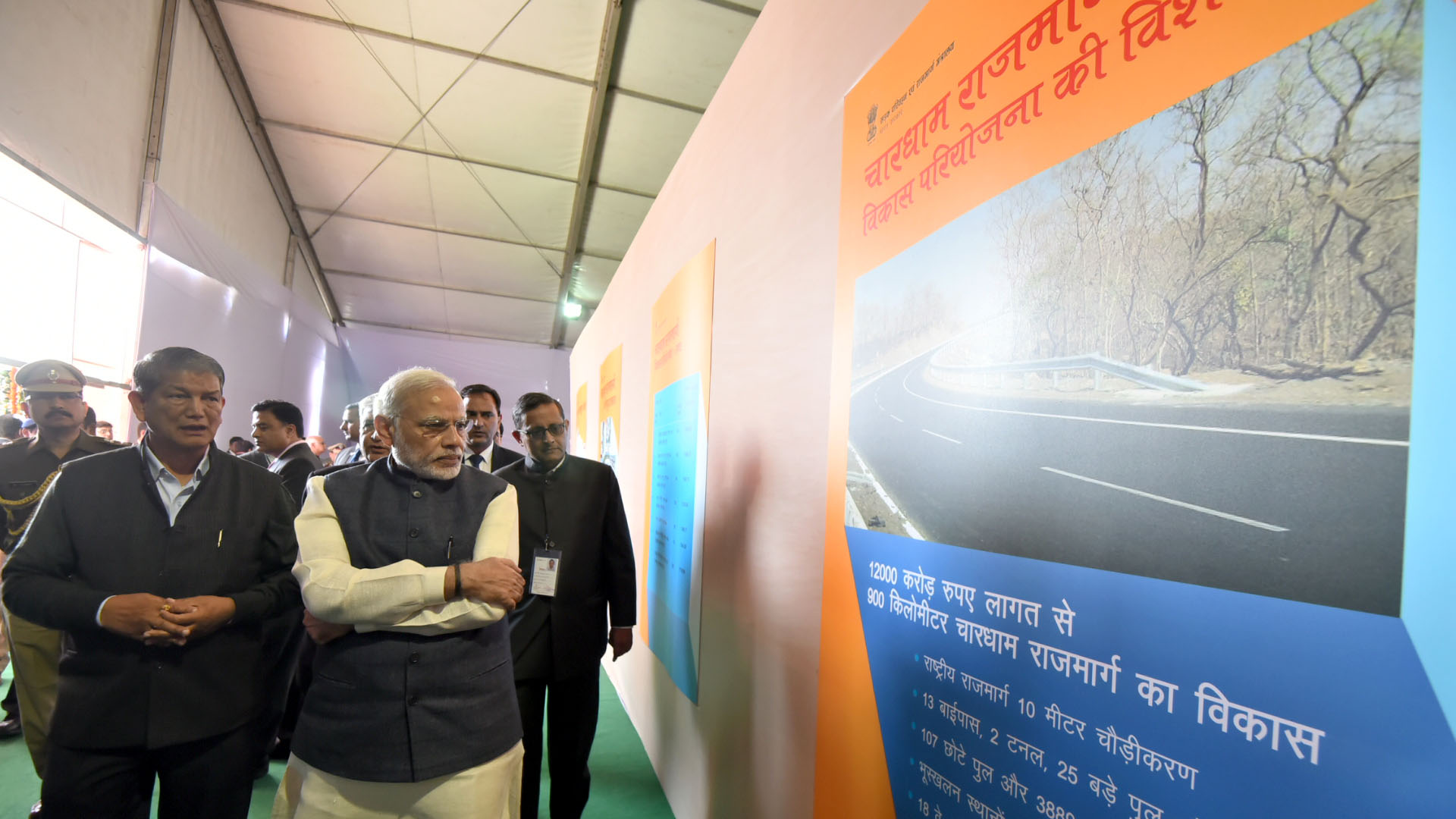
Prime Minister Narendra Modi visiting an exhibition during the launch of the Char Dham Rajmarg Vikas Pariyojana, at Dehradun, Uttarakhand

Char Dham National Highway, is an under construction two-lane (in each direction) 889 km long National Highway with a minimum width of 10 metres in the Indian state of Uttarakhand under Char Dham Pariyojana. The under construction highway will complement the under-construction Char Dham Railway by connecting the four holy places in Uttarakhand states namely Badrinath, Kedarnath, Gangotri and Yamunotri. The project includes 889 km national highways which will connect the whole of Uttarakhand state. It will connect Delhi–Dehradun Expressway on its southern end to India-China Border Roads on its northern ends.

== Development ==
The total cost of ₹12,000 crores and the foundation stone of the project was laid by Prime Minister Narendra Modi on 27 December 2016 at Parade Ground in Dehradun. The highway will be called Char Dham Mahamarg (Char Dham Highway) and the highway construction project will be called as Char Dham Mahamarg Vikas Pariyojana (Char Dham Highway Development Project) and is made to improve the connectivity to the Chota Char Dham nestled in the Himalayas. Road will include several long bridges and tunnels to eliminate accident and slide prone areas. Indian Railways and National Highways Authority of India have been directed, by the Cabinet Secretary of India, to ensure that rail and road highway routes are integrated on this circuit.

== Route alignment ==
Originating from Rishikesh, Char Dham highway network will have 5 distinct routes,

From west to east and south to north:

- Rishikesh–Yamunotri
  - Rishikesh
  - Dharasu, NH 94, 144 km from Rishikesh
  - Yamunotri, NH 94, 95 km from Dharasu. State buses go up to Hanuman Chatti (14 km from Yamunotri), taxis go all the way to Yamunotri, and lodging is available at dharamshalas and ashrams at Yamunotri.
- Rishikesh–Gangotri (same route as previous one till Dharasu). This will take the railway and Char Dham road highway at Gangotri close to the border area of Nelang Valley .
  - Rishikesh
  - Dharasu, NH 94, 144 km from Rishikesh
  - Gangotri, NH 108, 124 km from Dharasu. Road transport goes up to Gangotri, but the actual source of Ganga is at Gomukh glacier which is another 18+ km trail and requires a minimum of two days.
- Rishikesh–Kedarnath
  - Rishikesh
  - Rudraprayag, NH 58, 140 km from Rishikesh
  - Gaurikund (trek 12.6 km to Kedarnath on foot, by pony or helicopter ride), NH 109, 76 km from Rudraprayag, Road transport goes up to Gaurikund.
- Rishikesh–Badrinath (same route are previous one till Rudraprayag). This will take the railway and Char Dham road highway at Badrinath closer to the area of Barahoti .
  - Rishikesh
  - Rudraprayag, NH 58, 140 km from Rishikesh
  - Joshimath
  - Mana (trek to Badrinath), NH 58, 140 km from Rudraprayag, motorable all the way to Badrinath, Tapt Kund ‘hot springs’ is just before the Badrinath Temple.
- Pithoragagh-Lipulekh Pass Highway (PLPH), nearly 350 km long route to Lipulekh Pass on India-Tibet border for Kailas-Manasarovar yatra.
  - Budi-Garbyang tunnel, 6 km long, Rs2000 cr 2-lane tunnel planned for swifter all-weather Kailash-Mansarovar yatra.
  - a spur from Nabidhang runs along a glaciated river to Om Parvat.
  - Gunji-Lampiya Dhura Pass Road (GLDPR) runs through Kuti from Gunji, via Adi Kailash, to Lampiya Dhura Pass (Limpiyadhura Pass on India-Tibet border).

== Facilities ==
The project will have bypasses, bridges, viaducts, pit stops, parking, helipads and helicopter emergency response services, etc. along the way.

== Status updates ==
- Dec 2016: Prime Minister Narendra Modi laid the foundation stone in December 2016.
- July 2023: 75% (601 km out of 825 km) of Char Dham Yatra highways complete.

== See also ==
- Char Dham Railway
