= Adi Kailash =

Mountain in Uttarakhand, India

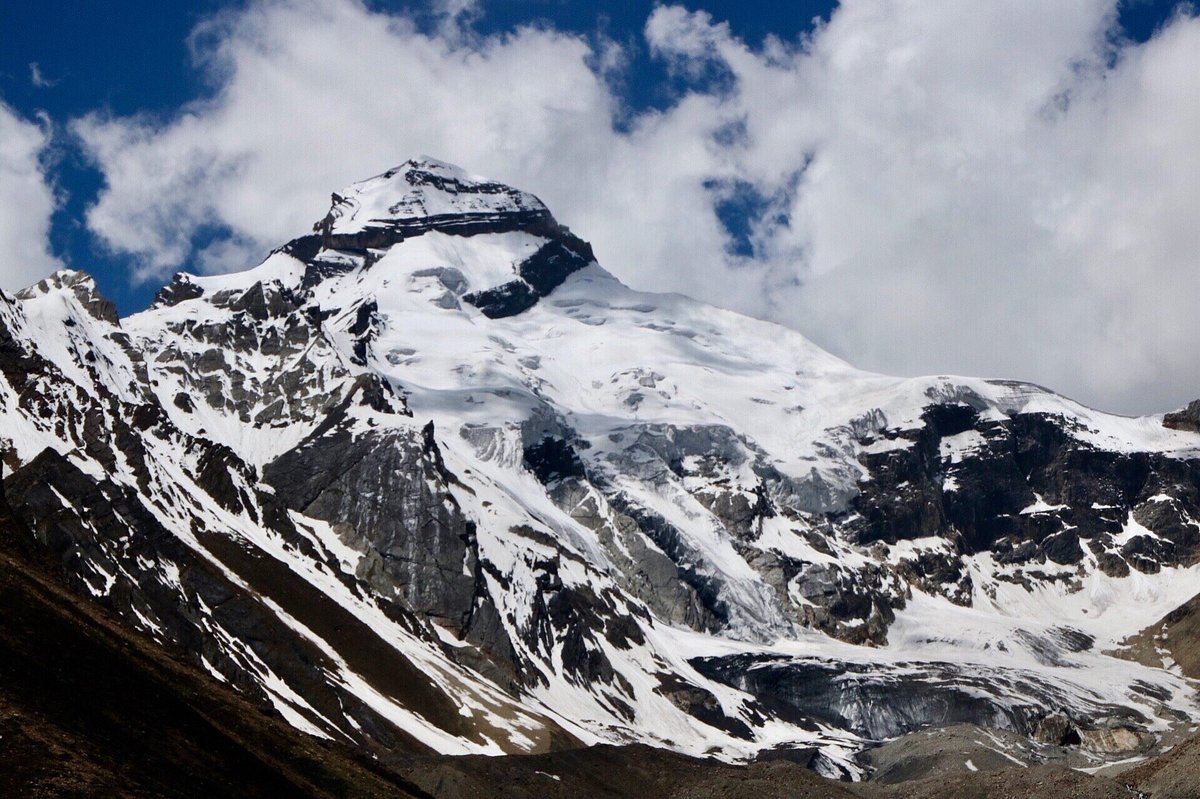

Highest point
- Elevation: 5,945 m (19,505 ft)
- Coordinates: 30°19′09″N 80°37′57″E

Geography
- Location within India Location within Uttarakhand
- Location: Pithoragarh district, Dharchula, India
- Parent range: Himalayas

Climbing
- First ascent: 8 October 2004
- Easiest route: Southwest ridge: glacier/snow/rock climb (PD+/AD-)

Adi Kailash (Kumaoni: आदि कैलाश), also known as Shiva Kailash, Chota Kailash, Baba Kailash or Jonglingkong Peak, is a mountain located in the Himalayan mountain range in the Pithoragarh district of Uttarakhand, India. It is the second most important peak among the group of five separate peaks in Himalayas in separate locations collectively known as the Panch Kailash or "Five Kailashas", others being Mount Kailash in the first place, Shikhar Kailash (Shrikhand Mahadev Kailash) in the third, Kinnaur Kailash in the fourth and Manimahesh Kailash in the fifth place in terms of importance. Gauri Kund (Jolingkong Lake) and Parvati Tal glacial lakes are at the base of the Adi Parvat.

Adi Kailash and Limpiyadhura Pass (further northwest of Adi Kailash) are both located northwest of Gunji. The Lipulekh Pass, Old Lipulekh Peak, and Om Parvat (southwest of Lipulekh Pass) are located northeast of Gunji. Adi Kailash base camp, near the Hindu Shiva temple on the banks of sacred Jolingkong Lake (Gauri Kund), is located 17 km northwest of Kuthi (Kuti) village in Kuthi Yankti Valley (Kuthi or Kuti Valley). The Adi Kailash Yatra Circuit route-1 via Gunji, the eastern-southeastern route, is reached by the Pithoragagh-Lipulekh Pass Highway (PLPH) and its Gunji-Lampiya Dhura Pass Road (GLDPR) paved motorable spur via Kuthi Yankti Valley from Gunji to Adi Kailash. The permits for this route are issued at Dharchula and medical check-up is conducted there. The homestay accommodation is available in the villages along the route in Gunji, Napalachchu, Nabhi, Juli Kong and Kuti. The Adi Kailash Yatra Circuit route-2 via Darma Valley, the western-southwestern route, begins by going up the Darma Valley and then crossing the Sin La pass south of Brahma Parvat to go to Kuthi Yankti Valley to Jolingkong Lake Base Camp. Many travellers who take the route-2, after the Adi Kailash darshan, choose to traverse the route-1 in reverse direction till Gunji where they can join the Om Parvat and Mount Kailash-Lake Manasarovar Tibetan pilgrimage route along the Sharda River (Kali River).

== Location ==
Adi Kailash is often confused with the nearby Om Parvat. Om Parvat can be viewed in route to the Kailash Manasarovar Yatra from the last camp below Lipulekh Pass at Nabhidhang India-China border post protected by the Indo-Tibetan Border Police also has Public Works Department guest house on the Indian side. Many trekkers to Adi Kailash often make a diversion to view Om Parvat. Om Parvat is located near Nabhi Dhang camp on Mount Kailash-Lake Manasarovar yatra route.

== First Ascent ==
From 19 Sept to 14 Oct 2002 the first attempt, which was abandoned 200 m (660 ft) short of the summit because of very loose snow and rock conditions, was made by an Indo-Aussie-British-Scottish team including Martin Moran, T. Rankin, M. Singh, S. Ward, A. Williams and R. Ausden. The climbers promised not to ascend the final 10 metres (30 ft) out of respect for the peak's holy status.

On 8 October 2004, the first successful ascent of Adi Kailash was by the British-Scottish-American team composed of Tim Woodward, Jack Pearse, Andy Perkins (UK); Jason Hubert, Martin Welch, Diarmid Hearns, Amanda George (Scotland); and Paul Zuchowski (USA), who did not ascend the final few metres out of respect for the sacred nature of the summit.

== Adi Kailash Yatra Circuit ==
The Adi Kailash Yatra Circuit begins by going up the Darma Valley and then going to Kuthi Yankti Valley (India) via the Sin La pass to join the Mount Kailash-Lake Manasarovar Tibetan pilgrimage route down the Sharda River. Motoroable Route to Adi Kailash is via Gunji. While approaching Gunji from Dharcula and the rest of India, the route along the western bank of Sharda River (also called Mahakali River) at Gunji forks into two separate motorable routes, one goes north to Kailash-Mansarovar and another to the west to Adi Kailash. In July 2020, India also opened a newly constructed road in this area from Gunji to Limpiyadhura Pass (Lampiya Dhura Pass on India-China border) which has reduced the trek time to Adi Kailash to two hours. Earlier in May 2020, India had inaugurated a new 80 km long road from Dharchula via Gunji to Lipulekh Pass on India-China border [under geostrategic India-China Border Roads project] to the Kailash-Manasarovar.

== Panch Kailash or Five Kailash ==
"Panch Kailash", literally - the Five Kailashas, is the collective name for the group of five sacred mountain peaks in Hinduism, which are at separate locations in Himalayas; each of which has Kailash in its name. The most sacred of all is the Mount Kailash in Tibet. The second most sacred is the Adi Kailash in Uttarakhand, India. While, the rest - Shrikhand Mahadev Kailash (aka Shikhar Kailash), Kinnaur Kailash (aka Kinner Kailash), and Manimahesh Kailash (aka Chamba Kailash) are all in the state of Himachal Pradesh of India. There is another sixth mountain, not part of Panch Kailash, called Sri Kailash.

== See also ==
- Char Dham
- Hindu pilgrimage sites in India
- Kalapani territory
- Yatra
- Om Parvat
- Om beach
- Kinnaur Kailash, among Panch Kailash
- Manimahesh Kailash, among Panch Kailash
- Shrikhand Kailash, among Panch Kailash
- Mount Kailash, among Panch Kailash
- Sri Kailash, not among Panch Kailash
