= Shrikhand Mahadev =

Religious mountain track in Kullu, Himachal Pradesh, India

Coordinates: 31.6593632°N 77.6440715°E

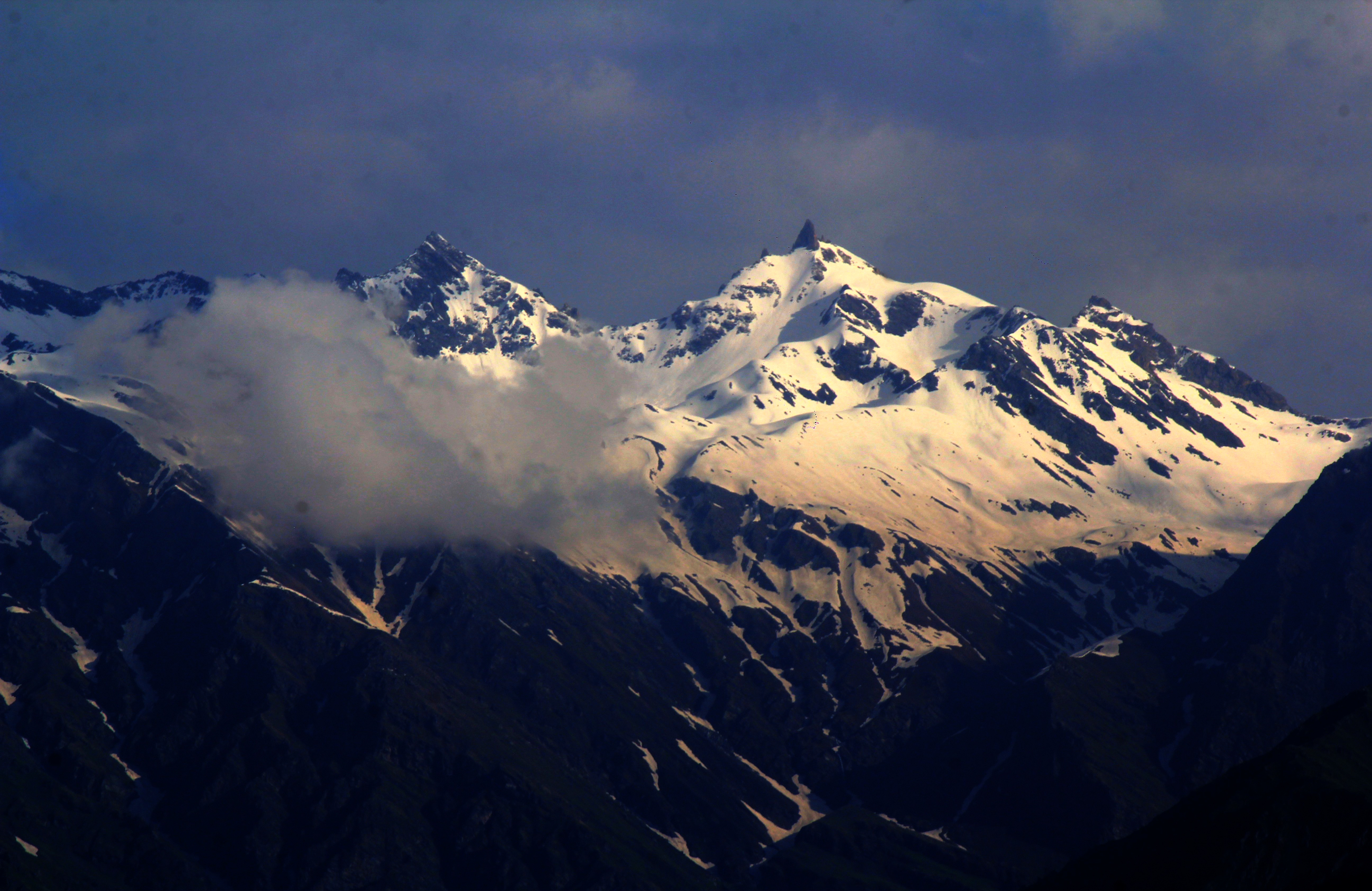
The peaks of Shrikhand Mahadev

Shrikhand Mahadev Kailash, also called Shikhar Kailash, is a Hindu pilgrimage site in Nirmand sub-division of Kullu, Himachal Pradesh, India, considered to be an abode of Lord Shiva and his wife Goddess Parvati. It is considered to be one of the toughest treks in India. It is the third most important peak among the group of five separate peaks in Himalayas in separate locations collectively known as the Panch Kailash or "Five Kailashas", other being Mount Kailash in first place, Adi Kailash in second, Kinnaur Kailash in fourth and Manimahesh Kailash in fifth place in terms of importance. The 75 feet Shivalingam at the top of the Shrikhand Mahadev mountain is at a height of 18,570 feet.

== Pilgrimage ==
There are various spots that pilgrims take before reaching Jaon, some of them include (in decreasing order of their distance from the peak), Shimla, Nirmand, Jaon. It is a 32 km (from one side) trek from base village Jaon to the Shrikhand top which is approximately 18,570 ft above the sea level. From Jaon the journey begins, and after 3 km of walking reaches Singhaad, the first Base camp where Langar (free meal for the pilgrims) is available alongside some paid food services. After that there is a 12 km straight uphill stretch to Thaachru, also known as 'Dandi-Dhaar' (roughly translating to Stick-Height), because of the stretch being a very steep slope with an elevation angle of approximately 70 degrees. One gets to see lush green Deodar trees and streams while heading towards Thaachru. After the long 15 km trek, there is a recommended halt with tent lodging in Thaachru.

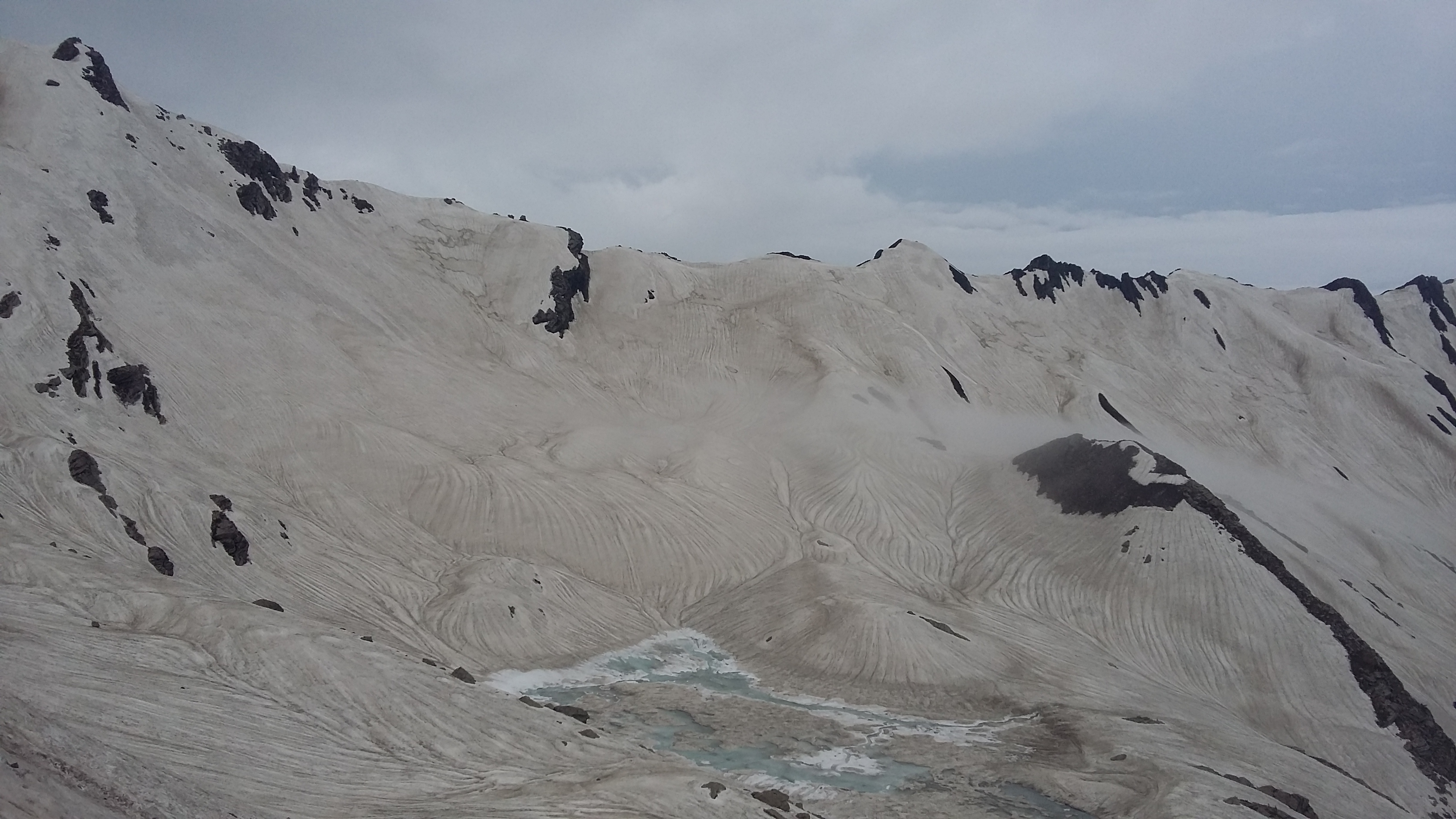
Nain Sarowar

Thaachru is another base camp, surrounded by lush green Deodar trees and streams, where meals and tents are available. The journey begins with a 3 km uphill trek to Kali Ghati, which is supposed to be abode of the Goddess Kali. The Shiva-Linga can be seen from this point, given the weather is clear. From Kali Ghati, there is a 1 km downhill stretch towards Bheem Talai. Departing from Bheem Talai, there is a 3 km stretch to Kunsa Valley, a green valley with Himalayan flowers surrounding it. After another 3 km stretch from here, there is the next base camp, Bheem Dawaar, having all the usual services. Just 2 km ahead is another base camp, Parvati Bagh (Parvati's garden), supposedly a garden planted by Hindu Goddess Parvati. The garden has flowers like Brahma Kamal, also known as Saussurea obvallata, which supposedly was used by the Hindu deity Shiva to plant an elephant's head on Ganesha, the god of New Beginnings. 2 km from there, is the next spot Nain Saravor (meaning, Eye's Lake), and revered to be a holy lake, and numerous people reporting physical healing of old diseases, and impairments after dipping in the lake. After this, is the final stretch of approximately 3 km to the peak, through rocky terrains, to the peak, where the lingam is situated. The peak, alongside having Shiva's lingam also has a mountain for Lord Kartikeya, behind the main Shiva mountain.

Another trek to Shrikhand Mahadev is from Banjar region, however this trek is more about wildlife.

== Gallery ==
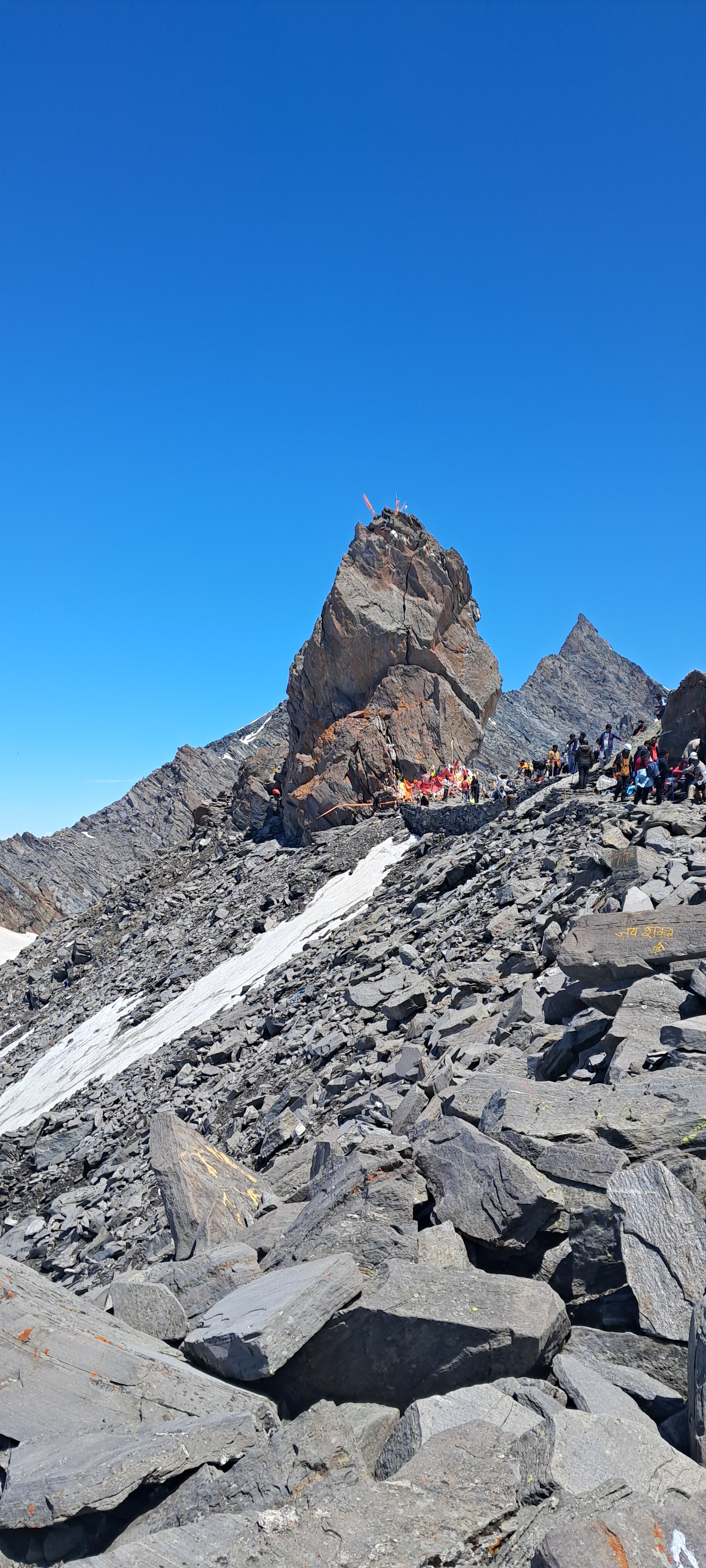
Shrikhand Mahadev site in Kullu Himachal Pradesh

Toughest Shrikand Mahadev trek

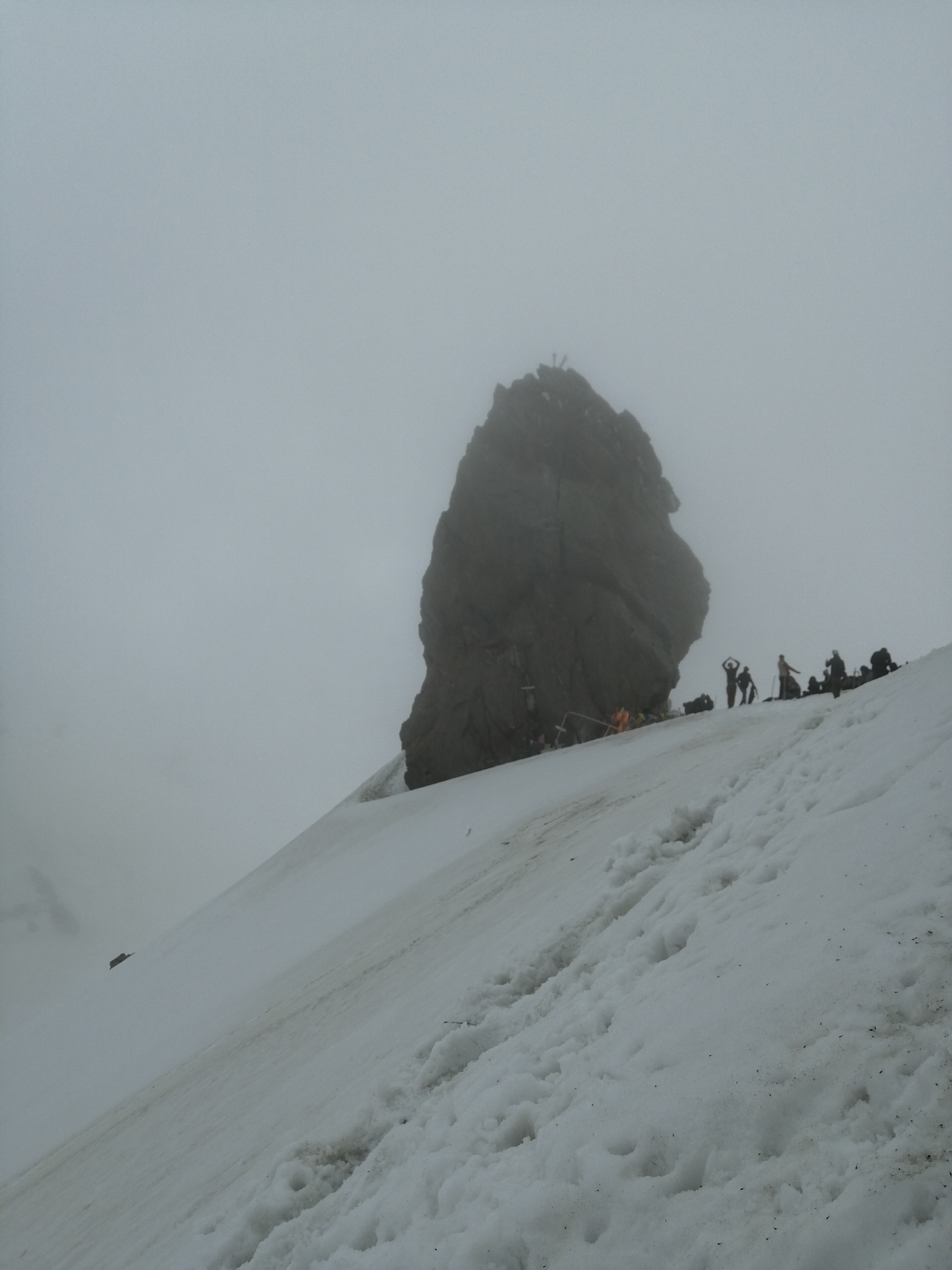
The Shivalingam at the top.

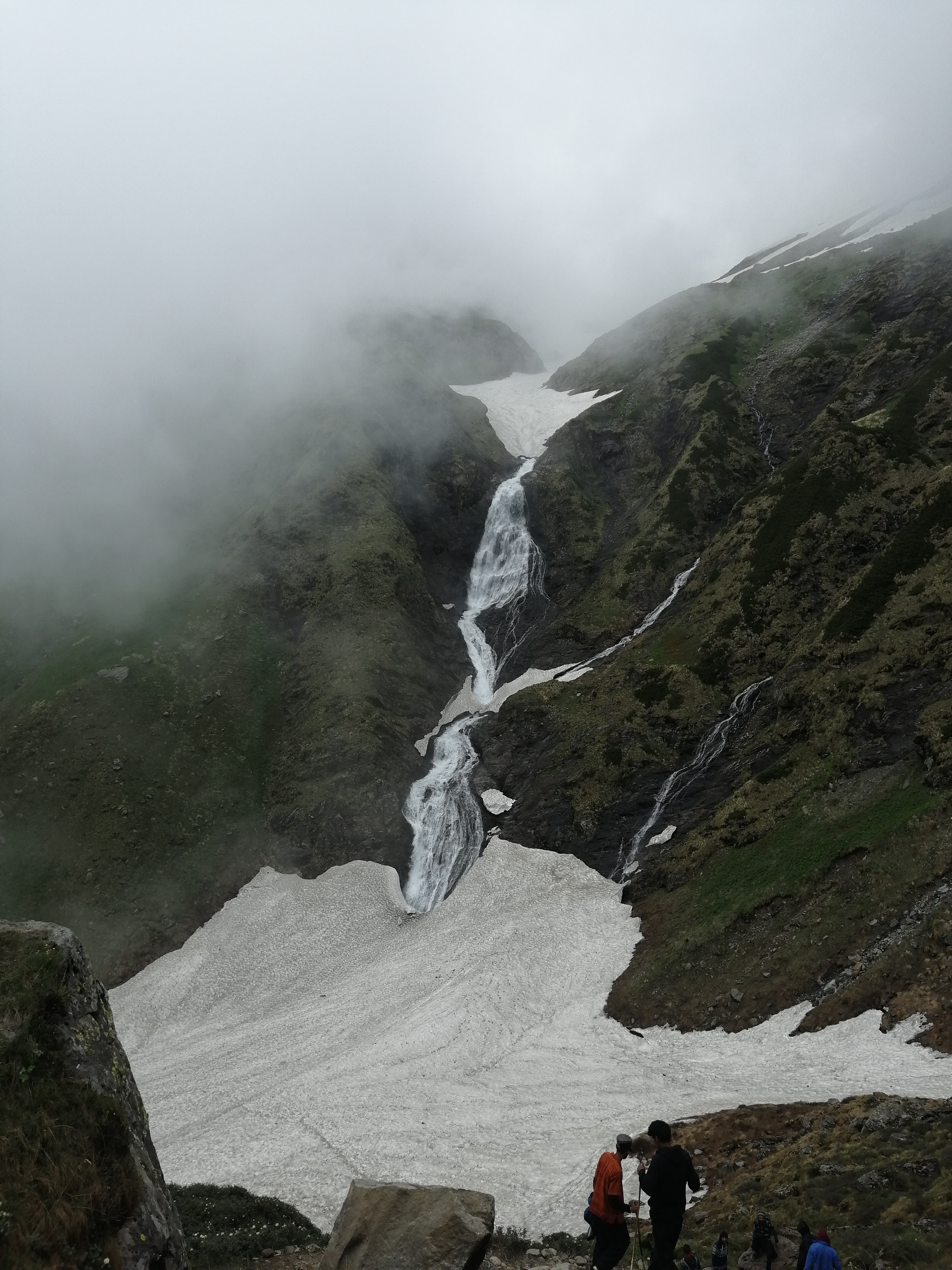
Parvati River near Bhim Dwar

== See also ==
- Panch Kailash, lit. "Five Kailashas" referring to five scared mountains named Kailash
  - Mount Kailash, among Panch Kailash
  - Adi Kailash, among Panch Kailash
  - Kinnaur Kailash, among Panch Kailash
  - Manimahesh Kailash, among Panch Kailash
- Sri Kailash, not among Panch Kailash
- Om Parvat
- Om beach
