= Gunji =

Gunji may refer to:

== Places ==
- Gunji, Karnataka, India
- Gunji, Uttarakhand, India

== People ==
- Gunji Koizumi (1885–1965), a Japanese master of judo
- Riko Gunji (born 2002), Japanese badminton player
- Taito Gunji (born 1999), a Japanese kickboxer
