= Kalapani territory =

Territory in dispute

- Territory in dispute
- Kalapani territory is the southern half of the Kalapani river basin Kalapani territory (Sudurpashchim Province)
- Coordinates: 30.214°N 80.984°E
- Country: India; Disputed by Nepal
- Established: c. 1865
- Founder: British Raj

Government
  - Type: Border security
  - Body: Indo-Tibetan Border Police

Area
  - Total: 35 km^{2} (14 sq mi)
- Highest elevation: 6,180 m (20,280 ft)
- Lowest elevation: 3,650 m (11,980 ft)

Population
  - Total: 50–100
- Time zone: UTC+5:30

The Kalapani territory is an area under Indian administration as part of Pithoragarh district in the Kumaon Division of the Uttarakhand state, but it is also claimed by Nepal since 1997. According to Nepal's claim, it lies in Darchula district, Sudurpashchim Province. The territory represents part of the basin of the Kalapani river, one of the headwaters of the Kali River in the Himalayas at an altitude of 3600–5200 meters. The valley of Kalapani, with the Lipulekh Pass at the top, forms the Indian route to Kailash–Manasarovar, an ancient pilgrimage site. It is also the traditional trading route to Tibet for the Bhotiyas of Kumaon and the Tinkar valley of Nepal.

The Kali River forms the boundary between India and Nepal in this region. However, India states that the headwaters of the river are not included in the boundary. Here the border runs along the watershed. This is a position dating back to British India c. 1865.

Nepal has another pass, the Tinkar Pass (or "Tinkar Lipu"), close to the area. (Note: According to Nepalese analyst, Buddhi Narayana Shrestha, the distance between the two passes is 3.84 km.) After India closed the Lipulekh Pass in the aftermath of the 1962 Sino-Indian War, much of the Bhotiya trade used to pass through the Tinkar Pass. The Nepalese protests regarding the Kalapani territory started in 1997, after India and China agreed to reopen the Lipulekh pass. Since that time, Nepalese maps have shown the area up to the Kalapani river, measuring 35 square kilometres, as part of Nepal's Darchula District.

A joint technical committee of Indian and Nepalese officials have been discussing the issue since 1998, along with other border issues. But the matter has not yet been resolved.

On 20 May 2020, Nepal released a new map of its own territory that expanded its claim an additional 335 square kilometres up to the Kuthi Yankti river, including Kalapani, Lipulekh and Limpiyadhura. It did not explain why a new claim arose.

== Geography and tradition ==
According to the Almora District Gazetteer (1911), the Kalapani (literally "dark water") is a collection of mountain springs near Kalapani village. The springs begin at the north-eastern declivity of a peak known as Byans-Rikhi at an elevation of 14,220 feet (4,330 m), and they descent around 2,000 feet (600 m) into the Kalapani River in the valley. The Kalapani is formed from two streams: the Lipu Gad originating from the western end of the Lipulekh Pass, and the Tera Gad from the western declivity of the Kuntas peak. Modern maps show two further streams joining from the southeast, which begin at Om Parvat and Point 6172 respectively. The latter of these, called Pankha Gad, joins the river very near Kalapani village. (Note: Some survey maps of Nepal transpose the names of the Pankha Gad and Lilinti Gad, the two tributaries that join the Kalapani from the southeast.)

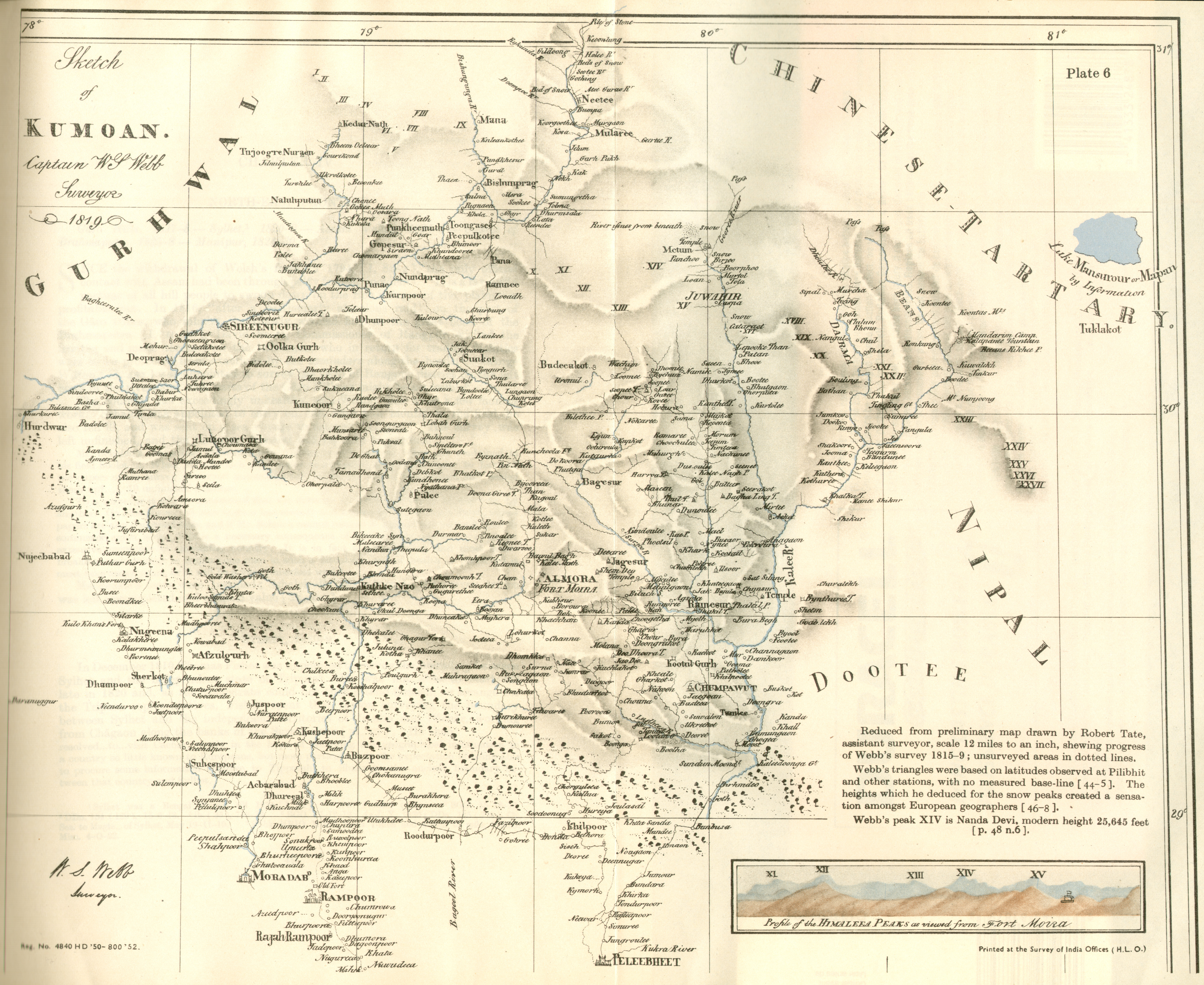
Survey map of Kumaon (Surveyor: W. J. Webb, Draughtsman: Robert Tate, 1819) as published in the Historical Records of the Survey of India, 1954. (Note: Col. William J. Webb surveyed the Kumaon area between 1815–1821. By May 1816, "he had surveyed to the sources of the Kali and was working along the north border". Webb did not assign names to the three large tributaries that join the Kali River in Kumaon, even though he labelled their valleys as Byans, Darma and Johar. The name "Kuthi valley" for Byans valley and "Kuthi Yankti" for the river are later coinages, apparently named after the village Kuthi, the main village of the valley. Webb spelt its name as "Koontee", which was presumably related to the "Koontas Mountains" immediately to its northeast.)

The Gazetteer continues to state that the united stream of Kalapani flows five miles southwest, where it is joined by the Kuthi Yankti river that arises from the Limpiyadhura Pass (near the village of Gunji). After this union, the river is called the "Kali River". Language being not entirely logical, the term "Kali River" is often applied to the river from the location of the springs themselves. The springs are considered sacred by the people of the area and "erroneously" regarded as the origin of the Kali River. However, they had been regarded as a landmark by the British from the very first survey undertaken by W. J. Webb in 1816.

Byans divided between Kumaon and Nepal

The area on both sides of the Kali River is called Byans, which was a pargana (district in Mughal times). It is populated by Byansis, who speak a West Himalayish language (closely related to the Zhang-Zhung language once spoken in West Tibet). The Byansis practise transhumance, living in their traditional homes in the high Himalayas during the summer and moving down to towns such as Dharchula in the winter. While high-altitude pastoralism is the mainstay of the Byansis, trade with western Tibet was also a key part of their livelihood. Both the Limpiyadhura pass and the Lipulekh pass were frequently used by the Byansis, but the Lipulekh pass leading to the Tibetan trading town of Burang (or Taklakot) was the most popular.

To the southeast of the Kalapani river is the Tinkar valley (presently in Nepal), with large villages of Changru and Tinkar. This area is also populated by Byansis. They have another pass referred to as Tinkar Pass that leads to Burang.

== History ==
=== Early 19th century ===
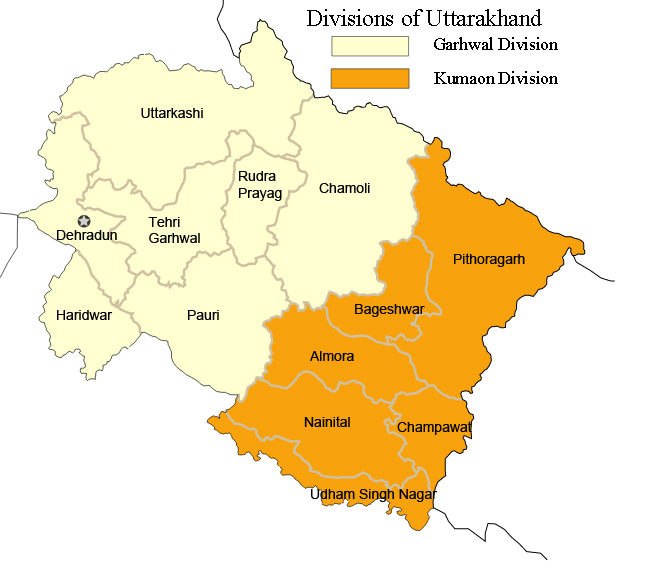
Garhwal and Kumaon in current-day Uttarakhand

Following the Unification of Nepal under Prithvi Narayan Shah, Nepal attempted to enlarge its domains, conquering much of Sikkim in the east and, in the west, the basins of Gandaki and Karnali and the Uttarakhand regions of Garhwal and Kumaon. This brought them in conflict with the British, who controlled directly or indirectly the north Indian plains between Delhi and Calcutta. A series of campaigns termed the Anglo-Nepalese War occurred in 1814–1816. In 1815 the British general Ochterlony evicted the Nepalese from Garhwal and Kumaon across the Kali River, ending the 25-year rule of the region by Nepal. (Note: Whelpton, A History of Nepal (2005, p. 58) states that the Nepalese rule was quite represseive: "[In Jumla] Repression and high revenue demands produced substantial out-migration. ... Jumla's population had declined from around 125,000 before annexation to under 80,000 by 1860.... During the twenty-five years of Gorkhali rule beyond the Mahakali River, the situation was if anything worse, particularly in Kumaon." Oakley, Holy Himalaya (1905, pp. 124–125): "It is said that 200,000 people were sold as slaves in this manner, so that a vast number of villages became deserted, and few families of consequence remained in the country. ... Those who could not pay the taxes and fines arbitrarily imposed on them were sold as slaves." Pradhan, Thapa Politics in Nepal (2012, p. 48): "... due to mismanagement and highhandedness of the Gorkha officials, the people of Kumaon and Garhwal were trying to overthrow the Gorkha rule.")

Octherlony offered peace terms to the Nepalese demanding British oversight through a Resident and the delimitation of Nepal's territories corresponding roughly to its present-day boundaries in the east and west. The Nepalese refusal to accede to these terms led to another campaign the following year, targeting the Kathmandu Valley, after which the Nepalese capitulated.

The resulting agreement, the Sugauli Treaty, states in its Article 5:

The king of Nepal renounces for himself, his heirs, and successors, all claims to and connexion with the countries lying to the West of the River Kali, and engages never to have any concern with those countries or the inhabitants thereof.

Even though the Article was meant to set Kali River as the boundary of Nepal, initially the British administrators retained control of the entire Byans region both to the east and west of the Kali/Kalapani river, stating that it had been traditionally part of Kumaon. In 1817, the Nepalese made a representation to the British, claiming that they were entitled to the areas to the east of Kali. After consideration, the British governor-general in council accepted the demand. The Byans region to the east of Kali was transferred to Nepal, dividing the Byans pargana across the two countries.

Not being satisfied with this, the Nepalese also extended a claim to the Kuthi valley further west, stating that the Kuthi Yankti stream, the western branch of the head waters, should be considered the main Kali River. Surveyor W. J. Webb and other British officials showed that the lesser stream flowing from the Kalapani springs "had always been recognised as the main branch of the Kali" and "had in fact given its name to the river". Consequently, the British Indian government retained the Kuthi valley.

=== Late 19th century ===
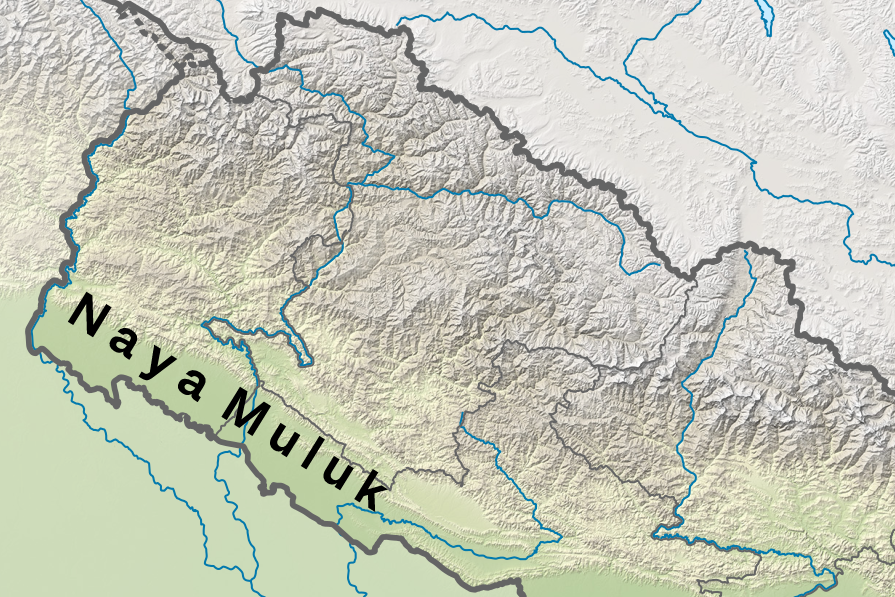
The western Tarai regions (between Kali river to Rapti river, now called Naya Muluk) were returned to Nepal by British India, c. 1860

Some time around 1865, the British shifted the border near Kalapani to the watershed of the Kalapani river instead of the river itself, thereby claiming the area now called the Kalapani territory. This is consistent with the British position that the Kali River begins only from the Kalapani springs, which meant that the agreement of Sugauli did not apply to the region above the springs. Scholars Manandhar and Koirala believe that the shifting of the border was motivated by strategic reasons. The inclusion of the highest point in the region, Point 6172, provides an unhindered view of the Tibetan plateau. For Manandhar and Koirala, this represents an "unauthorized", "unilateral" move on the part of the British. However Nepal was effectively a British-protected state at that time, even though the British termed it an "independent state with special treaty relations". Around the same time that the British claimed the Kalapani territory, they had also ceded to Nepal the western Tarai regions, which were later named "Naya Muluk" ("New Lands") by Nepal. The addition of these regions was of significant economic benefit to Nepal. Nepal's boundaries had moved on from those of the Sugauli treaty.

=== 20th century ===
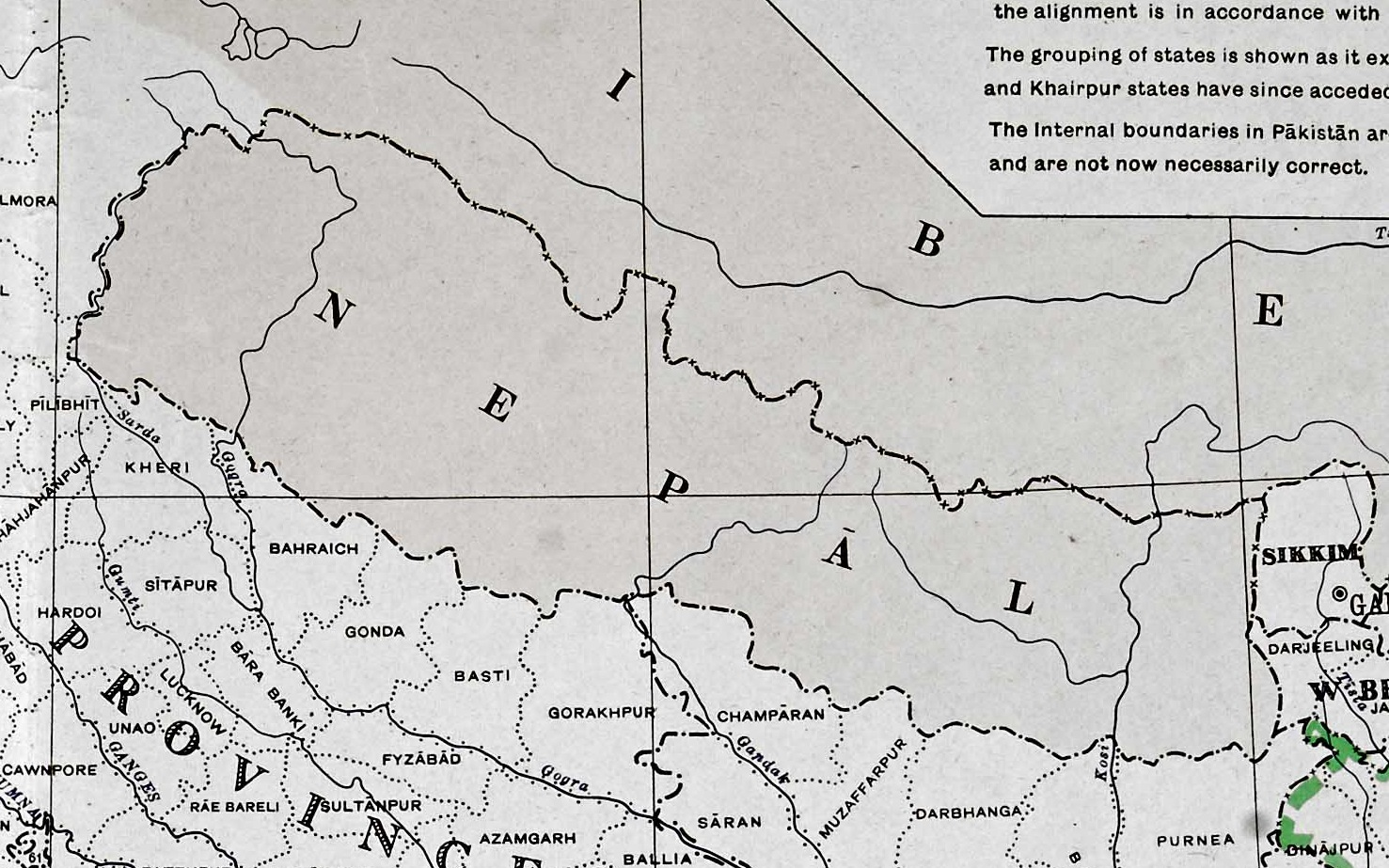
Indo-Nepal border in the first political map of independent India in 1947 (Note: While the Indo-Tibetan border was undefined at this time, indicated as a colour wash, the Indo-Nepalese border was entirely defined)

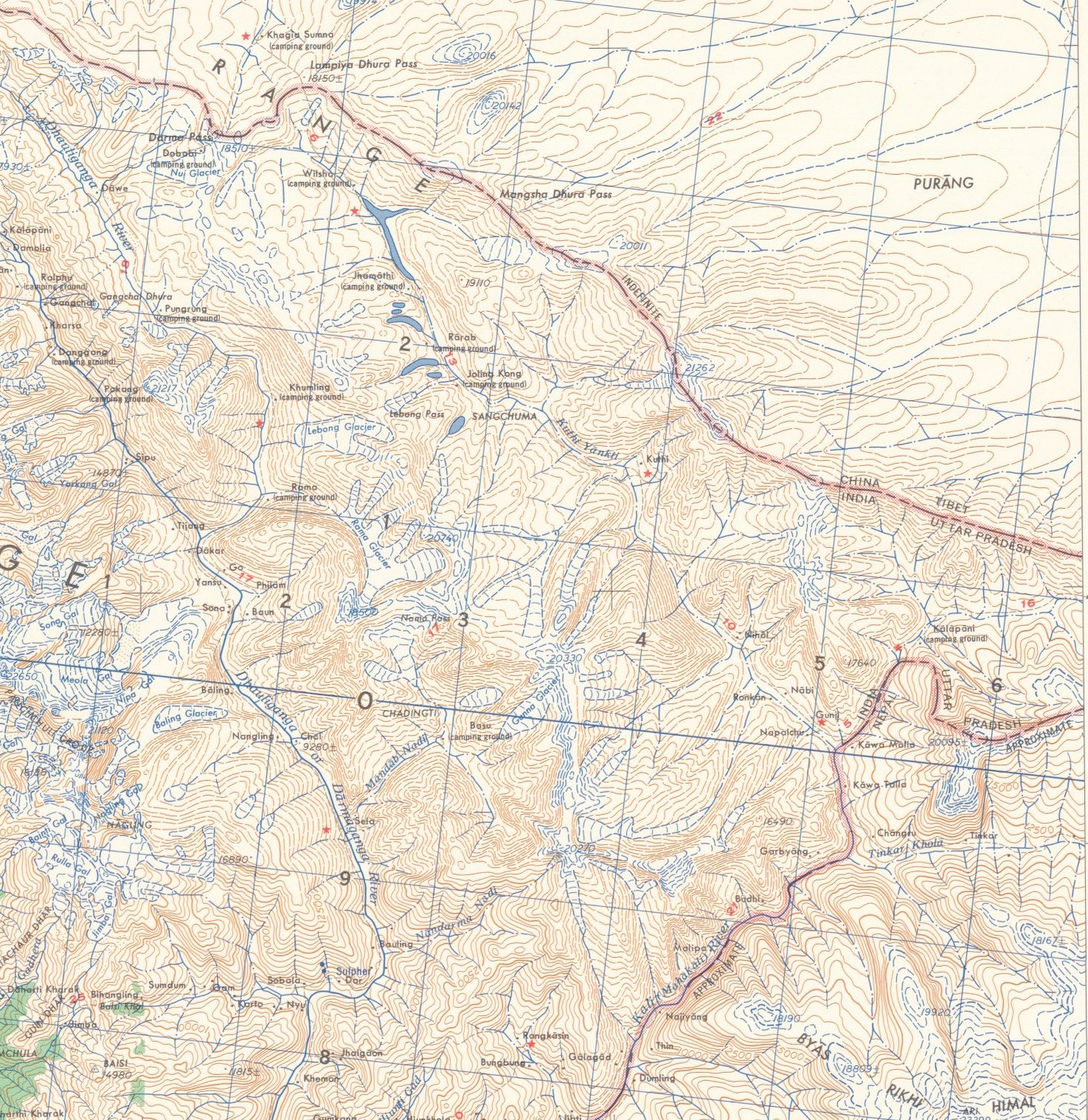
A 1955 US Army map of the Byans region, with the Kalapani territory extending to the northeast

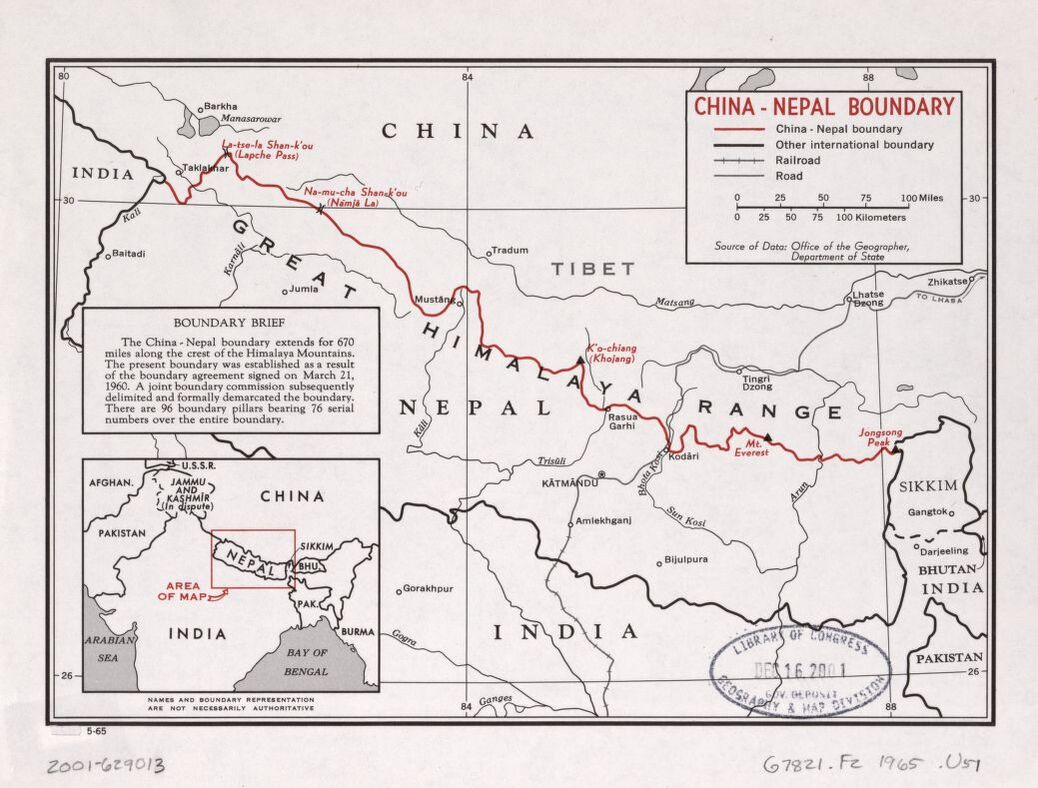
A CIA map of the borders of Nepal, 1965, shows the Kalapani territory as part of India

In 1923, Nepal received recognition from the British as a completely independent state. In 1947, India acquired independence from their rule and became a republic. Nepal and India entered into a Treaty of Peace and Friendship in 1950, which had a strong element of mutual security alliance, mirroring the earlier treaties with British India.

No changes in India's border with Nepal are discernible from the maps of the period. The Kalapani territory continued to be shown as part of India. Following the Chinese take-over of Tibet in 1951, India increased its security presence along the northern border to inhibit possibilities of encroachment and infiltration. The Kalapani area is likely to have been included among such areas. Nepal too requested India's help in policing its northern border as early as 1950, and 17 posts are said to have been established jointly by the two countries.

Nepal expert Sam Cowan states that, from the date of its independence, India "has assumed and acted on the basis that the trail to Lipu Lekh fell exclusively within its territory". The 1954 Trade Agreement between India and China mentioned Lipulekh as one of the passes that could be used by Indo-Tibetan trade and pilgrimage traffic. Nepal was not mentioned in the Agreement. A State Police post was established at Kalapani in 1956, which remained in place till 1979, when it was replaced by Indo-Tibetan Border Police (ITBP). (Note: This followed an ITBP Act passed by the Parliament in 1975, making ITBP responsible for the management of the entire Indo-Tibetan border.)

The China–Nepal boundary agreement signed on 5 October 1961 states:

The Chinese-Nepalese boundary line starts from the point where the watershed between the Kali River and the Tinkar River meet the watershed between the tributaries of the Mapchu (Karnali) River on the one hand and the Tinkar River on the other hand.

So the trijunction of the India–China–Nepal borders was at the meeting point of the watersheds of Karnali, Kali and Tinkar rivers, which lies just to the west of Tinkar Pass. Tinkar Pass is where the Border Pillar number 1 of the China–Nepal border was placed, and still remains.

After the 1962 border war with China, India closed the Lipulekh Pass. The Byansis of Kumaon then used the Tinkar Pass for all their trade with Tibet. In 1991, India and China agreed to reopen the Lipulekh pass, and the trade through it steadily increased.

== Kalapani dispute (1991–2019) ==
According to local testimonials, Nepalese citizens were not allowed to access the Lipulekh Pass after its closure in 1963, despite the free movement regime operating between the two countries. They had been blocked by Indo-Tibetan Border Police either at Kalapani or even before reaching it. This might have been of no importance prior to 1991, but with the opening of the Lipulekh Pass for border trade in that year, murmurs started in Nepal. Nepal transitioned to multiparty democracy in 1990, and communist parties rose to challenge the dominant Nepali Congress, with CPN-UML being the chief among them. An irredentist Greater Nepal movement also got created in 1991 to demand all the lands lost to the British East India Company in 1819, attracting prominent intellectuals such as Buddhi Narayan Shrestha, former director general of the survey department. Territorial claims were ripe for picking in this context.

It was in 1996 that the matter came to a head. (Note: Nepalese media claim that the country formally raised the "border issue" with India in 1991 and that a technical committee was formed to resolve it. However, Sam Cowan points out that the Kalapani issue was raised only in 1996 and the committee was formed years later.) When the Mahakali Treaty (for water and power sharing) came up for debate in the Nepalese Parliament, the opposition Communist party raised 27 "flaws" in the agreement, one of which was the existence of an Indian security camp at Kalapani. The issue immediately became "highly charged", according to Himal Southasian. CPN-ML, which split from UML on the issue of the treaty, organised a 'Kalapani march' in 1998, which was blocked before reaching the Indian border. Successive Nepalese governments kept claiming, "Kalapani is ours!".

A number of unverified, and possibly unfounded, claims came into circulation during these protests and debates. The main one claims that the Indian Army was stationed at Kalapani during the 1962 Sino-Indian War through a concession granted by King Mahendra of Nepal, and that the Indian Army continued to occupy it afterwards. Another claim states that King Birendra asked Nepal's survey department to exclude the Kalapani territory from Nepal map in 1975 in order to please India. Sam Cowan points out that there is no evidence of any skirmishing in the area during Sino-Indian War, and that the Kalapani territory was already excluded in the 1961 border agreement with China. Scholar Leo Rose states that Nepal virtually ignored the Kalapani issue from 1961 to 1997 and it became "convenient" for it to raise the controversy for domestic political reasons.

In September 1998, Nepal agreed with India that all border disputes, including Kalapani, would be resolved through bilateral talks. However, despite several rounds of negotiations between 1998 and 2008, the joint boundary committee could reach no resolution on the issue. It was then referred to the foreign secretary-level talks. Nepal maintained that the Kali River originated at the Lipulekh Pass via the Lipu Gad/Kalapani streams. Nepal's maps in this period showed the border running along the river. Indian officials responded that the administrative records dating back to 1830s show that the Kalapani area had been administered as part of the Pithoragarh district (then a part of the Almora district). India also denied the Nepalese contention that Lipu Gad was the Kali River. In the Indian view, the Kali River begins only after Lipu Gad is joined by other streams arising from the Kalapani springs. Therefore, the Indian border leaves the midstream of river near Kalapani and follows the high watershed of the streams that join it.

=== Economic factors in the dispute ===
The decision of the British Governor-General in 1817 to transfer Tinkar valley to Nepal (which was earlier in Kumaon) divided the Byans region into two parts, leaving the Kuthi valley as well as the main travel route to Tibet in India and the Tinkar valley in Nepal. The Tinkar valley is cut off from the rest of Nepal by high north–south mountain ranges, with the only travel connection via Dharchula through Indian territory. The open border operating between the two countries allowed the residents of Tinkar valley to use the Indian road to access Dharchula. Prior to 1960, it also allowed them access to the Lipulekh pass for trade with Tibet. Henry Strachey reported in 1848 that the Tinkar valley residents used the Lipulekh pass because the population on the Nepal side was too small to form a "good beaten path" (in snow) to the Tinkar Pass.

After the 1962 Sino-Indian War, the Lipulekh Pass was closed. Then both the Indian and Nepalese Byansis used the Tinkar Pass for their trade with Tibet. In fact, considerable wildlife trafficking is believed to have been carried out via the pass. In 1991, India and China agreed to reopen Lipulekh Pass. This was a boon to the Indian Byansis, but the Nepalese Byansis were not allowed to use the pass, or to enter Kalapani, regarded a strategic post by India.

== Lympiadhura claims (2019–present) ==
CPN-ML led by Bam Dev Gautam, which had split from CPN-UML in 1998, laid more expansive claims than the Nepalese government. Several Nepalese intellectuals drove these claims, chief among them being Buddhi Narayan Shrestha, the former Director General of the Land Survey Department. According to the intellectuals, the "Kali River" is in fact the Kuthi Yankti river that arises below the Limpiyadhura range. So they claim the entire area of Kumaon up to the Kuthi Valley, close to 400 km^{2} in total. Up to 2000, the Nepalese government did not subscribe to these expansive demands. In a statement to the Indian Parliament in 2000, the Indian foreign minister Jaswant Singh suggested that Nepal had questioned the source of the Kalapani river. But he denied that there was any dispute regarding the matter.

In May 2020, India inaugurated a new link road to the Kailas-Manasarovar. Nepal objected to the exercise and said that it was violative of the prior understanding that boundary issues would be resolved through negotiation. India reaffirmed its commitment to negotiation but stated that the road follows the pre-existing route.

On 20 May 2020, Nepal for the first time released a map that followed through with the more expansive claims, showing the entire area to the east of Kuthi Yankti river as part of their territory. On 13 June 2020, the bill seeking to give legal status to the new map was unanimously approved by the lower house in the Nepal Parliament.

== Gallery ==
Kalapani at different times
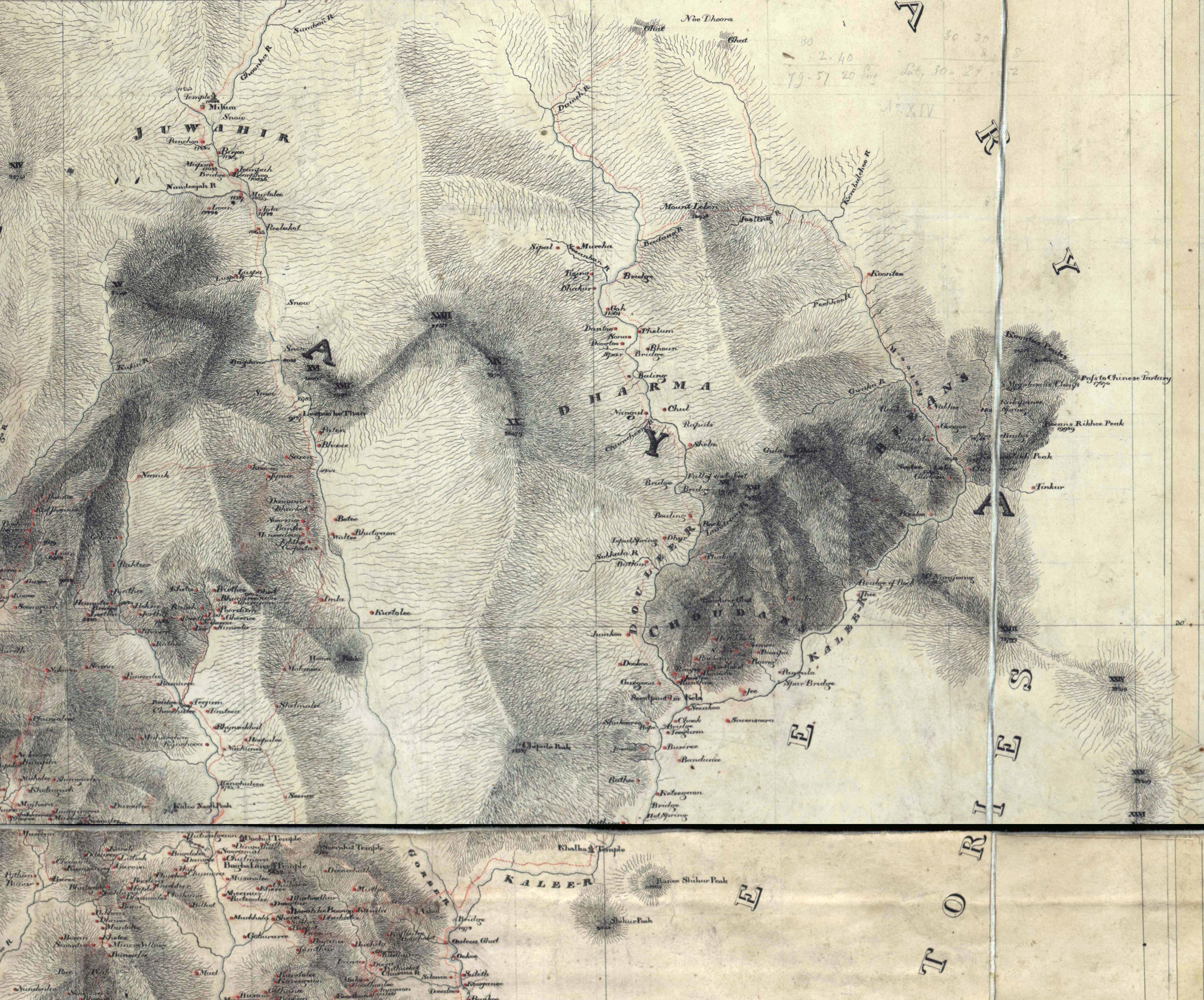
A section of the Survey map of W. J. Webb drawn in 1819 shows a source of Kali river flowing through Beans (Byans Valley) (Note: The river is labelled "Kalee-R" with upside down lettering, in a style different from all the other rivers.)

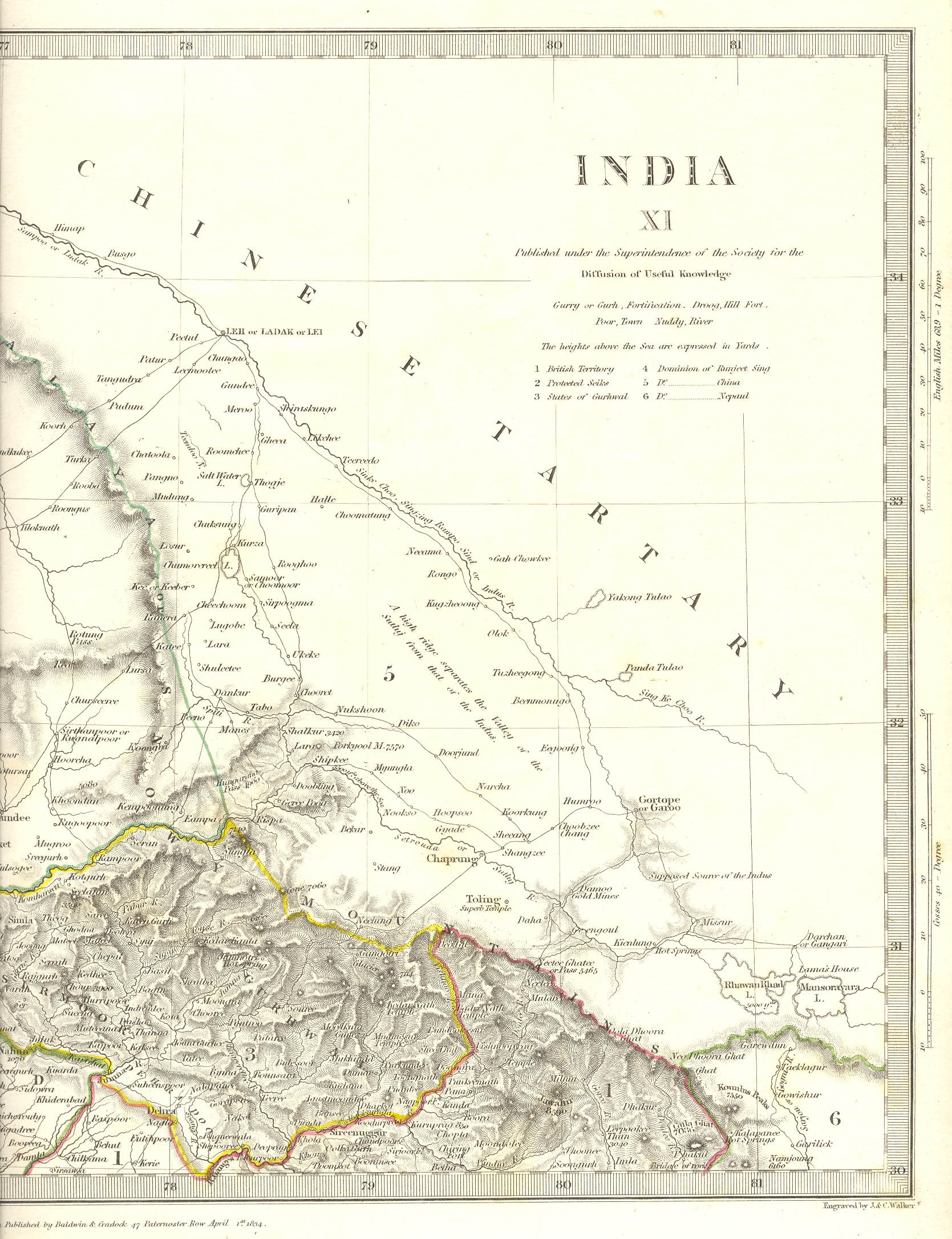
SDUK map of 1834 shows the source of Kali river flowing through Byans valley, also shown as the international border

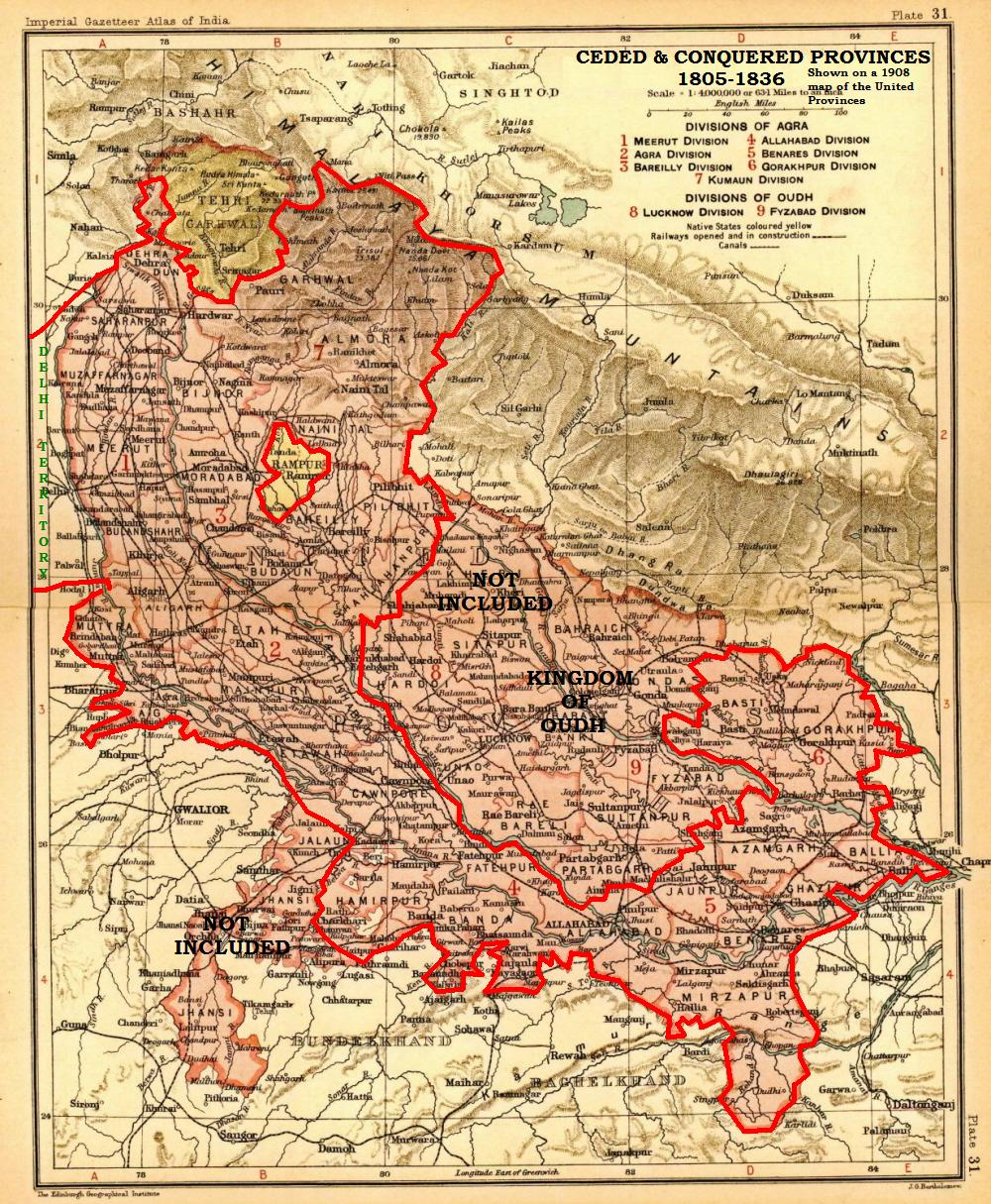
Historical map of 1805–1836 (printed in 1908) shows Lipulekh as the trijunction

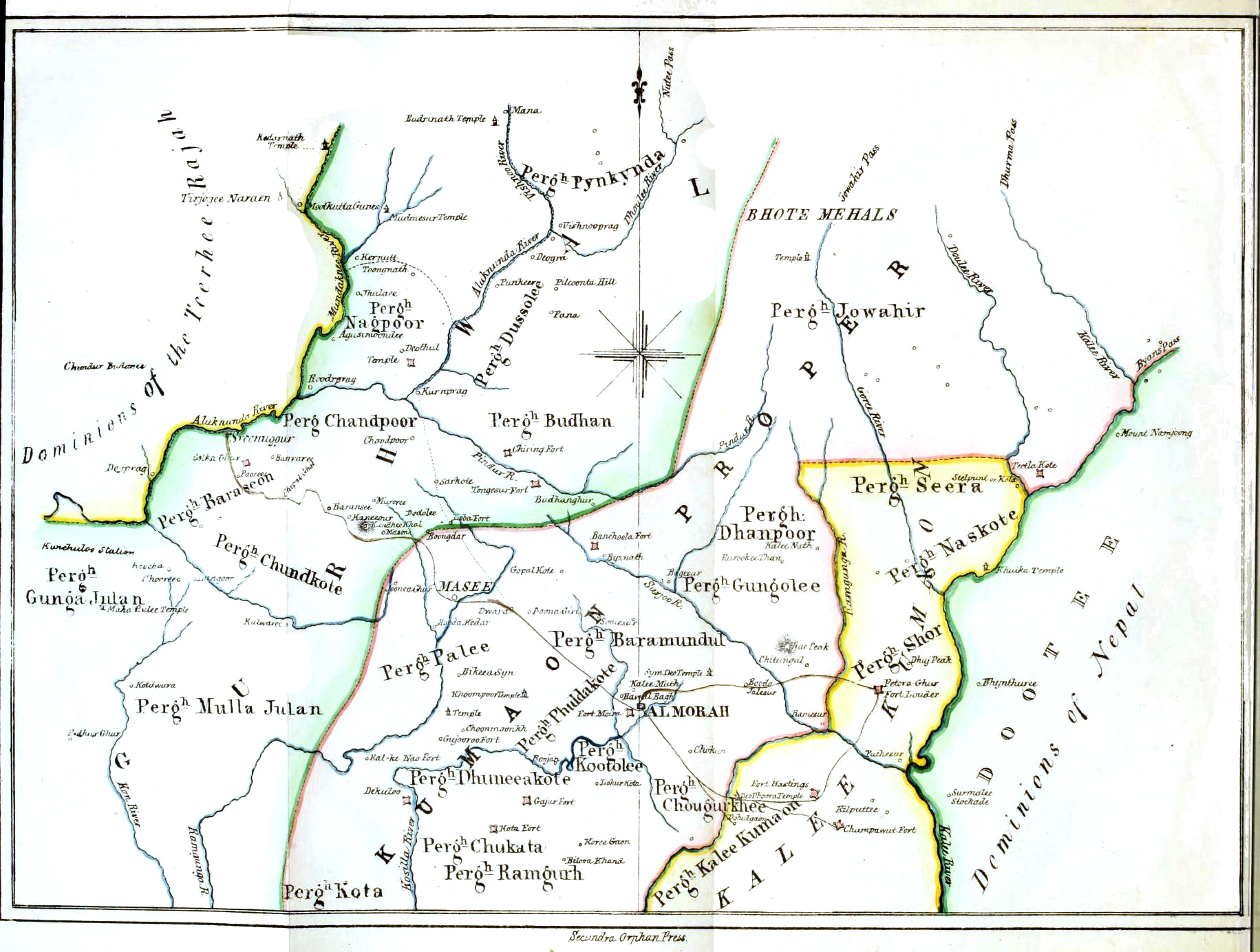
Official map of 1851 shows the Kali river in Kumaon and the border along the Kalapani river near Lipulekh

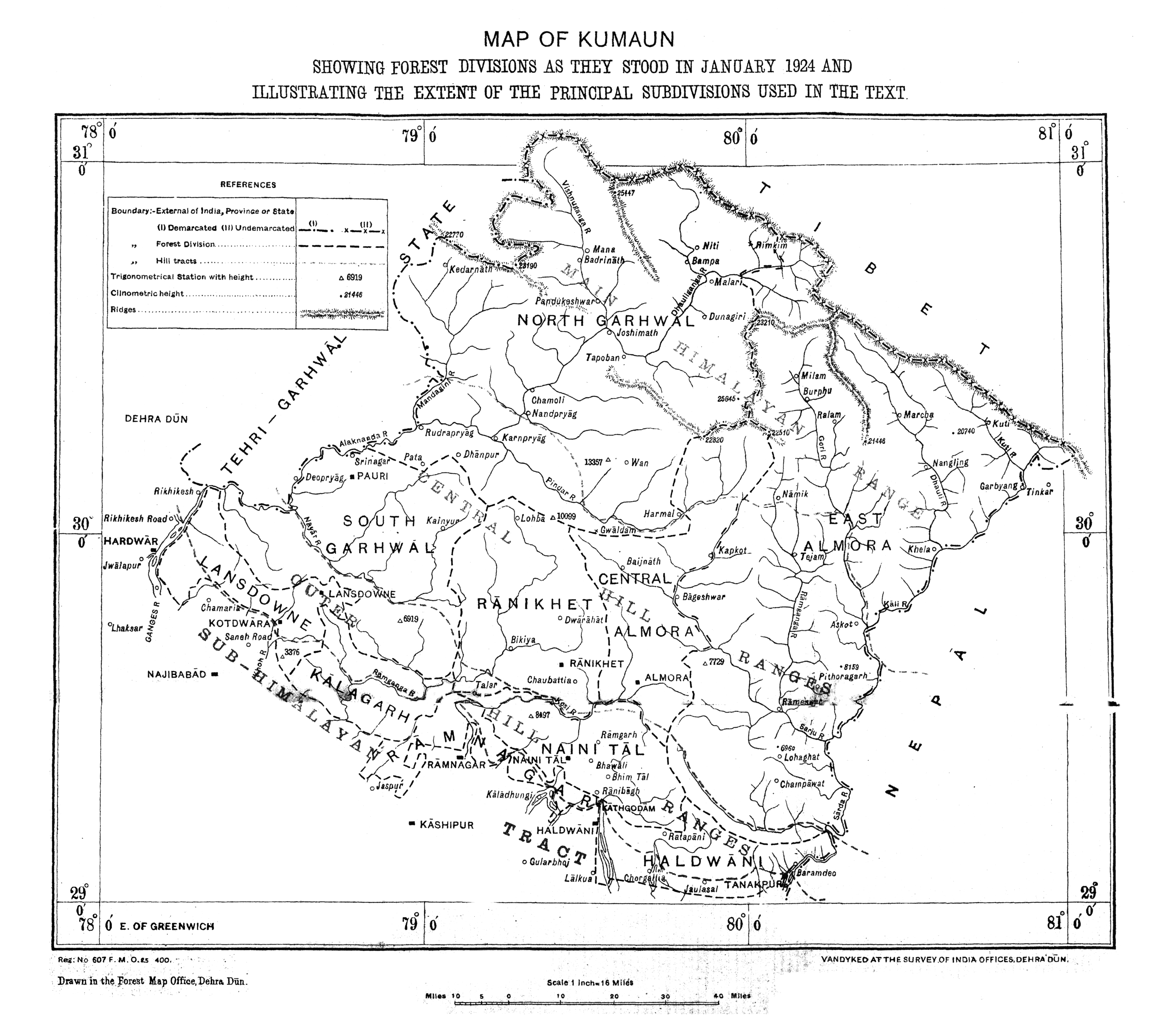
Map of Kumaon in 1924, showing Kuti river flowing from Limpiyadhura, Kali river from Lipulekh but the Kalapani area is in Kumaon (India)

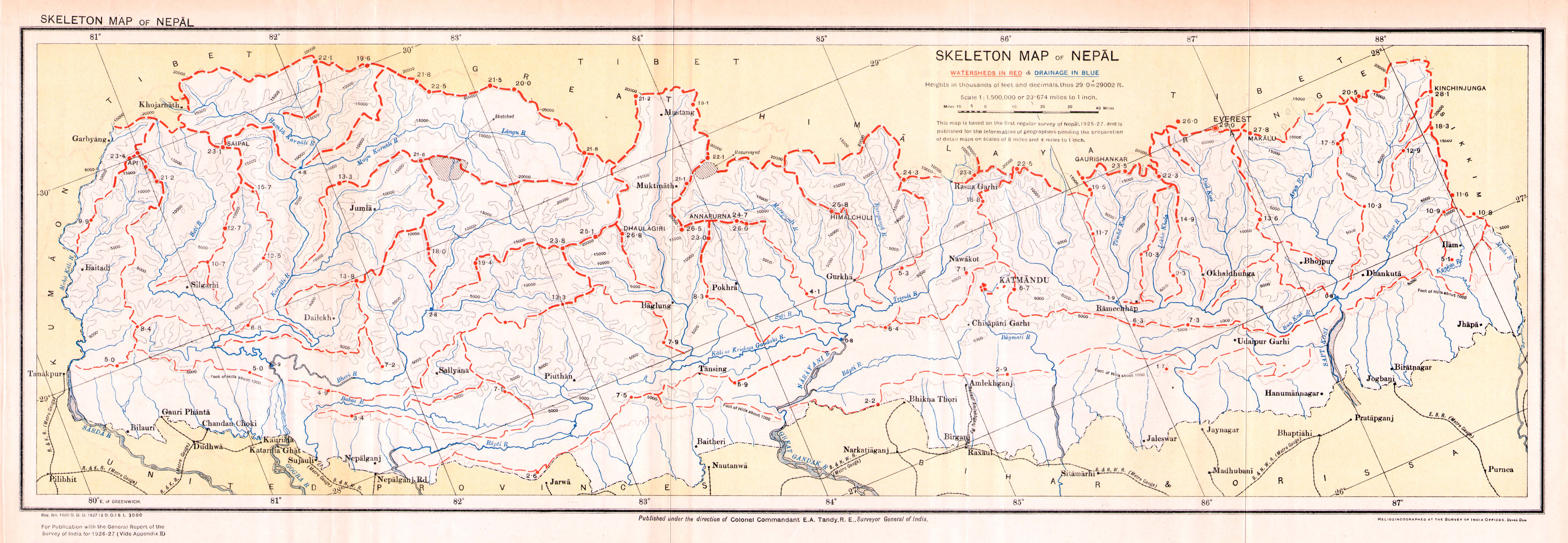
Map of Nepal by Survey of India in 1927 excluding Kalapani area from Nepal

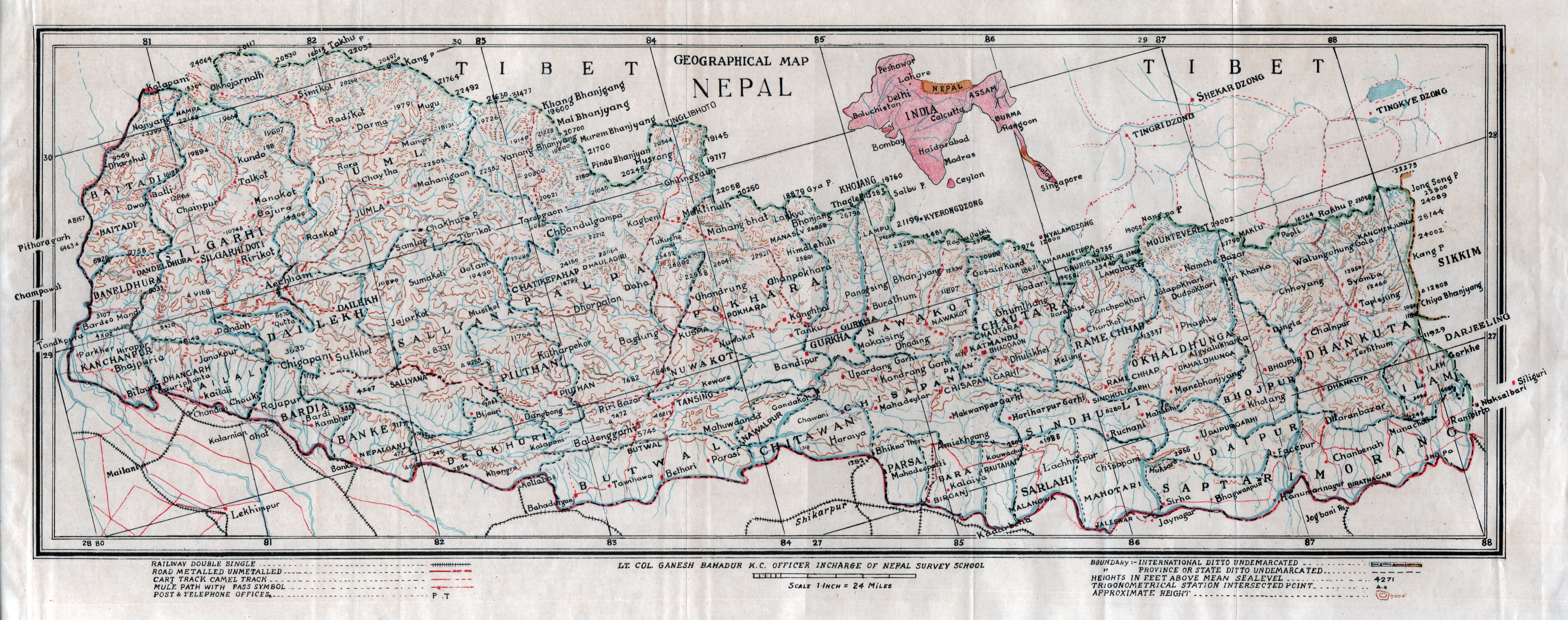
A map of Nepal drawn by Ganesh Bahadur KC (Nepal survey School) in 1942 shows "undemarkated border", excluding Kalapani territory.

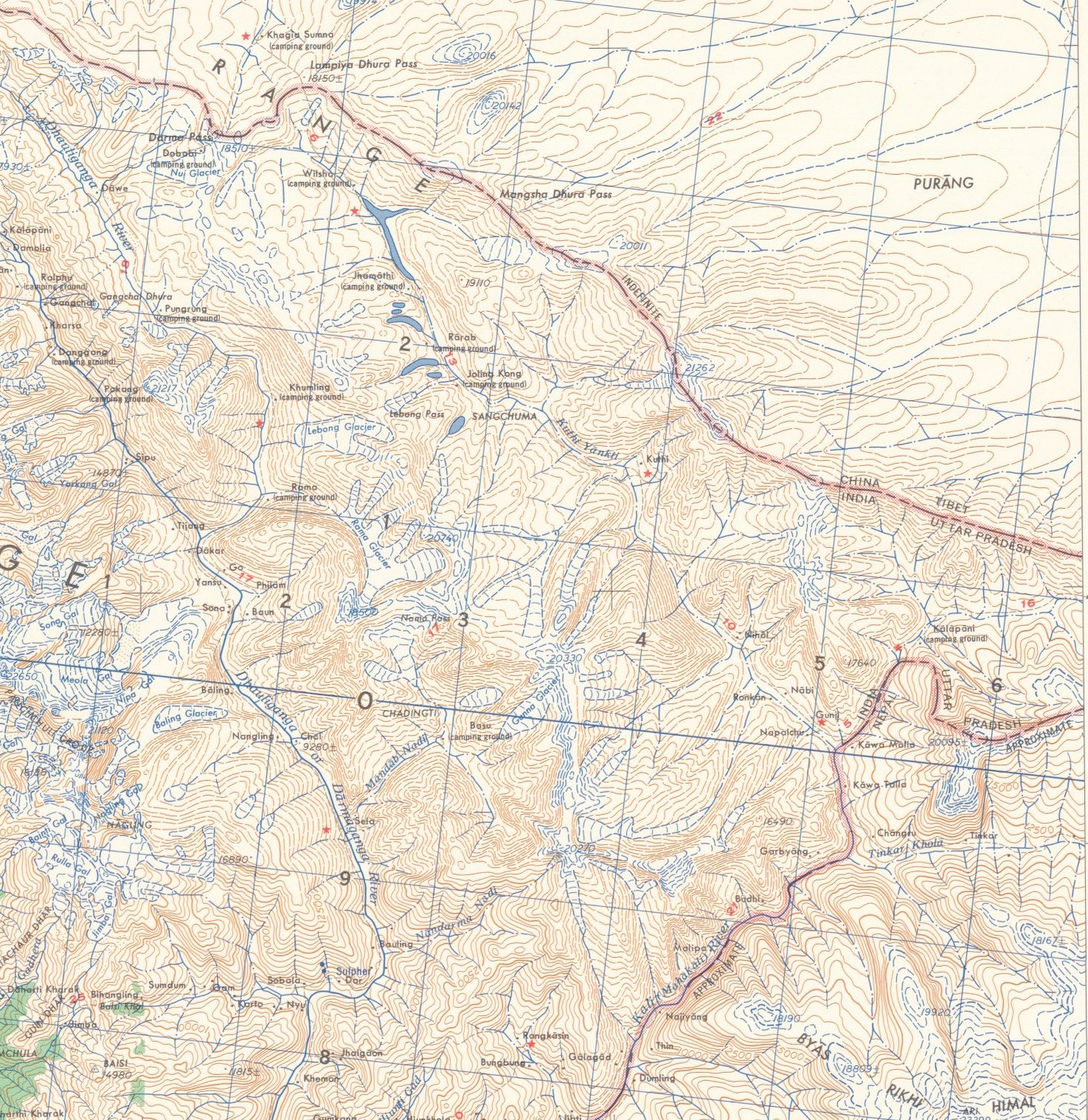
US army map of 1955 continues showing undemarkated Indo-Nepal border

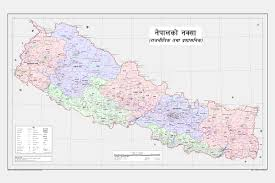
Map of Nepal promulgated by the Government of Nepal in 2020 includes the Kalapani, Limpiyadhura and Lipukekh

== See also ==
- Territorial disputes of India and Nepal
- Susta territory
- China–Nepal border

== Bibliography ==
- Atkinson, Edwin Thomas (1981) [first published 1884], The Himalayan Gazetteer, Volume 2, Part 2, Cosmo Publications – via archive.org
- Atkinson, Edwin Thomas (1981) [first published 1884], The Himalayan Gazetteer, Volume 3, Part 2, Cosmo Publications – via archive.org
- Bhatta, Chandra D.; Menge, Jonathan, eds. (2022), Gaida's Dance with Tiger and Dragon, Kathmandu: Friedrich Ebert Stiftung, ISBN 978-9937-1-1023-5 – via researchgate.net
  - Wagle, Achyut (2022), "Nepal's Economic Development: Regional Geopolitical Considerations", Ibid, pp. 21–
  - Nayak, Nihar R. (2022), "Intensifying India-China Rivalry and its Implications for Nepal", Ibid, pp. 131–
- Chatterjee, Bishwa B. (January 1976), "The Bhotias of Uttarakhand", India International Centre Quarterly, 3 (1): 3–16, JSTOR 23001864
- Cowan, Sam (2015), The Indian checkposts, Lipu Lekh, and Kalapani, School of Oriental and African Studies, archived from the original on 19 April 2016 – via recordnepal.com
- Dhungel, Dwarika Nath; Pun, Santa Bahadur (2014), "Nepal-India Relations: Territorial/Border Issue with Specific Reference to Mahakali River", FPRC Journal, New Delhi: Foreign Policy Research Centre – via academia.edu
- Gupta, Alok Kumar (June–December 2009) [2000], "The Context of New-Nepal: Challenges and Opportunities for India", Indian Journal of Asian Affairs, 22 (1/2): 57–73, JSTOR 41950496. IPCS preprint
- Kavic, Lorne J. (1967), India's Quest for Security: Defence Policies, 1947-1965, University of California Press
- Manandhar, Mangal Siddhi; Koirala, Hriday Lal (June 2001), "Nepal-India Boundary Issue: River Kali as International Boundary", Tribhuvan University Journal, 23 (1)
- Manzardo, Andrew E.; Dahal, Dilli Ram; Rai, Navin Kumar (1976), "The Byanshi: An ethnographic note on a trading group in far western Nepal" (PDF), INAS Journal, 3 (2), Institute of Nepal and Asian Studies, Tribhuvan University: 84–118, PMID 12311979
- Negi, R. S; Singh, J.; Das, J. C. (1996), "Trade and Trade-Routes in the Cis and Trans Himalayas: Pattern of Traditional Entrepreneurship Among the Indian Highlanders", in Makhan Jha (ed.), The Himalayas: An Anthropological Perspective, M.D. Publications Pvt. Ltd., pp. 53–66, ISBN 978-81-7533-020-7
- Oakley, E. Sherman (1905), Holy Himalaya: The Religion, Traditions, and Scenery of a Himalayan Province (Kumaon and Garhwal), Oliphant Anderson & Ferrier – via archive.org
- Pradhan, Kumar L. (2012), Thapa Politics in Nepal: With Special Reference to Bhim Sen Thapa, 1806–1839, New Delhi: Concept Publishing Company, ISBN 9788180698132
- Rose, Leo E. (1971), Nepal – Strategy for Survival, University of California Press, ISBN 978-0-520-01643-9
- Rose, Leo E. (January–February 1999), "Nepal and Bhutan in 1998: Two Himalayan Kingdoms", Asian Survey, 39 (1): 155–162, doi:10.2307/2645605, JSTOR 2645605
- Schrader, Heiko (1988), Trading Patterns in the Nepal Himalayas, Bow Historical Books, ISBN 978-3-88156-405-2
- Śreshṭha, Buddhi Nārāyaṇa, ed. (2003), Border Management of Nepal, Bhumichitra, ISBN 978-99933-57-42-1
- Shrestha, Buddhi N. (2013), "Demarcation of the International Boundaries of Nepal" (PDF), in Haim Srebro (ed.), International Boundary Making, Copenhagen: International Federation of Surveyors, pp. 149–182, ISBN 978-87-92853-08-0
- Singh, Raj Kumar (2010), Relations of NDA and UPA with Neighbours, Gyan Publishing House, ISBN 978-81-212-1060-7
- Strachey, Lieut. H. (September 1848), James Prinsep (ed.), "Narration of a Journey to Cho Lagan, (Rakas Tal), Cho Mapan (Manasarowar), and the valley of Pruang in Gnari, Hundes, in September and October 1846", The Journal of the Asiatic Society of Bengal, 17: 98–120, 127–182, 327–351
- Upadhya, Sanjay (2012), Nepal and the Geo-Strategic Rivalry between China and India, Routledge, ISBN 978-1-136-33550-1
- Walton, H. G., ed. (1911), Almora: A Gazetteer, District Gazetteers of the United Provinces of Agra and Oudh, vol. 35, Government Press, United Provinces – via archive.org
- Whelpton, John (2005), A History of Nepal, Cambridge University Press, ISBN 978-0-521-80470-7
