= Nirmand =

Historic village in Kullu district, Himachal Pradesh, India

Nirmand Nirmund, Nermand
- Village
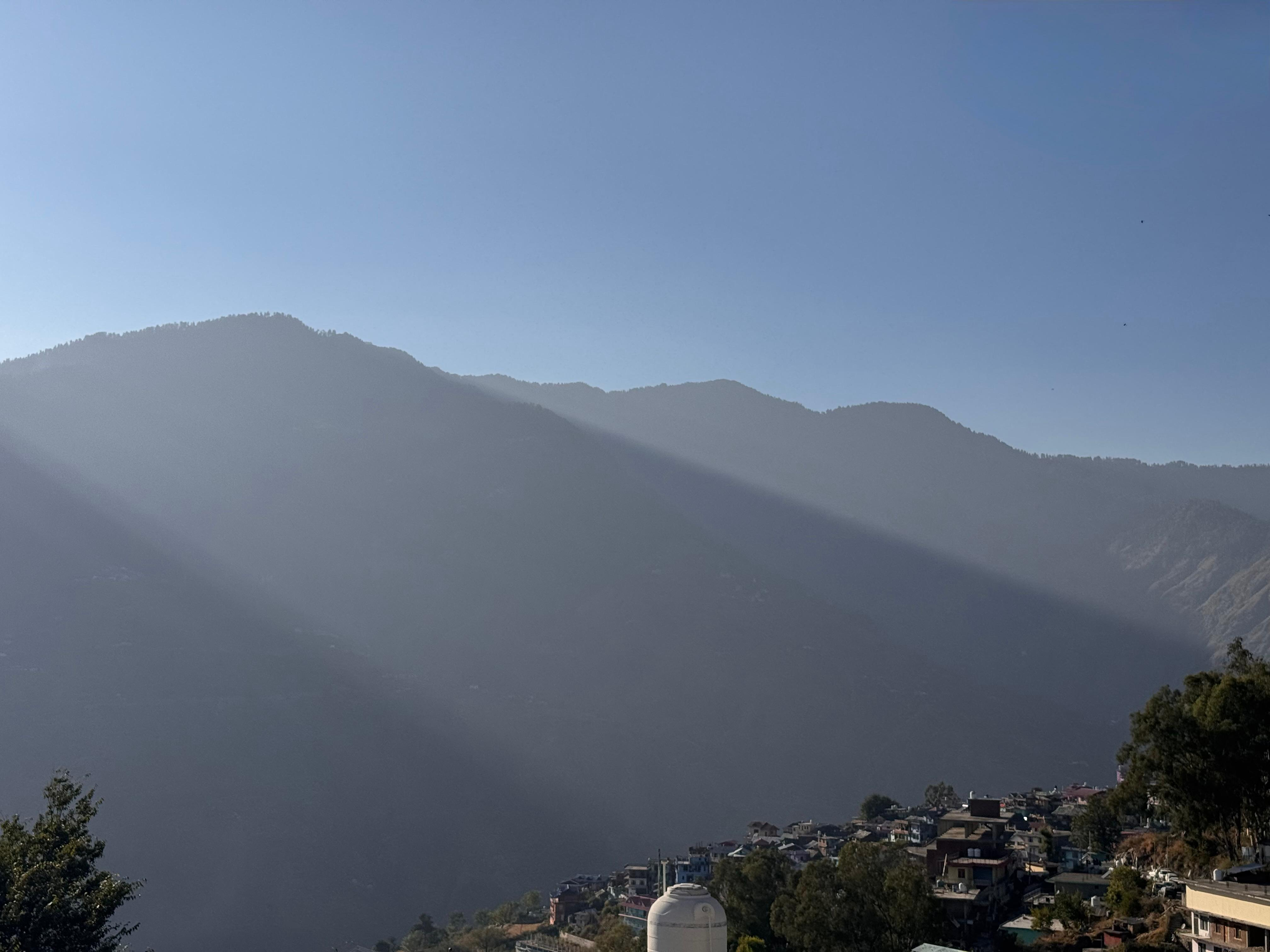
- The village of Nirmand during sunrise
- Nickname: Kashi of the Himalayas
- Location in Himachal Pradesh, India Nirmand (India)
- Coordinates: 31°25′59″N 77°34′59″E
- Country: India
- State: Himachal Pradesh
- District: Kullu
- Tehsil: Nermand

Area
  - Total: 11.02 km^{2} (4.25 sq mi)
- Elevation: 1,450 m (4,760 ft)

Population (2011)
  - Total: 6,593
  - Density: 598.3/km^{2} (1,550/sq mi)

Languages
  - Official: Hindi
  - Regional: Kullui (Seraji)
- Time zone: UTC+5:30 (IST)
- PIN: 172023
- Vehicle registration: HP-35AA

Nirmand (also spelled Nirmund and Nermand) is a large historic village in the Seraj (Outer Seraj) region of Kullu district in the Indian state of Himachal Pradesh. It serves as the headquarters of Nermand tehsil and the gram panchayat for a cluster of surrounding villages - it became a nagar panchayat in 2020. Situated on terraces above the left (north) bank of the Sutlej River, opposite Rampur Bushahr, Nirmand is known for its ensemble of medieval wooden-and-stone temples in the regional kath-kuni construction tradition and for its continuous ritual life.Shrikhand Mahadev, one of the five kailash peaks is located in Nirmand sub-division.

Local literature and tourism promotion often describe Nirmand as the "Kashi of the Himalayas" because of its large number of shrines and its status as a regional pilgrimage centre. The 2011 Census of India recorded Nermand village as having a population of 6,593 in 1,513 households.

== Ancient history and early settlement ==
Direct archaeological excavation in Nirmand has been limited, and much of its early history is reconstructed from inscriptions and from the fabric of its temples. A key source is a copper‑plate land grant preserved in the Ambika Devi temple, issued by the regional ruler Samudrasena (styled mahasamanta Samudrasena) and dated on palaeographic grounds to about the 7th century CE. The inscription records the establishment of an agrahara named Nirmand, endowed for Brahmins learned in the Atharvaveda, whom the king is said to have invited from a place called Subisagrama. It also states that Samudrasena's mother Mihiralakshmi commissioned temples for Mihireshvara (a form of Surya) and Kapileshvara (Shiva), underlining the emergence of Nirmand as a Brahmanical religious centre by the early medieval period.

The Ambika Devi temple itself, together with early stone and metal images preserved in its premises and in the nearby Parashurama Kothi, has been stylistically dated to between the 6th and 8th centuries CE, making it one of the oldest surviving temple sites in the Kullu valley. A black stone image of the goddess Durga/Ambika in Himalayan dress, covered in gold leaf and locally believed to have connections with Varanasi and Rajput patrons from Jaipur, is among the most notable icons at the site.

At the entrance to the Parashurama Kothi a stone idol of Vishnu in standing pose has been dated on stylistic grounds to the 6th or 7th century CE. Local scholar Pandit Padam Chand Kashyap has argued, as reported in regional heritage writing, that this may be older than the more widely known Vishnu image in the 11th‑century Hari Rai Temple at Chamba, and thus among the earliest surviving Vishnu icons in Himachal Pradesh.

Local oral traditions, recorded in modern Himachali literature and tourism writing, project Nirmand's origins much deeper into mythic time. They present the village as a foundation of Parashurama established after the destruction of a pan‑Himalayan Sarasvati–Indus civilisation, when the avatar is said to have resettled displaced groups in the area, including 500 Brahmins, 60 artisans and 120 farmers. These narratives, while not corroborated by archaeology, reinforce the village's image in regional memory as an exceptionally old seat of Brahmanical learning and temple patronage in the western Himalaya.

== Fairs and festivals ==
Nirmand participates in the wider devta (living deity) tradition of Kullu district, in which village gods and goddesses are treated as corporate persons with their own estates, palanquins (rath) and oracular mediums (gur). Major pan‑Indian festivals such as Navaratri, Diwali, Dussehra and Maha Shivaratri are observed with processions of the palanquins of Ambika Devi, Parashurama and Dakshineshwar Mahadev, while a number of region‑specific observances remain central to village identity.

=== Budhi Diwali ===
Budhi Diwali (literally "old Diwali") is celebrated in Nirmand and other villages of the Outer Seraj region roughly one lunar month after the main Diwali festival observed elsewhere in India. In Nirmand it combines household worship with community gatherings in temple courtyards, offerings to local deities and folk drumming and dance. Regional heritage writers link Budhi Diwali to older agrarian and Vedic ritual cycles, particularly narratives of the battle between Indra and the drought‑bringing demon Vritra, and see it as a continuation of rain‑invoking and protective rites remembered in local mythology.

=== Bhunda festival ===
One of the best‑known ritual events associated with Nirmand is the Bhunda festival (often termed Bhunda mahayajna), a large‑scale ceremony held at long intervals—typically about every twelve years—in Nirmand and a cluster of surrounding villages of Outer Seraj and the former Bushahr state. The rite is dedicated variously to Parashurama, Devi Ambika and other local deities and draws participants from Brahmin‑dominated settlements in the Nirmand area.

Ethnographic and local historical accounts characterise Bhunda as a survival of an earlier Narmegha ("human‑cloud") sacrifice described in village mythology, in which a human victim was once believed to have been offered to ensure rainfall and avert calamity. Modern writers emphasise that actual human sacrifice is no longer practised, and describe Bhunda instead as a "ritual remnant" in which dangerous and spectacular acts are undertaken symbolically in place of a sacrificial death.

The central public spectacle of Bhunda in Nirmand involves the Beda, a man from a hereditary specialist family who prepares and then descends a long rope made from munji grass stretched across a ravine near the village. The Beda weaves the rope in the weeks leading up to the festival, and during the ceremony travels along it on a wooden seat or harness while thousands of onlookers watch from the surrounding slopes. Earlier narratives present this as a perilous ordeal closely tied to vows undertaken by the Beda's lineage; more recent reports highlight the introduction of safety precautions and the symbolic character of the act.

Within local classificatory schemes Bhunda is regarded primarily as a Brahmin festival, with parallel but distinct ceremonies such as Shant for Rajputs and Bhoj for Koli communities in the same cultural zone. Comparable Bhunda‑type rituals continue to be organised in other parts of the Sutlej basin, particularly in Rohru and Rampur tehsils of Shimla district, underlining the shared ritual heritage linking Nirmand with the wider Bushahr region.

=== Other local fairs ===
In addition to these large‑scale observances, Nirmand hosts periodic fairs (mela) at the Ambika Devi, Parashurama and Dakshineshwar Mahadev temples, as well as smaller village gatherings tied to sowing and harvest seasons. These events typically feature processions of temple palanquins, drumming, folk dance and the presence of itinerant ascetics, reflecting Nirmand's long‑standing role as both a pilgrimage centre and a stopping place on regional trade and transhumance routes.

== Geography ==
Nirmand lies in the Outer Seraj region of southern Kullu district on a spur of the mid-Himalaya, overlooking the Sutlej valley. The inhabited area stands on south-facing agricultural terraces between roughly 1,350 and 1,500 metres (4,430–4,920 ft) above sea level and commands views towards the Sutlej gorge and the higher ridges of Kinnaur and interior Kullu. The village is about 17 km by road north of Rampur Bushahr and around 150 km from Shimla, the state capital.

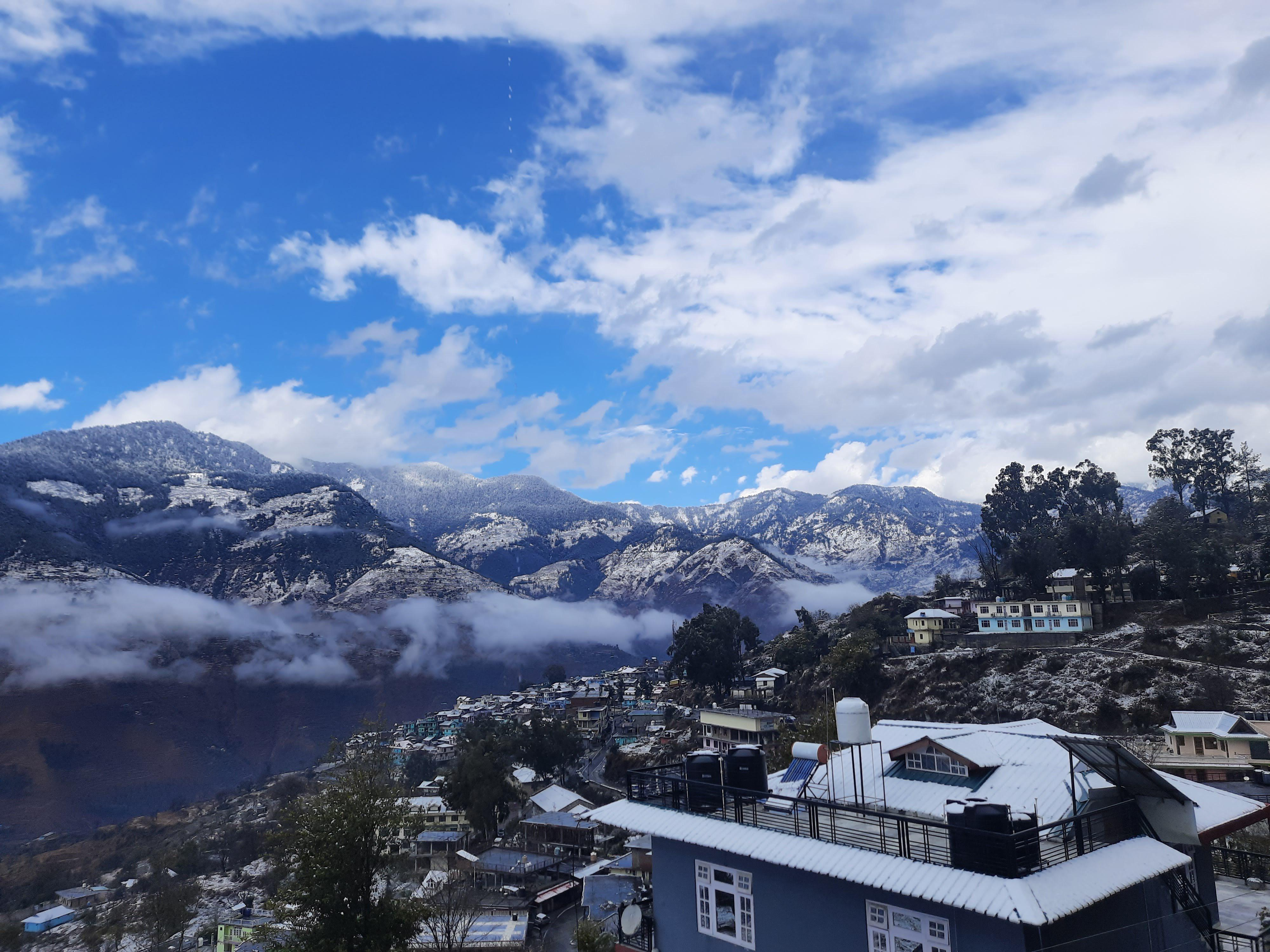
A snow-laden Nirmand during the winters

== Mythology and religious significance ==
Like many settlements in the western Himalaya, Nirmand is woven into a network of local myths that link it to pan‑Indian Hindu narratives. According to local legend recorded in modern Himachali writing, the village was founded by Parashurama, the sixth avatar of Vishnu, who settled groups of Brahmins here and in neighbouring villages as part of his penance after the slaying of his mother Renuka. In these traditions Nirmand is one of a group of sacred Parashurama settlements that also includes villages such as Dattanagar, Neerath, Kaav and Mamel in the wider Sutlej basin.

Another strand of local belief interprets the toponym Nirmand as derived from nrimunda ("human head") and associates the place with the dismemberment of the goddess Sati: villagers recount that Sati's severed head is believed to have fallen here after the destruction of the Daksha yajna. This narrative links Nirmand to the wider Shakta pitha tradition and underlines the village's importance in regional goddess worship.

Local lore also links the area to the Pandavas, who are said to have passed through or stayed in the region during their exile as narrated in the Mahabharata.

== Temples and architecture ==
Nirmand contains a dense cluster of historic temples and shrines built in stone and deodar wood. A number of them exhibit the interlocking timber-and-rubble construction commonly termed kath-kuni in Himachal Pradesh.

One of the principal shrines is the Ambika (Ambika Devi) Temple, dedicated to a form of Durga. The temple is largely wooden, with intricately carved wall panels, door frames and brackets depicting deities, floral scrolls and protective motifs. Ambika is regarded as a tutelary goddess of the village, and festivals in her honour attract participants from the wider Seraj region.

The Parashurama Temple (often referred to locally as Parshu Ram Kothi or the Shankh temple) is dedicated to Parashurama and reflects the strong presence of Parashurama-related lore in Nirmand. The shrine combines a wooden superstructure with a stone plinth and features detailed carvings; local belief holds that Parashurama meditated in the area.

The Dakshineshwar Mahadev Temple is a prominent Shiva shrine visited throughout the year, with heightened activity during festivals such as Maha Shivaratri. Besides these major temples, Nirmand has several smaller shrines dedicated to local goddess forms and to Vishnu, as well as a traditional stepwell (baoli).

Art-historical surveys note that carved wooden and stone elements preserved in Nirmand’s temples and in nearby houses can be dated stylistically between about the 7th and 14th centuries CE, indicating a long history of occupation and ritual activity at the site.

A short distance from the main settlement is the Deo Dhank cave, a natural rock shelter associated with earlier generations of ascetics and meditants; it is today visited as a quiet local pilgrimage spot.

== Demographics ==
According to the 2011 Census of India, Nermand village had a population of 6,593 persons living in 1,513 households. Of the total population, 3,409 were male and 3,184 female; children aged 0–6 years numbered 733 (11.1 percent of the population). The recorded sex ratio was 934 females per 1,000 males, compared with the Himachal Pradesh state average of 972.

The overall literacy rate in Nermand in 2011 was 80.9 percent (89.1 percent for males and 72.1 percent for females), slightly lower than the Himachal Pradesh average of 82.8 percent. Residents classified as Scheduled Castes formed about 49.9 percent of the population, while Scheduled Tribes accounted for roughly 0.5 percent.

== Economy ==
Census 2011 data report that 3,445 residents of Nermand were engaged in work or a livelihood activity. Of these workers, 62.8 percent were classified as main workers (employed for more than six months in the year) and 37.2 percent as marginal workers. Among the main workers, 802 were recorded as cultivators (owner or co‑owner of land) and 184 as agricultural labourers. These figures indicate a predominantly agrarian economy centred on terrace farming and orchards, supplemented by small-scale trade and service occupations.

== Transport ==
Nirmand is connected by road to Rampur Bushahr and to other parts of Kullu district. According to 2011 village infrastructure data, the settlement was served by both public and private bus services, while the nearest railway station is approximately 140 kms away in Shimla. Rampur functions as the main market town and access point for higher‑order services for residents of Nirmand and surrounding villages.

== Tourism ==
The concentration of temples, together with surrounding scenery of cultivated terraces and forested ridges, makes Nirmand a modest but growing destination for cultural and religious tourism within Himachal Pradesh. Visitors are attracted by the traditional wooden architecture, village fairs, and views over the Sutlej valley. Homestays and a small Public Works Department rest house provide basic accommodation for travellers.

The village participates in the wider devta (local deity) culture of Kullu district, with ritual calendars tied to agriculture and transhumant pastoralism. Processions (jatra), offerings and oracle traditions associated with the main temples remain central to community life.

Shrikhand Mahadev Yatra is a very popular pilgrimage trek. The trek starts from Jaon village of Nirmand to the peak. It is a 32 km (from one side) trek from base village Jaon to the Shrikhand top which is approximately 18,570 ft above the sea level.

== See also ==
- Kullu district
- Rampur, Himachal Pradesh
