= Om Parvat =

Mountain in the Himalayan mountain range

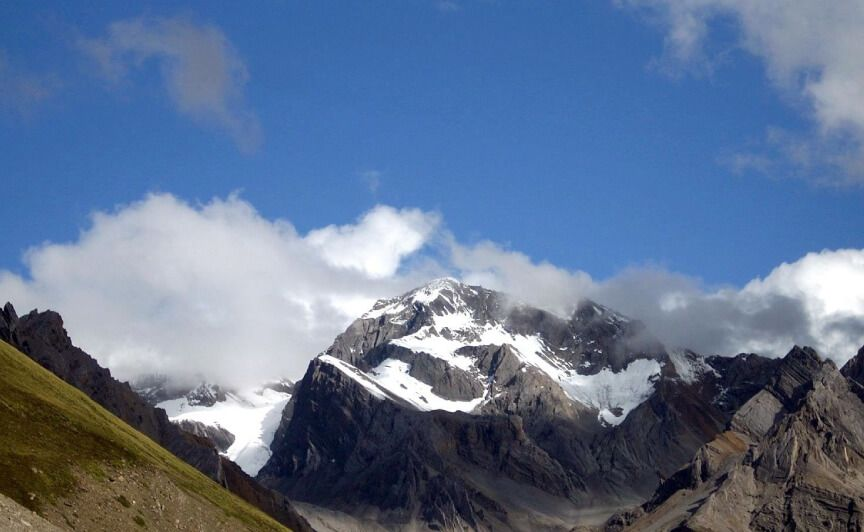
- Om Parvat Mountain, 22 December 2021

Highest point
- Elevation: 5,590 m (18,340 ft)
- Coordinates: 30°11′49″N 81°01′58″E

Geography
- Location within Uttarakhand
- Parent range: Himalayas

Om Parvat is a mountain located on the India–Nepal border between Darchula district, Sudurpashchim Province, Nepal, and the disputed Kalapani territory administered by India within the Pithoragarh district, Uttarakhand. Om Parvat's peak elevation is 5,590 m (18,340 ft) above sea level.

== Snow formation ==
Om Parvat is named for a natural snow deposition pattern on its south-facing rock face that resembles the Devanagari symbol for Om (ॐ). The pattern is formed by the contrast between dark metamorphic rock ridges and accumulated snow in the gullies and depressions between them. The formation's visibility varies by season; it is most clearly defined between late June and October, when partial snowmelt exposes the underlying rock and sharpens the contrast.

== Religious significance ==
The mountain is considered sacred in Hinduism, Buddhism, Jainism and Sikhism. In Hindu tradition, the peak is associated with Shiva and is sometimes described as bearing his signature. The mountain is distinct from Adi Kailash (Jonglingkong Peak), which lies in the nearby Kuthi Valley, though the two are often visited together as part of the same pilgrimage circuit.

== Access ==
Om Parvat lies in a restricted border zone, and an Inner Line Permit is required for access. The primary viewpoint is Nabhidhang, a high-altitude camp at approximately 4,266 m (13,996 ft), from which the Om formation is visible on clear days. The mountain is situated along the route to Lipulekh Pass and is visible to pilgrims on the Kailash Mansarovar Yatra. The nearest town is Dharchula, from which the route proceeds through Gunji to Nabhidhang.

The ridge dividing the watershed of the Kali River and the Tinkar Khola runs in a southwesterly direction from the China-India-Nepal tri-junction area at Om Parvat. Under the 1961 Sino-Nepalese Boundary Treaty, the demarcated China–Nepal border begins from the point where this ridge meets the ridge dividing the watershed between the tributaries of the Mapchu (Karnali) River and the Tinkar River, then runs southeastwards through the Tinkar Pass to Urai Pass. Kelirong is a mountain along this north-eastern ridge, overlooking the Kali River gorge near Gunji; its upper part is marked as Byans Rikhi and its lower part as Kourtekh. The name Byans Rikhi derives from Vyasa (Vyāsa-deva), the sage traditionally credited with authoring the Mahabharata; the regional name Byans itself is considered a modern form of the Sanskrit name Vyāsa.

== See also ==
- Gunji, Uttarakhand
- Om beach
- Panch Kailash, lit. "Five Kailashas" referring to five scared mountains named Kailash
- Sri Kailash, sixth mountain named Kailash which in not among the Panch Kailash.
