= Gunji, Uttarakhand =

Gunji
- Village
- Location within Uttarakhand
- Coordinates: 30°11′12″N 80°51′03″E
- Country: India
- State: Uttarakhand
- District: Pithoragarh

Area
  - Total: 189 km^{2} (73 sq mi)
- Elevation: 3,200 m (10,500 ft)

Population (2011)
  - Total: 335
  - Density: 1.77/km^{2} (4.59/sq mi)
- Demonym: Byansi

Languages
  - Official: Hindi
- Time zone: UTC+5:30 (IST)
- Vehicle registration: UK
- Website: www.india.gov.in

Gunji is a small village in Uttarakhand, India. It is close to the border of India with Tibet (China) and Nepal, near the confluence of the Kuthi Yankti and Kalapani River, at the east end of the Kuthi Valley. The village is on the traditional Indian route to Kailas–Manasarovar.

== Demographics ==
As per the 2011 census, the village of Gunji has a population of 335 people living in 194 households.

The village is only populated seasonally, with winters coming people migrate to lower places (mostly to Dharchula, in the same district).

Indian border security forces belonging to Sashastra Seema Bal, the Indo-Tibetan Border Police and General Reserve Engineer Force remain stationed in Gunji throughout the year.

== Transport ==
=== Air ===
Helicopter service to Gunji is available from Dharchula, started in 2014.

Gunji Airport, with 1000 m airstrip, was announced/proposed in 2025 by the Chief Minister of Uttarakhand to cater to the pilgrims to Kailash-Mansarovar Yatra.

=== Road ===
While approaching Gunji from south from Dharchula-Pithoragarh and the rest of India, the route along the western bank of Sharda River (also called Mahakali River) near southeast of Gunji forks into two separate motorable routes, first route PLPH (KMR) goes northeast to Om Parvat, Lipulekh Pass and Kailash Mansarovar and second route GLDPR goes northwest to Gunji, Kuti Valley, Adi Kailash and Lampiya Dhura Pass.

Pithoragarh-Lipulekh Pass Highway (PLPH) or Kailash-Mansarovar Road (KMR), part of Kailash Mansarovar yatra route, is nearly 350 km long 2-lane paved-shoulder highway which passes through Pithoragagh, Dharchula, Budhi, Garbyang, east of Gunji, ITBP camp, Nabidhang and Lipulekh Pass on India-Tibet border (under geostrategic India-China Border Roads project) to the Kailas-Manasarovar. In May 2023, the road has been 2-laned and blacktopped except the under-construction formation-cutting work on the last 5 km from the Kumaon Mandal Vikas Nigams' (KMVN) tourist huts to Lipulekh pass which will take 100 days to complete, and the route between Budi to Garbyang is single lane as the detail project report (DPR) for the Rs 2,000-crore 6 km long 2-lane tunnel is being prepared which will be ready by May 2024 and construction will commence in 4 to 5 years time. Southwest spur from Nabidhang runs along a glaciated river to Om Parvat.

Gunji-Lampiya Dhura Pass Road (GLDPR) runs through Kuti Valley from Gunji, via Adi Kailash, to Lampiya Dhura Pass (Limpiyadhura Pass on India-China border). After it was constructed in July 2020, it has reduced the trek time to Adi Kailash to two hours.

== See also ==
- Geography of Uttarakhand
- Tourism in Uttarakhand
- Kalapani territory
- Lipulekh Pass
