= Dharchula =

- Hill Town
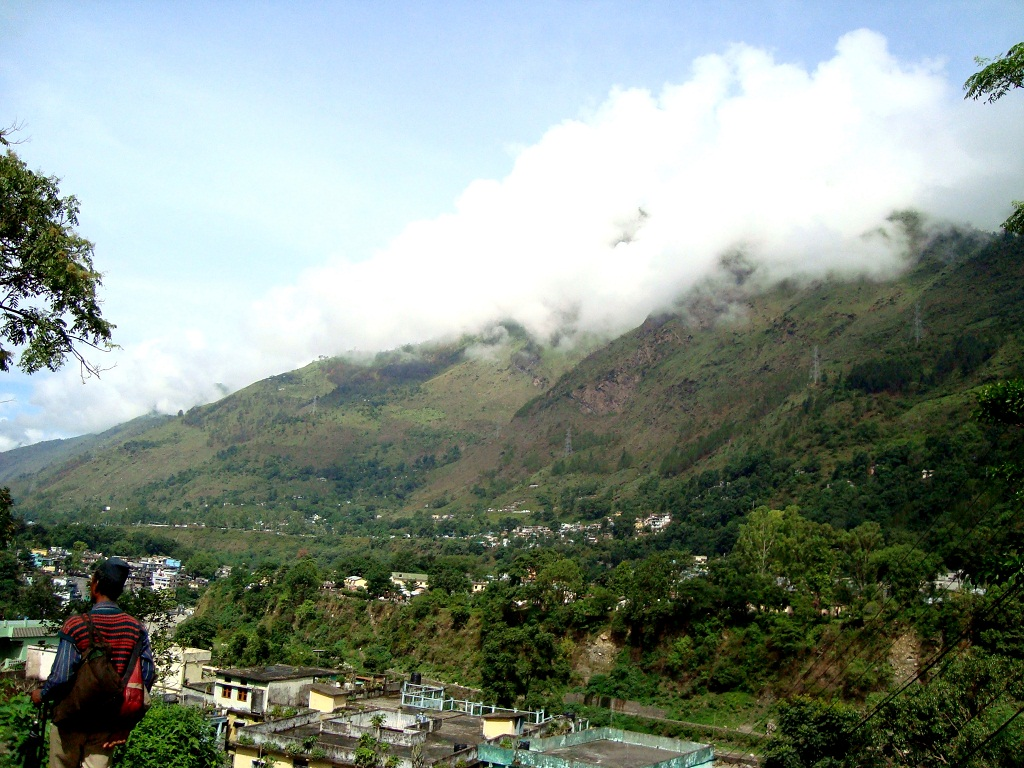
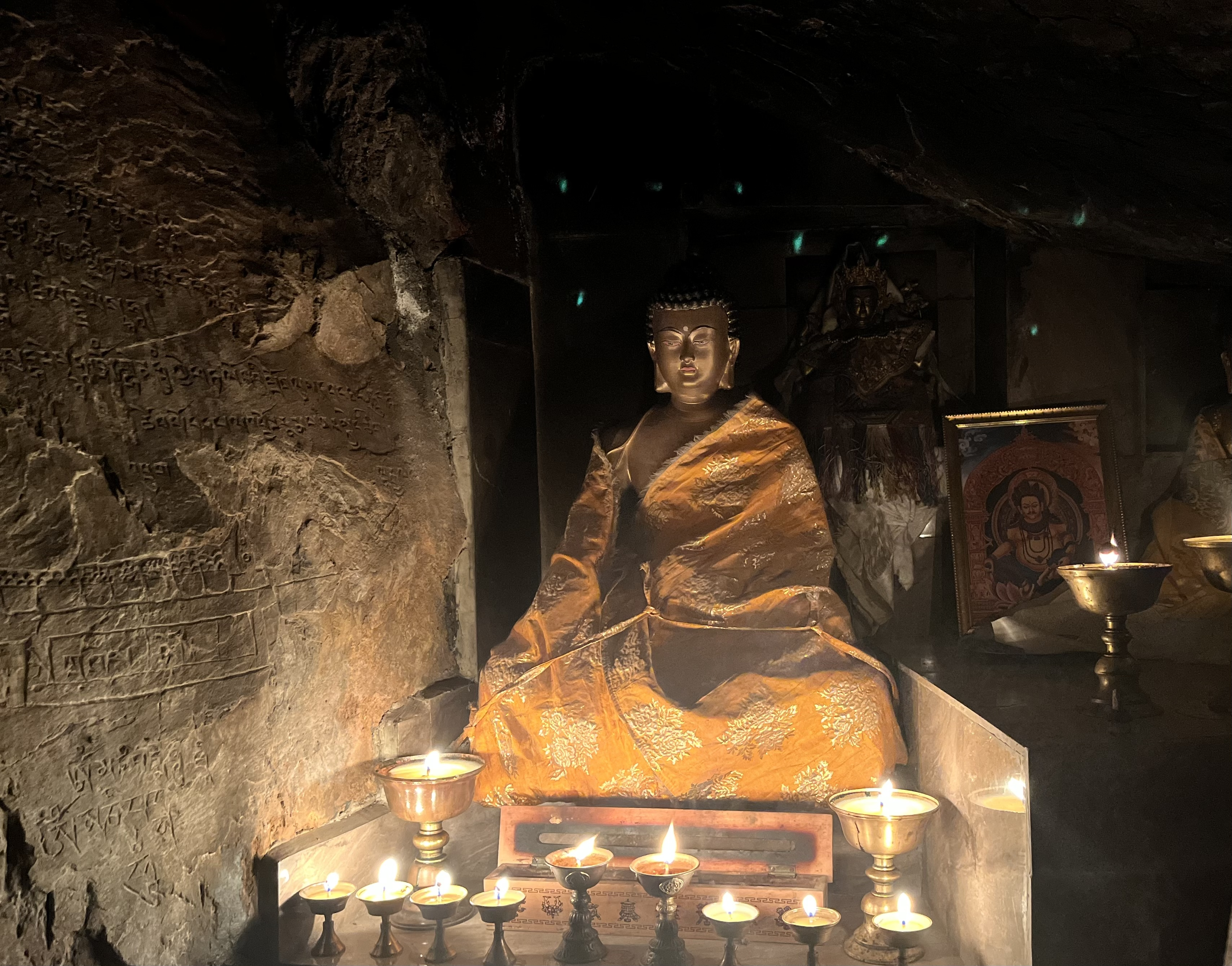
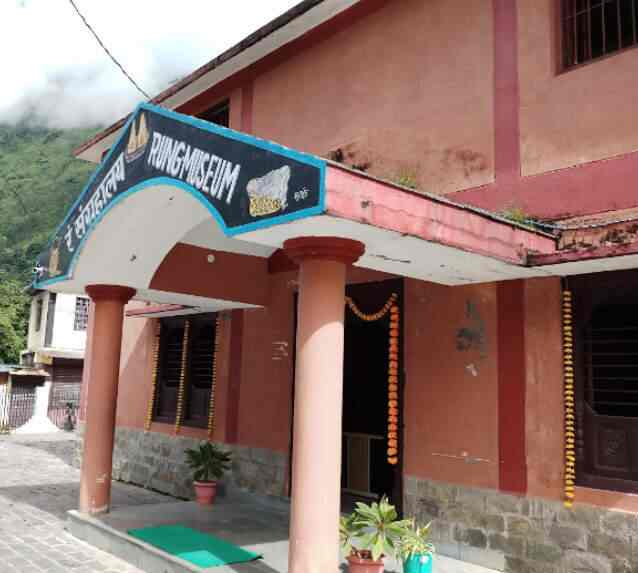
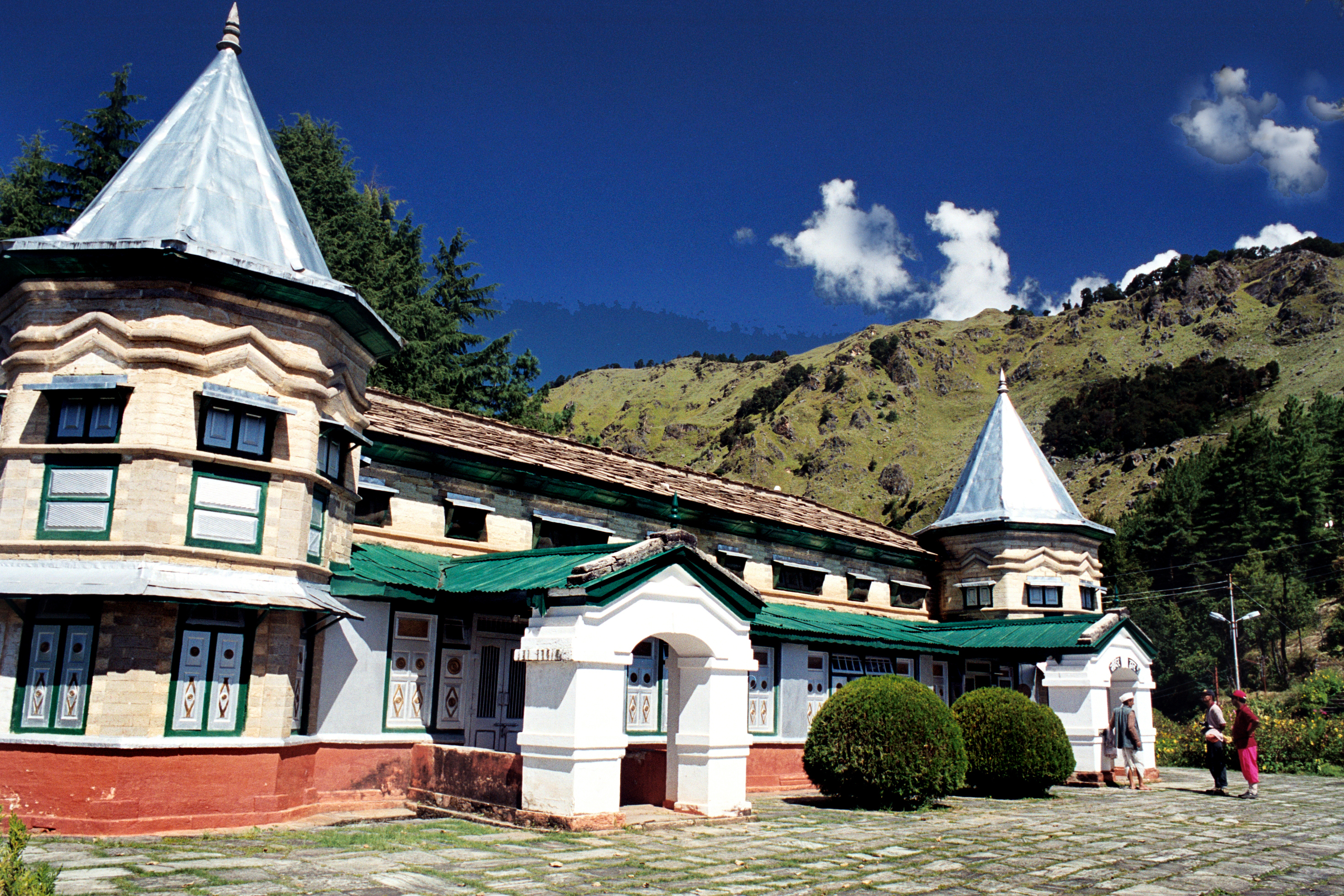
- Clockwise from top : View of mountains from Dharchula, Rung Museum, Narayan Ashram and Buddha Cave.

- Location in Uttarakhand Dharchula (India)
- Coordinates: 29°50′54.6″N 80°32′34.8″E
- Country: India
- State: Uttarakhand
- Division: Kumaon
- District: Pithoragarh

Government
  - Type: Assembly constituency
  - Body: Dharchula Assembly constituency
  - Chairperson: Sashi Thapa (INC)
  - MLA: Harish Singh Dhami (INC)
  - Lok Sabha MP: Ajay Tamta (BJP)
- Elevation: 940 m (3,080 ft)

Population (2011)
  - Total: 7,039
- Demonym: Dharchullya

Languages
  - Official: Hindi, Sanskrit
  - Native: Dharchuleli Kumaoni, Rung Lo, Dharchuleli Dotyali
- Time zone: UTC+5:30 (IST)
- PIN: 262545
- Vehicle registration: UK-05
- Website: uk.gov.in

Dharchula (In Kumaoni: Dhàrchulà, धार्चुलऻ), is a town in the Pithoragarh district of Uttarakhand, India. It is located at an elevation of about 940 metres (3,080 ft) above sea level and is surrounded by high Himalayan peaks. The Mahakali River flows through the town, dividing it into two settlements situated on either bank—one in India and the other in Nepal. Residents on both sides of the border share close cultural, linguistic, and social ties, reflecting a long-standing common heritage. Local people are permitted to cross the river without passports or visas, facilitating interaction and trade. The population of the area includes Khas, Kumaoni, Dotyali, and Rung communities, contributing to its diverse cultural traditions. Dharchula is situated approximately 92 kilometres (57 mi) north of Pithoragarh, the district headquarters. It lies on the Pithoragarh–Lipulekh Pass Highway (PLPH) and falls along the route of the Kailash Mansarovar Yatra, a significant pilgrimage in Hinduism, Buddhism, and Jainism. Dharchula offers panoramic views of the Panchachuli peaks to its west and lies on several trekking routes in the region.

== Etymology ==
Dharchula is derived from two words: “Dhar” (धार), meaning edge or peak in the local Dharchuleli Kumaoni dialect, and “Chula” (चुला), meaning fire stove. Literally, the name refers to a fire stove made of three stones, which was traditionally used for cooking in this region. Almost every household once relied on such three-stone stoves. The name also reflects the geography of Dharchula, where mountain peaks resemble a three-stone fire stove. According to legend, sage Vyasa cooked his meals here on such a stove formed by three peaks during his journey to Mount Kailash.

According to other legend Dharchula gets its name from ‘Darchyo’ and ‘la’; Darchyo is a white coloured traditional holy flag and la is an honorific term in Rung languages.

== Demographics ==
As of 2011, the population of Dharchula Nagar Palika (municipality) was 7,039 (3,797 males and 3,242 females), with a female sex ratio of 854 compared to the state average of 963. Children of 0–6 years represent 12.64% of the population with a child sex ratio of 824 compared to the Uttarakhand state average of 890. The literacy rate of Dharchula city is 88.68%, higher than the state average of 78.82%; literacy in males is around 95.10% and in females, it stands at 81.20%.

== History ==
Dharchula was an ancient trading town on the Trans-Himalayan trade routes. It was also halting place for the migrating tribals of the valleys' above i.e. Darma and Byans. People of Chaundas hardly migrated as the weather was much bearable unlike the other two valleys. Trade was based on barter system and was the only source of income for the inhabitants of Dharchula. Local handicrafts like carpets which are known here as ‘dan’, were exchanged with the Tibetans for food and clothing.

After the Indo-China War in 1962, all trading ties with the Tibetans came to a stop which caused innumerable hardships to the people of Dharchula. The difficulty forced people to look for alternate means of earnings. Soon the locals engaged themselves in farming, small businesses and cattle farming. With government intervention, good tourism facilities have developed in the town.

== Things to do from Dharchula ==
The following are some major attractions and activities around Dharchula:

Visit Adi Kailash (Chhota Kailash). Adi Kailash is a sacred mountain, also known as Chhota Kailash, due to its resemblance to Mount Kailash in Tibet. It can be reached via Gunji and Jyolingkong with special permits. The site is considered highly sacred for devotees of Lord Shiva.

Explore Om Parvat. Om Parvat is a mountain in the Himalayas known for a snow formation that resembles the Hindu sacred symbol Om (ॐ). It is regarded as sacred site and can be viewed from Nabhidhang area along the Kailash Mansarovar pilgrimage route

Narayan Ashram. Narayan Ashram is a peaceful spiritual retreat located at around 14,000 ft altitude. Established in 1936, it provides free food and accommodation for pilgrims and travelers surrounded by scenic Himalayan landscapes.

Trekking and Hiking. The region offers several trekking opportunities including routes such as Dharchula to Narayan Ashram, trekking to Gunji and expeditions toward Kalapani and Lipulekh Pass (subject to permission). These routes offer challenging Himalayan terrain and scenic beauty.
