= Shailyashikhar =

Shailyashikhar शैल्यशिखर
- Municipality
- Location within Sudurpashchim Province Location within Nepal
- Coordinates: 29.39°N 80.31°E
- Country: Nepal
- Province: Sudurpashchim
- District: Darchula
- No. of wards: 9
- Established: 2017
- Incorporated (VDC): Sikhar, Dethala, Ranisikhar, Gwani, Boharigau and Gokuleshwar

Government
  - Type: Mayor–council
  - Body: Shailyashikhar Municipality

Area
  - Total: 117.81 km^{2} (45.49 sq mi)

Population (2011)
  - Total: 22,060
  - Households: 4,021
- Time zone: UTC+05:45 (NPT)
- Main Language(s): Doteli, Nepali
- Website: www.shailyashikharmun.gov.np

Shailyashikhar Municipality is a municipality located in Darchula District of Sudurpashchim Province of Nepal.

The municipality was established on 10 March 2017, when Government of Nepal announced 744 local level units as per the new constitution of Nepal 2015. Sikhar, Dethala, Ranisikhar, Gwami, Boharigau and Gokuleshwar villages were merged to form this new local level unit. Gokuleshwar was declared the admin headquarters. Total population of the municipality is (2011 Nepal census) 22060 and total area of the municipality is 117.81 square kilometres (45.49 sq mi). The municipality is divided into total 9 wards.
