= Khar, Nepal =

Khar खार
- Village development committee
- Location in Nepal
- Coordinates: 29.79°N 80.64°E
- Country: Nepal
- Zone: Mahakali Zone
- District: Darchula District

Population (2011)
  - Total: 4,272
- Time zone: UTC+5:45 (Nepal Time)

Khar (Nepali: खार) is a village development committee (VDC) of Darchula District in the Mahakali Zone of Far-Western Development Region, Nepal. Geographically khar is located 29.79 N and 80.64 E, its nearest border to the district headquarters is Dallekh which is 10- 12 kilometer north east to the Darchula. The Khar VDC is surrounded by Sipti and Dhuligada VDC to the East and South, Katai to the West, and Eyarkot to the North. According to national census 2011 khar VDC has total population 4,272 (2,056 male and 2,216 female) residing 698 households.

== Villages of Khar VDC ==
1. Dallekh
2. Chaurigau
3. Godhani, Kakanadi, Chaud
4. Saalimaad
5. Khupuligau,
6. Jamir
7. Sundmund
