= Dilendra Prasad Badu =

Nepalese politician

Honourable Dilendra Prasad Badu MP
- दिलेन्द्र प्रसाद बडू
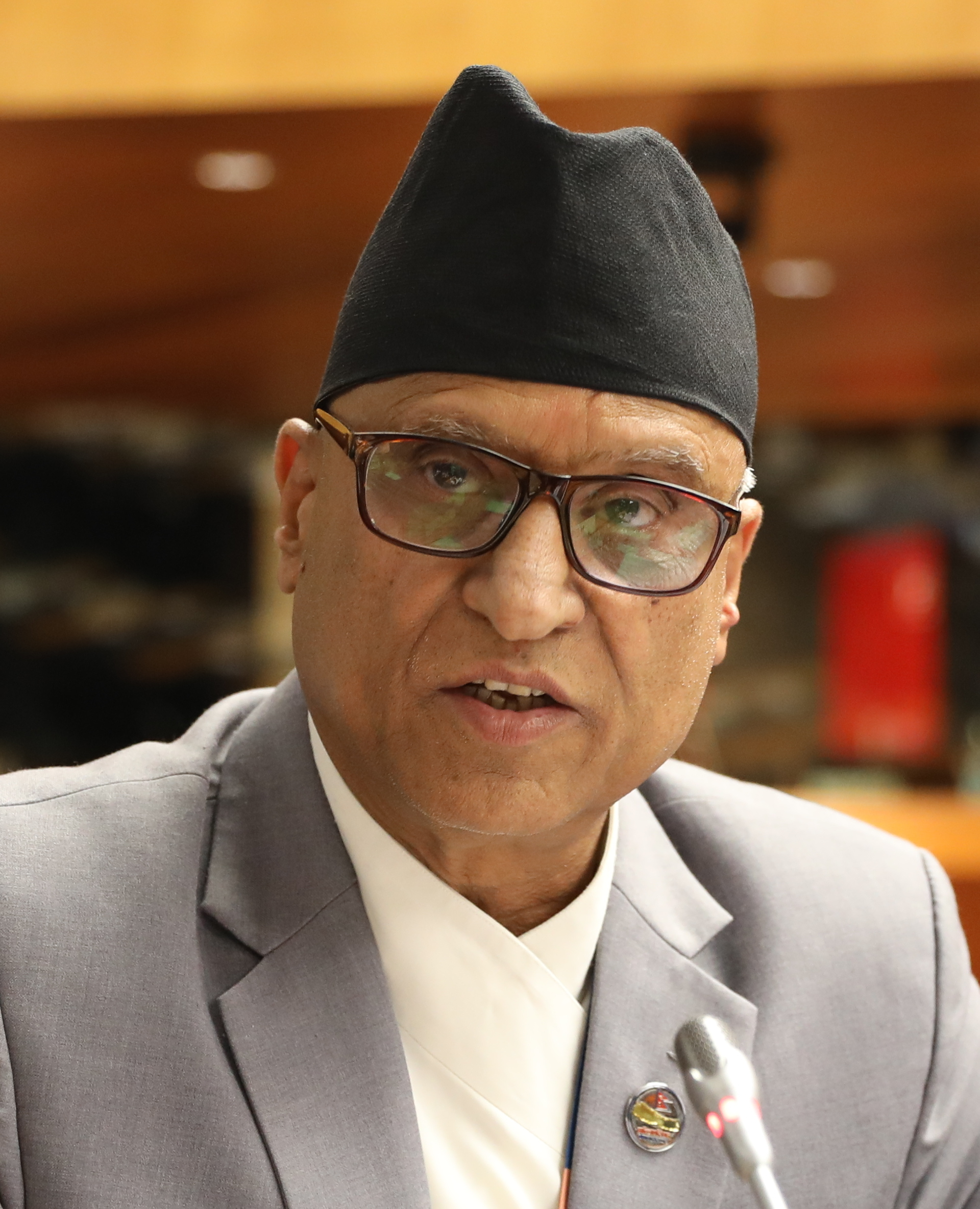
- Badu in 2022

Minister of Industry, Commerce and Supplies
- In office 8 October 2021 – 26 December 2022
- President: Bidya Devi Bhandari
- Prime Minister: Sher Bahadur Deuba
- Preceded by: Sher Bahadur Deuba as Prime Minister
- Succeeded by: Damodar Bhandari

Member of Parliament, Pratinidhi Sabha
- In office 22 December 2022 – 12 September 2025
- Preceded by: Ganesh Singh Thagunna
- Succeeded by: Ganesh Singh Thagunna (elect)
- Constituency: Darchula 1
- In office 28 April 2006 – 16 January 2008
- Preceded by: Himself (2002)
- Succeeded by: Laxman Dutta Joshi (as Member of the Constituent Assembly)
- Constituency: Darchula 1
- In office May 1999 – May 2002
- Preceded by: Prem Singh Dhami
- Succeeded by: Himself (2006)
- Constituency: Darchula 1
- In office May 1991 – August 1994
- Preceded by: Constituency established
- Succeeded by: Prem Singh Dhami
- Constituency: Darchula 1

Member of Parliament, Pratinidhi Sabha for Nepali Congress party list
- In office 4 March 2018 – 18 September 2022

Personal details
- Born: 9 January 1954 (age 72) Darchula District
- Party: Nepali Congress
- Spouse: Madhavi Badu
- Children: 3
- Parents: Nandi Badu (father); Kalasha Devi Badu (mother)
- Website: Official website

Dilendra Prasad Badu is a Nepalese politician who has served as the Minister for Law, Justice and Parliamentary Affairs of Nepal since 2021. Elected through a proportional election system, he is currently serving as a Member of Parliament in the Nepali House of Representatives from Darchula and he is currently in its Parliamentary Committee for State Affairs and Good Governance. He was previously elected to the Pratinidhi Sabha in the 1999 election on behalf of the Nepali Congress.

D. P. Badu has been a member of the central working committee for Nepali Congress since 2003, having been appointed for 2 tenure and elected for another 2 tenures. He also served as spokesperson of the party from 2010 to 2016. He has been Member of Parliament four times and minister thrice so far.

He started active politics in 1989, as a secretary of Nepali Congress, District Committee, Darchula. Before coming into active politics, he worked as a teacher in secondary school of Darchula (1977-1979), and as a faculty member and campus chief for Mahendra Multiple Campus, Nepalgunj, Banke, Tribhuvan University (1981-1990).

In the 2022 Nepalese general election, he was elected as the member of the 2nd Federal Parliament of Nepal.
