= Darchula 1 =

Parliamentary constituency in Nepal

- Parliamentary constituency for the House of Representatives
- Darchula 1 in Sudurpashchim Province; Protected areas in green

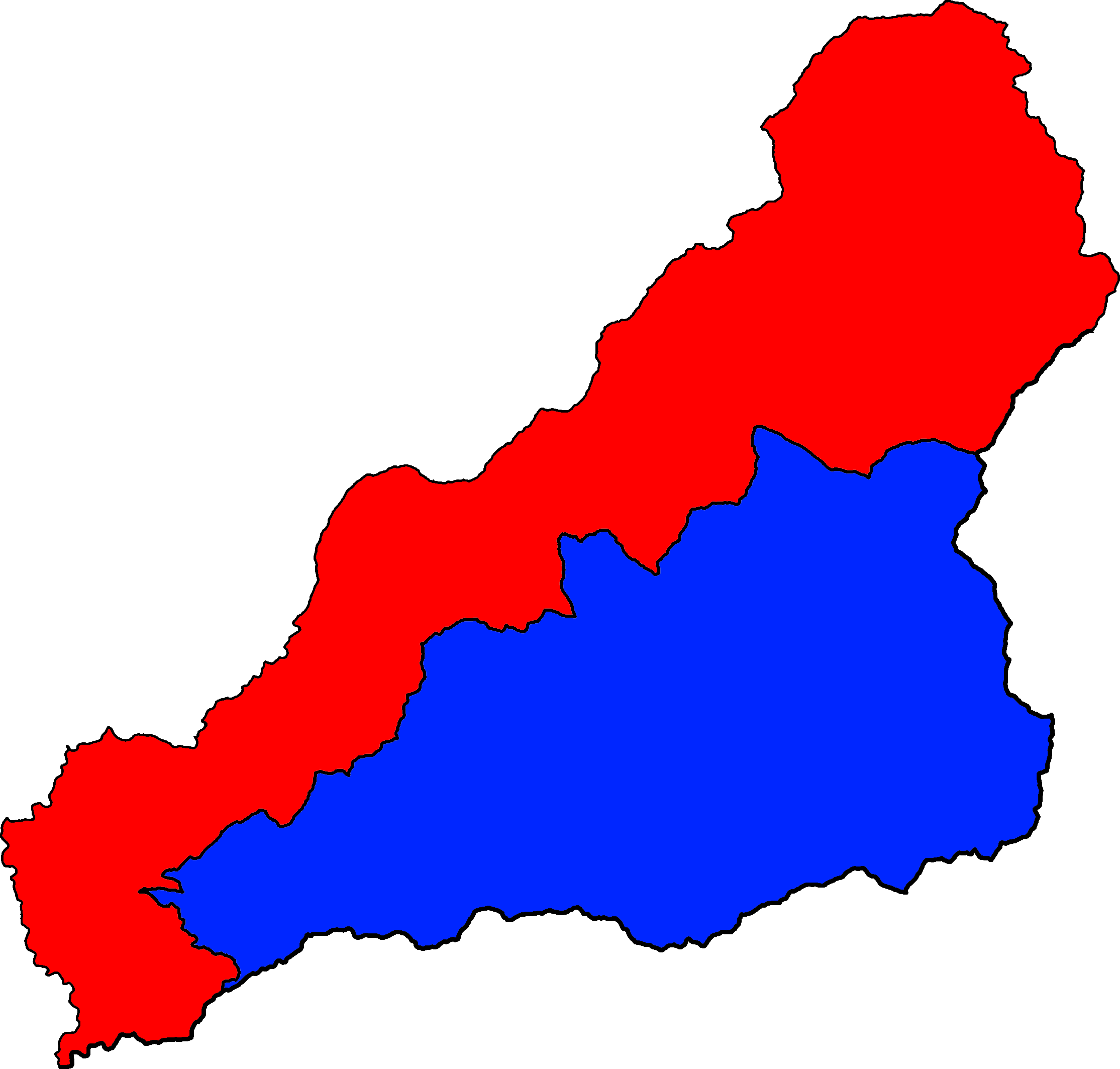
- Assembly segments Darchula 1(A) (red) and Darchula 1(B) (blue) within Darchula District
- Province: Sudurpashchim Province
- District: Darchula District
- Electorate: 78,513

Current constituency
- Created: 1991
- Party: Nepali Congress
- MP: Dilendra Prasad Badu
- Sudurpashchim MPA 1(A): Gelbu Singh Bohora (NCP)
- Sudurpashchim MPA 1(B): Man Bahadur Dhami (NCP)

Darchula 1 is the parliamentary constituency of Darchula District in Nepal. This constituency came into existence on the Constituency Delimitation Commission (CDC) report submitted on 31 August 2017.

== Incorporated areas ==
Darchula 1 incorporates the entirety of Darchula District.

== Assembly segments ==
It encompasses the following Sudurpashchim Provincial Assembly segment

- Darchula 1(A)
- Darchula 1(B)

== Members of Parliament ==
=== Parliament/Constituent Assembly ===
Election	Member	Party
1991	Dilendra Prasad Badu	Nepali Congress
1994	Prem Singh Dhami	CPN (Unified Marxist–Leninist)
1999	Dilendra Prasad Badu	Nepali Congress
2008	Laxman Dutta Joshi	CPN (Maoist)
January 2009	Laxman Dutta Joshi	UCPN (Maoist)
2013	Ganesh Singh Thagunna	CPN (Unified Marxist–Leninist)
May 2018	Ganesh Singh Thagunna	Nepal Communist Party
March 2021	Ganesh Singh Thagunna	CPN (Unified Marxist–Leninist)
2022	Dilendra Prasad Badu	Nepali Congress

=== Provincial Assembly ===
==== 1(A) ====
Election	Member	Party
2017	Gelbu Singh Bohora	CPN (Unified Marxist-Leninist)
May 2018	Gelbu Singh Bohora	Nepal Communist Party

==== 1(B) ====
Election	Member	Party
2017	Man Bahadur Dhami	CPN (Maoist Centre)
May 2018	Man Bahadur Dhami	Nepal Communist Party

== Election results ==
=== Election in the 2020s ===
==== 2022 general election ====
Candidate	Party	Votes	%
Dilendra Prasad Badu	Nepali Congress	28,515	51.17
Ganesh Singh Thagunna	CPN (UML)	26,381	47.34
Others		827	1.48
Total		55,723	100.00
Majority		2,134	
Nepali Congress gain			

=== Election in the 2010s ===
==== 2017 legislative elections ====
Party	Candidate	Votes
CPN (Unified Marxist–Leninist)	Ganesh Singh Thagunna	28,998
Nepali Congress	Bikram Singh Dhami	22,233
Others		969
Invalid votes		2,347
Result	CPN (UML) hold	
Source: Election Commission

==== 2017 Nepalese provincial elections ====
===== 1(A) =====
Party	Candidate	Votes
CPN (Unified Marxist-Leninist)	Gelbu Singh Bohora	16,073
Nepali Congress	Madan Giri	12,598
Others		496
Invalid votes		1,053
Result	CPN (UML) gain	
Source: Election Commission

===== 1(B) =====
Party	Candidate	Votes
CPN (Maoist Centre)	Man Bahadur Dhami	12,956
Nepali Congress	Jagadish Bahaur Pal	9,575
Others		799
Invalid votes		993
Result	Maoist Centre gain	
Source: Election Commission

==== 2013 Constituent Assembly election ====
Party	Candidate	Votes
CPN (Unified Marxist–Leninist)	Ganesh Singh Thagunna	20,470
Nepali Congress	Dilendra Prasad Badu	19,236
UCPN (Maoist)	Lalit Singh Thagunna	9,017
Others		2,239
Result	CPN (UML) gain	
Source: NepalNews

=== Election in the 2000s ===
==== 2008 Constituent Assembly election ====
Party	Candidate	Votes
CPN (Maoist)	Laxman Dutta Joshi	25,404
CPN (Unified Marxist–Leninist)	Ganesh Singh Thagunna	12,813
Nepali Congress	Dilendra Prasad Badu	12,599
Rastriya Prajatantra Party	Bhawan Singh Kunwar	2,001
Others		805
Invalid votes		2,329
Result	Maoist gain	
Source: Election Commission

=== Election in the 1990s ===
==== 1999 legislative elections ====
Party	Candidate	Votes
Nepali Congress	Dilendra Prasad Badu	22,379
CPN (Unified Marxist–Leninist)	Bir Bahadur Thagunna	16,656
Rastriya Prajatantra Party (Chand)	Pratap Ram Lauhar	3,232
CPN (Marxist–Leninist)	Kirti Chand Thakur	2,920
Others		654
Invalid votes		528
Result	Congress gain	
Source: Election Commission

==== 1994 legislative elections ====
Party	Candidate	Votes
CPN (Unified Marxist–Leninist)	Prem Singh Dhami	15,708
Nepali Congress	Dilendra Prasad Badu	11,611
Rastriya Prajatantra Party	Indra Bahadur Bam	5,747
Independent	Akbar Bahadur Singh	2,308
Independent	Kirti Chandra Thakur	2,179
Others		164
Result	CPN (UML) gain	
Source: Election Commission

==== 1991 legislative elections ====
Party	Candidate	Votes
Nepali Congress	Dilendra Prasad Badu	9,678
CPN (Democratic)		3,641
Result	Congress gain	

== See also ==
- List of parliamentary constituencies of Nepal
