= Duhun Rural Municipality =

Duhun दुहुँ गाउँपालिका
- Rural Municipality
- Location of rural council
- Coordinates: 29.90°N 80.63°E
- Country: Nepal
- Province: Sudurpashchim
- District: Darchula
- Wards: 5
- Established: 10 March 2017

Government
  - Type: Rural Council
  - Chairperson: Mr. Narendra Bahadur Singh Badal
  - Vice-chairperson: Mrs. Shanti Devi Bam

Area
  - Total: 65.35 km^{2} (25.23 sq mi)

Population (2011)
  - Total: 10,818
  - Density: 165.5/km^{2} (428.7/sq mi)
- Time zone: UTC+5:45 (Nepal Standard Time)
- Area code: 0
- Headquarter: Hikila
- Website: Official Website

Duhun (Nepali: दुहुँ) is a rural council located in Darchula District of Sudurpashchim province in Nepal.

Total area of the rural municipality is 65.35 square kilometres (25.23 sq mi) and total population is 10818 individuals.

The rural council was formed on 10 March 2017, when Government of Nepal announced 753 local level units as per the new constitution of Nepal 2015. thus the rural municipality came into existence. The rural council was formed merging following former VDCs: Hikila, Pipalchauri and Dhari. Some part (Ward No. 1, 2 & 3 of Previous Api Municipality was also merged in this rural council, remaining wards of Api municipality was merged in Mahakali Municipality) The rural council is divided into 5 wards and the admin center of the rural council is located at Hikila (ward no. 2)
