= Chaurigau =

Village in Sudurpashchim Province, Nepal

Coordinates: 27°21′N 85°37′E

Chaurigau चौरीगाउँ is a small village of Khar VDC of Darchula District of Sudurpashchim Province Nepal. Chaurigau commonly known as Chaukhutte shares border with Dallekh village in the Western and Kaknadi, Godhani, and Ubdhaar in the Eastern, Southern and Northern respectively.
