= Dallekh =

Village in Nepal

Coordinates: 29°47′26″N 80°37′46″E

Dallekh is a small village of Khar village Development committee of Darchula and resides in 85 households. Dallekh is the nearest border village of Khar VDC to the district headquarters, which is 10–12 km northeast from Darchula Khalanga.

The natural environment of this village attracts a number of internal tourists every year. In Dallekh there is a small town called Vinayak which has a local shopping center, tea shops and small lodges. Views of the Himalayas can be observed from Vinayak. Dallekh is also one of the gateways to the Api Nampa Conservation Area.

== Climate ==
The climate of this village is tropical to sub-tropical, and the temperature ranges between 30·c in the summer to the freezing cold in the winter. In the month of November to January Dallekh is covered with snow. Because of the climate, Dallekh is rich in biodiversity. The vegetation in the local forest, called Thaam, includes lower and upper sub-alpine forest (pine, oak, and rhododendron). Local farmers cultivate potato, barley, maize, and wheat as main crops in different seasons.

== Demographics ==
The population of Dallekh is composed by Chhetri and Dalit. Major casts of the village are: Manyal, Sitoli, Dobal, Mahar, Tamata, Bisht,(parki) Dadal, Bohara and Thagunna. The majority of the population depends on agriculture for their income, however, the old trend is changing and people are now joining government jobs and going abroad for a better life. The literacy rate of Dallekh is 70% which is just above the national average but, female literacy rate is poor.

=== Religion ===
Most of the people of Dallekh follow Hinduism and people worship different deities. The main deities are Daadaabaag, Chhipla Kedaar, Bhumme dewataa, Bashdhaara and Bhaaraani (Jaldewataa). Some government offices are located in Dallekh Vinayak to provide government services to the local people of Dallekh and surrounding villages of Khar VDC. The forestry office Dallekh, Khar, Police post Dallekh, Khar and Tham Community Forest Committee, Panidhara Primary School, Dallekh, are the main government bodies established here.
