= Ganesh Singh Thagunna =

Nepali politician

Honourable Ganesh Singh Thagunna
- गणेश सिंह ठगुन्ना
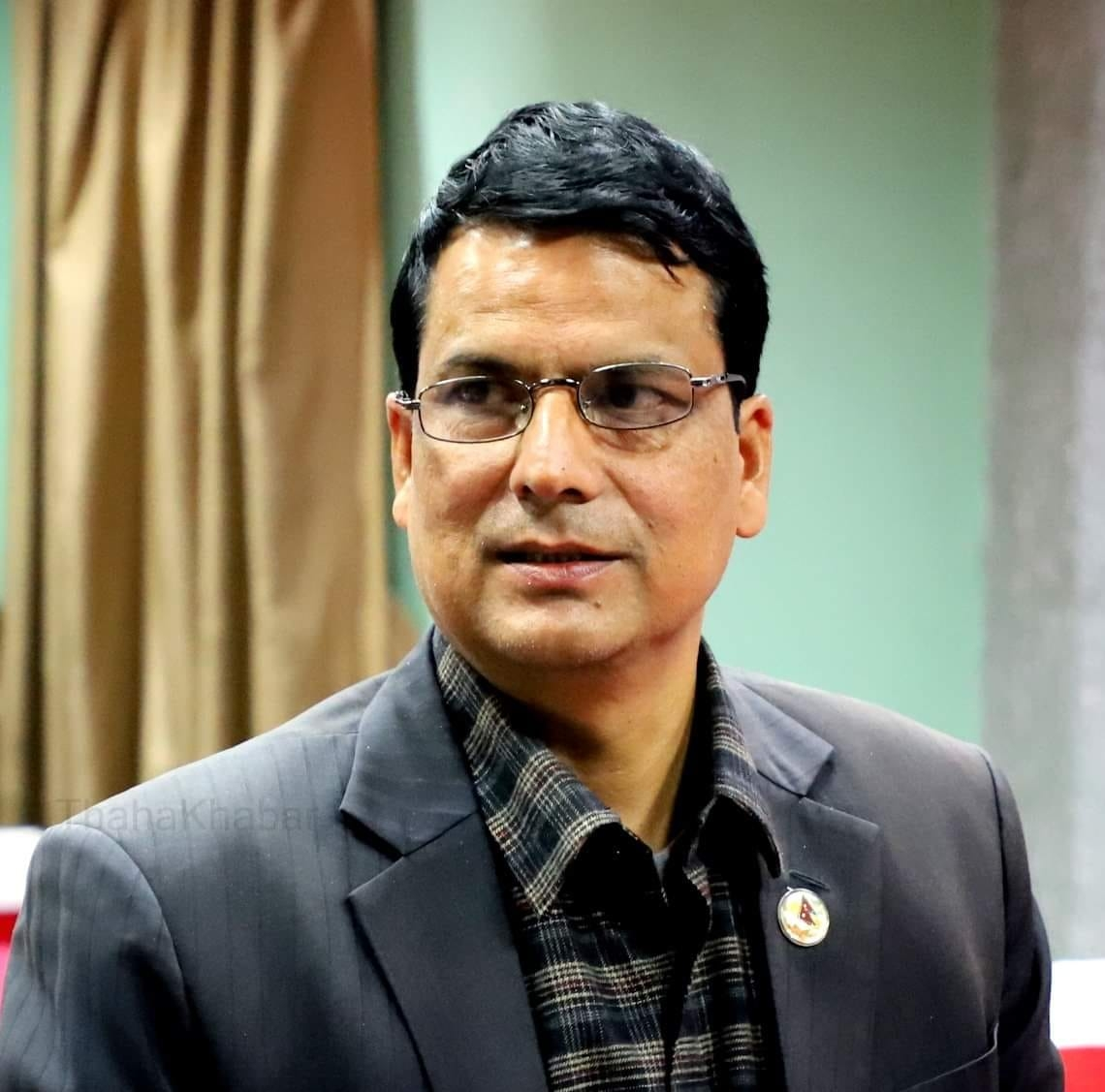

Minister of Federal Affairs and General Administration of Nepal
- In office 25 December 2020 – 4 June 2021
- President: Bidya Devi Bhandari
- Prime Minister: K. P. Sharma Oli
- Preceded by: Hridayesh Tripathi
- Succeeded by: Ganesh Kumar Pahadi

Member of Parliament, Pratinidhi Sabha
- Assuming office TBD
- Succeeding: Dilendra Prasad Badu
- Constituency: Darchula 1
- In office 4 March 2018 – 18 September 2022
- Preceded by: Himself as (MCA)
- Succeeded by: Dilendra Prasad Badu
- Constituency: Darchula 1

Member of the Constituent Assembly
- In office 21 January 2014 – 14 October 2017
- Preceded by: Laxman Dutta Joshi
- Succeeded by: Himself as (MP)
- Constituency: Darchula 1

Personal details
- Born: 7 December 1968 (age 57) Darchula District
- Party: CPN UML
- Children: 3

Honorable Ganesh Singh Thagunna(Elected From Darchula 2026 MP )(born 7 December 1968) is a Nepali politician and former Minister of Federal Affairs and General Administration .He is a member of the House of Representatives of the federal parliament of Nepal. Previously, he was also elected to the 2nd constituent assembly in 2013. He is a long time member of CPN UML. He is from Darchula District, where he won both the 2013 and 2017 elections from Darchula 1 (constituency).

== Political career ==
Thagunna started his political career, joining CPN UML in 1990. He served as Darchula district secretary for the party three times. He also became a member of the Mahakali zone coordination committee of the party. Following the formation of Nepal Communist Party (NCP) in 2018, he became the district incharge of Darchula for the party.

In the local level elections of 1997, he was elected the chairperson of Darchula District Development Committee.

In the 2013 elections to the 2nd constituent assembly, he was elected from Darchula constituency under the first-past-the-post system.

In the 2017 parliamentary elections, he again won from Darchula constituency under the first-past-the-post system, defeating his nearest rival, Bikram Singh Dhami of Nepali Congress. He received 28,998 votes to Dhami's 22,233. Following his election, he is also serving as the member of the State Direction Principle, Rules and Responsibility Committee as well as the Women and Social Welfare Committee of parliament. He is also a member of Constitution Implementation and Monitoring Committee, the joint parliamentary committee.

== Personal life ==
Thagunna was born to Kalawati Devi Thagunna and her husband Prem Singh, on 7 December 1968, in Khalanga-1 of Darchula district. He has a graduate degree in Science.

== Electoral history ==
2017 House of Representatives Election

Darchula 1 (constituency)

Party	Candidate	Votes	Status
CPN (UML)	Ganesh Singh Thagunna	28,998	Elected
Nepali Congress	Bikram Singh Dhami	22,233	Lost

2013 Constituent Assembly election

Darchula 1 (constituency)

Party	Candidate	Votes	Status
CPN (UML)	Ganesh Singh Thagunna	20,470	Elected
Nepali Congress	Dilendra Prasad Badu	19,236	Lost

2008 Nepalese Constituent Assembly election

Darchula 1 (constituency)

Party	Candidate	Votes	Status
CPN (Maoist)	Laxman Dutta Joshi	25,404	Elected
CPN UML	Ganesh Singh Thagunna	12,813	Lost
