= Dadakot =

Village development committee in Mahakali Zone, Nepal

Dadakot डाँडाकोट
- Village development committee
- Location in Nepal
- Coordinates: 29.70°N 80.41°E
- Country: Nepal
- Zone: Mahakali Zone
- District: Darchula District

Population (1991)
  - Total: 1,871
- Time zone: UTC+5:45 (Nepal Time)

Dadakot is a village development committee in Darchula District in the Mahakali Zone of western Nepal. At the time of the 1991 Nepal census it had a population of 1871 people living in 327 individual households.
