= Bhagawati, Darchula =

Bhagawati भगवती
- Village Development Committee
- Location in Nepal
- Coordinates: 29°45′38″N 80°27′18″E
- Country: Nepal
- Province: Sudurpashchim Province
- District: Darchula District

Population (1991)
  - Total: 2,454
- Time zone: UTC+5:45 (Nepal Time)

Bhagawati is a Village Development Committee located in the Darchula District in the Sudurpashchim Province of western Nepal. At the time of the 1991 Nepal census it had a population of 2454 people residing in 435 individual households.
