= Naugadh, Darchula =

Naugadh Naugarh
- Gaunpalika
- Country: Nepal
- Province: Sudurpashchim Province
- District: Darchula district

Naugadh is a former village development committee that is now a part of Naugad Rural Municipality in Darchula District in Sudurpashchim Province of western Nepal.

The area is prone to flooding. Six homes were destroyed during the flash floods on July 12, 2018, triggered by heavy rains. No casualties were reported but a power station of Godhani Khola Small Hydropower Project at Naugadh-1 was damaged.
