= Khandeshwari =

Khandeshwari खाँडेश्वरी
- Village development committee
- Location in Nepal
- Coordinates: 29.81°N 80.96°E
- Country: Nepal
- Zone: Mahakali Zone
- District: Darchula District

Population (1991)
  - Total: 1,917
- Time zone: UTC+5:45 (Nepal Time)

Khandeshwari is a village development committee in Darchula District in the Mahakali Zone of western Nepal. At the time of the 1991 Nepal census it had a population of 1917 people living in 297 individual households.
