= Rithachaupata =

Rithachaupata रिठ्ठा चौपाटा
- Village development committee
- Location in Nepal
- Coordinates: 29.68°N 80.50°E
- Country: Nepal
- Zone: Mahakali Zone
- District: Darchula District

Population (1991)
  - Total: 3,864
- Time zone: UTC+5:45 (Nepal Time)

Rithachaupata is a village development committee in Darchula District in the Mahakali Zone of western Nepal. At the time of the 1991 Nepal census it had a population of 3864 people living in 691 individual households.

Lekam is a Rural Municipality in Darchula District in the mahakali zone of western Nepal.
