= Dhap =

Dhap धाप
- Location in Nepal
- Coordinates: 29.78°N 80.51°E
- Country: Nepal
- Zone: Mahakali Zone
- District: Darchula District

Population (2021)
  - Total: 1,443
- Time zone: UTC+5:45 (Nepal Time)

Dhap is a market center in Mahakali Municipality in Darchula District in the Mahakali Zone of western Nepal. The formerly Village Development Committee was merged to form new municipality since 18 May 2014. At the time of the 2021 Nepal census it had a population of 1443 people living in 325 individual households. The major ethnic group living in Dhap are Brahmins and Chhetris with the majority of Bista (Brahmin), Joshi, Bhatta, Pant, Raikhola caste. Temple of God Malikarjun and Temple of God Latinath are two main religious sites. The main educational institute is Malikarjun Secondary School, where one can study up to Undergraduate level from Elementary Level.

The settlement of village of Dhap can be compared to a small valley. It is situated on the bank of Mahakali River with high hills around it. Thaligad, one of the major streams in the district flows through the heart of Dhap. The staple food is bhat (steamed rice) and dal (cereals and pulses) or palyau (cereal paste cooked with diluted yoghurt). One can also enjoy the fresh water fish found in the Mahakali River. The village is independent in terms of agricultural production. Irrigation from Thaligad, the local river, helps peoples grow ample amount of crops for consumption.
