= Gulijar =

Coordinates: 29°44′N 80°51′E

Guljar गुल्जर Gholjar
- Village development committee
- Guljar
- Nickname: घोल्जर
- Interactive map of Guljar
- Country: Marma VillageNepal
- Zone: Mahakali Zone
- District: Darchula District

Government

Population (1991)
  - Total: 2,970
- Time zone: UTC+5:45 (Nepal Time)

Guljar is a village development committee in Darchula District in the Mahakali Zone of western Nepal. At the time of the 1991 Nepal census it had a population of 2970 people living in 485 individual households.
