= Tapoban =

Tapoban तपोवन
- Village
- Location in Nepal
- Coordinates: 29.76°N 80.79°E
- Country: Nepal
- Zone: Mahakali Zone
- District: Darchula District

Population (1991)
  - Total: 1,841
- Time zone: UTC+5:45 (Nepal Time)

Tapoban is a village in Darchula District in the Mahakali Zone of western Nepal. At the time of the 1991 Nepal census it had a population of 1841 people living in 305 individual households.

Formerly, Tapoban was a village development committee (VDC), which were local-level administrative units. In 2017, the government of Nepal restructured local government in line with the 2015 constitution and VDCs were discontinued.
