= Sitaula =

Sitaula सितौला
- Village development committee
- Location in Nepal
- Coordinates: 29.84°N 80.78°E
- Country: Nepal
- Zone: Mahakali Zone
- District: Darchula District

Population (2011)
  - Total: 3,536
- Time zone: UTC+5:45 (Nepal Time)

Sitaula is a village development committee in Darchula District in the Mahakali Zone of western Nepal. At the time of the 2011 Nepal census it had a population of 3536 people living in 557 individual households.
