= Kante, Nepal =

Kante काँटे
- Location in Nepal
- Coordinates: 29.81°N 80.61°E
- Country: Nepal
- Zone: Mahakali Zone
- District: Darchula District

Population (1991)
  - Total: 2,865
- Time zone: UTC+5:45 (Nepal Time)

Kante is a market center in Api Municipality in Darchula District in the Mahakali Zone of western Nepal. The formerly Village Development Committee was merged to form new municipality since 18 May 2014. At the time of the 1991 Nepal census it had a population of 2865.
