= Datu, Nepal =

Coordinates: 29°46′N 80°24′E

Dattu दत्तु
- Ward 9, Mahakali Municipality
- Interactive map of Dattu
- Country: Nepal
- Province: Sudurpashchim Province
- District: Darchula District

Population (1991)
  - Total: 1,832
- Time zone: UTC+5:45 (Nepal Time)

Dattu is a place that belongs to Ward No 9 of Mahakali Municipality in Darchula District in Sudurpashchim Province of western Nepal. At the time of the 1991 Nepal census, it was a village development committee (Note: The VDC structure was dissolved in 2017.) and had a population of 1832 people living in 344 individual households.

It consists of 9 sub regions: Sakar, Thapala, Mali Dattu, Bait, Ulaini, Tali Dattu, Udyai, Kholi, Chuchai. The south part borders with India across the Mahakali River, and the Indian markets Baluwakot and Ghatiwagad are connected by a hanging bridge. The cultural relationship with India has also strengthened the ties among both countries' residents.
