= Mahakali, Darchula =

Mahakali महाकाली
- Municipality
- Location in Sudurpashchim Mahakali (Nepal)
- Coordinates: 29.814°N 80.55°E
- Country: Nepal
- Province: Sudurpashchim
- District: Darchula
- No. of wards: 9
- Established: 18 June 2014
- Incorporated (VDC): Dattu
- Incorporated (date): 10 March 2017

Government
  - Type: Mayor–council
  - Body: Mahakali Municipality
  - Mayor: Mr. Hansraj Bhatta
  - Deputy Mayor: Mrs. Suna Bohara
  - MP & Constituency: Darchula 1 Ganesh Singh Thagunna (NCP)
  - MLA & Constituency: Darchula 1(A); Gelbu Singh Bohara (NCP)

Area
  - Total: 135.11 km^{2} (52.17 sq mi)

Population (2011)
  - Total: 21,231
- Time zone: UTC+05:45 (NPT)
- Website: mahakalimundarchula.gov.np

Mahakali (Nepali: महाकाली) is a municipality located in Darchula District of Sudurpashchim Province of Nepal.

The municipality was established on 18 May 2014 named "Api Municipality" merging the former village development committees of: Brahmadev, Chhapari, Dhap, Kante and Khalanga. The total area of "Api municipality" had 1,314 square kilometres (507 mi^{2}) and it had a total population of 20,797 people.

Fulfilling the requirement of the new Constitution of Nepal 2015, all old municipalities and villages (which were more than 3900 in number) were restructured into 753 new units, thus this municipality upgraded into Mahakali municipality

On 10 March 2017, during upgradation of Api municipality a small portion of this municipality (ward 1, 2 & 3) excluded from it and Dattu Village development committee merged to it and renamed as Mahakali municipality. Now total area of the municipality has 135.11 square kilometres (52.17 mi^{2}) and total population of it is 21231 people, the municipality is divided into total 9 wards.

== Divisions ==
Mahakali is divided into nine wards:

Divisions
Ward No.	Neighborhood	Area (km^{2})	Pop. 2011	Pop. 2021
1	Chhapari	19.12	2822	2519
2	Sella	15.07	2048	1759
3	Baan	20.25	2180	1686
4	Khalanga	2.86	4282	6020
5	Galfai	18.14	2807	5336
6	Nisil	23.09	1539	1204
7	Dhap	15.52	1354	1443
8	Assigada	10.81	2013	2077
9	Dattu	10.26	2186	2031
	Total	135.11	21231	24081

== Demographics ==
The total population of Mahakali municipality in 2021 has been slightly increased compared to 2011 Nepal census. According to the 2021 Nepal census, there are 24081 people living here in 5982 households. The number of males comprises 11457 while females are 12624.

Ethnically Chettri is the largest group in this municipality following Bahun second largest and Bishwakarma third largest.

Religiously Hindu is the largest group with 99.4% and Buddhist is the second largest group with 0.2%, Islam at third number with 0.1%.

Ethnic groups according to (2021)
1. Chhetri (62.5%)
2. Bahun (16.7%)
3. Bishwakarma (11.2%)
4. Byansi/Sauka (2.70%)
5. Thakuri (4.40%)
6. Magar (0.70%)
7. Pariyar (0.90%)
8. Mijar (0.60%)
9. Tamang (0.10%)
10. Others (0.20%)

Religious group
	percentage
Hindu	99.4%
Buddhist	0.2%
Islam	0.1%
Others	0.3%

82.9% of the population are literate which means they can read and write but only 7% of people have passed SLC.

Education
	percentage
Basic	4.9%
primary	25.9%
secondary	38.8%
SEE	7%%
10+2	14.2%
Graduate & above	7.2%
