= Malikarjun Rural Municipality =

Malikarjun Rural Municipality मालिकार्जुन गाउँपालिका
- Rural Municipality
- मालिकार्जुन गाउँपालिका Malikarjun Rural Municipality (Nepal)
- Coordinates: 29.733°N 80.4365°E
- Country: Nepal
- Province: Sudurpashchim Province
- District: Darchula District

Government
  - Type: Local government
  - Chairperson: Hira Singh Dhami
  - Administrative Head: Jay Singh Dhami

Area
  - Total: 100.82 km^{2} (38.93 sq mi)

Population (2011 census)
  - Total: 15,581
  - Density: 154.54/km^{2} (400.26/sq mi)
- Time zone: UTC+05:45 (Nepal Standard Time)
- Website: http://malikarjunmun.gov.np

Malikarjun (Nepali: मालिकार्जुन) is a Gaupalika in Darchula District in the Sudurpashchim Province of far-western Nepal. Malikarjun has a population of 15581. The land area is 100.82 km^{2}. It was formed by merging Malikarjun, Dadakot, Uuku, Bhagwati, Hunainath and Shankarpur VDCs.
