= Shyam Kumar Ghimire =

Nepalese politician

Honourable Shyam Kumar Ghimire
- श्‍याम कुमार घिमिरे

Member of Parliament, Pratinidhi Sabha
- In office 22 December 2022 – 12 September 2025
- Succeeded by: Dhanendra Karki
- Constituency: Sindhuli 1

Personal details
- Born: 16 March 1964 (age 62) Mahottari District
- Party: Nepali Congress
- Spouse: Rama Ghimire
- Parent: Indra Prasad Ghimire (father)
- Education: Tribhuwan University

Shyam Kumar Ghimire is a Nepalese politician, belonging to the Nepali Congress and served as a member of the 2nd Federal Parliament of Nepal. In the 2022 Nepalese general election, he won the election from Sindhuli 1 (constituency).
