= Dethala =

Village development committee in Mahakali Zone, Nepal

Dethala देथला
- Village development committee
- Location in Nepal
- Coordinates: 29.71°N 80.62°E
- Country: Nepal
- Zone: Mahakali Zone
- District: Darchula District

Population (1991)
  - Total: 3,155
- Time zone: UTC+5:45 (Nepal Time)

Dethala is a village development committee in Darchula District in the Mahakali Zone of western Nepal. At the time of the 1991 Nepal census it had a population of 3155 people living in 507 individual households.

Dethala is a small Himalayan town surrounded by Naugarh Gad river which is a major tributary of the Chemeliya River. Dethala was ruled by a branch of Katyuri kings. After the breakdown of Katyuri Dynasty, King Abhay Pal of Askot, the grandson of Katyuri King, Brahm Deo, brought a branch of Katyuri Dynasty, here as the Pal Thakuri to Dethala. The Pal Rajwar's latter ruled this area for ages.
