= Gokuleshwar, Darchula =

Town in Mahakali Zone, Nepal. Located at the bank of holy Chameliya River

Coordinates: 29°39′N 80°31′E

Gokuleshwar गोकुलेश्वर
- Town
- Interactive map of Gokuleshwar
- Country: Nepal
- Zone: Mahakali Zone
- District: Darchula District

Population (1991)
  - Total: 2,694
- Time zone: UTC+5:45 (Nepal Time)

Gokuleshwar is a village development committee in Darchula District in the Mahakali Zone of western Nepal. At the time of the 1991 Nepal census it had a population of 2694 people living in 486 individual households.
