= Gwami =

Coordinates: 29°43′N 80°32′E

Gwani ग्वानी
- Village development committee
- Interactive map of Gwani
- Country: Nepal
- Zone: Mahakali Zone
- District: Darchula District

Population (1991)
  - Total: 3,361
- Time zone: UTC+5:45 (Nepal Time)

Gwani is a village development committee in Darchula District in the Mahakali Zone of western Nepal. At the time of the 1991 Nepal census it had a population of 3361 people living in 550 individual households.
