= Dhanendra Karki =

Nepalese politician

The Honourable Dhanendra Karki
- धनेन्द्र कार्की

Member of Parliament, Pratinidhi Sabha
- Incumbent
- Assumed office 26 March 2026
- Preceded by: Shyam Kumar Ghimire
- Constituency: Sindhuli 1

Personal details
- Citizenship: Nepalese
- Party: Rastriya Swatantra Party
- Profession: Politician

Dhanendra Karki (Nepali: धनेन्द्र कार्की) is a Nepalese politician serving as a member of parliament from the Rastriya Swatantra Party. He is the member of the 7th Pratinidhi Sabha elected from Sindhuli 1 constituency in 2026 Nepalese General Election securing 16,659 votes and defeating his closest contender Pradip Kumar Katwal of the CPN UML.

== Legal Issues ==
On 17 March 2026, CPN-UML candidate Pradip Kumar Katuwal filed a petition against Karki, claiming that Karki was listed as a defaulter four times and remained blacklisted as a promoter-director of credit firm Biju Cooperative, until February 2026, but concealed this information while filing his candidacy for 2026 General Election. On 8 April 2026, Supreme court noted that the defendant had already taken the oath as MP, and the case will proceed to a final hearing after written responses are submitted.

== Electoral performance ==
Election	Year	Constituency	Contested for	Political party	Result	Votes	% of votes	Ref.
Nepal general election	2026	Sindhuli 1	Pratinidhi Sabha member	Rastriya Swatantra Party	Won	16,659	29.22%	
