= Sikhar =

Sikhar शिखर
- Village development committee
- Location in Nepal
- Coordinates: 29.70°N 80.66°E
- Country: Nepal
- Zone: Mahakali Zone
- District: Darchula District

Population (1991)
  - Total: 2,085
- Time zone: UTC+5:45 (Nepal Time)

Sikhar is a village development committee in Darchula District in the Mahakali Zone of western Nepal. At the time of the 1991 Nepal census it had a population of 2085 people living in 376 individual households.
