= Boharigau =

Village development committee in Sudurpashchim Province, Nepal

Boharigau बोहरीगाउँ
- Village development committee
- Location in Nepal
- Coordinates: 29.70°N 80.51°E
- Country: Nepal
- Province: Sudurpashchim Province
- District: Darchula District

Population (1991)
  - Total: 3,262
- Time zone: UTC+5:45 (Nepal Time)

Boharigau is a village development committee in Darchula District in Sudurpashchim Province of western Nepal. At the time of the 1991 Nepal census it had a population of 3262 people living in 572 individual households.
