= Sindhuli 1 =

Parliamentary constituency in Bagmati Province, Nepal

- Parliamentary constituency
- Sindhuli 1 in Bagmati Province
- Province: Bagmati Province
- District: Sindhuli District

Current constituency
- Created: 1991
- Party: Rastriya Swatantra Party
- Member of Parliament: Dhanendra Karki

Sindhuli 1 is one of two parliamentary constituencies of Sindhuli District in Nepal. This constituency came into existence on the Constituency Delimitation Commission (CDC) report submitted on 31 August 2017.

== Incorporated areas ==
Sindhuli 1 parliamentary constituency incorporates Golanjor Rural Municipality, Phikkal Rural Municipality, Tinpatan Rural Municipality, Dudhauli Municipality, and wards 9, 13 and 14 of Kamalamai Municipality.

== Assembly segments ==
It encompasses the following Bagmati Provincial Assembly segment

- Sindhuli 1(A)
- Sindhuli 1(B)

== Members of Parliament ==
=== Parliament/Constituent Assembly ===
Election	Member	Party
1991	Madan Dhungel	CPN (Unified Marxist–Leninist)
1994	Bipin Koirala	Nepali Congress
1999	Ganga Prasad Nepal	CPN (Unified Marxist–Leninist)
2008	Bishma Lal Adhikari	CPN (Unified Marxist–Leninist)
2013	Ganesh Kumar Pahadi	CPN (Unified Marxist–Leninist)
May 2018	Ganesh Kumar Pahadi	Nepal Communist Party
March 2021	Ganesh Kumar Pahadi	CPN (Unified Marxist–Leninist)
2022	Shyam Kumar Ghimire	Nepali Congress
2026	Dhanendra Karki	Rastriya Swatantra Party

=== Provincial Assembly ===
==== 1(A) ====
Election	Member	Party
2017	Lekh Nath Dahal	CPN (Maoist Centre)
May 2018	Lekh Nath Dahal	Nepal Communist Party

==== 1(B) ====
Election	Member	Party
2017	Pradeep Kumar K.C.	CPN (Unified Marxist–Leninist)
May 2018	Pradeep Kumar K.C.	Nepal Communist Party

== Election results ==
=== Election in the 2020s ===
==== 2022 general election ====
Candidate	Party	Votes	%
Shyam Kumar Ghimire	Nepali Congress	30,391	50.30
Pradeep Kumar Katuwal Kshetri	CPN (UML)	25,546	42.28
Menuka Thakuri	Rastriya Swatantra Party	2,692	4.46
Others		1,791	2.96
Total		60,420	100.00
Majority		4,845	
Nepali Congress gain			

=== Election in the 2010s ===
==== 2017 legislative elections ====
Party	Candidate	Votes
CPN (Unified Marxist–Leninist)	Ganesh Kumar Pahadi	32,529
Nepali Congress	Prem Chandra Dahal	22,389
Others		2,243
Invalid votes		3,658
Result	CPN (UML) gain	
Source: Election Commission

==== 2017 Nepalese provincial elections ====
===== Sindhuli 1(A) =====
Party	Candidate	Votes
CPN (Maoist Centre)	Lekh Nath Dahal	16,524
Nepali Congress	Ganga Prasad Giri	11,009
Others		1,331
Invalid votes		1,606
Result	Maoist Centre gain	
Source: Election Commission

===== Sindhuli 1(B) =====
Party	Candidate	Votes
CPN (Unified Marxist–Leninist)	Pradeep Kumar K.C.	16,612
Nepali Congress	Shyam Kumar Ghimire	11,955
Others		751
Invalid votes		944
Result	CPN (UML) gain	
Source: Election Commission

==== 2013 Constituent Assembly election ====
Party	Candidate	Votes
CPN (Unified Marxist–Leninist)	Ganesh Kumar Pahadi	10,901
UCPN (Maoist)	Lekh Nath Dahal	8,926
Nepali Congress	Bipin Koirala	7,956
Federal Socialist Party, Nepal	Buddha Raj Rai	1,387
CPN (United)	Govinda Bahadur Karki	1,012
Others		1,283
Result	CPN (UML) hold	
Source: NepalNews

=== Election in the 2000s ===
==== 2008 Constituent Assembly election ====
Party	Candidate	Votes
CPN (Unified Marxist–Leninist)	Bishma Lal Adhikari	12,058
CPN (Maoist)	Shanti Man Karki	11,801
Nepali Congress	Binod Kumar Guru	9,000
Others		1,690
Invalid votes		1,228
Result	CPN (UML) hold	
Source: Election Commission

=== Election in the 1990s ===
==== 1999 legislative elections ====
Party	Candidate	Votes
CPN (Unified Marxist–Leninist)	Ganga Prasad Nepal	15,158
Nepali Congress	Komal Bahadur Karki	12,695
CPN (Marxist–Leninist)	Khadga Bahadur Sunuwar	2,828
Others		610
Invalid Votes		37
Result	CPN (UML) gain	
Source: Election Commission

==== 1994 legislative elections ====
Party	Candidate	Votes
Nepali Congress	Bipin Koirala	12,688
CPN (Unified Marxist–Leninist)	Shanti Man Karki	11,838
Others		929
Result	Congress gain	
Source: Election Commission

==== 1991 legislative elections ====
Party	Candidate	Votes
CPN (Unified Marxist–Leninist)	Madan Dhungel	9,986
Nepali Congress	Arjun Baral	9,217
Result	CPN (UML) gain	

== See also ==
- List of parliamentary constituencies of Nepal
