= Eyarkot =

Eyarkot इयरकोट
- Village development committee
- Location in Nepal
- Coordinates: 29.83°N 80.69°E
- Country: Nepal
- Zone: Mahakali Zone
- District: Darchula District

Population (2011)
  - Total: 133,274
- Time zone: UTC+5:45 (Nepal Time)

Eyarkot is a village development committee in Darchula District in the Mahakali Zone of western Nepal. At the time of the 1991 Nepal census it had a population of 1448 people living in 239 individual households.
