= Kharkada =

Kharkada खरकादा
- Village development committee
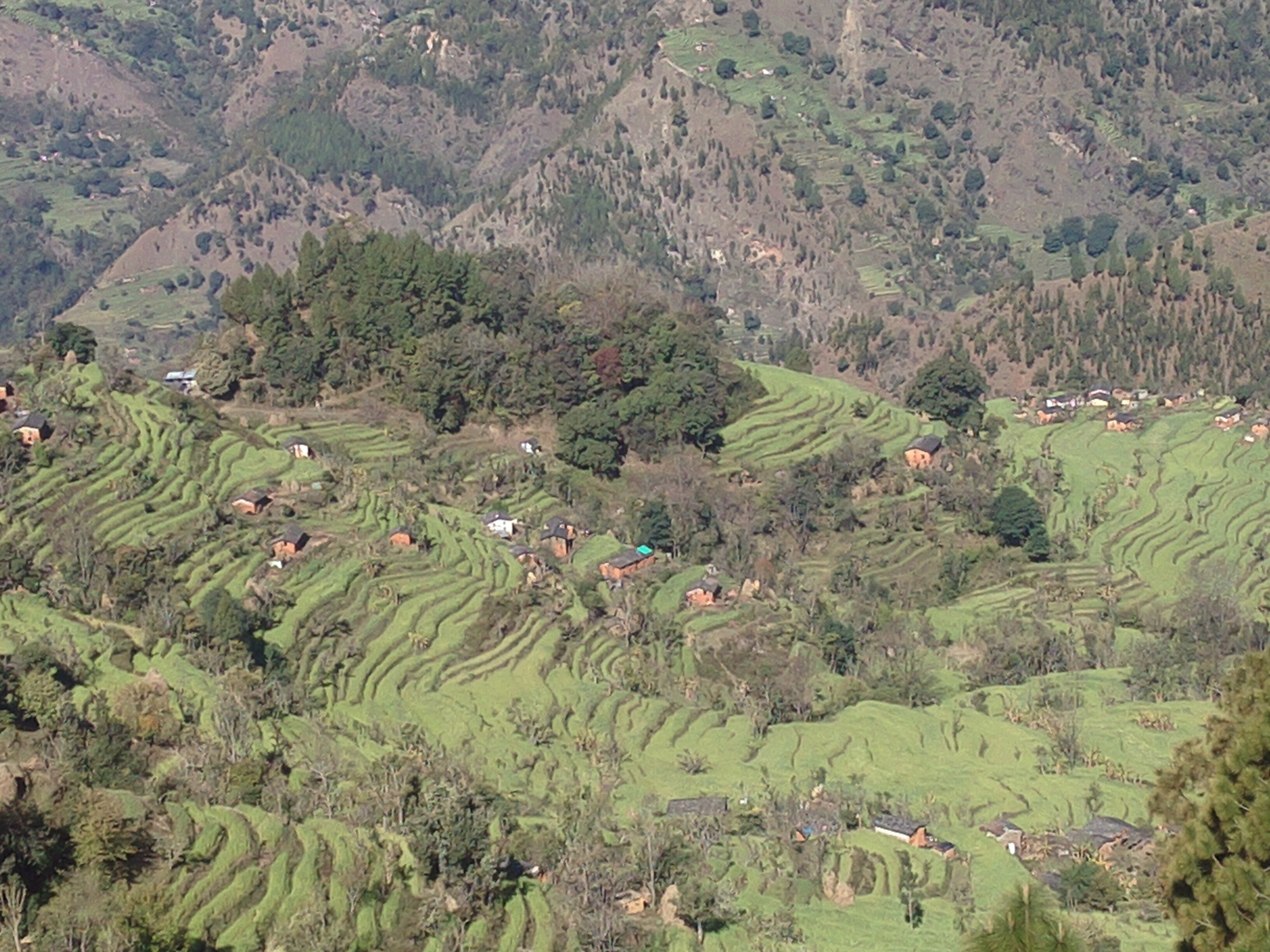
- Landscape near Kharkada, Darchula

- Location in Nepal
- Coordinates: 29.68°N 80.45°E
- Country: Nepal
- Zone: Mahakali Zone
- District: Darchula District

Population (1991)
  - Total: 2,591
- Time zone: UTC+5:45 (Nepal Time)

Kharkada is a village development committee in Darchula District in the Mahakali Zone of western Nepal. At the time of the 1991 Nepal census it had a population of 2591 people living in 473 individual households.
