= Ganesh Kumar Pahadi =

Nepalese Politician

- गणेश कुमार पहाडी

Minister of Federal Affairs and General Administration
- In office 10 June 2021 – 22 June 2021
- President: Bidya Devi Bhandari
- Prime Minister: KP Sharma Oli
- Preceded by: Ganesh Singh Thagunna

Member of Parliament, Pratinidhi Sabha
- In office 4 March 2018 – 18 September 2022
- Preceded by: Himself as (MCA)
- Constituency: Sindhuli 1

Member of Constituent Assembly
- In office 21 January 2014 – 14 October 2017
- Preceded by: Bishma Lal Adhikari
- Succeeded by: Himself as (MP)
- Constituency: Sindhuli 1

Personal details
- Born: 23 June 1970 (age 55)
- Party: CPN (UML)
- Other political affiliations: CPN (ML)

Ganesh Kumar Pahadi is a Nepalese Politician and was Minister of Federal Affairs and General Administration. He was serving as the Member Of House Of Representatives (Nepal) elected from Sindhuli-1, Province No. 3. He is member of the Communist Party of Nepal (UML).
