= Pipalchauri =

Pipalchauri पीपलचौरी
- Village development committee
- Location in Nepal
- Coordinates: 29.92°N 80.62°E
- Country: Nepal
- Zone: Mahakali Zone
- District: Darchula District

Population (1991)
  - Total: 1,854
- Time zone: UTC+5:45 (Nepal Time)

Pipalchauri is a village development committee in Darchula District in the Mahakali Zone of western Nepal. At the time of the 1991 Nepal census it had a population of 1854 people living in 293 individual households.
