= Hikila =

Hikila हिकिला
- Village development committee
- Location in Nepal
- Coordinates: 29.90°N 80.63°E
- Country: Nepal
- Zone: Mahakali Zone
- District: Darchula District

Population (1991)
  - Total: 2,321
- Time zone: UTC+5:45 (Nepal Time)

Hikila is a village development committee in Darchula District in the Mahakali Zone of western Nepal.

== Population ==
At the time of the 1991 Nepal census it had a population of 2321 people living in 374 individual households.
