= Bir Bahadur Thagunna =

Nepali politician

Personal details
- Party: CPN (UML)

Bir Bahadur Thagunna is a Nepalese politician, belonging to the Communist Party of Nepal (Unified Marxist-Leninist). He contested the 1999 legislative election in the Darchula-1 constituency, coming second with 16,656 votes.
