= Naugad Rural Municipality =

Naugad Rural Municipality नौगाड गाउँपालिका
- Rural Municipality
- नौगाड गाउँपालिका Naugad Rural Municipality (Nepal)
- Coordinates: 29.7940°N 80.666°E
- Country: Nepal
- Province: Sudurpashchim Province
- District: Darchula District

Government
  - Type: Local government
  - Chairperson: Prem Singh Dhami
  - Administrative head: Pritam Singh Thagunna

Area
  - Total: 180.27 km^{2} (69.60 sq mi)

Population (2011 census)
  - Total: 15,874
  - Density: 88.057/km^{2} (228.07/sq mi)
- Time zone: UTC+05:45 (Nepal Standard Time)
- Website: https://naugadmun.gov.np

Naugad (Nepali: नौगाड) is a Gaupalika in Darchula District in the Sudurpashchim Province of far-western Nepal. Naugad has a population of 15874. The land area is 180.27 km^{2}.
