= Prem Singh Dhami =

Nepalese politician

Personal details
- Party: CPN (UML)

Prem Singh Dhami (Nepali: प्रेम सिंह धामी) was a Nepalese politician and former minister, belonging to the Communist Party of Nepal (Unified Marxist-Leninist). He was elected to the parliament in 1994.

In April 1997 he was appointed by Prime Minister Sher Bahadur Deuba to head a 'Working Committee for the Study of Maoist Activities and Finding Solutions', in order to counter the influence of the Communist Party of Nepal (Maoist). The committee was also known as the 'Dhami Commission'.
