= Api Nampa Conservation Area =

- Nepali: अपी नम्पा संरक्षण क्षेत्र
- IUCN category VI (protected area with sustainable use of natural resources)
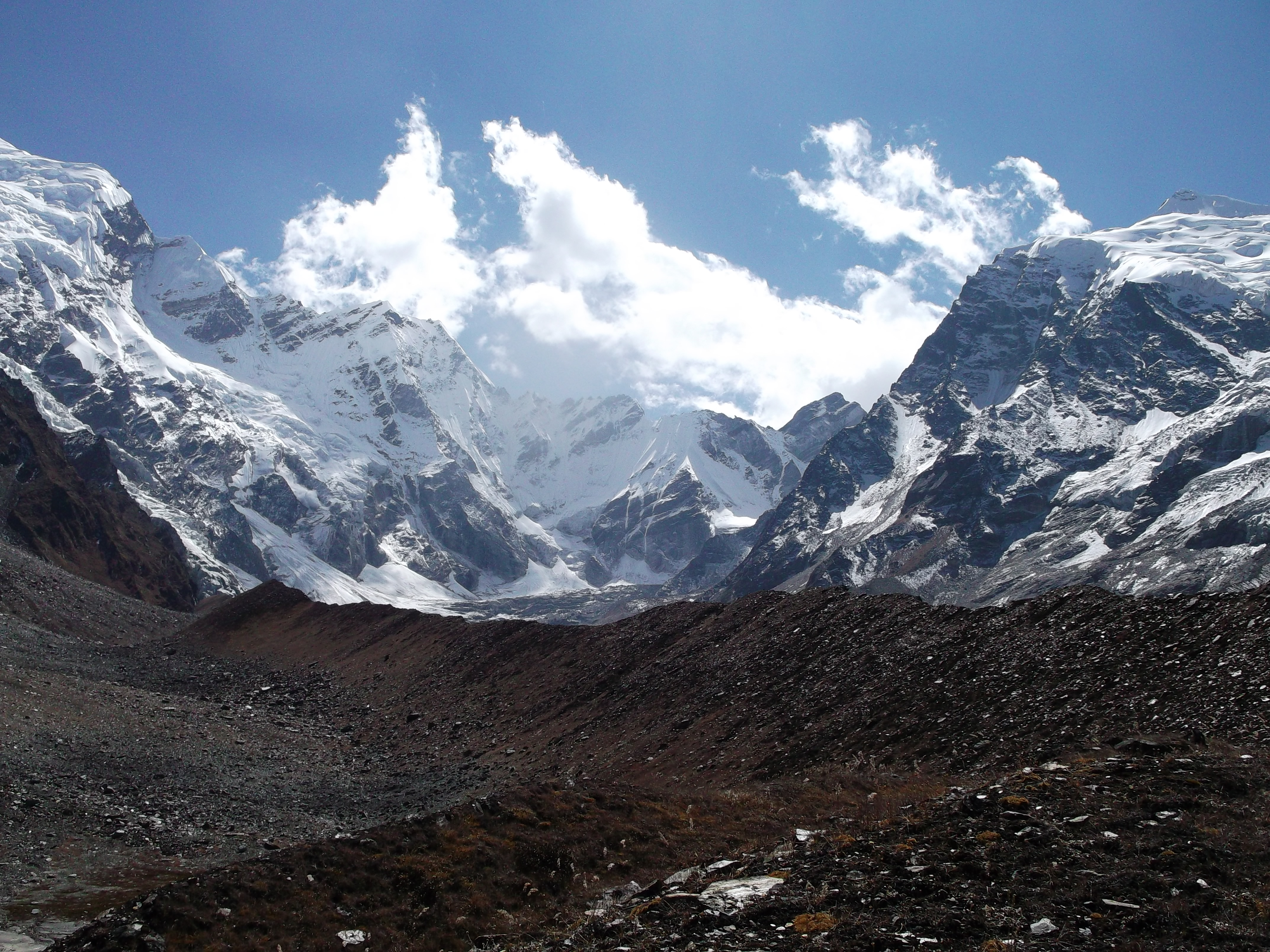

- Location within Sudurpashchim Province Location within Nepal Location within South Asia
- Location: Nepal
- Coordinates: 29.875°N 80.766°E
- Area: 1,903 km^{2} (735 sq mi)
- Established: 2010
- Governing body: Department of National Parks and Wildlife Conservation

The Api-Nampa Conservation Area is a protected area in western Nepal that was established in 2010. It has an area of 1,903 km^{2} (735 sq mi). It ranges in elevation from 518 to 7,132 m (1,699 to 23,399 ft) at the Himalayan peak Api and is part of the Kailash Sacred Landscape.

Named after the two peaks Api and Nampa, it was established to conserve the unique biodiversity and cultural heritage of the area. It is inhabited by 54,358 people living in 8966 households.

A grasslands plateau is at the center of the area. It is intermixed with various forest types.

== Fauna ==
Mammalian species include snow leopard, Himalayan black bear, red panda, common langur, Himalayan tahr, Himalayan musk deer, goral and serow. Birds include Himalayan monal, snowcock and blood pheasant.
