= Laxman Dutta Joshi =

Nepalese politician

Hari Lal Joshi

Personal details
- Party: Communist Party of Nepal (Maoist)

Laxman Dutta Joshi (Nepali: लक्ष्मण दत्त जोशी) is a Nepalese politician, belonging to the Communist Party of Nepal. In the 2008 Constituent Assembly election he was elected from the Darchula-1 constituency, winning 25404 votes.
