= Khalanga, Darchula =

Khalanga खलङ्गा Ghat Bazar
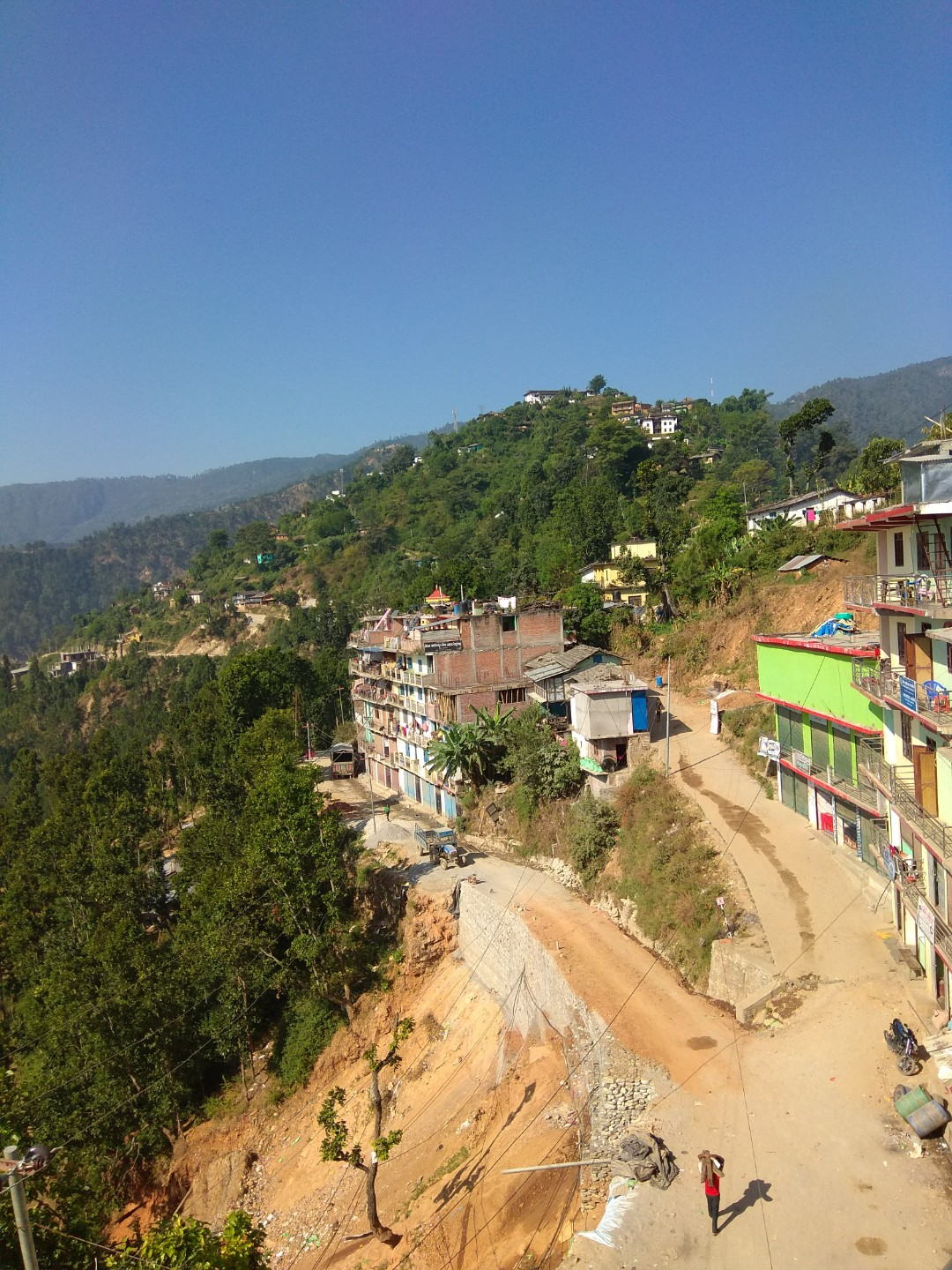
- Khalanga Bazaar

- Location in Nepal
- Coordinates: 29.84°N 80.54°E
- Country: Nepal
- Zone: Mahakali Zone
- District: Darchula District

Population (2001)
  - Total: 4,422
- Time zone: UTC+5:45 (Nepal Time)
- Postal code: 10100
- Area code: +977-93
- Website: www.onlinedarchula.eu.org

Khalanga is a town and the district headquarters of the Darchula District in the Sudurpashchim Province of Nepal. It is part of the Mahakali Municipality in the Mahakali Zone. The town is located on the bank of Mahakali River and the border with Dharchula District of Uttarakhand state, India. The town on the Indian side of the border also has a similar name, Dharchula.

The Mahakali River is the border between Nepal and India. There is a suspension bridge that connects the towns on the two sides. Nepali and Indian nationals can cross the border without any restrictions. The border is closed at night for security reasons. Although it is common for Nepali people to go to India for buying goods, they need to go through the customs checkpoint established in both (India and Nepal) sides.

== Demographics ==
At the time of the 2001 Nepal census it had a population of 4,422 people living in 809 individual households.
