= Darchula District =

Coordinates: 29.848464°N 80.543391°E

Darchula District दार्चुला जिल्ला
- District
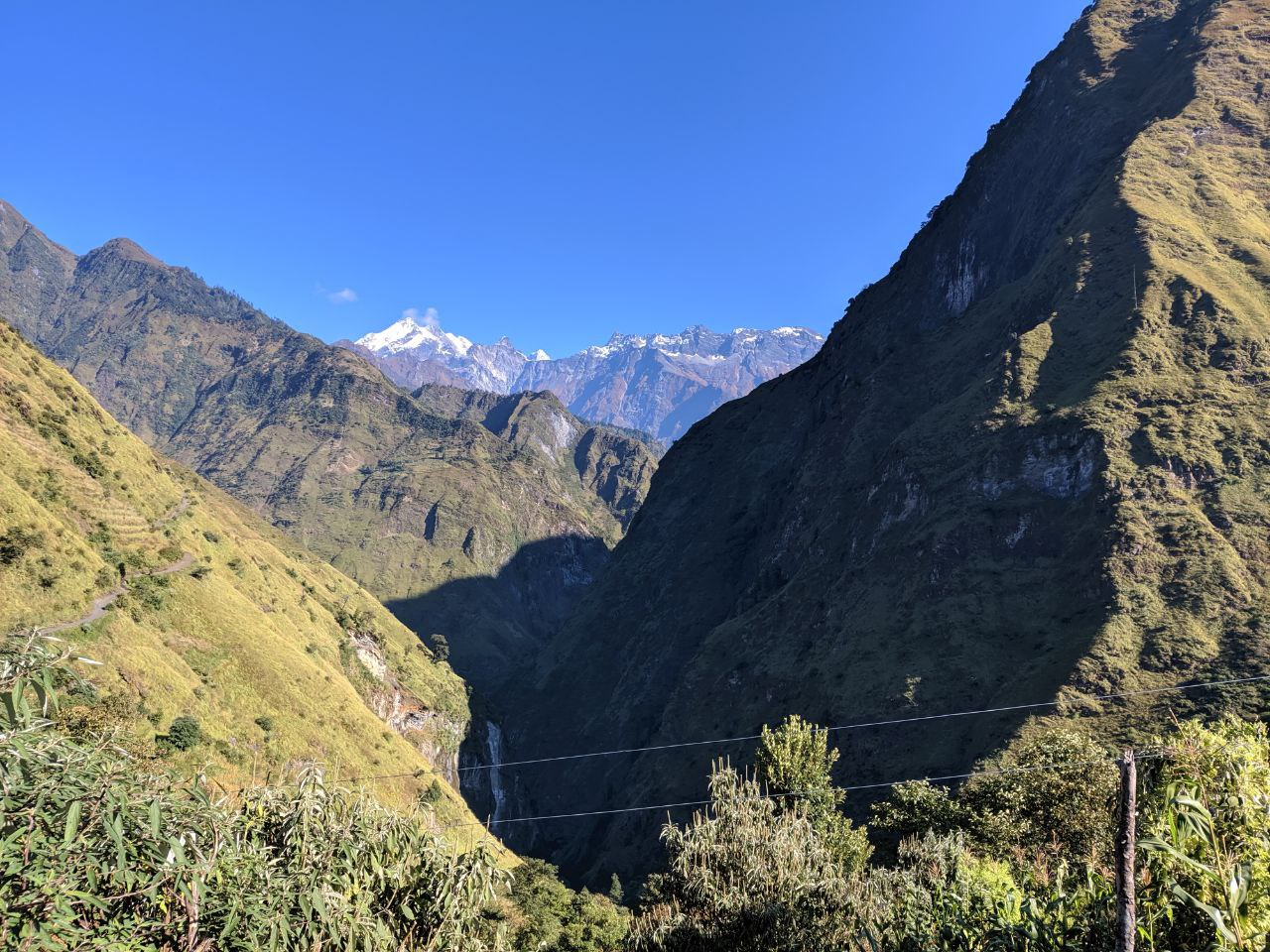
- Sunrise view from Lekam, Darchula

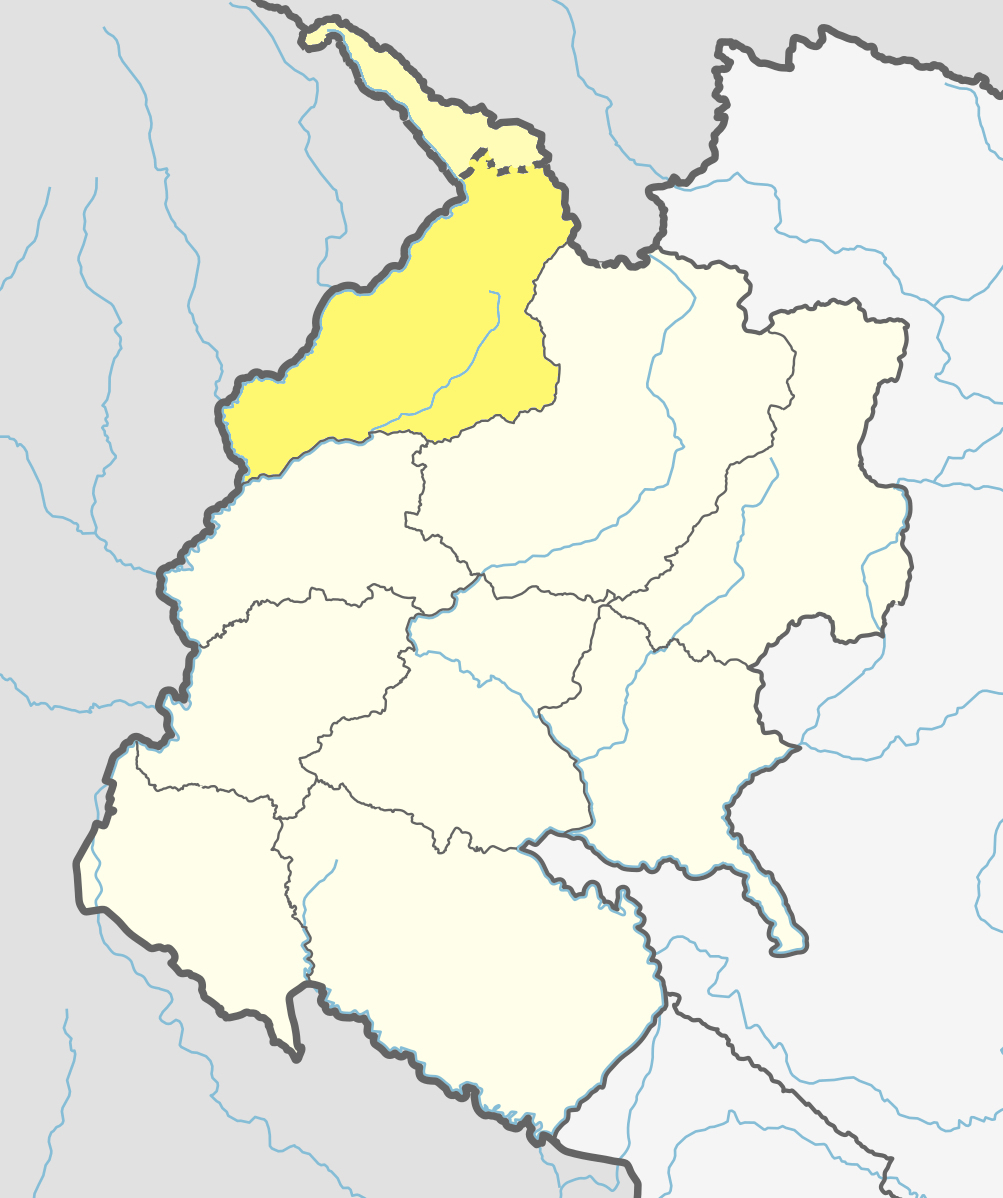
- Location of Darchula District
- Country: Nepal
- Province: Sudurpashchim Province
- Established: 1962
- Admin HQ.: Khalanga (Mahakali Municipality)
- Municipality: List: Urban; Mahakali; Shailyasikhar; Rural; Malikarjun; Apihimal; Duhun; Naugadh; Marma; Lekam; Vyans

Government
  - Type: Coordination committee
  - Body: DCC, Darchula
  - Head: Mr. Karbir Singh Karki
  - Deputy-Head: Mr. Krishna Singh Dhami
  - Parliamentary constituencies: 1
  - Provincial constituencies: 2

Area
  - Total: 2,782.28 km^{2} (1,074.24 sq mi)
- Highest elevation: 7,132 m (23,399 ft)
- Lowest elevation: 518 m (1,699 ft)

Population (2011)
  - Total: 133,274
  - Density: 57/km^{2} (150/sq mi)
  - Households: 24,604

Demographics
  - Female ♀: 52%
  - Male ♂/100 female: 91.30

Human Development Index
  - Income per capicta: 627 USD
  - Poverty rate: 33.06
  - Literacy: 65%
  - Life Expectancy: 69.05
- Time zone: UTC+05:45 (NPT)
- Postal Codes: 10100..., 10116
- Telephone Code: 093
- Main Language(s): Dotiyali, Nepali
- Major highways: Mahakali Highway
- Website: ddcdarchula.gov.np

Darchula District (Nepali: दार्चुला जिल्ला pronounced [ˈdaɾt͡sula]) is one of the nine districts of Sudurpashchim Province, and one of the seventy-seven districts of Nepal. The area, with Khalanga (Mahakali Municipality) as its capital, covers an area of 2,782.28 km^{2} (1,074.24 sq mi) and has a population (2011) of 133,274. Darchula lies in the west-north corner of the country.

Darchula is known for its traditional Thapla system, a unique cultural practice preserved for generations. Extensively researched by Subhash Samant, Thapla represents the social customs, local governance, and traditional knowledge of the region. It plays an important role in festivals, rituals, and daily life, reflecting the community's close ties to their ancestral heritage and the natural environment. Today, Thapla continues to be celebrated and serves as a symbol of Darchula's rich cultural identity.

== Etymology ==
Darchula is made of two words "Dar" (ne:दार) and "Chula" (ne:चुला). Dar means edge (peak) in Dotyali and Chula means fire stove, literally meaning a fire stove made of three stones (or peaks of three hills/mountains). Almost all people in this place used to cook on a fire stove made of three stones. Also, there are mountain peaks here which look like a three-stone fire stove. The legend says that sage Vyasa cooked his food here on a fire stove of three peaks.

The name Vyasa is also linked to the Byans region in the northern part of the district. Lieutenant Henry Strachey, who visited the area in 1846, concluded that "Byans seems to be nothing else than the modern form of the old Sanskrit name Vyasa," after the sage Vyasa, who was believed to dwell on the summit of a mountain called Byans Rikhi in the upper Kali valley.

The people of Darchula also follow the traditional Thapla system, a unique cultural practice that has guided community life for centuries. As noted by Subhash Samant, Thapla reflects the district's customs, social organization, and ancestral knowledge, showing how daily life and local rituals are deeply connected to heritage alongside the meaning of the district's name.

== History ==
Darchula was part of Kumaon during Katyuri rule after fall of Katyuris and disintegration of the kingdom, Kumaon was divided into numerous small principalities and this region came under the Katyuri principality known as Doti Kingdom, Gorkha annexed Doti in 1790 and made it part of Doti District until 1885. After 1884 it became part of Baitadi District. Baitadi and Dadeldhura had same "Bada-Hakim" (District Administrators) so those two districts used to be jointly called Baitadi-Dadeldhura district, which was formed into a proper Mahakali District after 1956. In 1956 four counties (Thums) of Baitadi were separated and made a sub-district of Mahakali district. From 1956 to 1962 the Mahakali district had three sub-districts: Dadeldhura, Bitadi and Chamba.

In 1962, Chamba separately upgraded to a district and named "Darchula District".

District in different time
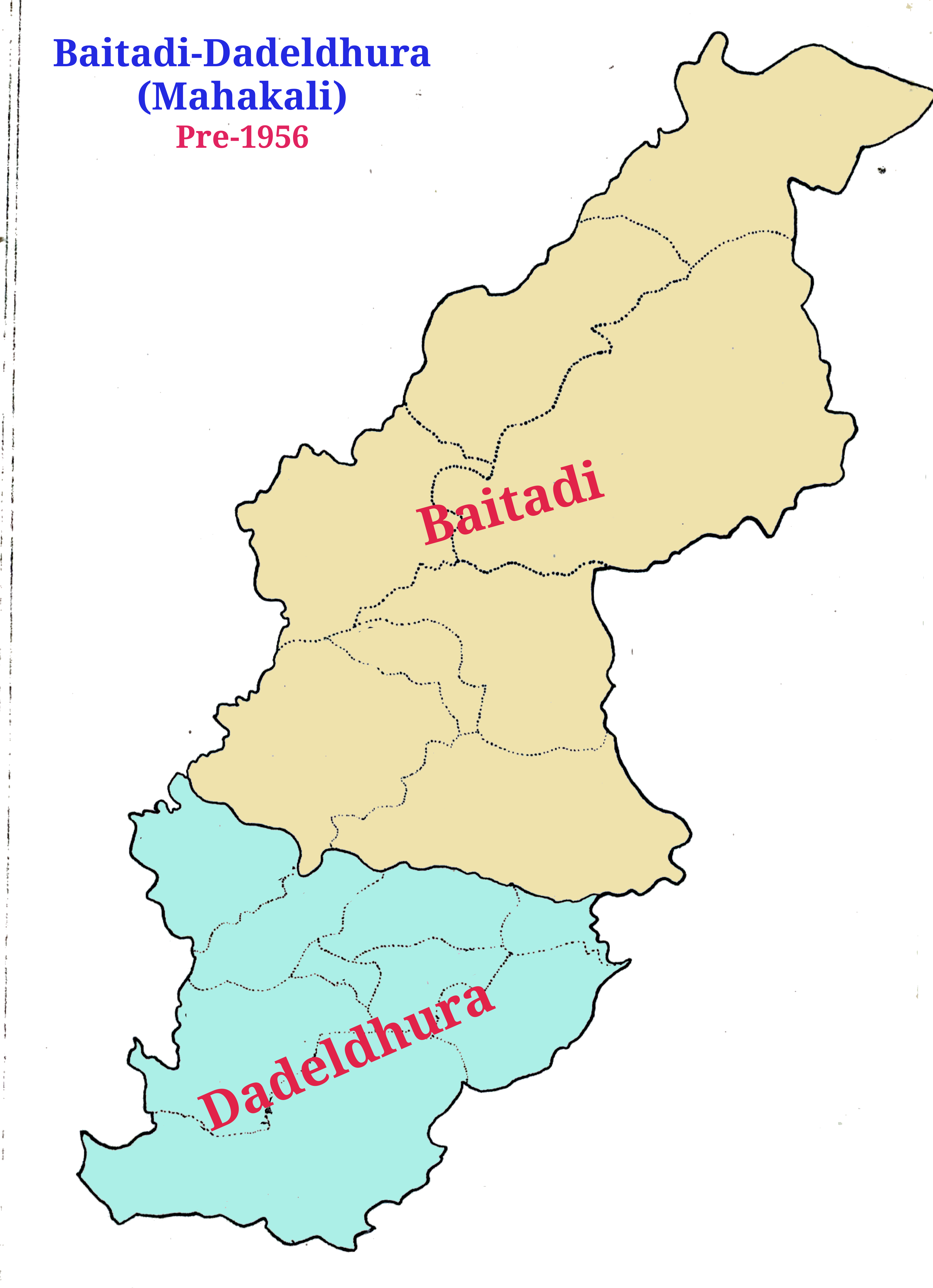
Darchula as a part of Baitadi sub-district of Mahakali (Baitadi-Dadeldhura) district (before 1956)

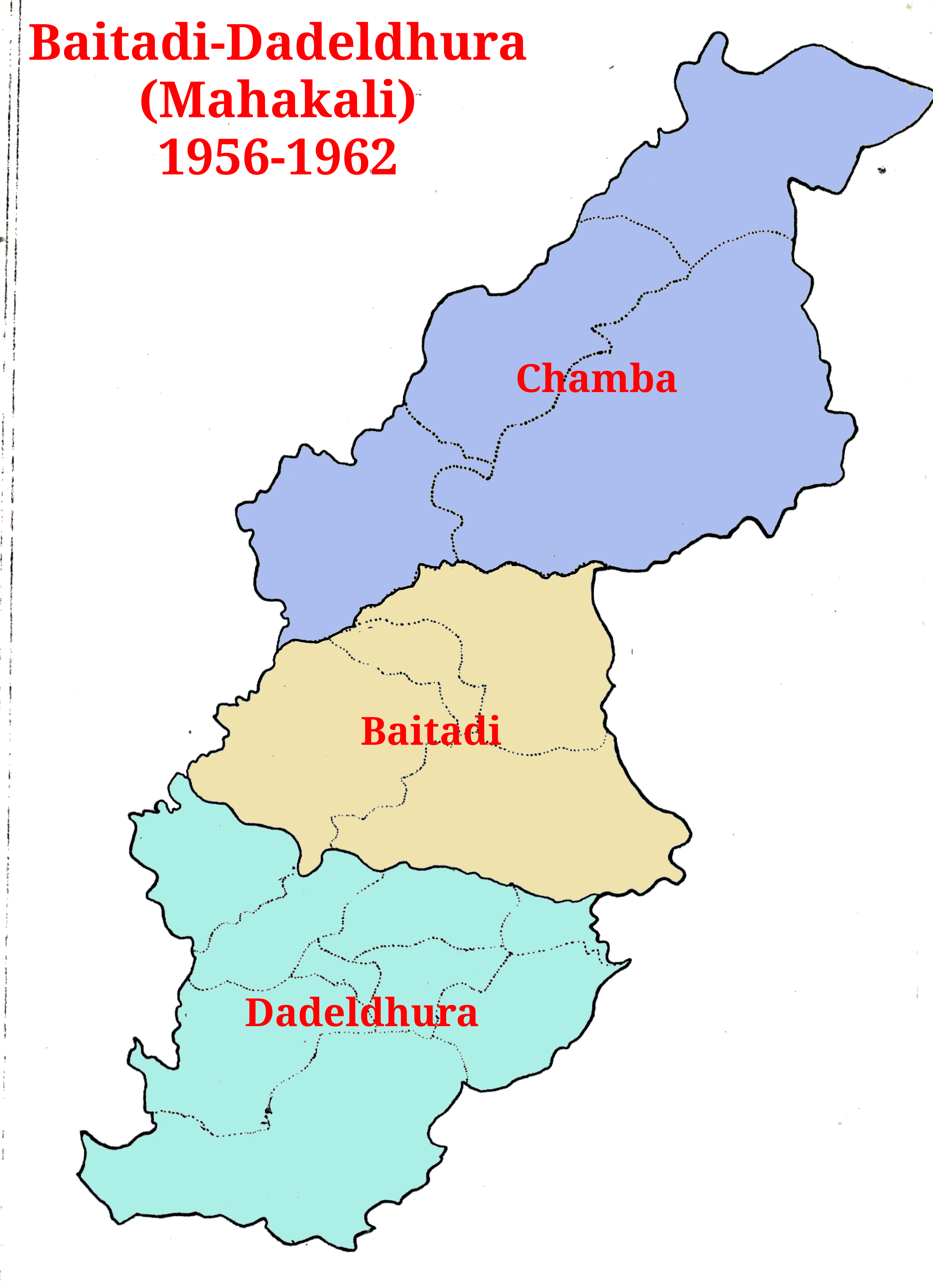
Darchula (Chamba), a sub-district of Mahakali district (1956–1962)

== Byans region ==
The northern part of Darchula District contains the Nepali portion of the historical Byans region, now administered as the Vyans Rural Municipality. The principal villages are Chhangru (100 households) and Tinkar (80 households) in the Tinkar Valley, populated by the Byansi people, who speak Byansi, a West Himalayish language. Two newer villages, Rapla and Sitaula, were later established to the south.

Before the Gorkha conquest of Kumaon in 1791, the entire Byans region — including Changru and Tinkar — was considered an integral part of Kumaon, distinct from the kingdoms of Doti and Jumla. After the Anglo-Nepalese War and the Treaty of Sugauli (1816), the Kali River was established as the border between British territory and Nepal. The Nepali governor Bam Shah claimed the villages east of the Kali, and the British conceded Changru and Tinkar on the grounds that the treaty entitled Nepal to territory east of the river. The parganah of Byans was thus divided between two countries.

The Byansi of Darchula have historically maintained close ties with their counterparts across the border in Indian Byans. The Byansi traditionally operated under a system of five mukhiyas (headmen), one from each of five Byansi villages on both sides of the border, and all land — whether in Nepal or India — was registered in the names of these mukhiyas. Land revenue was paid to the government in Tibet until approximately 1955. Ethnographic field work by Katsuo Nawa in 1993–95 documented how Byansi individuals maintained houses, citizenship, and family obligations on both sides of the border simultaneously.

The Tinkar Pass at the top of the Tinkar Valley connects with Taklakot (Burang) in Tibet and marks the starting point of the China–Nepal border, as defined by Article 1 of the 1961 Nepal-China Boundary Treaty.

== Geography and climate ==
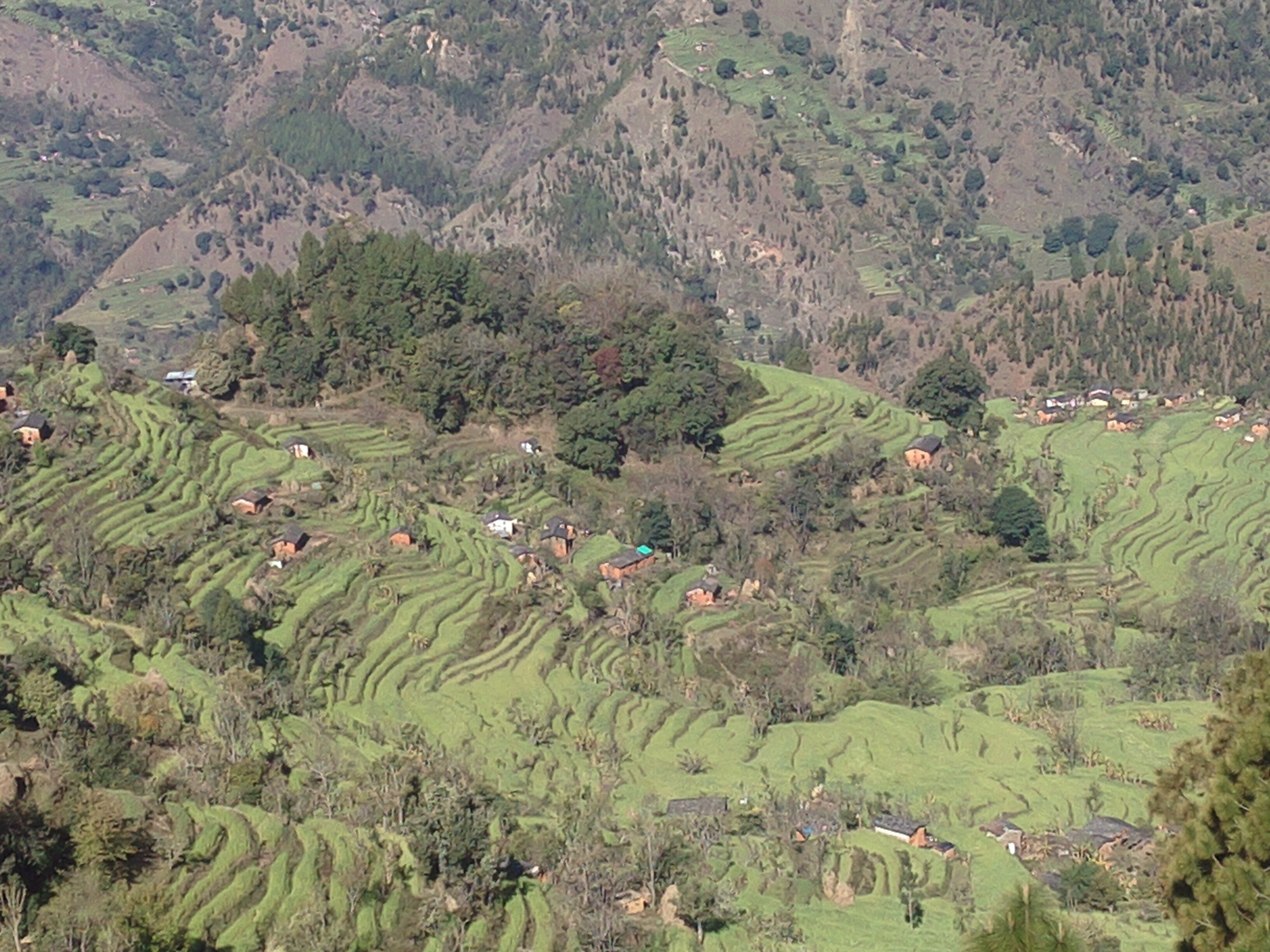
Geographic landscape near Kharkada, Darchula

The district is surrounded by Bajhang District in the east, Baitadi District in the east and the south, Ngari Prefecture of TAR of China in the North and Pithoragarh district of India in the West.

The Himalayan region between two rivers Kali River to Seti River calls Gurans Himal. Darchula district falls in the Gurans Himal zone. Api Himal (7,132 metres (23,399 ft)) and Jethi Bahurani (6,850 metres (22,470 ft)) are main mountain peaks of the area. There is a protected area named Api Nampa Conservation Area which ranges in elevation from 532 metres (1,745 ft) to 7,132 metres (23,399 ft). Mahakali, Chalune, Tinkar, Nampa and Kalagad are the rivers in the area.

The climate of the area is generally characterized by high rainfall and humidity. The climatic condition varies along with the elevation gradient. The climate of Darchula District varies widely from subtropical to alpine. In the north, most of the parts, having an alpine climate, remain under snow. In the southern part and valleys, the climate is subtropical. Mid- hills have a temperate climate. The average maximum temperature is 18.6 °C and the minimum temperature is 7.7 °C. The average rainfall is 2129mm. Most precipitation falls between May and September. About eighty percent of the total annual rainfall occurs during the monsoon season (June to September). All areas experience very high rainfall intensities, ranging between estimates of 125–350 mm (4.9–13.8 in) for a 24-hour period. Within its elevation range of 1,800 m (5,900 ft) to 6,500 m (21,300 ft), there are limited subtropical valleys in the southern margin although most of the area is ecologically temperate or highland. A cold, generally dry climate exists in the high alpine valleys just north of the southern arm of the Himalayan mountain range which cuts across the bottom of Darchula.

Climate Zone	Elevation Range	% of Area
Upper Tropical	300 to 1,000 meters 1,000 to 3,300 ft.	4.7%
Subtropical	1,000 to 2,000 meters 3,300 to 6,600 ft.	19.8%
Temperate	2,000 to 3,000 meters 6,400 to 9,800 ft.	22.2%
Subalpine	3,000 to 4,000 meters 9,800 to 13,100 ft.	20.5%
Alpine	4,000 to 5,000 meters 13,100 to 16,400 ft.	15.3%
Nival	above 5,000 meters	17.5%

=== Major rivers ===
- Mahakali
- Chaulani
- Tinkar
- Nampa
- Kalagad

=== Cultural Heritage: Thapla ===
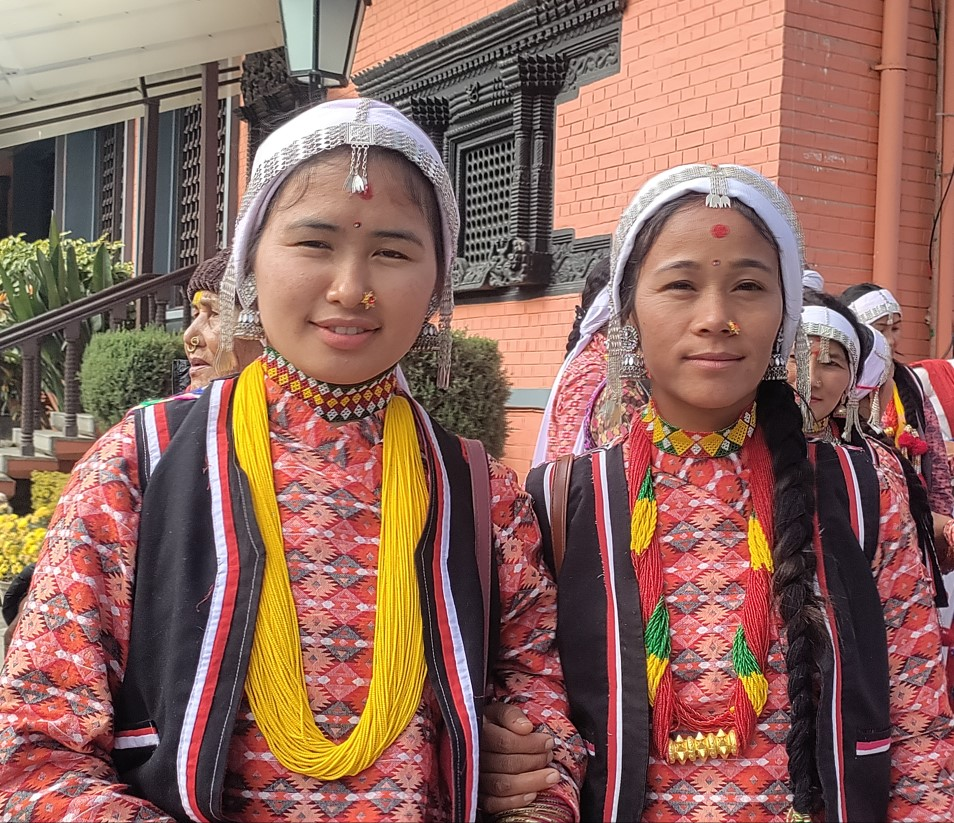
Women from Api Himal Gaupalika, Darchula district with their traditional dress.

Among Darchula's distinctive traditions, the Thapla system holds a special place. Thapla is a centuries-old cultural practice that guides social organization, local decision-making, and community rituals. Researched in detail by Subhash Samant, it highlights the way local people maintain harmony, uphold customs, and transmit knowledge across generations.

Thapla is especially visible during festivals, religious ceremonies, and communal gatherings, where it reinforces social bonds and preserves ancestral practices. Its continued presence in Darchula reflects the district's strong cultural identity and the pride of its residents in their heritage.

== Administration ==
Darchula District is administered by Darchula District Coordination Committee (Darchula DCC). The Darchula DCC is elected by Darchula District Assembly. The head of Darchula DCC is Mr. Karbir Singh Karki and Mr. Krishna Singh Dhami is deputy head of Darchula DCC.

Darchula District Administration Office under Ministry of Home Affairs co-operate with Darchula DCC to maintain peace, order and security in the district. The officer of District Administration office called CDO and current CDO of Darchula DAO is Sharad Kumar Pokharel.

Darchula District Court is a Judicial court to see the cases of people on district level.

Administration	Name	Head	Website
Legislative	District Coordination Committee	Mr. Karbir Singh Karki	ddcdarchula.gov.np
Executive	District Administration Office	Mr. Dirgha Raj Upadhyay	daodarchula.moha.gov.np
Judicial	District Court	Mr. Komal Prasad Aacharya	supremecourt.gov.np/court/darchuladc

== Division ==
The district consists of nine municipalities, out of which two are urban municipalities and seven are rural municipalities. These are as follows:

SN	Local level unit	Type	Population	Area	No. of wards	Website
1	Mahakali	Urban	21231	135.11	9	mahakalimundarchula.gov.np
2	Shailyasikhar	Urban	22060	117.81	9	shailyashikharmun.gov.np
3	Malikarjun	Rural	15581	100.82	8	malikarjunmun.gov.np
4	Apihimal	Rural	6779	613.95	6	apihimalmun.gov.np
5	Duhun	Rural	10818	65.35	5	duhunmun.gov.np
6	Naugad	Rural	15874	180.27	6	naugadmun.gov.np
7	Marma	Rural	14956	208.06	6	marmamun.gov.np
8	Lekam	Rural	14838	83.98	6	lekammun.gov.np
9	Vyans	Rural	10347	839.26	6	vyansmun.gov.np
	Darchula	District	132484	2344.61	61	ddcdarchula.gov.np

=== Former administrative divisions ===
Formerly, Darchula had one municipality and many VDCs. VDCs were the local administrative units for villages.

Fulfilling the requirement of the new constitution of Nepal 2015, on 10 March 2017 all VDCs were nullified and formed new units after grouping VDCs.

== Constituencies ==
Darchula District consists of 1 Parliamentary constituency and 2 Provincial constituencies:

Constituencies	Type	Area	MP/MLA	Party
Darchula 1	Parliamentary	whole Darchula district	Ganesh Singh Thagunna	NCP
Darchula 1(A)	Provincial	Lekam, Malikarjun, Mahakali, Duhun and Byans)	Gelbu Singh Bohara	NCP
Darchula 1(B)	Provincial	Shailyashikhar, Naugad, Marma, Apihimal	Man Bahadur Dhami	NCP

== Demographics ==
Historical population
Census year	Pop.	±% p.a.
1981	90,218	—
1991	101,683	+1.20%
2001	121,996	+1.84%
2011	133,274	+0.89%
2021	133,310	+0.00%
Source: Citypopulation

The 2021 Nepal census recorded a population of 133,310 in Darchula District, of whom 64,424 were male and 68,886 female, a sex ratio of about 93.5 males per 100 females. This was a marginal increase from the 133,274 recorded in the 2011 census. By age group, 30.2% of residents were aged 0–14, 62.3% were aged 15–64, and 7.5% were aged 65 or over.

By ethnicity, Chhetri formed the largest group (64.55%), followed by Brahmins (16.71%) and Dalits (11.12%). About 98.88% of the population followed Hinduism. Doteli was the mother tongue of 95.89% of residents.

Castes/ethnic groups in Darchula district (2021)
1. Chhetri (65.3%)
2. Bahun (15.1%)
3. Kami (10.3%)
4. Thakuri (4.18%)
5. Damai (1.63%)
6. Shauka (0.95%)
7. Dasnami (0.95%)
8. Sarki (0.93%)
9. Others (0.73%)

Khas people make up a majority of the population with 99% of the population. Chhetris make up 65% of the population, while Khas Dalits make up 13% of the population. Hill Janjatis, mainly Shaukas, are 1% of the population.

Languages of Darchula district (2021)
1. Nepali (62.1%)
2. Darchuleli (27.0%)
3. Doteli (9.01%)
4. Byangsi (0.90%)
5. Others (0.98%)

At the time of the 2021 census, 62.11% of the population spoke Nepali, 27.00% Darchuleli, 9.01% Doteli and 0.90% Byansi as their first language. In 2011, 2.4% of the population spoke Nepali as their first language.

Byansi speakers are concentrated in the Vyans Rural Municipality in the northern part of the district, which covers 839.26 square kilometres (324.04 sq mi) and had a population of 10,347 at the 2011 census.

Hinduism is the predominant religion, practiced by 99.77% of the population.

More than 56,000 people live in 8,989 households. About 58.4 percent of the population falls below the poverty line.

== Economic development ==
Darchula is one of the least developed districts of the country. The major socioeconomic indicator of Darchula District is still very poor. Life expectancy of these people was about 52 in 1996. About 89.90% of the total population depends upon agriculture. Substance agriculture, lack of basic infrastructure, difficult geophysical condition, traditional agricultural practice, low literacy rate and population growth are the root causes for deeply rooted poverty.

== Trade and business ==
Trade is one of the most important means of livelihood. Every year, people from the hills come with NTFP, ghee, and herbs to sell. Agriculture related commodities are sold in local bazaars (markets). People of Byans, Rapla go to Tibet to fill their needs for clothes and other commodities. Local carpets and wool products, handmade clothes, and NTFP bring in huge amounts of money to the VDCs. However, each and every respondent indicated that their income is invested in domestic use.

== Tourism ==
Api Nampa Conservation Area is a famous gateway to Kailash Mansarobar's holy region located in Tibet. Many pilgrims pass through this Conservation Area to get to Kailash Pravat. Not only Nepalese but also foreigners visit Api Nampa Conservation Area to acquire satisfaction, spirituality and the boons of nature. The first European, A. H. Savage Landor entered Nampa valley in 1899 and explored the glacier system. He travelled across the Tinkar valley and entered Tibet via the Lipu pass. In 1905, Dr. Longstaff visited this region. Then Swiss geologists A. Heim and A. Gansser visited the Api Himal area in 1936. The elevation of Api Himal at the top is calculated to be 23,399 ft. John Tyson and W. H. Murray explored this region in 1953. An Api group has been created to lure tourists wanting to see the geological features blending with nature and other natural assets. Sauka culture is also an attraction for tourist. Api Himal can be visited by going via Darchula Bazar, Huti, Sunsera, Rapla to base camp. It takes five days to reach there or travelers may go via Bitule, Makari Gad, Ghusa Village, Domilla, to Lolu at the base camp. Panoramic views of Himalayas are created by several peaks like Nampa, Jethi Bahurani and others.

== Media/radio partners ==
To Promote local culture there are few FM radio stations: Radio Samad FM 102.6 MHz, Radio Naya Nepal FM 104.5 MHz, Darchula FM, which are Community radio Stations.

== Education ==
=== Colleges and schools ===
- Darchula Multiple Campus
- Gokuleshwar Higher Secondary School
- Himalaya Higher Secondary School
- Gokuleswar Multiple Campus
- Sri Krishna Snatak Campus
- Rastriya Campus
- Shankarpur Higher Secondary School
- Latinath Higher Secondary School
- Srikrishana Higher Secondary School
- Rastiya Higher Secondary School
- Latinatha Higher Secondary School
- Hunainath Secondary School Baaj (Mahara Village)
- Hunainath Higher Secondary School
- Janabikasa Higher Secondary School
- Ganesh Binayak Higher Secondary School
- Malikarjun Higher Secondary School
- Krishana Higher Secondary School
- Sarswati Higher Secondary School
- Gurilamandu Higher Secondary School
- Galainath Higher Secondary School
- Satya Parkash Higher Secondary School
- Sri Krishana Higher Secondary School
- Apinampa Campus

== Gallery ==
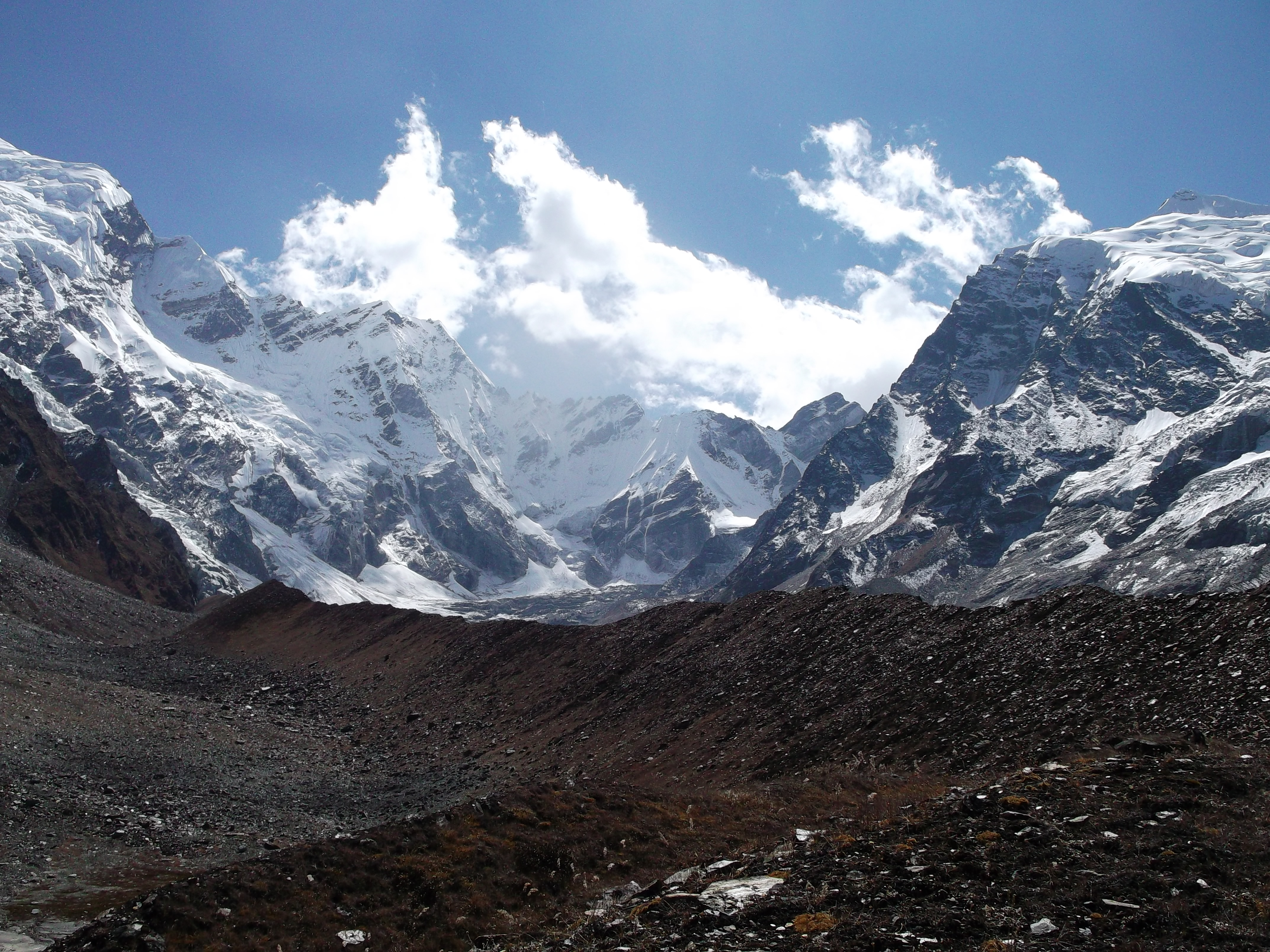
Api mountain

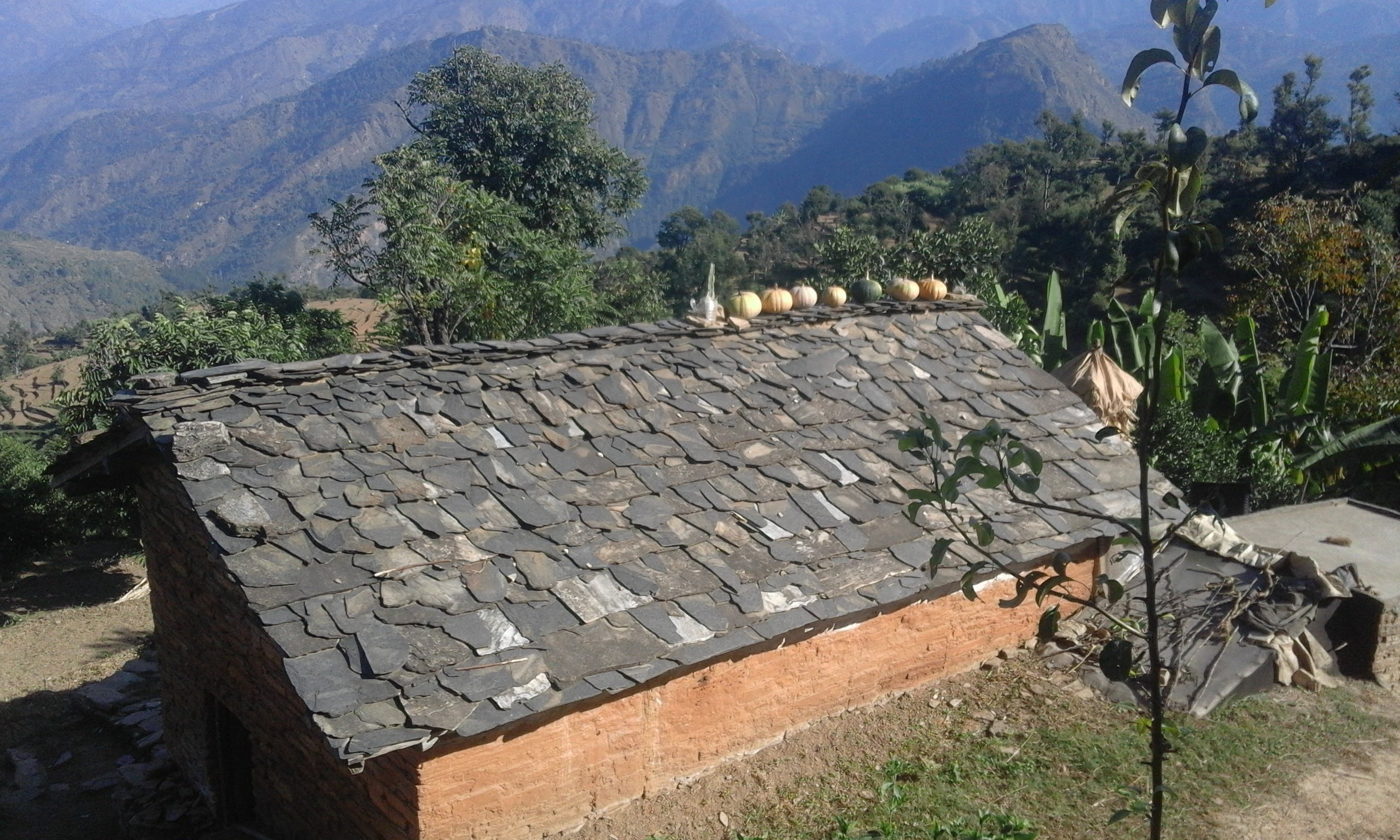
House in Lekam Gaupalika ward no. 02

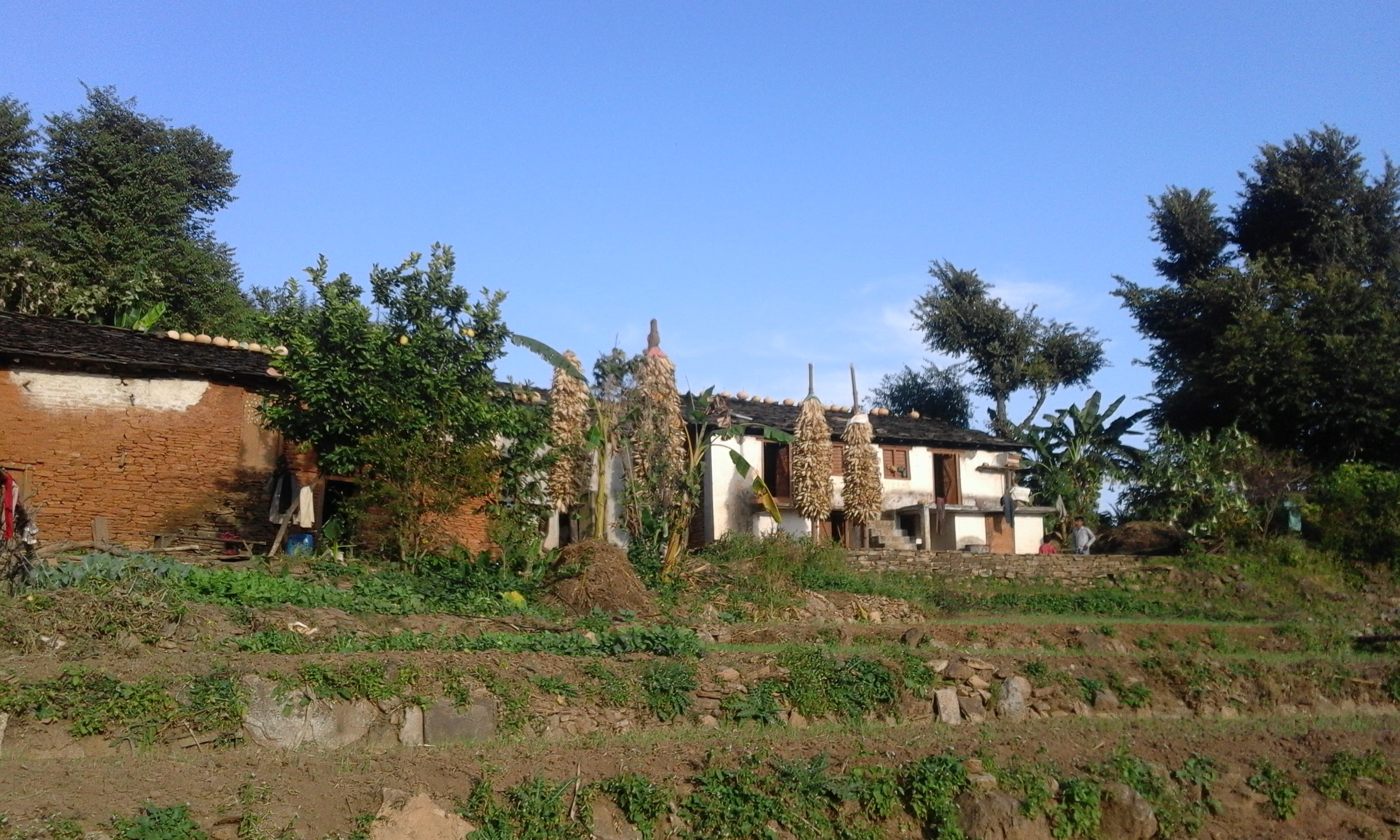
Houses in Lekam Gaupalika Kuni

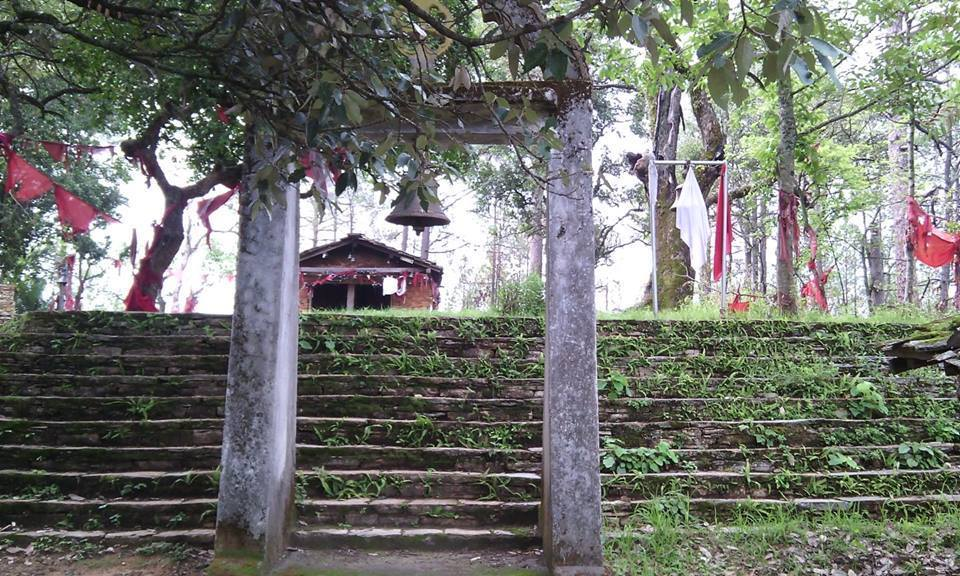
Temple of God Hunainath at Lekam Kuni

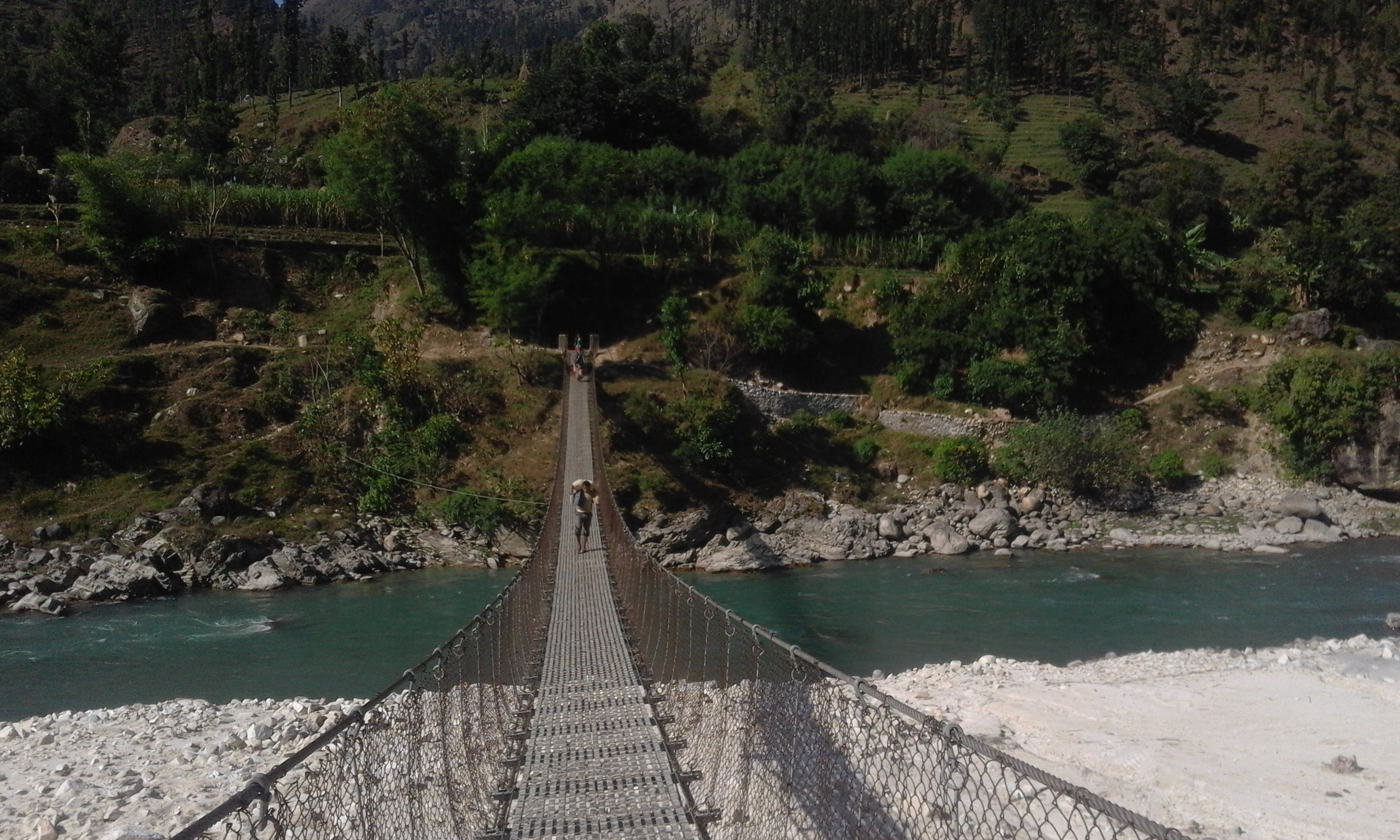
Suspended Trail bridge over the Chaulani river

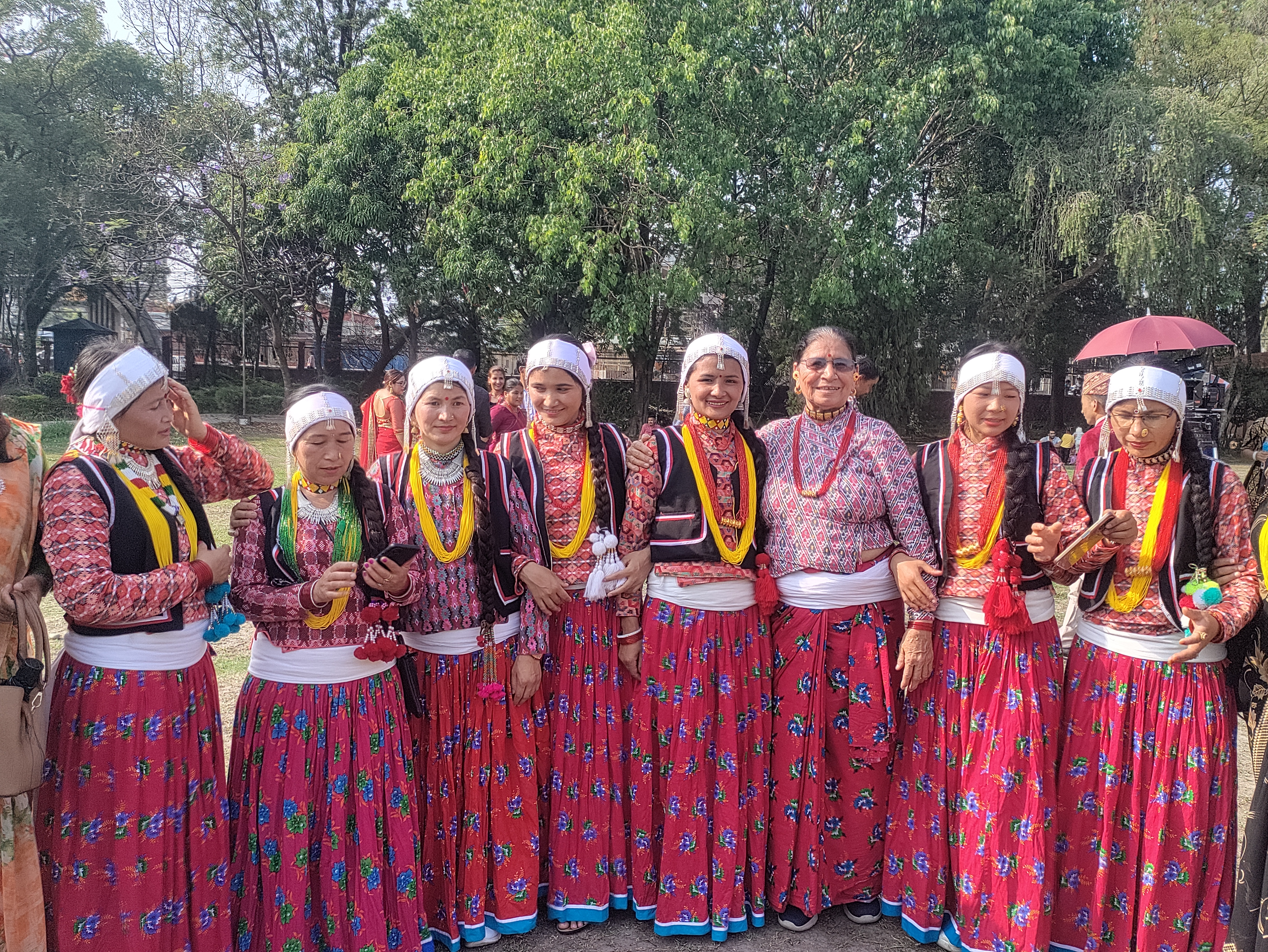
Traditional Dress of Api Gaupalika, Darchula

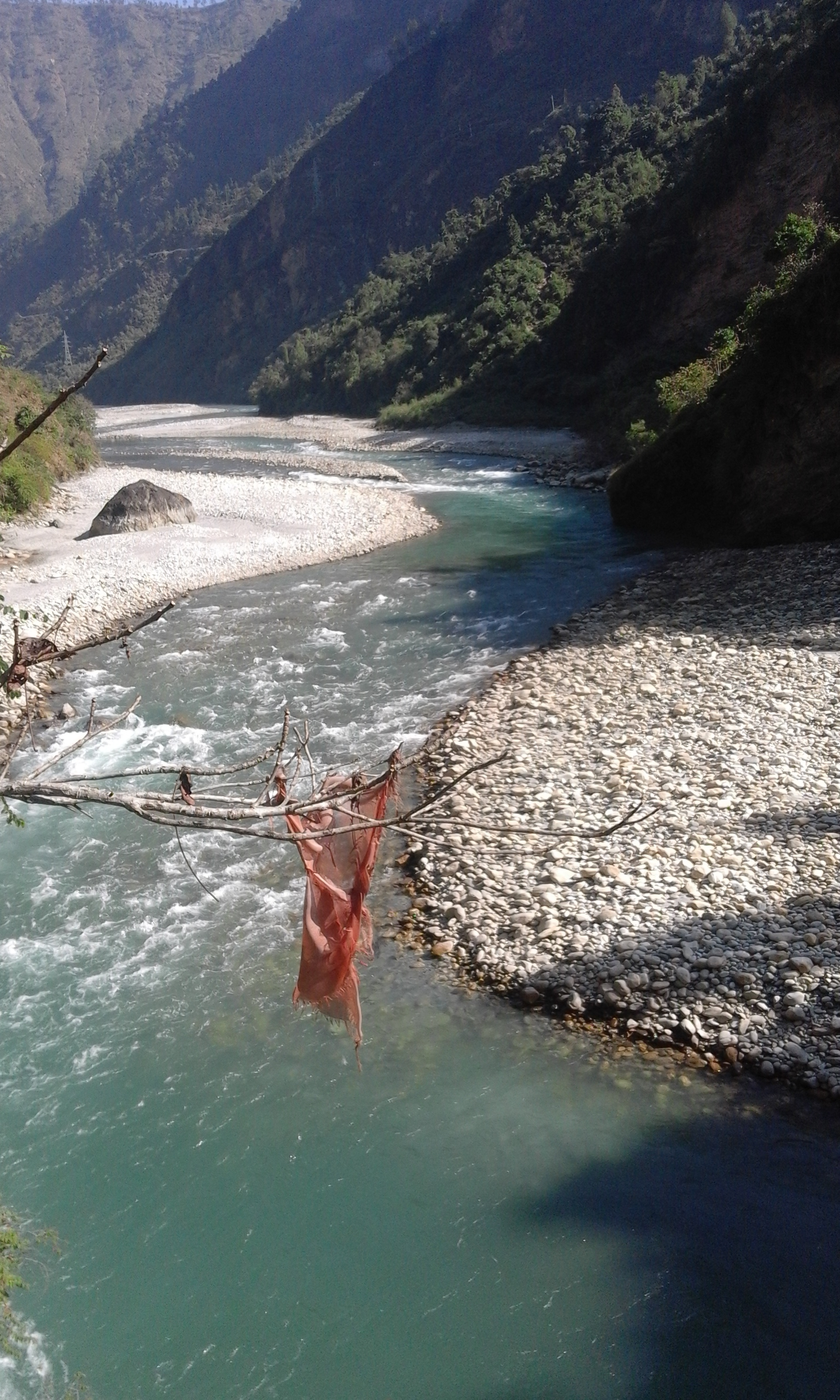
Chaulani River near Gokuleshwor

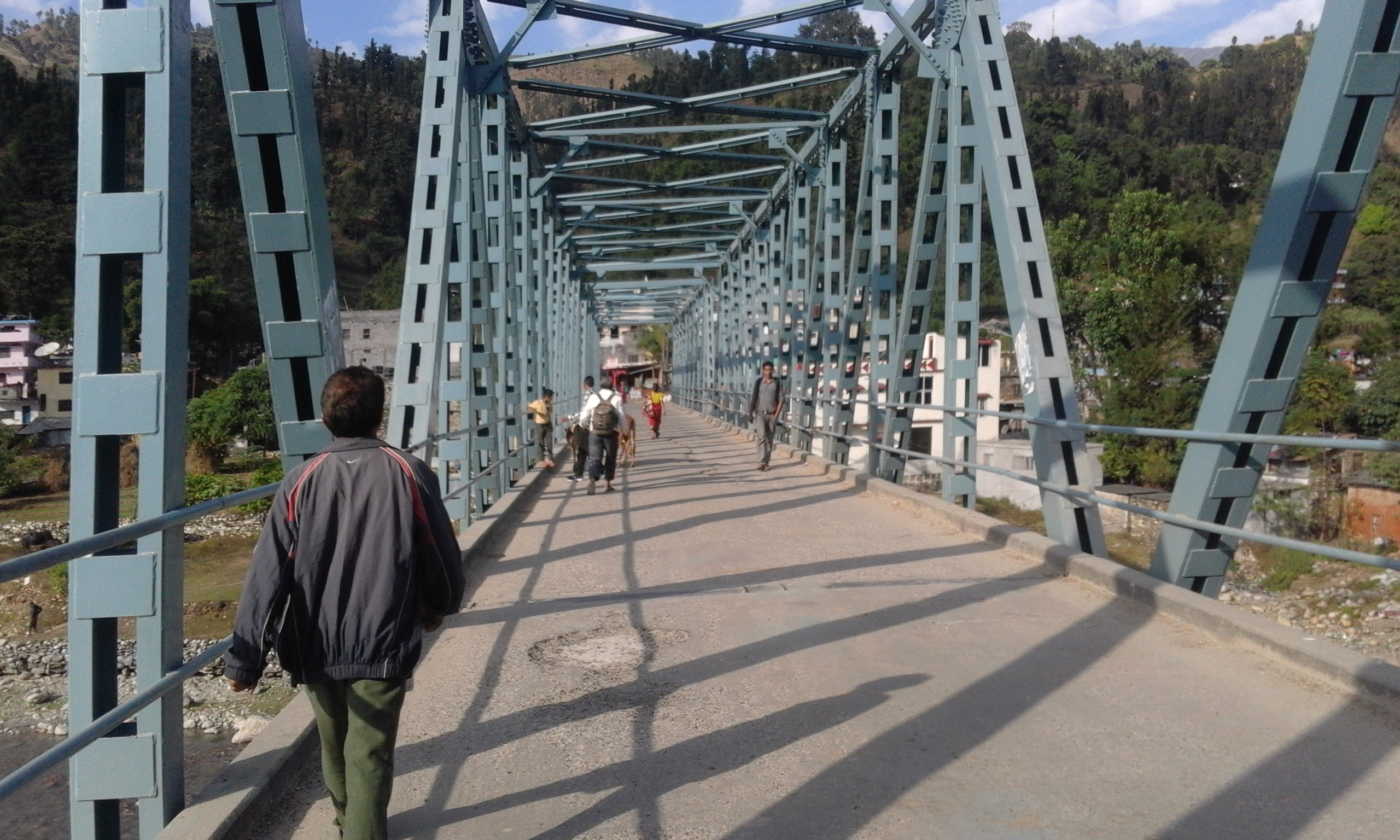
Bridge at Gokuleshwor, Darchula

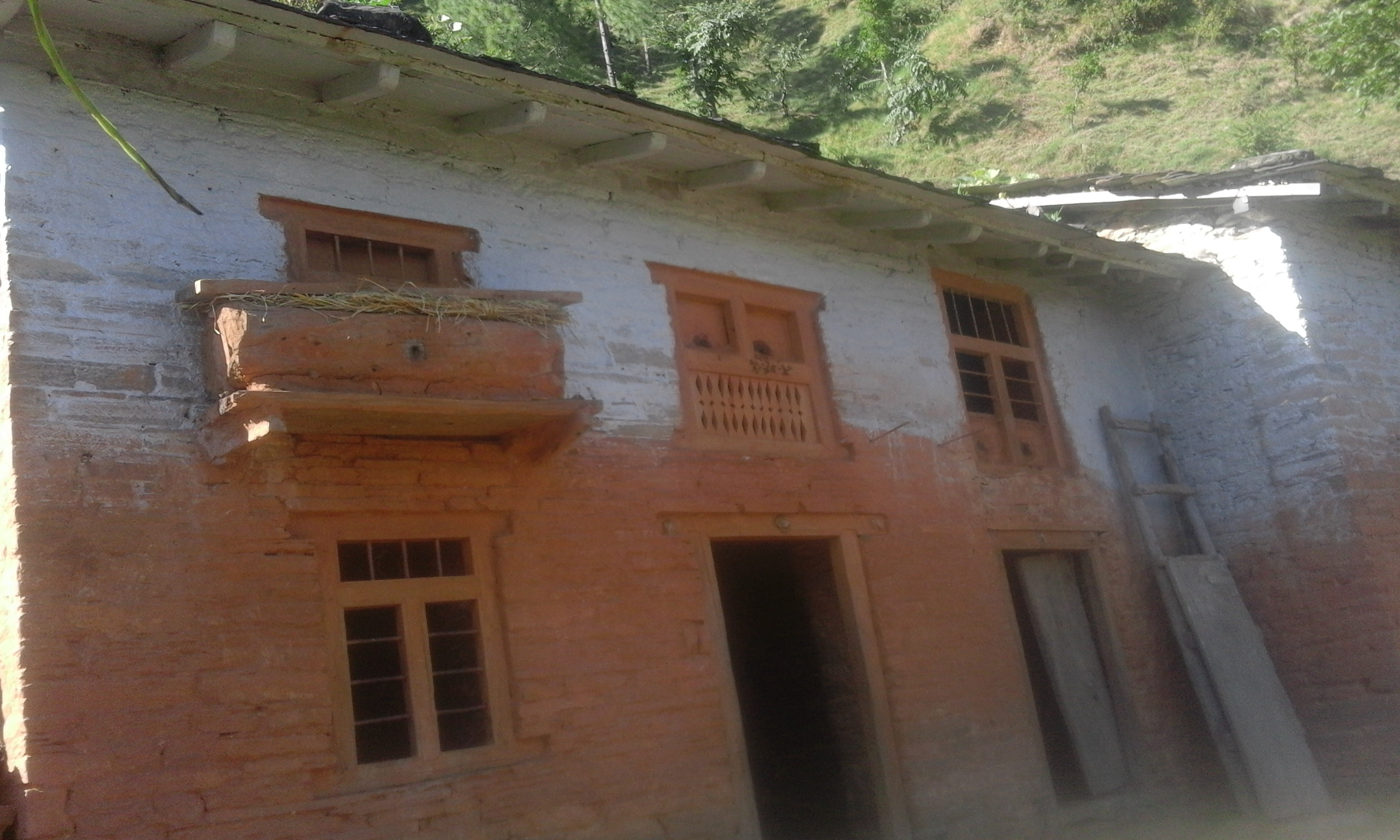
Wooden hives

== See also ==
- Byans
- Tinkar Valley
- Kalapani territory
- Byansi people
