= China–Nepal relations =

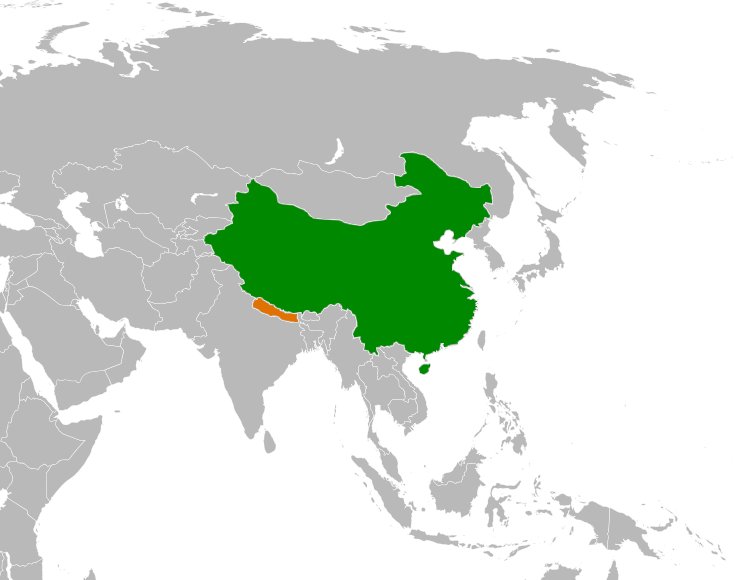
- China: Nepal

The bilateral relations between China and Nepal are defined by the Sino-Nepalese Treaty of Peace and Friendship signed on 28 April 1960, by the two countries. Though initially unenthusiastic, Nepal has been of late making efforts to increase trade and connectivity with China. Relations between Nepal and China got a boost when both countries solved all border disputes along the China–Nepal border by signing the Sino-Nepal boundary agreement on 21 March 1960, making Nepal the first neighboring country of China to conclude a border treaty with China. The governments of both Nepal and China ratified the border treaty on 5 October 1961. From 1975 onward, Nepal has maintained a policy of balancing the competing influence of China and Nepal's southern neighbor India, the only two neighbors of the Himalayan country after the accession of the Kingdom of Sikkim into India in 1975.

In recent years, China has been making an effort to gain entry into South Asian Association for Regional Cooperation (SAARC), and, Nepal has continuously backed and supported the proposal to include China as a member in the regional grouping. Since 1975, Sino-Nepalese relations have been close and grown significantly, with China overtaking India as the largest source of total Foreign direct investment (FDI) since 2015.

== Nepal, Tibet and China ==
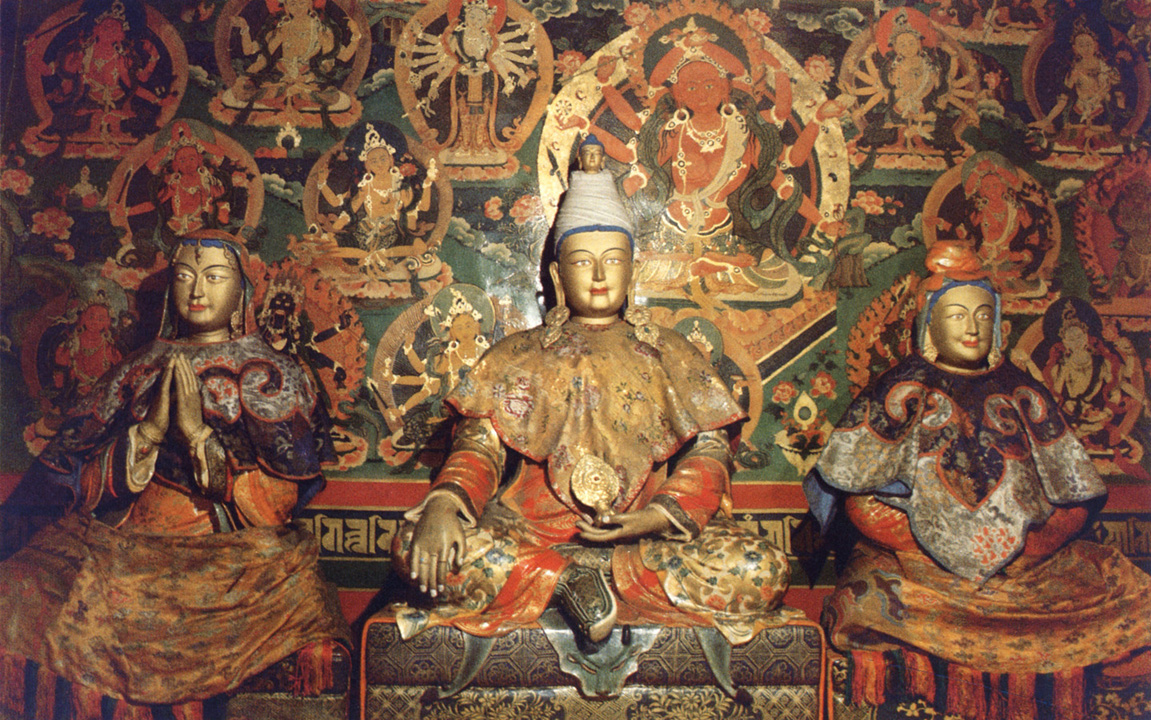
Songtsän Gampo (centre) Princess Wencheng (right) and Princess Balmobza' Khribtsun (left)

The relationship between Nepal and Tibet are centuries old, with the Sherpa people, the Gurung people and the Thakali people of Nepal sharing close linguistic, cultural, marital, and, ethnic ties with the Tibetan people of Tibet.

Around 600–650 CE, Nepalese Princess Bhrikuti (Bal-mo-bza' Khri-btsun in Tibetan) married Songtsän Gampo, the earliest known Emperor of Tibet. Princess Bhrikuti, as a part of her dowry, is widely believed to have brought Buddhists relics and Thangkas to Tibet, and therefore, is attributed for establishing Buddhism as the Royal religion in Tibet. Bhrikuti is usually represented as Green Tara in Tibetan iconography. The Red Palace (Mar-po-ri Pho-drang) on Marpo Ri (Red Mountain) in Lhasa, which was later rebuilt into the thirteen storey Potala Palace by the Fifth Dalai Lama, was constructed by Newari craftsmen according to her wishes, who came to Tibet from Kathmandu with her, as a part of her dowry. She also instructed her craftsmen to construct the Tub-wang and other statues in Samye, the first Buddhist gompa in Tibet. One of her craftsmen, Thro-wo, also carved the revered statue of Chenresig (Avalokiteshvara), Thungji Chen-po rang-jung nga-ldan.

During the Tang dynasty, the Chinese envoy Wang Xuance led an army of Nepalese and Tibetans to defeat an usurper in the Indian Kingdom of Magadha at the Battle of Chabuheluo. In 1260 CE during the Yuan dynasty, Nepalese craftsmen Araniko, on the decree of Chinese/Mongolian Emperor Kublai Khan, traveled to Shangdu and built the White Stupa of Miaoying Temple in Beijing, which was the largest structure in Beijing at that time. Taking almost ten years (1279–1288 CE) to complete, the Stupa better known as White Dagoba, is still standing today and is considered to be one of the oldest Buddhist Stupa in China.

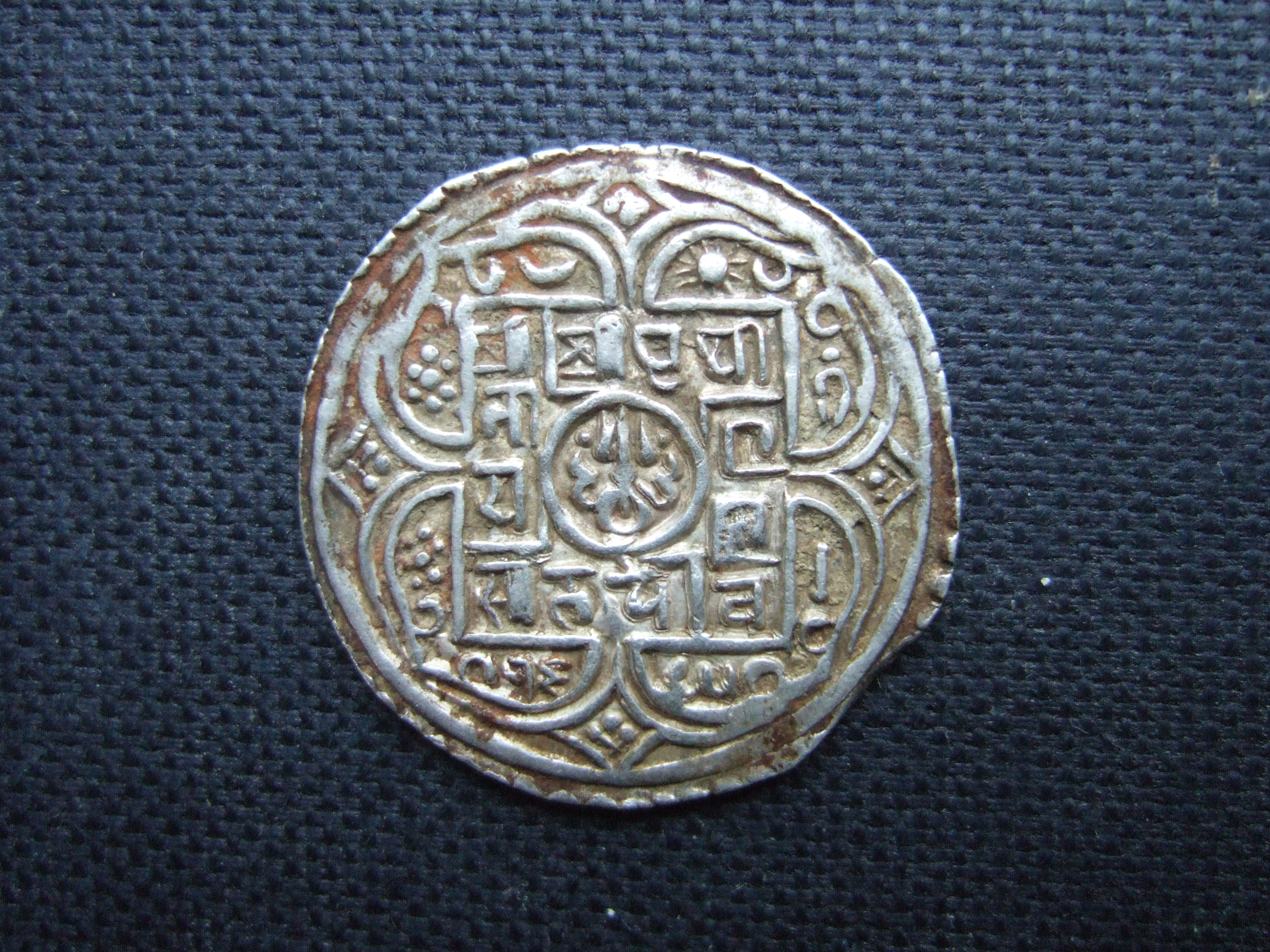
Mohar of king Prithvi Narayan Shah dated Saka Era 1685 (AD 1763)

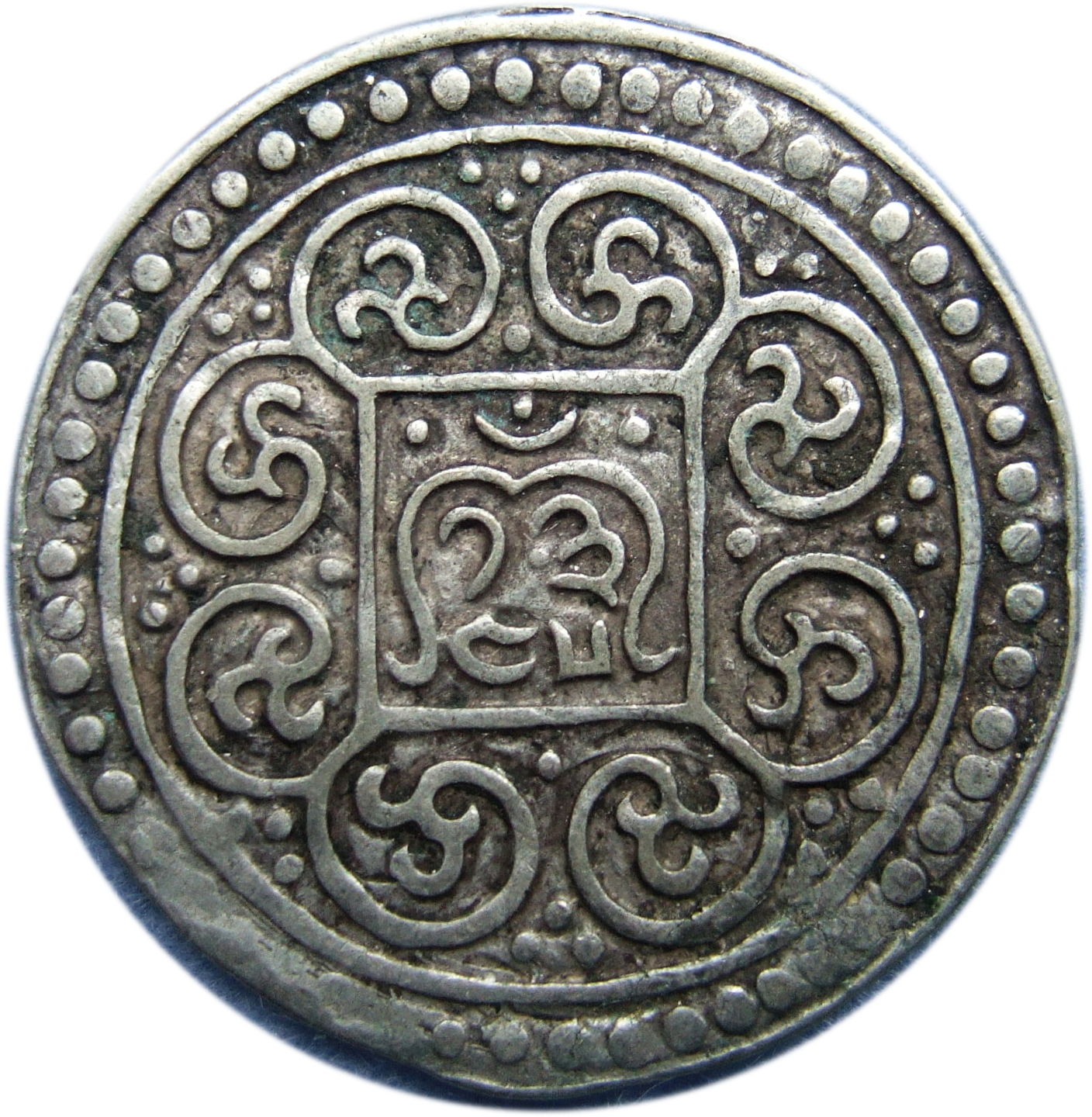
kong par tangka dated 13–45 (= AD 1791), obverse

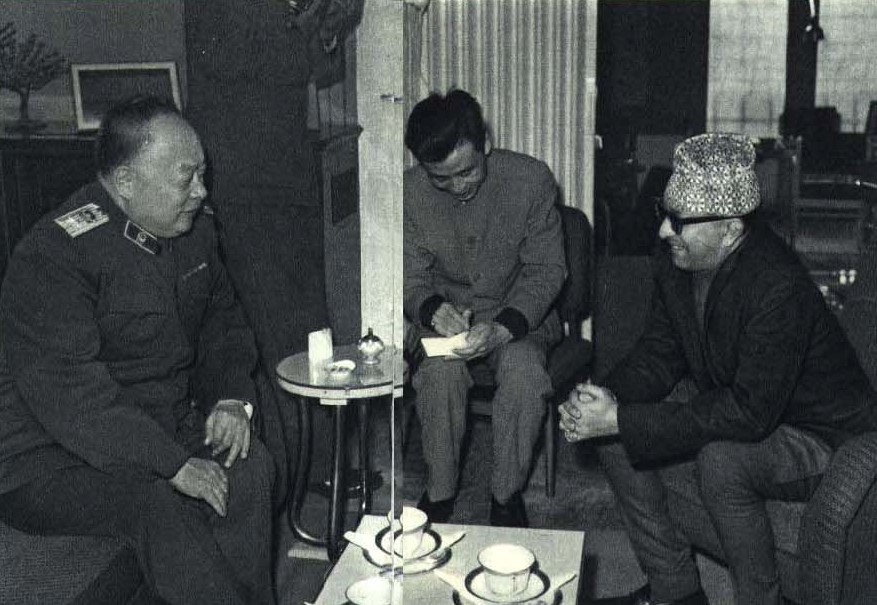
Chinese Foreign Minister Chen Yi meeting with King Mahendra in 1965.

In 1789, the Tibetan government stopped the usage of Nepalese coins for trade in Tibet, citing purity concerns over the copper and the silver coins minted by the Nepalese government, which led to the first Tibet-Nepal War. A resounding victory of Gorkha forces over Tibetans in the first Tibet-Nepal War left the Lhasa Durbar with no choice but to ask for assistance from the Qing Emperor in Peking which led to the first Sino-Nepalese War. In the immediate aftermath of the Sino-Nepalese War (1789–1792), Nepal was forced to sign the 'Treaty of Betrawati' which stipulated that the Government of Nepal was required to make payment of tribute to Qing court in Peking once every five years, after the defeat of Gurkha forces by the Qing army in Tibet.

The 'Treaty of Betrawati' signed by Nepal and Tibet on October 2, 1792, stipulated that both Nepal and Tibet recognize the suzerainty of the Qing Emperor Jiaqing, and further, stated that the Qing court would be obliged to help Nepal defend against any external aggression. However, during the Anglo-Nepalese War (1814–16), the Qing Emperor refused the Nepalese government's request to provide support to Nepalese forces, and, the latter's defeat led to the establishment of the British Empire in India. Then after, Nepal initiated a policy of balancing the influence of Imperial China and British India. Through the tenth quinquennial mission to China (1837), under the leadership of Chautariya Pushkar Shah, the Nepalese government again requested the Daoguang Emperor court to either send troops or a subsidy of Twenty million rupees to oppose the British. However, the Nepalese delegation was said to have been met with a stern refusal of its petition for monetary support, and instructed by the Qing court to stop further hostilities against the British.

Soon after Nepal's defeat in the Anglo-Nepalese war, from 1840 onward, Tibetan government again stopped the use of Nepalese coins for trade. In an attempt to preserve the lucrative coin export business and trade advantages, the Nepalese Kingdom, under the leadership of Jung Bahadur Rana again invaded Tibet in 1855 during the second Nepalese-Tibetan War, and raided the Tashilhunpo Monastery in Shigatse, home to the Panchen Lama at that time. The invading Nepalese army was ordered to vacate the occupied Tibetan territories by the Qing Court, which was rapidly losing its hold over frontier territories due to turmoil inside China proper. Nepal's refusal to hand back the control of Tashilhunpo Monastery led to the second Sino-Nepalese War which resulted in a stalemate; a major setback for Tibetans, ultimately culminating into the Treaty of Thapathali on March 24, 1856. Through the Treaty of Thapathali, Nepal expressed commitment to help Tibet in the event of foreign aggression while authorities in Tibet were obliged to pay the Nepalese government a sum of Nepalese Rupees 10,000 every year. Further, Nepalese government stopped paying tribute to the rulers in Beijing after signing the Treaty of Thapathali. The withdrawal of Nepalese forces from Tibetan areas adjacent to Tibet-Nepal border in 1856 provided the Qing court with the opportunity to firmly tighten its grip in and around Lhasa and throughout Tibet. Soon after the Treaty of Thapathali, the Qing court also issued an edict which among other dispositions stipulated the introduction of a new silver coinage in Tibet, struck in the name of the Qianlong Emperor, the then ruler of China, while at the same time, Nepalese coins were completely forbidden in Tibet from then onward.

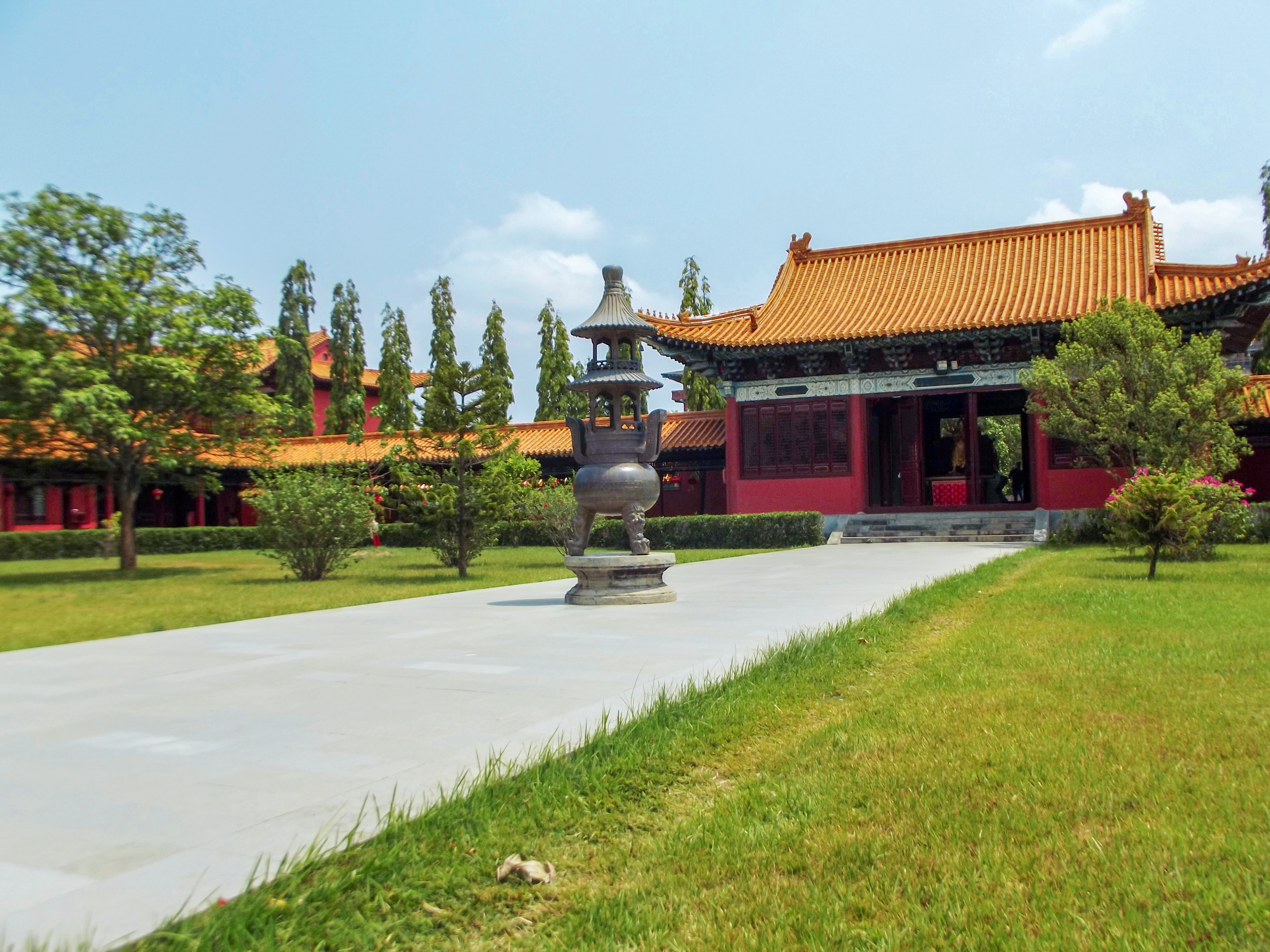
Chinese Buddhist Temple in Lumbini, Nepal

During the late 19th century (1899–1901), after the destabilization of Qing Imperial Court due to the Boxer Rebellion, the British Raj as the unchallenged and the dominant power in the sub-continent exerted total control over China's frontier regions including Nepal. Left with no support from the weakened Qing Court, in the immediate aftermath of Qing Empire's defeat at the hands of an 8-nation alliance, Nepal aligned itself with the British Raj in India and supported the British expedition to Tibet. When China sought to claim Tibet in 1910, Nepal sided with Tibet and Britain and broke relations with China after Tibet drove Chinese forces out in 1911.

The people-to-people ties between Nepalese and Tibetan groups has been affected since 1950, after the annexation of Tibet by the People's Republic of China resulting in the regulated border between Nepal and Tibet (as a part of China). Despite the fluctuating political scenarios in Nepal's neighborhood and within Nepal itself, the influence of Buddhism still remains strong in the day-to-day life of Nepalese people living in the Himalayan Region. The Buddhist monarchy in The Kingdom of Lo (Upper Mustang), previously a part of the Tibetan Empire but now in Nepal, was terminated only in 2008. The area of Lo Manthang, however, still remains quasi-restricted to foreigners.

== Diplomatic relations and Nepalese neutrality ==
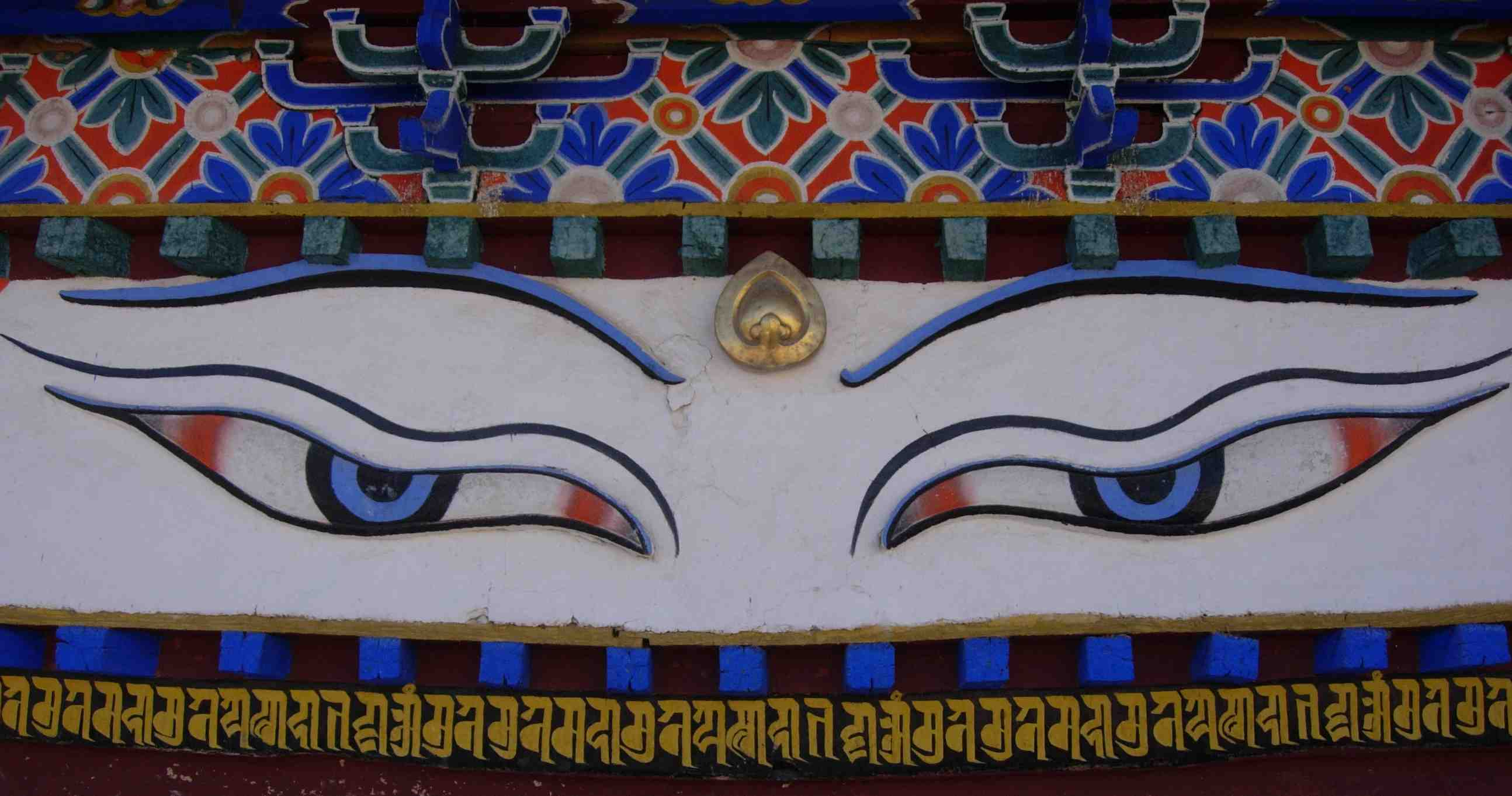
Painted eyes and writing in Nepalese script below on the Kumbum Stupa in Gyantse.

Nepal's Diplomatic relations with China has a long history. One of the famous and most talked about result of such diplomacy is the introduction of pagoda architecture to China by Nepal. In 1260 CE during the Yuan dynasty, Nepalese craftsmen Araniko, on the decree of Emperor Kublai Khan, traveled to Shangdu and built the a stupa better known as White Dagoba in Beijing, which was the largest structure in Beijing at that time. This Stupa built on pagoda architecture was a milestone for the introduction of the architecture. The other result is the introduction of Spinach to China. It is said that Spinach was introduced to China via Nepal. Spinach seeds were first gifted by Narendra Dev, a king of Licchavi Dynasty of Nepal to Emperor Taizong of Tang.

Nepal was historically influenced by India, including the period 1842 to 1945. As the strength of the People's Republic of China grew, Nepal developed greater room for diplomatic maneuver.

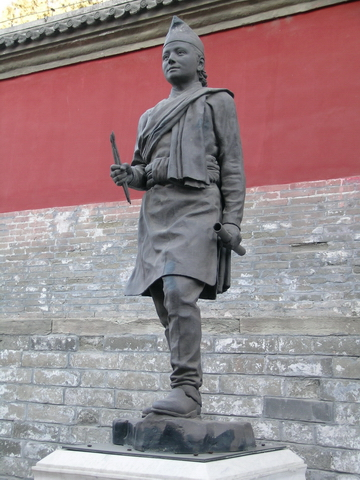
Statue of Araniko at the Miaoying Temple, Beijing

However, the 1950 military occupation of Tibet by the People's Liberation Army raised significant concerns of security and territorial integrity in Nepal, drawing Nepal into a close relationship with extensive economic and military ties with Republic of India. China ordered restrictions on the entry of Nepalese pilgrims and contacts with Tibet. The 1950 Indo-Nepal Treaty of Peace and Friendship that had established a close Indo-Nepalese relationship on commerce, and foreign relations, was increasingly resented in Nepal, which began seeing it as an encroachment of its sovereignty and an unwelcome extension of Indian influence; the deployment of an Indian military mission in Nepal in the 1950s and unabated migration of millions of bihari Indians into Nepal's Terai region increased these concerns.

In 1955, Nepal restored diplomatic relations with the People's Republic of China and exchanged resident ambassadors by 1960. In 1956, both nations signed a new treaty terminating the Treaty of Thapathali of 1856 and Nepal recognized Tibet as a part of China. In 1960, Nepal and China signed a boundary settlement agreement and a separate 'Sino-Nepal Treaty of Peace and Friendship'. Nepal also began supporting the change of China's seat in the United Nations.

In December 1960, Nepalese King Mahendra executed a coup and dismissed the parliamentary government of Nepal. India supported the deposed parliamentary government, and blockaded Nepal in fall 1962. Soon afterwards, the Sino-Indian war broke out, and Indian losses to China made it unwilling to risk further confrontation with Nepal; India lifted the blockade.

From the early 1960s until 1973, the United States Central Intelligence Agency trained and financed Tibetan guerillas operating in opposition to China from two districts in Nepal. The United States ended its support for these guerillas following the 1972 visit by Richard Nixon to China, and Nepal under King Birendra suppressed the guerillas.

== Economic relations ==
In the late 1970s after the accession of Kingdom of Sikkim by India, King Birendra proposed Nepal as a "zone of peace" between India and China and in the 1980s, Nepal began importing Chinese weaponry. When the United States, United Kingdom and India refused to supply arms to the regime of King Gyanendra of Nepal, who had assumed direct rule to suppress the Maoist insurgency during the Nepalese civil war (1996–2006), China responded by dispatching arms to Nepal, in spite of the ideological affinity of the Maoists with China. After the peace process and national elections in Nepal in 2008, the new Maoist-led government announced its intentions to scrap Nepal's 1950 treaty with India, indicating a stronger move towards closer ties with China.

Nepal strongly supported China's successful 2007 application as an observer to SAARC.

Nepal has been a major beneficiary of China's increased focus on developing southwest China, and Nepal-China trade increased by a factor of five from 2009 to 2012. Nepal has been a beneficiary of increased Chinese foreign aid to south Asia since the mid-2000s, including Chinese financing for a railway from Kathmandu to Lhasa. In 2021, the China International Development Cooperation Agency pledged to finance development projects in fifteen northern district of Nepal through the "Northern Region Border Development Programme".

Nepal joined the Belt and Road Initiative (BRI) in 2017. The BRI has strengthened China's relations with Nepal. The China-Nepal-India Economic Corridor (CNIEC) was proposed by China in April 2018. It is an extension of the agreed upon China-Nepal Trans-Himalayan Multi-dimensional Connectivity Network into India. While China and Nepal have shown favourable reactions towards CNIEC, India is "indifferent". This indifference is postulated to stem from CNIEC being a part of the BRI, China's growing influence over Nepal, and an end to "India's monopoly over Nepal's transit points and Nepal's attempt to end its dependency on India". Critics have described Nepal's Pokhara Airport and the Trans-Himalayan Multi-dimensional Connectivity Network, as potential "debt traps."

As of 2021, Nepal has received US$2,000,000,000 through the BRI.

Effective 1 December 2024, China eliminated tariffs for goods imported from all of the countries that the United Nations categorizes as least developed and with which China has diplomatic relations, including Nepal.

== Political Relations ==
On April 13, 2026, Chinese Ambassador Zhang Maoming met Nepalese Home Minister Sudan Gurung to seek assurances that Nepal would not engage with the swearing-in of Tibetan exile leader Sikyong Penpa Tsering, citing concerns over Tibetan and Taiwanese activities. Nepal reaffirmed its commitment to the “One China” policy, highlighting Beijing's influence over its handling of Tibet-related matters

On 6 August 2026, Nepal cancelled the 17th International Association for Tibetan Studies (IATS) seminar, which was scheduled in Kathmandu .The decision was reported as being linked to Chinese concerns over the seminar. However, the International Association for Tibetan Studies president Françoise Robin later stated that the conference would proceed online instead. Chinese Ambassador Zhang Maoming had earlier told the senior Nepalese officials to be cautious. It was feared that pro-Tibet activists could use the conference for protests and the risk of self-immolations.

== Transportation ==
The Araniko Highway was built in the 1960s with help from the Chinese on an older yak track. They also planned to expand the road in 2012, but keeping the route open was made more difficult by landslides from monsoons. The road became a conduit for a large amount of trade between China and Nepal, and also for some trade between India and China when it is open.

In 2007–08, China began construction of a 770-kilometre railway connecting the Tibetan capital of Lhasa with the Nepalese border town of Khasa, connecting Nepal to China's wider national railway network. In a meeting between Chinese and Nepalese officials on 25 April 2008, the Chinese delegation announced the intention to extend the Qingzang railway to Zhangmu (Nepalese: Khasa) on the Nepalese border. Nepal had requested that the railway be extended to enable trade and tourism between the two nations. On the occasion of the Nepalese premier's visit to China it was reported that construction will be completed by 2020. The section Lhasa-Shigatse opened in August 2014.

An air route exists between Lhasa and Kathmandu.

In June 2018, China and Nepal announced an agreement to connect Xigazê, Tibet Autonomous Region with Kathmandu, via a new railroad.

In September 2018, Nepalese commerce ministry official Rabi Shankar Sainju announced that China had granted Nepal access to the ports of Tianjin, Shenzhen, Lianyungang, and Zhanjiang, as well as land ports at Lanzhou, Lhasa and Xigatse. Access to Chinese ports reduces Nepal's dependence on India for commerce, a dependence that was highlighted by the 2015 Nepal blockade.

In November 2023, a dry port was opened at the Korala mountain pass.

== Territorial disputes ==
In November 2019, after Nepal's parliament formally approved a map depicting Kalapani within Nepal, per Indian media sources Nepal's Survey Department reported of Chinese encroachment on 36 hectares in four districts of Nepal (Sankhuwasabha, Rasuwa, Sindhupalchowk and Humla) and that there was a further risk of losing several hundred hectares of land.

Indian media sources also reported that Nepal Agriculture department's documented massive road development projects in the Tibet Autonomous Region that have caused Sumjung, Kam Khola and Arun rivers to change their course and expand China's boundary into northern territories of Nepal, and warned that even more Nepalese land would be encroached by the Chinese if the rivers continue to change course. Nepalese government later on officially released a statement stating, "Why would the Agriculture department release report related to the boundaries of Nepal?" Indian media sources also said that China could set up Border Observation Post of Armed Police in these encroached territories.

In May 2020, Chinese media, calling Mount Everest (known in Nepal as Sagarmatha) as Mount Qomolangma claimed it as part of Chinese territory, sparking outrage among Nepalese citizens. In 1961, King Mahendra, the then ruler of Nepal, had announced that Mount Everest falls squarely inside Nepal. Opposition leaders have criticized Prime Minister Oli for not raising up the Sino-Nepal border issue.

In September 2020, Nepalese media reported that a border pillar in Humla District of Nepal was missing, and China had constructed 11 buildings 2 kilometers inside Nepalese territory. This was supported by Deputy CDO of Humla and Provincial MLA Jeevan Bahadur Shahi, who collected proofs by making days-long visits and letting them go public. He got warning and threat from Chinese side in return. When the Chief District Officer of Nepal went to inspect the place based on concerns raised by locals, he was told by Chinese security officials that the buildings were within Chinese territory which extends one kilometre further south from where the buildings are located. In the same month, Nepalese foreign ministry confirmed that buildings are constructed one kilometre inside of Chinese border.

The government of Nepal tends to deny or downplay any territorial disputes with China for fear of losing economic favors. In November 2020, the government of Nepal refuted the accusation from Jeevan Bahadur Shahi. Sewa Lamsal of Nepal's foreign ministry said land encroachment by Chinese construction was untrue. Both the Chinese and Nepalese governments denied there were any territorial disputes between the two countries. In October 2024, The New York Times reported that the Nepalese government documented border infringements by China but subsequently censored the report.

In July 2026, residents of Nepal's Bajhang district expressed concern over restrictions along the Nepal–Tibet border, saying the tighter controls had disrupted traditional trade, seasonal grazing, and pilgrimages to Lake Mansarovar. Nepali officials said they had raised the issue with China.

== Human rights ==
In June 2020, Nepal was one of 53 countries that backed the Hong Kong national security law at the United Nations. In October 2022, Nepal voted against UN Human Rights Council debate on human rights violations in China's Xinjiang region. Nepal's take on this was that the issues related to Xinjiang were not related to human rights but rather about counterterrorism and a move against separatism.

Tibetan Nepalese have reportedly been pressured by Chinese border security not to display images of the 14th Dalai Lama.

== See also ==
- Foreign relations of China
- Foreign relations of Nepal
