= China–Nepal border =

International boundary in South Asia

China–Nepal border 中国－尼泊尔边界 नेपाल-चीन सिमाना
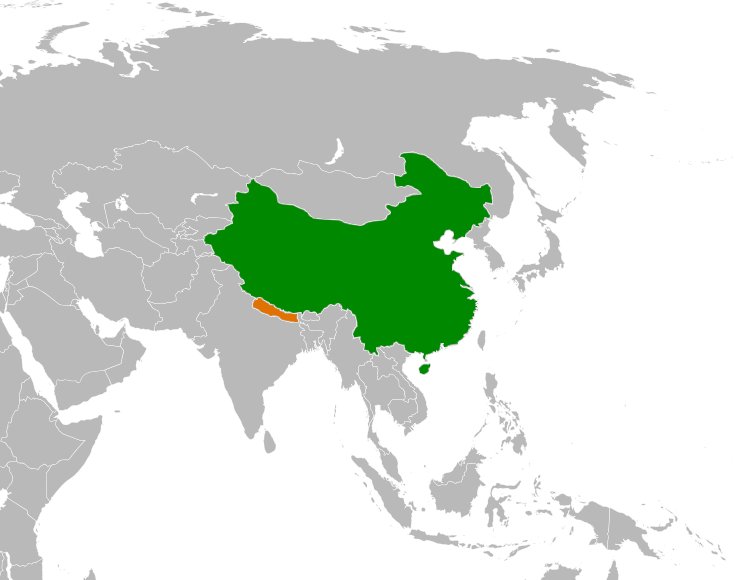

Characteristics
- Entities: China; Nepal
- Length: 1,389 km (863 mi)

History
- Established: 1956; China–Nepal Agreement
- Current shape: 28 April 1960; Sino-Nepalese Treaty of Peace and Friendship
- Treaties: Agreement on Maintaining Friendly Relations between the People's Republic of China and the Kingdom of Nepal; Sino-Nepalese Treaty of Peace and Friendship

Chinese and Nepalese boundary markers

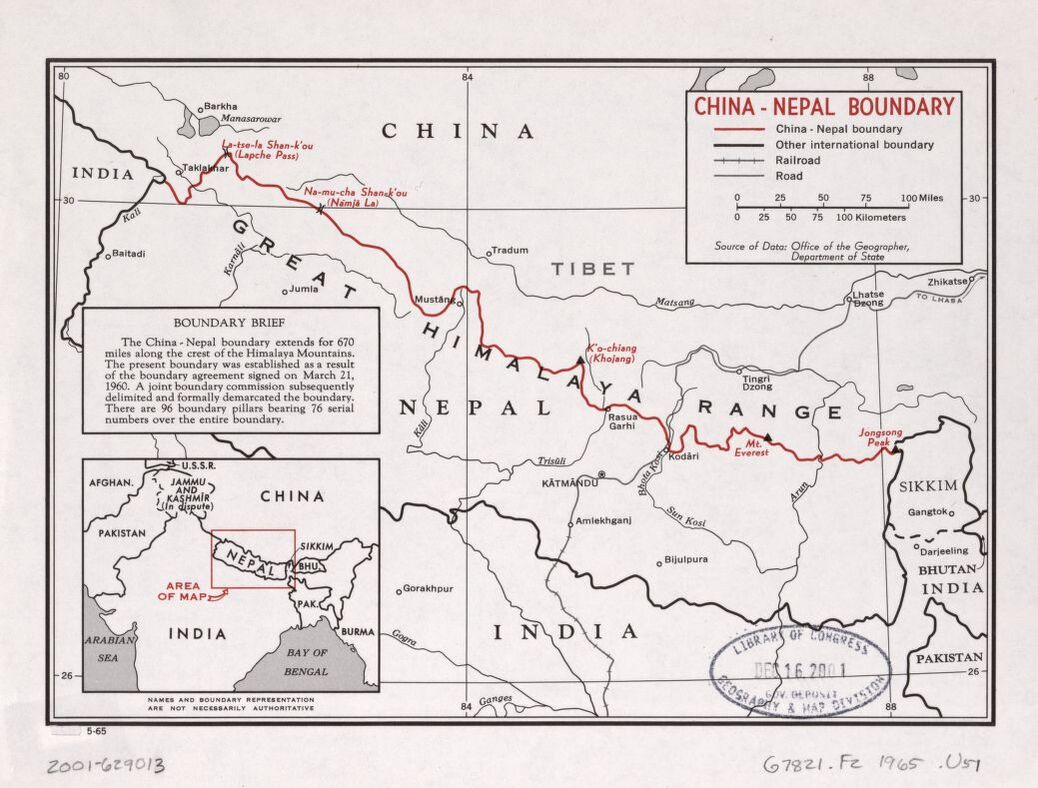
Map of the China–Nepal border

The China–Nepal border is the international boundary between the Tibet Autonomous Region of China, and Nepal. It is 1,389 kilometres (863 mi) in length and runs in a northwest–southeast direction along the Himalayan mountain range, including Mount Everest, the world's highest mountain.

The line of the border has changed dramatically over time, especially when considering events such as the 1951 Chinese annexation of Tibet. Some of the most significant developments of modern times are the signing of the "Agreement on Maintaining Friendly Relations between the People's Republic of China and the Kingdom of Nepal" in 1956 and the Sino-Nepalese Treaty of Peace and Friendship in 1960, both of which formally recognised Tibet as a part of China and confirmed the limits of the countries of China and Nepal as they are known today.

== Description ==
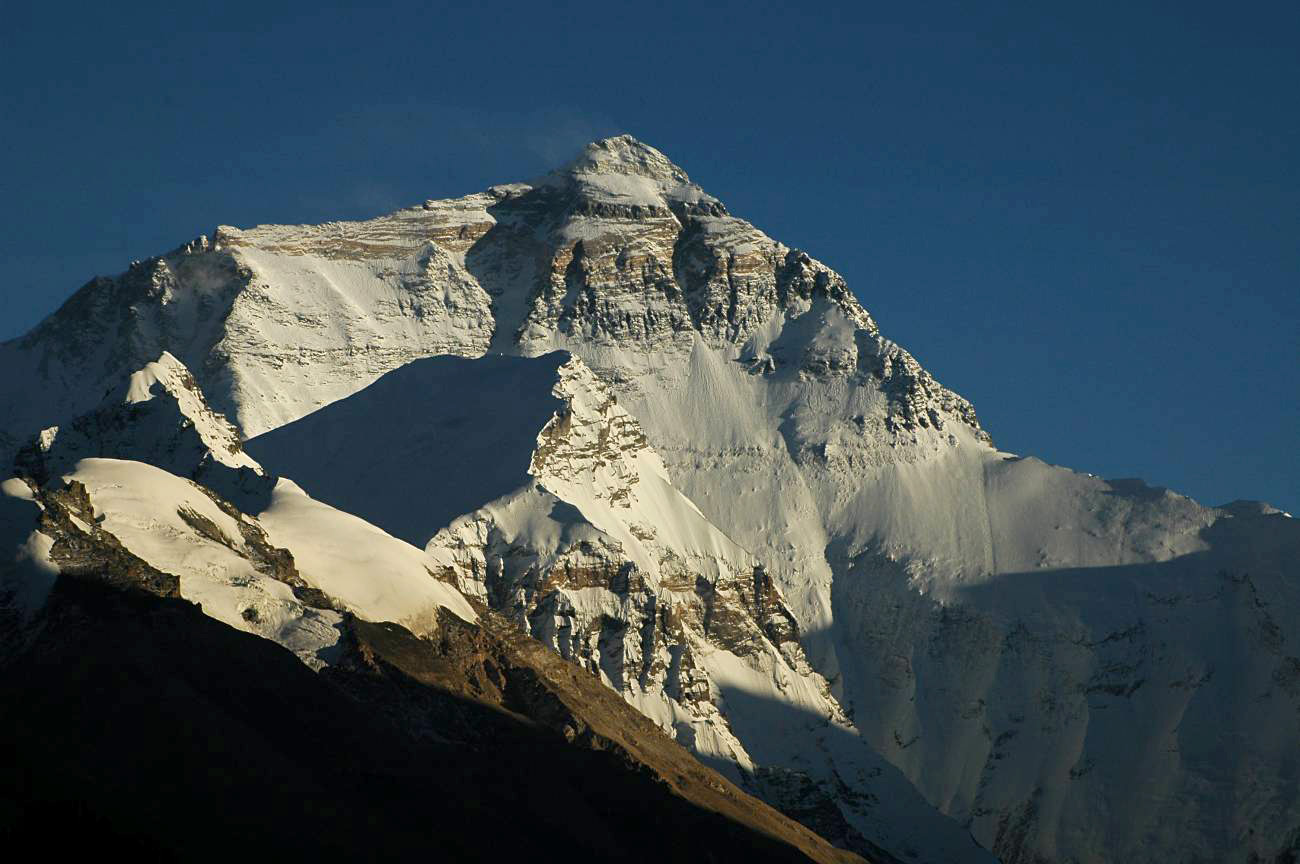
Mount Everest, as seen from Ronguk monastery in Tibet

The border starts in the west near the Tinkar Pass in the Sudurpashchim Province of Nepal. Article 1 of the 1961 boundary treaty defines the starting point as "the point where the watershed between the Kali River and the Tinkar River meets the watershed between the tributaries of the Mapchu (Karnali) River on the one hand and the Tinkar River on the other hand." This point corresponds to the head of the Tinkar Valley, in the Byans region of Darchula District. The Byans region was historically part of Kumaon and was divided between British India and Nepal by the Treaty of Sugauli (1816), with the villages of Chhangru and Tinkar being transferred to Nepal. Border Pillar No. 1 of the China–Nepal border was placed at this location.

It then proceeds south-east to the Urai Pass and then north-east, briefly utilising the Karnali River, before turning to the south-east at the Lapche Pass. It then proceeds in that general direction over various mountains crests in the Himalayan range, including Mount Everest, Mount Makalu and Mount Salasungo, as passes such as the Manja, Thau, Marima, Pindu, Gyala, Lajing and Popti Passes. It terminates at the eastern tripoint with India on Jongsong Peak.

== History ==
The border region has historically existed at the edges of various Nepali, Indian and Tibetan kingdoms. Cross-border trade between Nepalis and Tibetans has existed for centuries, for example in wool, tea, spices and salt. Though various Nepali-Tibetan treaties were signed in the 18th-19th centuries, these concerned the ownership of often vaguely defined territories rather than with delimiting a precise boundary.

In the western sector, the Byansi people of the Tinkar Valley and Kuthi Valley traded with the Tibetan town of Taklakot (Burang) through the Tinkar Pass and Lipu Lekh. Following the Sino-Indian War in 1962, India closed the Lipu Lekh pass, and Byansi trade shifted to the Tinkar Pass on the Nepali side until Lipu Lekh was partially reopened in 1992.

In 1950–51, the People's Republic of China annexed Tibet, and thereby inherited the somewhat confused situation along the boundary. On 21 March 1960 a border treaty was signed which recognised the "traditional customary line" and created a joint boundary commission to delimit a more precise border. Having completed their work, a final boundary treaty was signed on 5 October 1961. The border was then demarcated on the ground with pillars, and a final protocol signed on 23 January 1963.

The government of Nepal tends to deny or downplay any territorial disputes with China for fear of losing economic favors. In 2021, the Nepali government documented border infringements by China but subsequently censored the report.

== Border disputes ==
The western China–Nepal–India tripoint is disputed between Nepal and India since 1990s as part of Kalapani territory. In 2015, the Nepalese parliament objected to the agreement between India and China to trade through Lipulekh stating that 'it violates Nepal's sovereign rights over the disputed territory'. After Indian prime minister Narendra Modi's visit to China in 2015, India and China agreed to open a trading post in Lipulekh, raising objections from Nepal.

India maintains that the tripoint lies at the Tinkar Pass, consistent with the 1961 treaty's description of the watershed between the Kali and Tinkar rivers. Nepal's 2020 political map, which incorporated Kalapani, Lipulekh and Limpiyadhura as Nepali territory, would place the tripoint further to the north-west, at the headwaters of the Kuthi Yankti river near Limpiyadhura.

In November 2020, Nepali politicians claimed China had annexed more than 150 ha (370 acres) of Nepalese land. The Nepali government in September 2021 formed a team under Home Ministry Joint Secretary Jaya Narayan Acharya to study the dispute in Limi of Namkha Rural Municipality of Humla District. The committee comprised Deputy Director General of the Survey Department Sushil Dangol, Senior Superintendent of Nepal Police Umesh Raj Joshi, Senior Superintendent of Armed Police Force Pradip Kumar Pal, Joint Director of National Investigation Department Kishor Kumar Shrestha and Home Ministry Secretary Acharya. The team presented its report on September 26, concluding that the allegation was true. The creation of a joint task force for dispute resolution was suggested. It was also recommended that Nepali security forces be stationed in the area to guarantee security.

In addition, a team led by NC Karnali Provincial Assembly party and former minister Jeevan Bahadur Shahi had submitted a report on the matter, requesting the return of the Nepalese land. The issue was raised and supported by NC vice-president and former Home minister Bimalendra Nidhi who was Deputy Prime minister in Second Dahal cabinet.

In early 2022, the Nepali government report was leaked. The report indicated that the buildings previously thought to have been constructed inside Nepal were on the Chinese side of the border, but found that China was building a fence around a border pillar, and attempting to construct a canal and a road on Nepali soil.

== Border crossings ==
In 2012, Nepal and China agreed to open new ports of entry, to a total of six official ports. Three of the ports are designated as international ports, while three others are only designated for bilateral trade.

The border crossing between Zhangmu and Kodari on the Friendship Highway has been in operation since 1968. In 2014, the border crossing at Rasuwa Fort (Rasuwagadhi) was opened for commerce and then for foreign nationals from 2017. In addition, this border crossing is being considered for a future rail crossing between the two countries.

Other crossings, like the one at Burang-Hilsa near the western tripoint, while not widely accessible have been used for local trade between China and Nepal for many years. Some of those crossings have become so important for local trade that in 2008, when China tightened its border control during the Olympics, villages like Kimathanka faced food shortages due to disruption of local trade. Korala, the latest border crossing to open, started operations in 2023.

Ports of Entry According to 2012 Treaty
Treaty Name(Other Name)	Jurisdictions	Status	International Transit	Crossing Location	Border elevation	Maximum inside T.A.R.	Note
Burang–Yari (Xieerwa)	Hilsa, Humla District; Burang, Burang County	Active	Yes	30°09′12″N 81°20′00″E	3,640 m (11,900 ft)	4,720 m (15,500 ft)	
Lektse—Nechung (Korala)	Lo Manthang, Mustang District; Yagra, Zhongba County	Active	No	29°19′24″N 83°59′09″E	4,620 m (15,200 ft)		
Gyirong–Rasuwa	Rasuwa Gadhi, Rasuwa District; Gyirong, Gyirong County	Active	Yes	28°16′45″N 85°22′43″E	1,850 m (6,100 ft)	5,230 m (17,200 ft)	interrupted and border facilities destroyed by flash flood in August 2026
Zhangmu–Kodari	Tatopani, Sindhupalchok District; Zhangmu, Nyalam County	Active	Yes	27°58′24″N 85°57′50″E	1,760 m (5,800 ft)	5,150 m (16,900 ft)	
Chentang–Kimathanka	Kimathanka, Sankhuwasabha District; Chentang, Dinggyê County	Planned	No	27°51′30″N 87°25′30″E	2,248 m (7,400 ft)		Local trade currently exists
Ri'og–Olangchung Gola (Tipta La)	Olangchung Gola, Taplejung District; Ri'og, Dinggyê County	Planned	No	27°49′00″N 87°44′00″E	5,095 m (16,700 ft)		Local trade currently exists

== Galleries ==
Border crossings from west to east
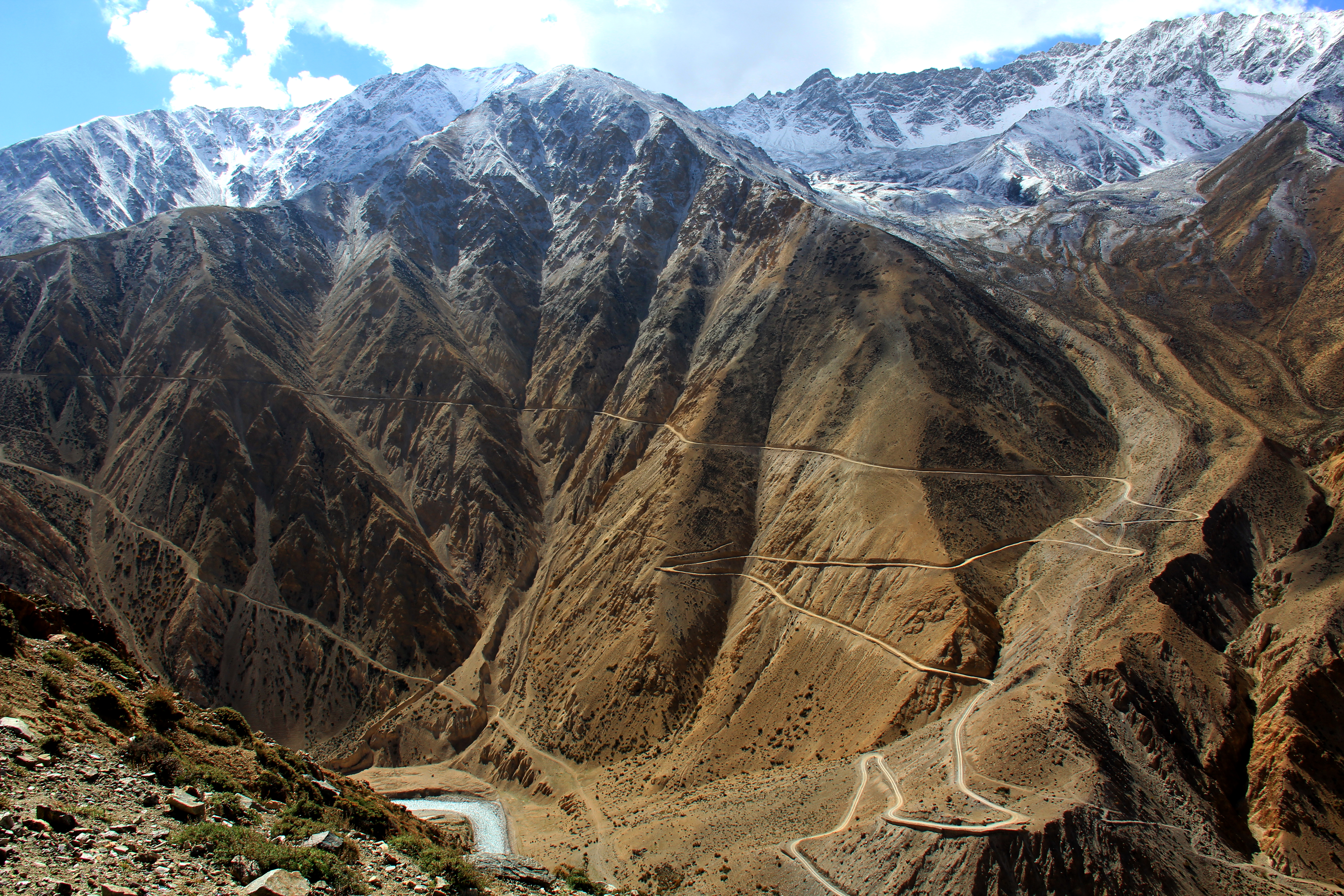
Nara La near the Burang–Hilsa crossing

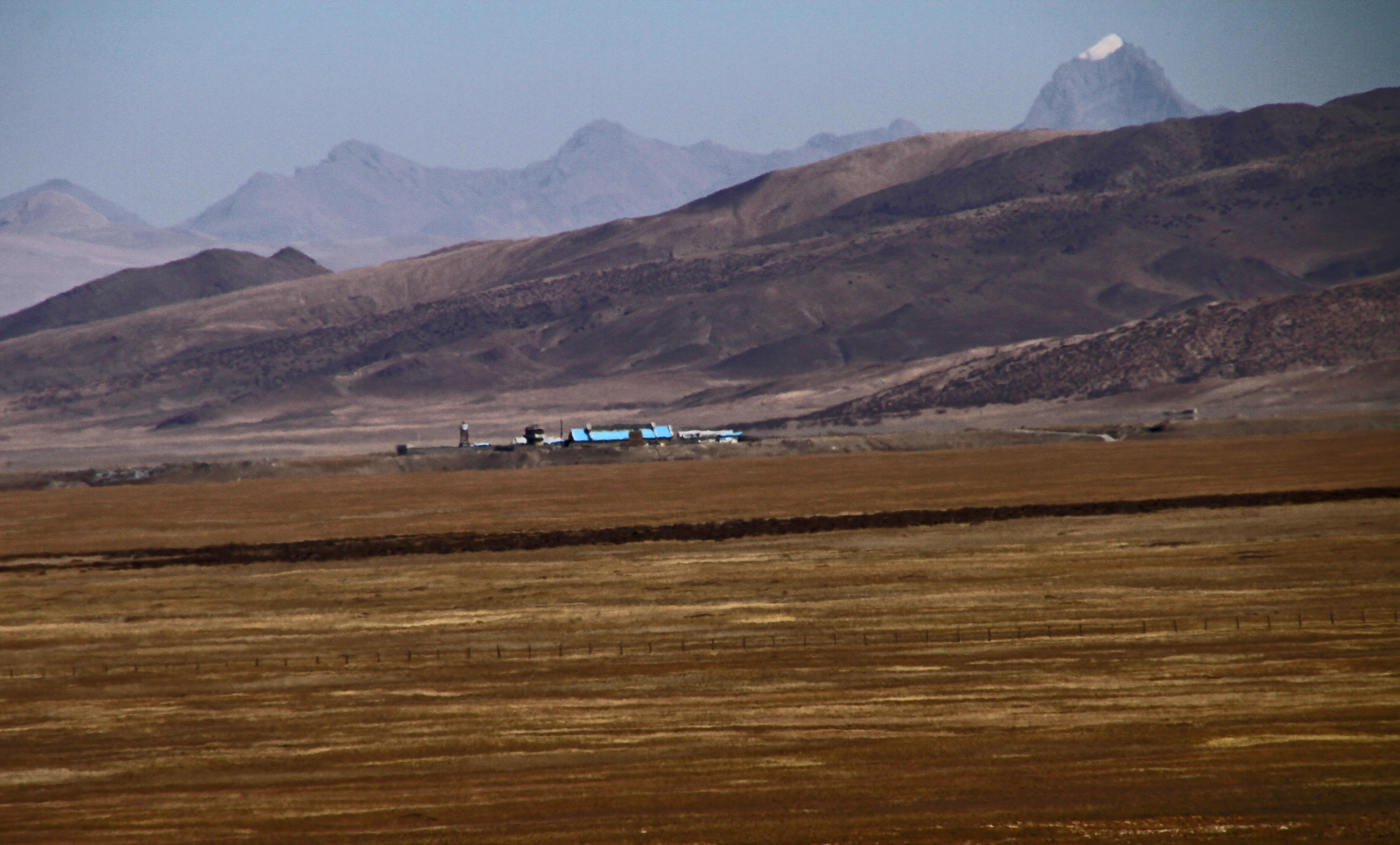
View across the border at PLA border outpost from Lo Manthang near Korala

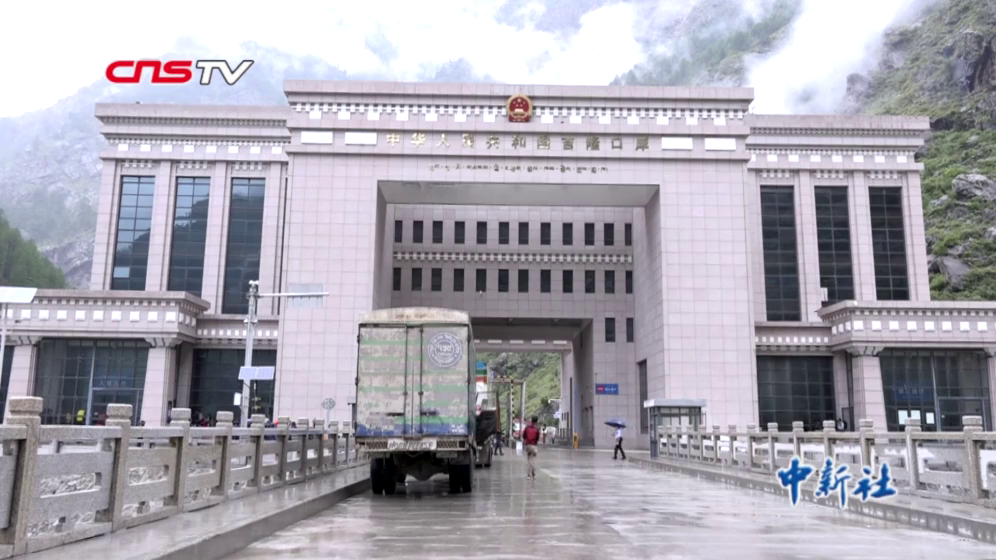
Former Chinese port-of-entry building at Gyirong–Rasuwa crossing (destroyed in 2026)

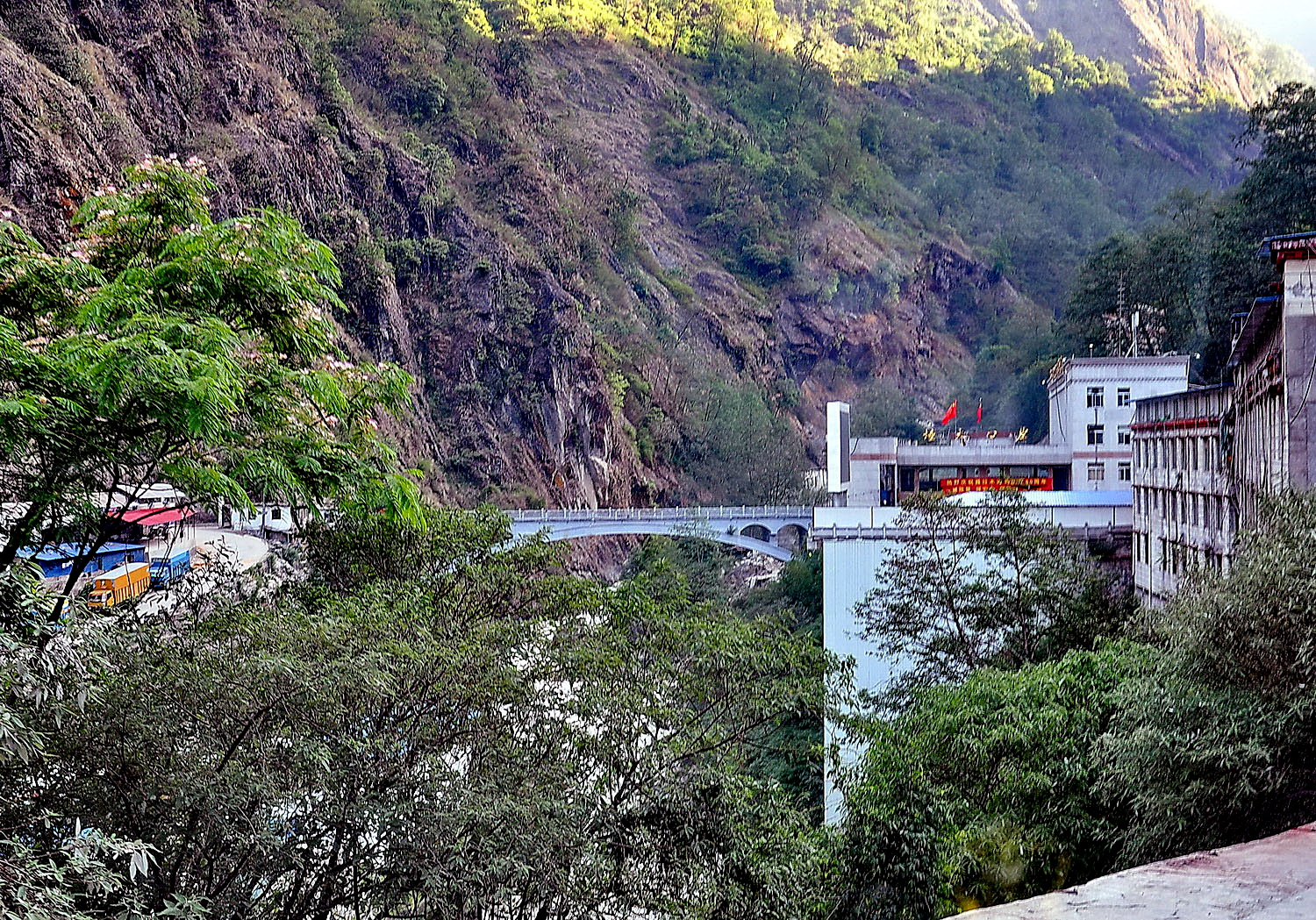
Sino-Nepal Friendship Bridge at the Zhangmu–Kodari crossing

Historical maps of the border from west to east in the International Map of the World and Operational Navigation Chart, middle/late 20th century:

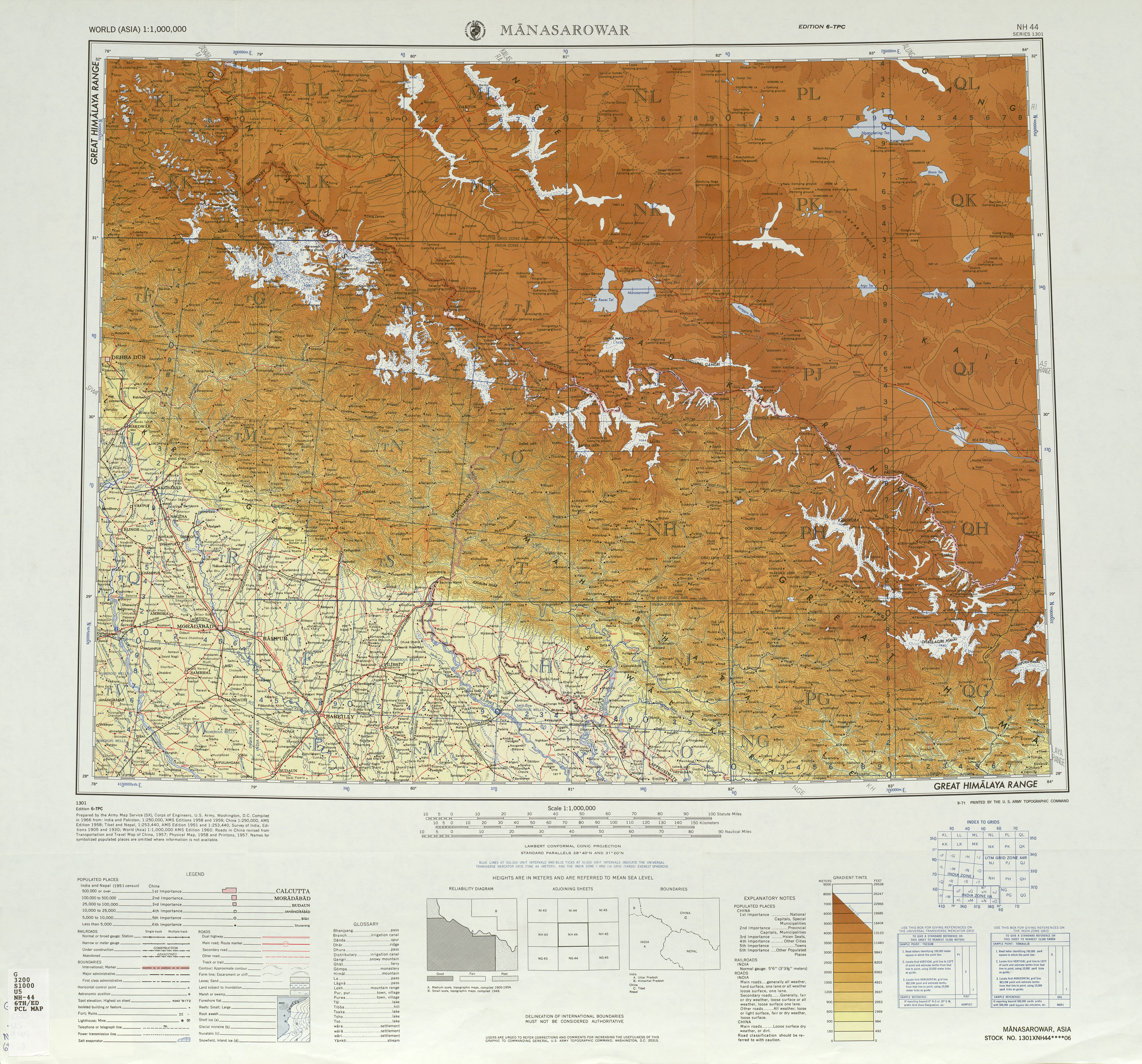

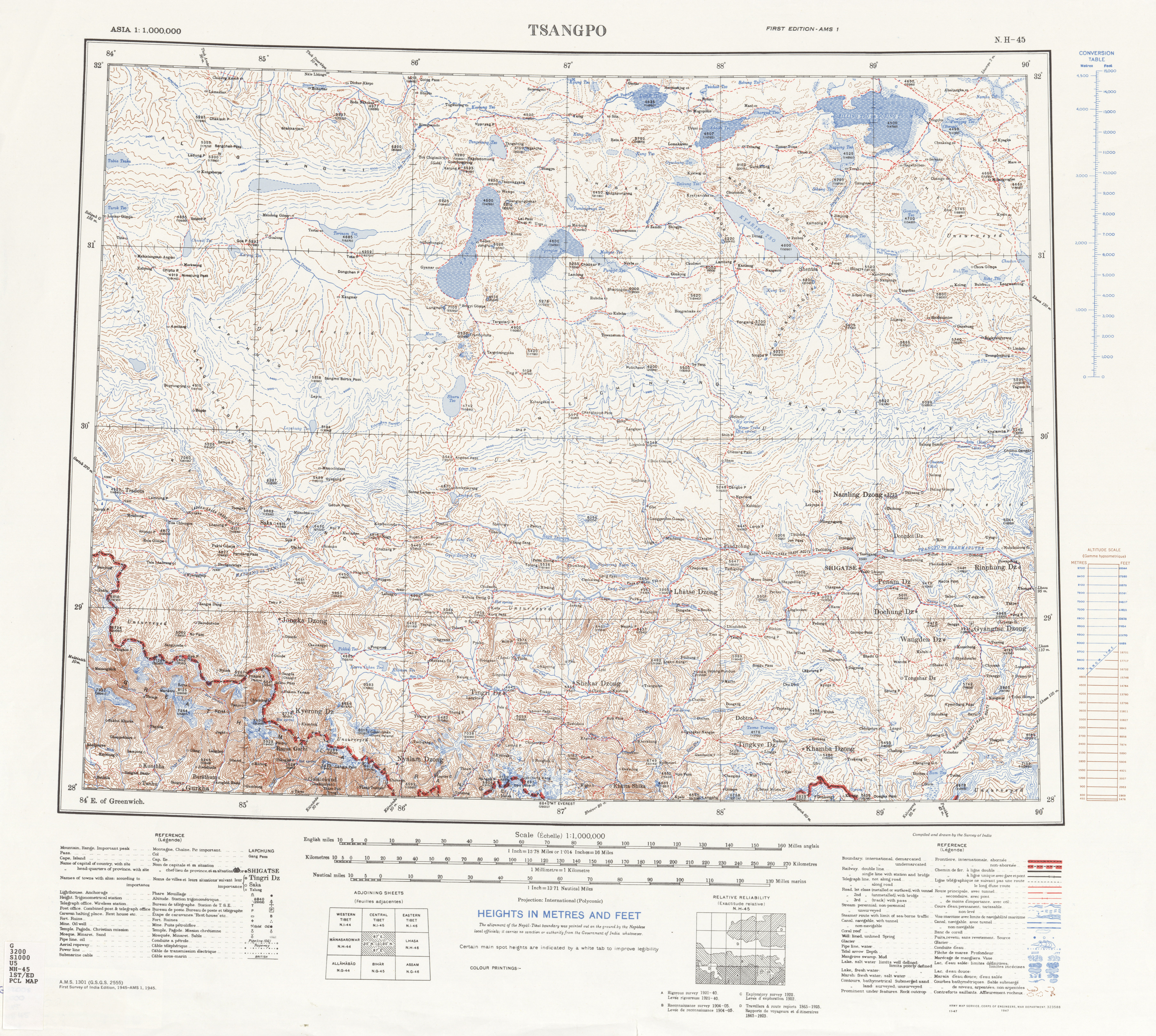

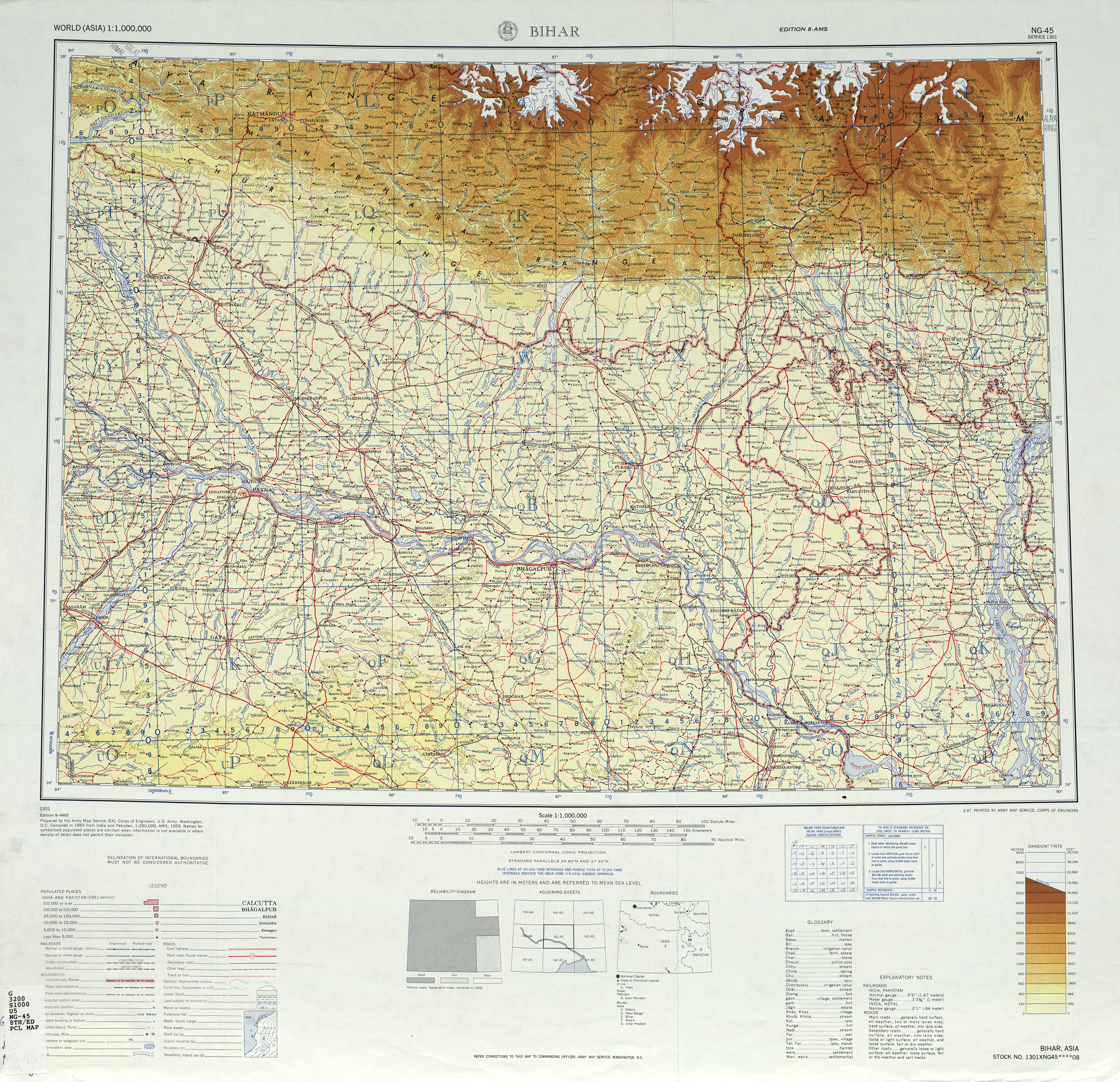

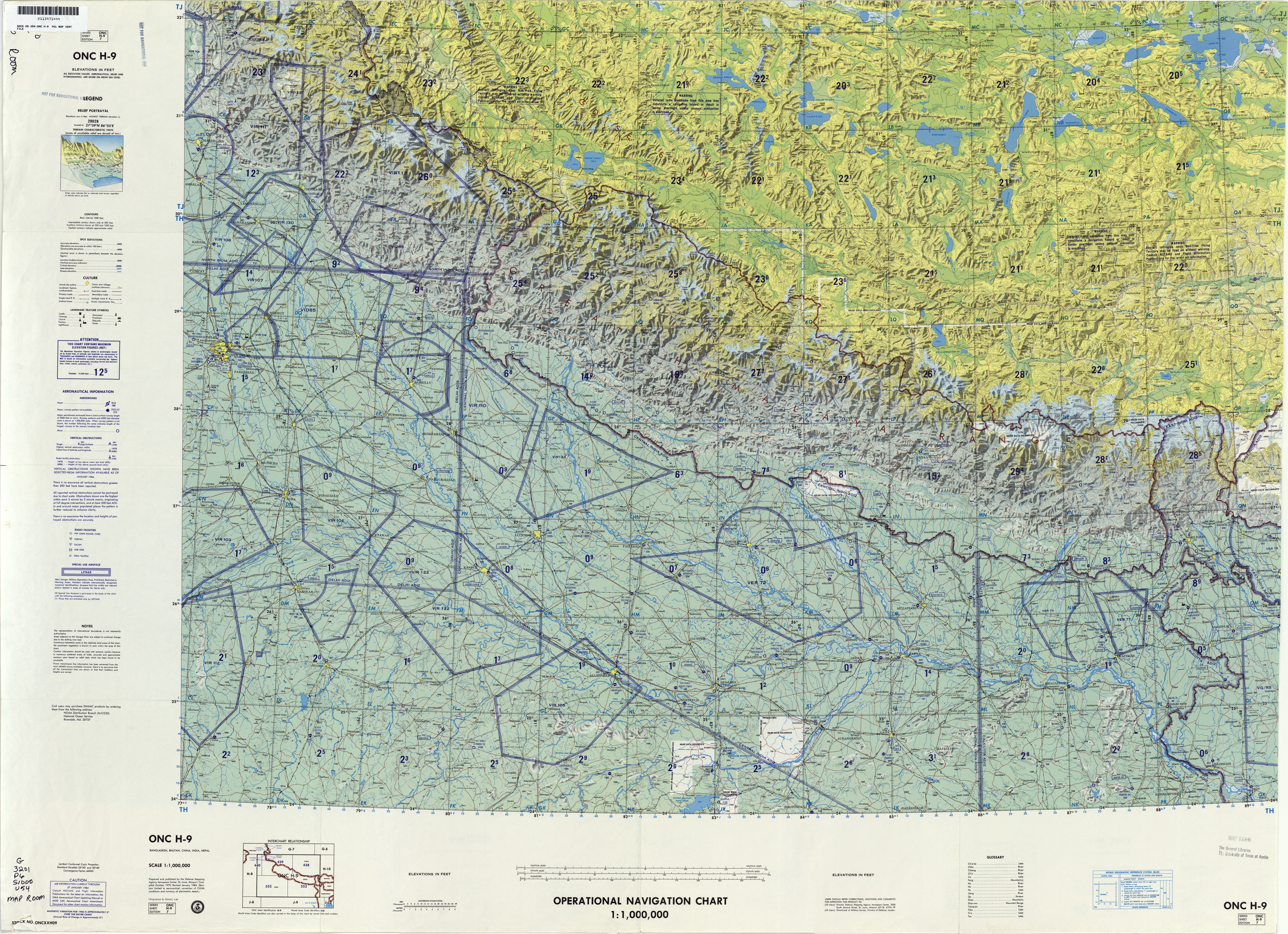

== See also ==
- China-Nepal relations
- India–Nepal relations
- Byans
- Tinkar Valley
- Kalapani territory
- 2026 Nepal floods
