= Como Chamling =

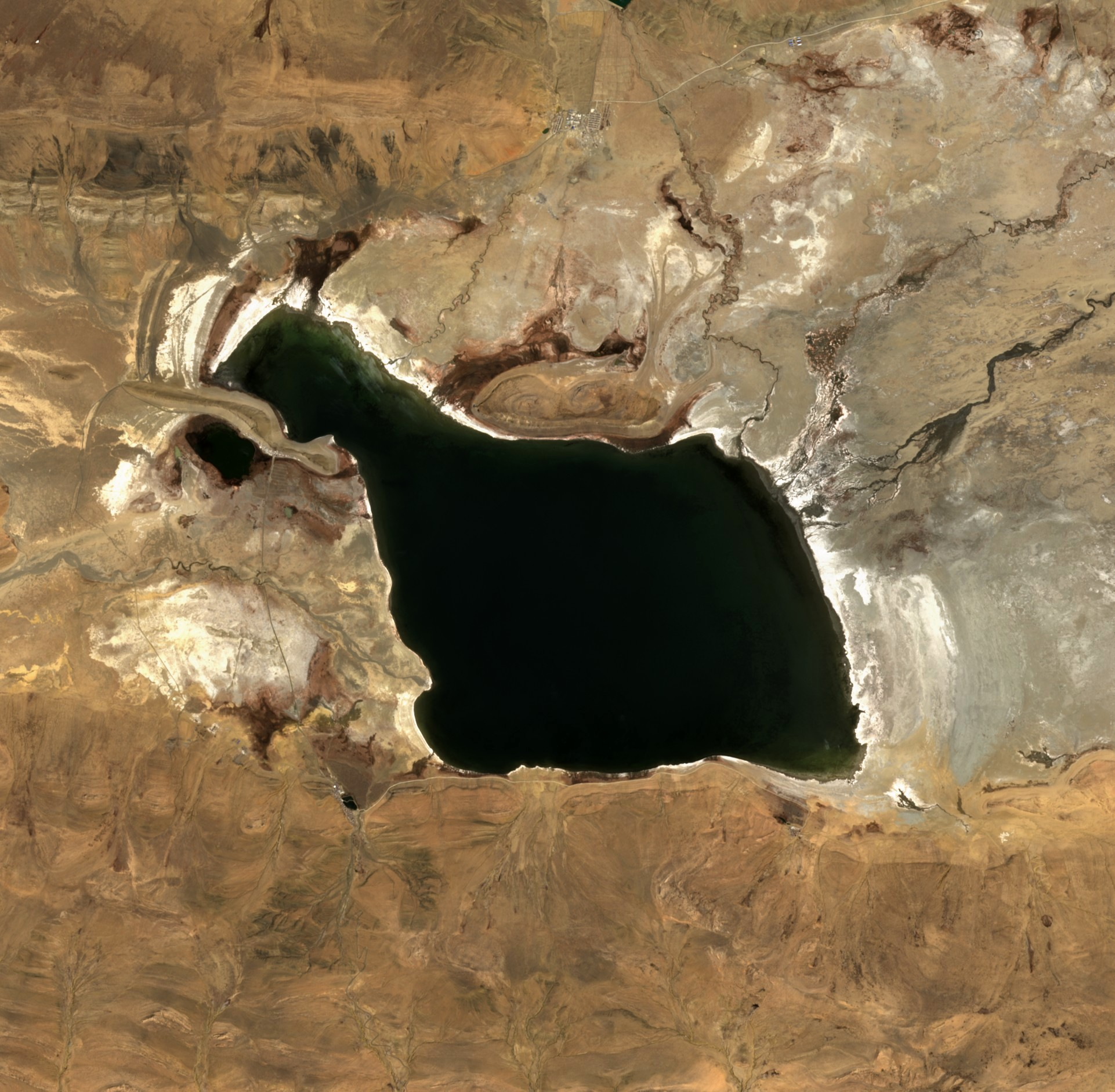
- Sentinel-2 image (2022)

- Location within Tibet
- Location: Dinggyê County, Tibet Autonomous Region, China
- Coordinates: 28°24′04″N 88°13′12″E
- Type: saline lake
- Surface area: 53.2 square kilometers (20.5 sq mi)

Como Chamling

Chinese name
- Traditional Chinese: 錯母折林
- Simplified Chinese: 错母折林
Transcriptions
Standard Mandarin
- Hanyu Pinyin: Cuòmǔ zhélín
- Wade–Giles: Cuomu Zhelin

Tibetan name
- Tibetan: མཚོ་མོ་གྲམ་གླིང
Transcriptions
- Wylie: mtsho mo gram gling
- Tibetan Pinyin: como chamling

Como Chamling (Tibetan: མཚོ་མོ་གྲམ་གླིང; Chinese: 错母折林) is a saline lake in eastern Dinggyê County, Tibet Autonomous Region, China, on the Tibetan Plateau. As of 2007, it has an area of 53.2 square kilometers (20.5 sq mi), down from 66.3 square kilometers (25.6 sq mi) in 1974, although the area of the lake fluctuates, both shrinking and expanding, over time. Most of this fluctuation occurs at the eastern end of the lake. To the north of the lake is both natural pastures and farmland.
