= Sino-Nepalese Treaty of Peace and Friendship =

Official settlement between Nepal and China

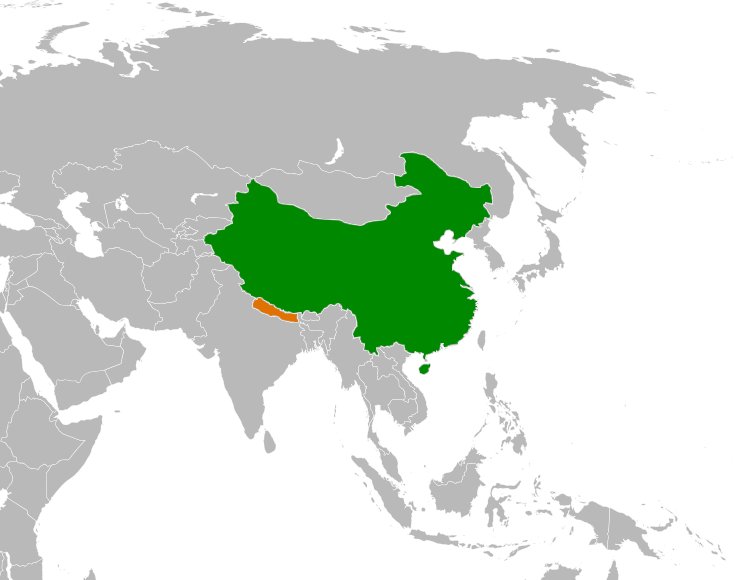
Map showing Nepal (orange) and China (green)

The Sino-Nepalese Treaty of Peace and Friendship is an official settlement between the governments of Nepal and China (Tibet) signed on 28 April 1960, which ratified an earlier agreement on the border between the two neighboring nations. Gerry Van Tronder has argued that this document fitted into an attempt to maintain the image that Beijing was a "powerful but essentially benevolent leader in Asia", following the 1959 Tibetan uprising. Contemporary Nepali, Chinese and Indian commentators have stressed the importance of the treaty in determining Nepal's relationship with China in the past and present.

== Historical background ==
Immediately after India's Independence in 1947, prime ministers (Padma Rana and Mohan Rana) and kings (Tribuhvan) of Nepal maintained a "special relationship" with India compared to China. After the founding of the People's Republic of China in 1949, Premier Zhou Enlai recognised the closeness of India's and Nepal's relationship, apparently trying to reach a settlement over border issues in a meeting between the three nations. India and Nepal's comparatively "special" relationship was formalised in the 1950 Indo-Nepal Treaty of Peace and Friendship, which signalled a relative distancing of relations with Beijing. Perhaps prompted by this, the Chinese Communist Party backed a failed 1952 coup attempt by the Communist Party of Nepal to overthrow the ruling Rana faction. During the period from 1950 to 1955, India was "instrumental in blocking the direct establishment of relations between Nepal and China" (all communications first passing through New Delhi) and wanted to have "reached an understanding with China on Tibet and other Himalayan states" before Nepal "favoured any positive action with China". Nonetheless, a period of gradually increasing democracy in Nepal set the stage for a softening of attitudes towards Beijing, culminating in Nepal and China agreeing to re-establish diplomatic relations at the 1955 Bandung Conference along the Five Principles of Peaceful Coexistence. The resumption of more friendly relations was authenticated by three agreements signed between the countries in 1956, among them the "Agreement on Maintaining Friendly Relations between the People's Republic of China and the Kingdom of Nepal", which terminated the 1856 Treaty of Thapathali and recognised Tibet as an "autonomous region of China", as well as two economic agreements on the conditions for trade between Nepal and Tibet and financial aid for Nepal. This signalled the beginning of Nepal's new monarch Mahendra forging his own foreign policy with China without constant oversight or permission from India. This was further demonstrated through a 1957 proclamation from Chinese Premier Zhou that Nepal needed to broaden their economic interests to ensure their independence, following his visit to the country in the same year.

== Border treaty March 1960 ==
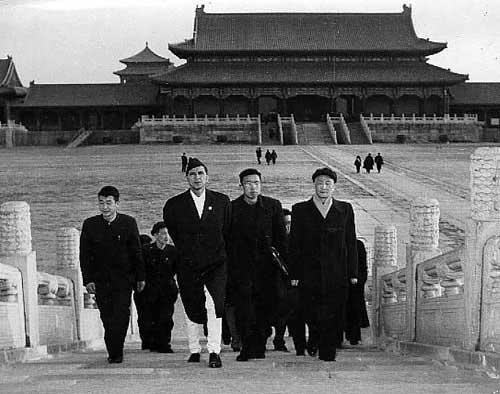
Koirala visiting the Imperial Palace in 1960

The immediate run-up to the signing of the treaty between the governments of Nepal and China was the visit of recently elected Nepalese prime minister B. P. Koirala to China in March 1960. An official communique from the Chinese side detailed that he was first "received" by Mao Tse-tung and Liu Shao chi, before beginning negotiations, with Premier Zhou, Chen Yi, Pan Tzu-li and others on the Chinese side, and Ganesh Man Singh, Surya Prasad Upadhyaya and others on the Nepalese side. Eventually, the two countries signed the Agreement Between the Government of the People's Republic of China and His Majesty's Government of Nepal on the Question of the Boundary Between the Two Countries. This was the key agreement that delineated the border between the two countries in the Himalayas, as well as ceding Tibet to Chinese control. Without this, it is highly unlikely that China would have agreed to the terms of the later treaty of "peace and friendship" in April. This treaty, like the earlier one of 1956, was completed according to the Five Principles. Again, like 1956, another Agreement Between the Government of the People's Republic of China and His Majesty's Government of Nepal on Economic Aid was then passed upon the completion of the territorial proposal. The conditions of this were: "within a period of three years, a free grant of aid of a total value of 100,000,000 (one hundred million) Indian Rupees, without any political conditions attached. This aid does not include the remaining 40,000,000 (forty million) Indian Rupees, provided under the Agreement between China and Nepal on Economic Aid of 1956, which has not yet been used by His Majesty's Government of Nepal". They also approved the creation of their respective embassies in Beijing and Kathmandu after this time. Premier Zhou Enlai then "agreed that they would discuss and sign the Treaty of Peace and Friendship between the two countries during Premier Chou En-lai's visit in Nepal". Although Singh said that "the Indo-Nepalese treaty obliged Nepal to consult with New Delhi before concluding a treaty with China" (presumably under Article II), "they did not do so".

== Text of the April 1960 treaty ==
The text of the treaty is as follows:

The Chairman of the People's Republic of China and His Majesty the King of Nepal, desiring to maintain and further develop peace and friendship between the People's Republic of China and the Kingdom of Nepal. Convinced that the strengthening of good-neighborly relations and friendly co-operation between the People's Republic of China and the Kingdom of Nepal is in accordance with the fundamental interests of the peoples of the two countries and conducive to the consolidation of peace in Asia and the world, have decided for this purpose to conclude the present Treaty in accordance with the Five Principles of peaceful co-existence jointly affirmed by the two countries, and have appointed as their respective Plenipotentiaries: The Chairman of the People's Republic of China: Premier Chou En-lai of the State Council, His Majesty the King of Nepal: Prime Minister Bishweshwar Prasad Koirala. THE above-mentioned Plenipotentiaries, having examined each other's credentials and found them in good and due form, have agreed upon the following:

Article I. The Contracting Parties recognize and respect the independence, sovereignty and territorial integrity of each other.

Article II. The Contracting Parties will maintain and develop peaceful and friendly relations between the People's Republic of China and the Kingdom of Nepal. They undertake to settle all disputes between them by mean of peaceful negotiation.

Article III. The Contracting Parties agree to develop and further strengthen the economic and cultural ties between the two countries in a spirit of friendship and co-operation, in accordance with the principles of equality and mutual benefit and of non-interference in each other's internal affairs.

Article IV. Any difference or dispute arising out of the interpretation or application of the present Treaty shall be settled by negotiation through normal diplomatic channel.

Article V. This present Treaty is subject to ratification and the instruments of ratification will be exchanged in Peking as soon as possible. The present Treaty will come into force immediately on the exchange of the instruments of ratification and will remain in force for a period of ten years. Unless either of the Contracting Parties gives to the other notice in writing to terminate the Treaty at least one year before the expiration of this period, it will remain in force without any specified time limit, subject to the right of either of the Contracting Parties to terminate it by giving to the other in writing a year's notice of its intention to do so.

Done in duplicate in Kathmandu on the twenty-eighth day of April 1960, in the Chinese, Nepali and English languages, all texts being equally authentic. Plenipotentiary of the People's Republic of China Plenipotentiary of the Kingdom of Nepal.

== Mustang incident June 1960 ==
Hopes of a successful treaty were feared to be short-founded following an "incident" in the demilitarised zone of the Kore Pass of the Mustang border region on 28 June 1960. Chinese troops shot at a group of unarmed Nepali border patrol officers, killing one of them and capturing between 15 and 17 others. The creation of the demilitarised zone had been accomplished specifically to diminish tensions at the border, with both sides agreeing to withdraw for 20 miles on either side after the March 1960 Border Treaty. Nevertheless, Chinese forces had overlooked this pledge, to pursue Tibetan rebels within the area, with the Chinese Foreign Ministry explaining that the Nepalese police had been mistaken for these combatants. Eventually, China apologised, paid a 50,000 rupee indemnity and released the Nepali police, but they disagreed with Nepal as to where the event had occurred, that it happened on Nepali territory and that they needed consent from Nepal to operate in the demilitarised zone. The later Sino-Nepali Joint Frontier Border Commission found that both the place where Nepal said the event had happened and the alternative Chinese spot were on Nepal's side of the border. Although this and resentment over the unilateral 1960 Chinese Mount Everest expedition prompted a wide array of cross-party opposition to China's actions (apart from the Nepali Communist Party), eventually Koirala agreed to enter into further discussions on the border question.

== Sino-Nepal border treaty 1961 ==
On 5 October 1961, another border treaty between China and Nepal was signed by Liu Shao-chi and Mahendra that superseded the one from 21 March 1960. Although the text of this treaty only specifically mentions the 21 March 1960 treaty rather than the Treaty of Peace and Friendship, it attributes the "over-all settlement of the boundary question" to "friendly consultations" such as the 28 April 1960 treaty. The cumulative effect of these treaties has been argued by Elleman and others to have detrimentally affected Nepal and China's relationship with India, with many changes from the 1961 treaty particularly objectionable and vigorously opposed.

== Significance during Sino-Indian War of 1962 ==
Although Article I and Article II of the treaty only applied to direct relations between Nepal and China, it is unclear in exactly what ways they might have applied to Nepal during the Sino-Indian War, with Nepal overtly remaining neutral throughout the war and deliberately offered little or no help to either side, while covertly Nepalese government acquiesced to Indian PM Nehru's request to station some Indian troops in "Nepal's northern part" including Nepal's Kalapani area, which was a reflection of Nepal's 1950 Treaty with India. Further assistance towards India was adversely affected by the imprisonment of (supposedly pro-Indian) Koirala in December 1960 by King Mahendra, confirmed in 1961 by the announcement of a project to build 104 km road from Kathmandu to Kodari, with Indian PM Nehru stating that "India's national security would be adversely affected by the road".

== Significance in the modern era ==
Sanju believes that the Treaty represented Nepal's importance as a buffer state between India and China and was the first affirmation of China's military strategy for Nepal, in that it was seen as a fundamental part of "China's inner security ring" and "cannot be spared to any regional or global power". Recently, Nepalese journalists and military personnel have stressed the significance of the Treaty in proving a history of successful co-operation between the two nations. Both Chinese and Indian sources have stressed the importance of this agreement in allowing for later co-operation, such as Nepal supporting the PRC's membership of the UN in 1971 and Nepal's agreement to join the Belt and Road Initiative in 2017.

== Works cited ==
- Adhikari, Monalisa, Between the Dragon and the Elephant: Nepal's Neutrality Conundrum, Indian Journal of Asian Affairs, New Delhi, 2012, Vol. 25, Issue 1/2
- Bhasin, Avtra Singh, Nepal's Relations with India and China, Siba Exim Pvt. Ltd, Delhi, 1994,
- Bhattarai, Niranjan, Nepal and China- A Historical Perspective, Adroit Publishers, New Delhi, 2010,
- Dabhade, M., Coping with challenges to sovereignty: Sino-Indian rivalry and Nepal's foreign policy, Contemporary South Asia, New Delhi, 2004, Vol. 13, Issue 2
- Elleman, Bruce, Kotkin, Stephen, Schofield, Clive, Beijing's Power and China's Borders: Twenty Neighbors in Asia, M.E. Sharpe, New York, 2013
- Fravel, M. Taylor, Strong Borders, Secure Nation: Cooperation and Conflict in China's Territorial Disputes, Princeton University Press, Princeton, 2008
- Ghimire, Safal, The Politics of Peacebuilding: Emerging Actors and Security Sector Reform in Conflict-Affected States, Routledge, New Delhi, 2019
- Gurung, Sanju, How has Nepal maintained neutrality, and why? School of Politics and International Relations- University of Kent, Canterbury, 2014
- Hyer, Eric, The Pragmatic Dragon: China's Grand Strategy and Boundary Settlements, UBC Press, Vancouver, 2015
- Panikar, Kavalam Madhava, In Two Chinas: Memoirs of a Diplomat, Hyperion Press, Connecticut, 1955
- Rose, Leo E., Nepal; Strategy for Survival, University of California Press, Berkeley, 1971
- Rowland, John, A History of Sino-Indian Relations, Allied Publishers Pvt. Ltd, New Delhi, 1987
- Singh, R. S. N., The Unmaking of Nepal, Centre for Land Warfare Studies, New Delhi, 2010
- Tuladhar, Daman R., Contemporary Nepal (1945–55), Laxmi Publication, Kathmandu, 1965
- Van Tronder, Gerry, Sino-Indian War: Border Clash: October–November 1962, Pen and Sword Military, Barnsley, 2018
