= Dinggyê Township =

Dinggyê གདིང་སྐྱེས་ · 定结乡
- Township
- Location within Tibet Autonomous Region
- Coordinates: 28°18′35″N 88°05′40″E
- Country: People's Republic of China
- Autonomous region: Tibet
- Prefecture-level city: Shigatse
- County: Dinggyê

Population (2010)
  - Total: 1,113
- Time zone: UTC+8 (China Standard)

Dinggyê (Tibetan: གདིང་སྐྱེས་; simplified Chinese: 定结乡; traditional Chinese: 定結鄉; pinyin: Dìngjié Xiāng) is a village and township in Dinggyê County, in the Shigatse prefecture-level city of the Tibet Autonomous Region of China. At the time of the 2010 census, the town had a population of 1,586. As of 2019, it had six villages under its administration.
