= Gyangkar =

- Town
- Location within Tibet Autonomous Region
- Coordinates: 28°22′03″N 87°46′08″E
- Country: China
- Region: Tibet
- Prefecture: Shigatse
- County: Dinggyê

Population (2010)
  - Total: 4,428
  - Major Nationalities: Tibetan
  - Regional dialect: Tibetan language
- Time zone: UTC+8 (China Standard)

Gyangkar or Jiangga (Chinese: 江嘎镇) is a town in Dinggyê County, in the Shigatse prefecture-level city of the Tibet Autonomous Region of China. At the time of the 2010 census, the town had a population of 4,428.As of 2013, it had 6 communities under its administration.
