= Ri'og =

- Town
- Location within Tibet Autonomous Region
- Coordinates: 28°0′43″N 87°40′54″E
- Country: China
- Autonomous Region: Tibet
- Prefecture: Shigatse
- County: Dinggyê

Population (2010)
  - Total: 1,113
- Time zone: UTC+8 (China Standard)

Ri'og (Chinese: 日屋镇) is a town in Dinggyê County, in the Shigatse prefecture-level city of the Tibet Autonomous Region of China. At the time of the 2010 census, the town had a population of 1,113.As of 2013, it had 5 communities under its administration.

Ri'og has been a traditional trade market between Tibet and Nepal. However, due to lack of cross-border vehicle-accessible route, the trade has been limited in scale.
