= Dinggyê County =

Dinggyê County གཏིང་སྐྱེས་རྫོང་། · 定结县 Dinjie, Tingche, Tingkye
- County
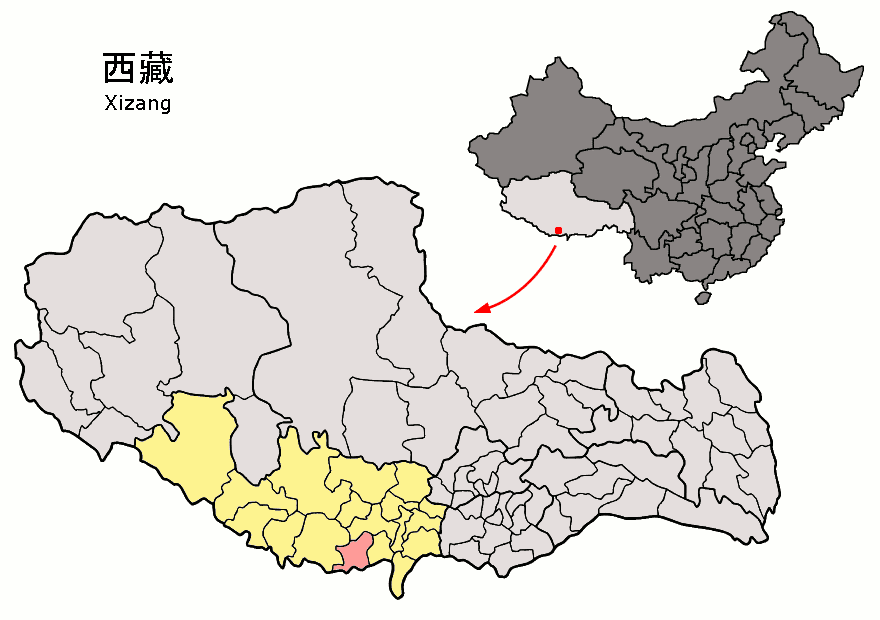
- Location of Dinggyê County (red) within Shigatse City (yellow) and the Tibet Autonomous Region

- Location of the seat in the Tibet A.R. Dinggyê (China)
- Coordinates (Dinggyê County government): 28°21′51″N 87°45′57″E
- Country: China
- Autonomous region: Tibet
- Prefecture-level city: Shigatse
- County seat: Gyankar

Area
  - Total: 5,834.55 km^{2} (2,252.73 sq mi)

Population (2020)
  - Total: 20,362
  - Density: 3.4899/km^{2} (9.0388/sq mi)
- Time zone: UTC+8 (China Standard)
- Website: www.djx.gov.cn

Dinggyê County

Chinese name
- Simplified Chinese: 定结县
- Traditional Chinese: 定結縣
Transcriptions
Standard Mandarin
- Hanyu Pinyin: Dìngjié Xiàn
Yue: Cantonese
- Jyutping: ding^{6}git^{3} jyun^{2}

Tibetan name
- Tibetan: གཏིང་སྐྱེས་རྫོང་།
Transcriptions
- Wylie: gding skyes rdzong
- Tibetan Pinyin: Dinggyê Zong

Dinggyê County (Tibetan: གཏིང་སྐྱེས་རྫོང་།, Chinese: 定结县) is a county of the Shigatse city in the Tibet Autonomous Region, China, bordering Nepal's Sankhuwasabha and Taplejung Districts to the south and India's Sikkim state to the southeast. Jin Co and Duolo Co are located in this county.

It is one of the four counties that comprise the Qomolangma National Nature Preserve (Dinggyê, Tingri, Nyalam, and Kyirong).

== Administration divisions ==
Dinggyê County is divided into 3 towns and 7 townships.

Name	Chinese	Hanyu Pinyin	Tibetan	Wylie
Towns
Gyangkar Town	江嘎镇	Jiānggā zhèn	རྒྱལ་མཁར་གྲོང་རྡལ།	rgyal mkhar grong rdal
Zhêntang Town	陈塘镇	Chéntáng zhèn	འདྲེན་ཐང་གྲོང་རྡལ།	'dren thang grong rdal
Ri'og Town	日屋镇	Rìwū zhèn	རི་འོག་གྲོང་རྡལ།	ri 'og grong rdal
Townships
Qab Township	确布乡	Quèbù xiāng	ཆབ་ཤང་།	chab shang
Dinggyê Township	定结乡	Dìngjié xiāng	གདིང་སྐྱེས་ཤང་།	gding skyes shang
Dozhag Township	多布扎乡	Duōbùzhā xiāng	རྡོ་བྲག་ཤང་།	rdo brag shang
Tashi Nang Township	扎西岗乡	Zhāxīgǎng xiāng	བཀྲ་ཤིས་སྣང་ཤང་།	bkra shis snang shang
Kyungzê Township	琼孜乡	Qióngzī xiāng	ཁྱུང་རྩེ་ཤང་།	khyung rtse shang
Sar Township	萨尔乡	Sà'ěr xiāng	གཟར་ཤང་།	gzar shang
Gojag Township	郭加乡	Guōjiā xiāng	ཀོ་ལྕག་ཤང་།	ko lcag shang
