= Korala =

Pass between Tibet and Nepal

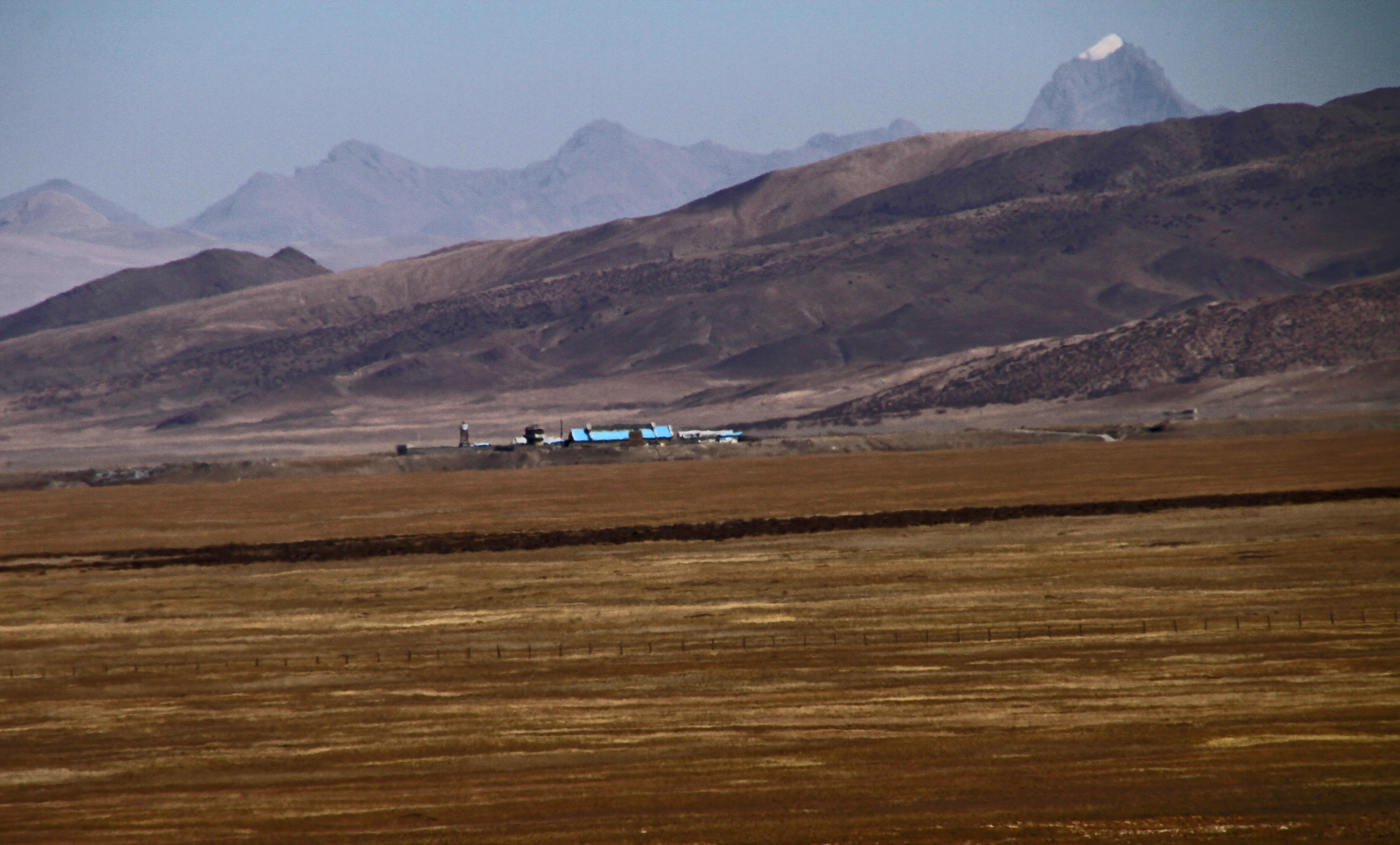
- View of PLA Kunmuja border outpost from Nepal

- Location within Gandaki Province Location within Ngari Location within Tibet Location within Nepal
- Elevation: 4,660 m (15,290 ft)

Location
- Location: China–Nepal border
- Range: Himalayas
- Coordinates: 29°18′14″N 83°58′7″E

Korala or Kora La or Koro La (Nepali: कोरला; literally Kora Pass) is a mountain pass between Tibet and Gandaki Province. At only 4,660 metres (15,290 ft) in elevation, it has been considered the lowest drivable path between Tibetan Plateau and the Indian subcontinent. It currently serves as a vehicle border crossing between China and Nepal. The Lektse Port at Korala is the fourth land port between China and Nepal that Beijing has opened, after the Tatopani-Khasa (Zham), Rasuwa-Kerung (Gyirong), and Yari (Humla)-Purang (Burang) ports.

== Geography ==
Korala is situated on the drainage divide between the Yarlung Tsangpo and Ganges river basins. At 4,660 m (15,290 ft), it is the lowest pass across the Himalayan mountain range. As such, it forms the key col for K2 on the ridgeline connecting it to Mount Everest. The Kali Gandaki River has its source near the southern side of the pass.

== History ==
Korala is one of the oldest routes between the two regions. It was historically used for salt trade between Tibet and Nepalese kingdoms. Up until 2008 when the Nepali monarchy was abolished, Upper Mustang was the Kingdom of Lo, an ethnic Tibetan kingdom that was a suzerainty of Kingdom of Nepal. The suzerainty allowed for a certain level of independence in local governance from the Nepalese central government.

During the late 1950s and 60s, the Tibetan guerrilla group Chushi Gangdruk operated out of Upper Mustang with the intention of raiding PLA positions in Tibet. This led to a border incident that caused the killing of a Nepalese officer who was mistaken by Chinese border guards as a Tibetan rebel.

The People's Republic of China and the Kingdom of Nepal officially signed a border agreement in 1961. The border was set slightly north of the traditional boundary marker. The traditional location of Korala is marked by a stupa that lies a bit south of the demarcated border between China and Nepal at 29°18′14″N 83°58′7″E.

In late December 1999, the 17th claimant Karmapa Ogyen Trinley Dorje fled Tibet through this area. In response, China built a border fence immediately after. There is a PLA border outpost named "Kunmuja" a few miles on Chinese side, it is the westernmost border outpost in Tibet Military District. The outpost was renovated in 2009 to have a modern facility.

The border was closed in the 1960s. However, a semiannual cross-border trade fair remained, during which the border was open to local traders, until the COVID-19 pandemic. In 2012, Nepal and China agreed to open 6 more official border crossings, Korala being one of them. In July 2016, the Nepalese government announced that this border crossing was expected to open, and also expected it to be the third most important crossing between the two countries. By 2022, the border infrastructure on the Chinese side had been completed, while the Nepali authorities were in the process of upgrading the road network.

The border crossing opened in 2023. Port facilities were built at Lektse on the Chinese side and Nechung on the Nepali side. Daily consumer goods, construction materials, electronic materials and clothes are imported to Mustang, while pashmina, agricultural products and yarsagumba are exported to China.
