= Chaudhara =

Himalayan mountain peak in Kumaon, India

- Location within Uttarakhand Location within Tibet Location within India

Highest point
- Elevation: 6,510 m (21,360 ft)
- Listing: List of mountains in India
- Coordinates: 30°16′48″N 80°22′12″E

Geography
- Location: Pithoragarh, Uttarakhand, India
- Parent range: Kumaon Himalaya

Climbing
- First ascent: A.R.Chandekar and Sherpa Ajeeba in 1973
- Easiest route: West Face

Chaudhara is a Himalayan mountain peak, situated in the Pithoragarh district of Kumaon, India. The altitude of the peak is 6,510 m. The peak lies to the south of Ralam pass and north west of Panchchuli. The peak is so named due to the peak having four corners. The peak was climbed for the first time by an Indian team led by A.R.Chandekar and Sherpa Ajeeba in 1973. Rajrambha is its neighbouring peak. Chaudhara is situated at the south east end of Kalabaland Glacier-Sankalp Glacier-Yangchar Glacier group. Chaudhara is the part of Himalayan massif between Ralam and Lassar valley. The most popular route to the summit is via the west face.

== First Ascent Route ==
Ralam River ― BC Shiva Glacier (13800 ft) ― Camp II (15100 ft) ― Camp III (17700 ft) ― Summit
