= Chiring We =

Mountain peak in Uttarakhand, India

- Location within Uttarakhand

Highest point
- Elevation: 6,559 m (21,519 ft)
- Prominence: 1,196 m (3,924 ft)
- Coordinates: 30°25′12″N 80°18′00″E

Geography
- Location: Pithoragarh, Uttarakhand, India
- Parent range: Kumaon Himalaya

Geology
- Rock age: 7,820

Climbing
- First ascent: 1979 by Harish Kapadia
- Easiest route: Sankalpa glacier (India)

Chiring We is a Himalayan peak situated in eastern Kumaun of the Pithoragarh district of Uttarakhand state in India. The altitude of the peak is 6,559 m. Chiring We is the highest peak above the Kalabaland Glacier. Chiring We massif, which include peaks like Bamba Dhura (6,334 m), Suli Top (6,300 m), Trigal (5,983 m), Suitilla (6,373 m), separates Lassar Yankti valley from Kalabaland valley. The peak literally means 'Mountain of long life'. The route is through glaciers of Kalabaland, Sankalpa and Yankchar, icefall, crevasses, ice-pinnacles, ice walls and sharp ridges. First ascent of this peak was made in 1979 by an Indian team led by Harish Kapadia via northeast ridge.

== Climbing history ==
On 10 June 1979 'The Mountaineers', a club from Bombay climbed Chiring We, led by Harish Kapadia. The summiters were Zerksis S. Boga, Lakhpa Tsering, Nayankumar Katira and Kami Tsering. The route taken from Camp 3 to the col between Chiring We and Bamba Dhura. Then on north face to the west ridge, followed to the top. For the final assault about 1500 ft of rope was fixed. This was the last highest unclimbed peak in Kumaon. The team comprised Zerksis Boga (Deputy Leader) and Nayankumar Katira as team leader with Vijay Kothari, Chandrasinh Danthi, Kanu PomaL, Dr Rodhan Shroff, Dr Vasant Desai, Kali Bordiwala, Rajendra Desai and three sherpas Chewang Tashi, Kami Tsering and Lakhpa Tsering.

== Neighboring and subsidiary peaks ==
Neighboring or subsidiary peaks of Chiring We:

- Bamba Dhura, 6,334 m (20,781 ft), 30°26′24″N 80°16′48″E
- Suli Top, 6,300 m (20,700 ft), 30°25′09″N 80°19′29″E
- Kalganga Dhura, 6,215m (20,390 ft)30°27′15″N 80°15′33″E
- Kalabaland Dhura, 6,105m (20,030 ft)30°25′31″N 80°15′34″E
- Suitilla, 6,373m (20,909 ft)30°19′48″N 80°22′48″E

== Glaciers and rivers ==
Kalabaland Glacier is 15 km in length, running NW to SE. It joins the Yankchar glacier and both together form the Shankalpa glacier, The Ralam Gad river originates from here which later joins Gori Ganga or Gori gad which originates at Milam Glacier on the western side of Kalabaland glacier.

== See also ==
- List of mountain peaks of Uttarakhand
