= Saur Valley =

Small valley in Pithoragarh, Uttarakhand, India

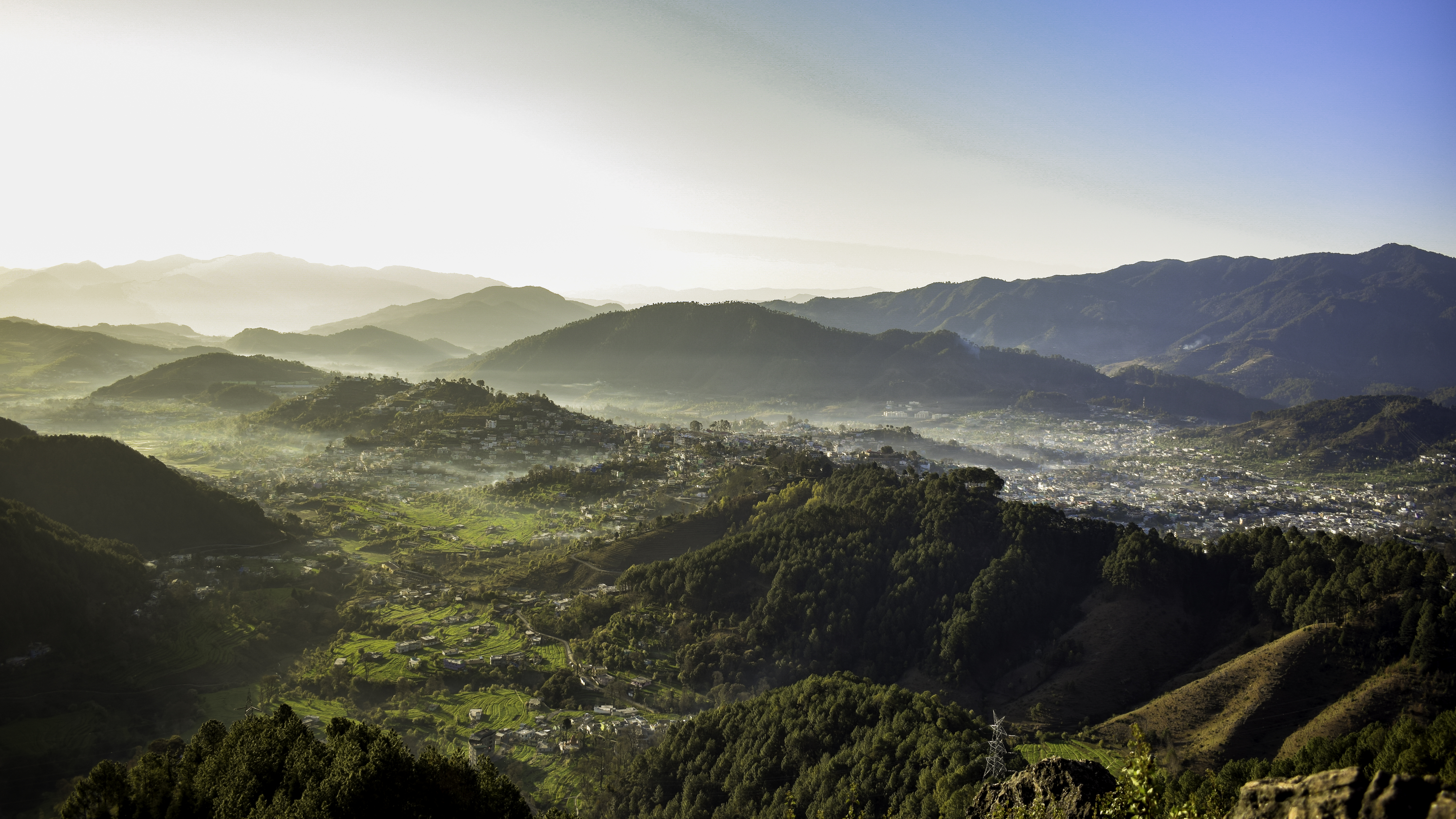
view of Saur Valley and Pithoragarh town

Soar Valley (also Soar; Hindi: सोर घाटी) is a small valley, 8 km (5.0 mi) long and 5 km (3.1 mi) wide, which resembles Kashmir Valley, located in Pithoragarh district of Uttarakhand state of India. Pithoragarh town (the headquarters of the district) is situated in this valley. The valley is surrounded by beautiful mountains, slopes gently to the south-east, and is bisected into north and south by a tubular ridge of slate, limestone and greenstone originating in the mountains to the north-west and branching down to the south-east. The altitude is 1,650 m (5,410 ft) above sea level. One can have panoramic views of the vast snow range extending across Trishuli, Nanda Devi, Panchchuli Group, and Api of Nepal from the place named Chandak, located on a nearby 2,000 m (6,600 ft) hill. Most Manu, near Chandak, hosts an annual fair.

== History ==
Soar was under Kumaon Kingdom, Saur was ruled by Katyuri Kings. Some remnants of their forts of Ajayemerukot, Unchakot, Bhatkot, Bailerkot, Udaypurkot, Dumrakot, Sahajkot, Bamuakot, Dewarkot, and Dunikot are still present, In 1449, the Chand kings displaced katyuri kings from saur, and Prithivi Gosaein built a fort named Pithora Garh, for which the area was later named.

== See also ==
- Darma Valley
- Johar Valley
- Pithoragarh district
