= Rajrambha =

Highest point
- Elevation: 6,537 m (21,447 ft)
- Coordinates: 30°15′00″N 80°22′12″E

Geography
- Location: Pithoragarh, Uttarakhand, India
- Parent range: Kumaon Himalaya

Rajrambha is the name of a Himalayan mountain peak, situated in the Pithoragarh district of Uttarakhand state of India. It means 'celestial nymph' (Apsara) in Hindi. This peak is situated south of the Kalabaland Glacier in eastern Kumaun in the Ralam valley. The summit of the peak is 6,537 m. The nearby peaks which form the north–south massif are Suitilla 6,373 m, Chaudhara 6,510 m, and Ngalaphu 6,410 m.

Rajrambha forms a wall between Lasser Yankti and Ralam Valley. It can be approached through the Uttari Balati glacier passing the Balati plateau. Dhakar or Tidang is the base camp from where one can climb the Rajrambha peak (6537m). Dhakar is near Tawaghat in Pithoragarh district as the last motorable station on the way.

On the mountain peak, several alpine flowers can be found including, Iris kumaonenis, Primula macrophylla and lillium oxypetalum.
