= Burphu Dhura =

Mountain in Uttarakhand, India

- Location within India

Highest point
- Elevation: 6,334 m (20,781 ft)
- Coordinates: 30°23′04″N 80°15′36″E

Geography
- Location: Pithoragarh, Uttarakhand, India
- Parent range: Kumaon Himalaya

Climbing
- First ascent: 2000

Burphu Dhura is a Himalayan mountain peak situated in the Pithoragarh district of Uttarakhand, India. The altitude of the summit is 6,334 m. It is situated at the end ridge over the Kalabaland Glacier in the eastern part of the district, left to the Milam Glacier. Kalabaland Dhura (6,105 m) is situated to the west of this peak on the same massif. Burphu Dhura massif is the part of divide between Kalabaland and Goriganga valleys. This peak was first of all climbed to summit in 2000 from south on 27 September 2000 by Loveraj Dharmashaktu, Balwant Singh Kapkoti and Ramesh by an Indian team led by Wing Cdr S S Puri. The peak has two approaches—one from the Kalabaland glacier above the icefall and another from Burphu village in the Milam valley.
