= Kandali Festival =

Traditional festival in Uttarakhand, India

Kandali Festival is a festival held by the Rung tribe of the Pithoragarh district of Uttarakhand state in India. This festival coincides with the blooming of the Kandali plant, which flowers once every twelve years. It is held in the Chaundas Valley between August and October. It celebrates the defeat of Zorawar Singh's army, which attacked this area from Ladakh in 1841.

Kandali is a week-long festival where the people of the valley worship an idol of Lord Shiva made from barley and millet and pray for victory over their enemies. After the puja, a ceremonial feast is held, followed by the hoisting of their flag. Victorious chants are raised, and reenactments of resistance battles take place. In a symbolic act, the locals attack the Kandali shrubs, representing their triumph. The celebrations and festivities continue throughout the night.

== Regional traditions and observance ==
The Kandali Festival is associated with the Rung community of the Chaundas Valley in Pithoragarh district, Uttarakhand, India. It is linked to the flowering of the Kandali plant, identified as Strobilanthes wallichii, which is traditionally said to bloom at intervals of about twelve years. Celebrations include community gatherings and the ceremonial uprooting of the flowering plants. The festival is also associated with local oral traditions concerning the community's resistance to invading forces.
