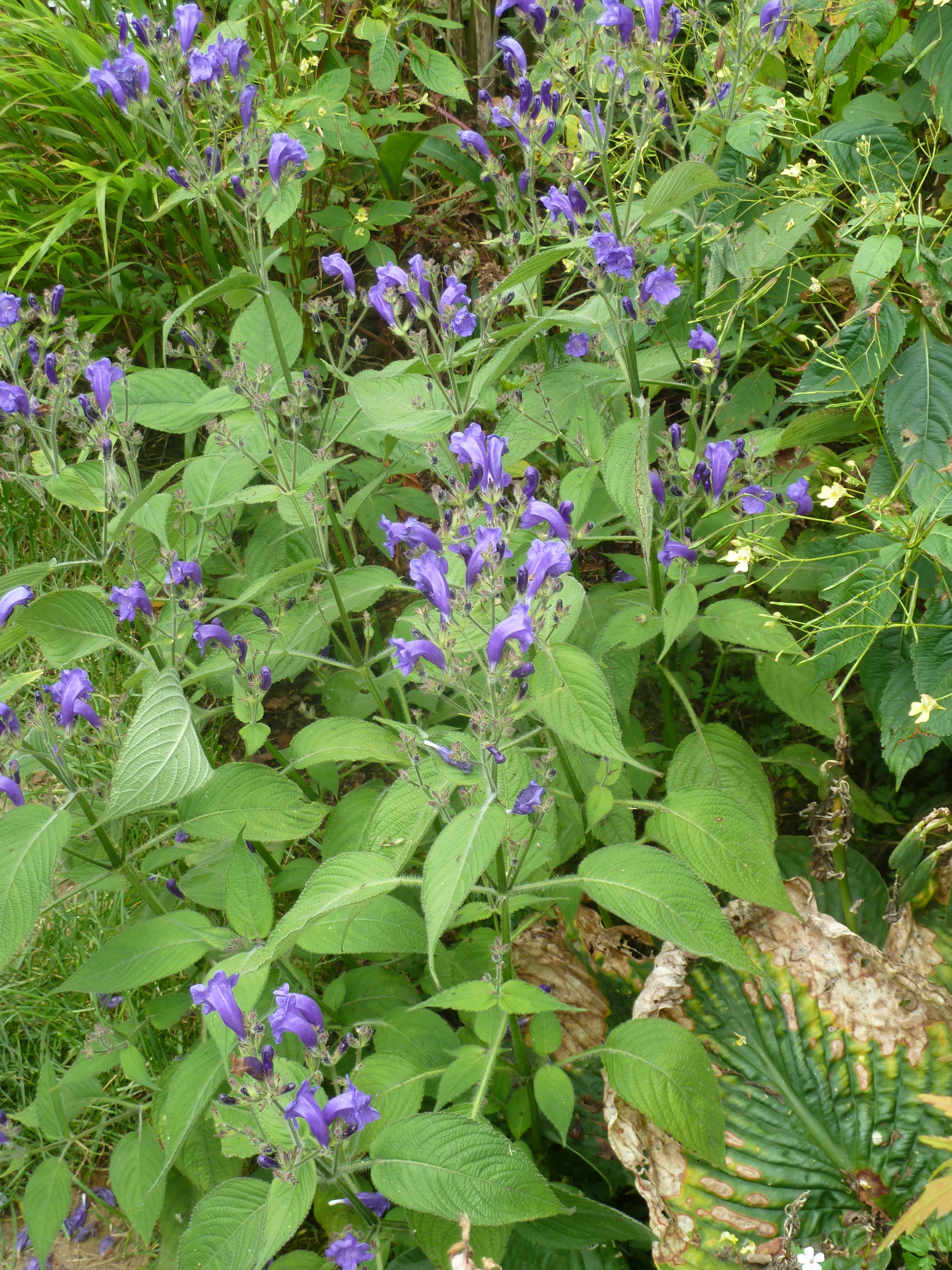

Scientific classification
- Kingdom: Plantae
- Clade: Tracheophytes
- Clade: Angiosperms
- Clade: Eudicots
- Clade: Asterids
- Order: Lamiales
- Family: Acanthaceae
- Genus: Strobilanthes
- Species: S. wallichii

Binomial name
- Strobilanthes wallichii Nees

= Strobilanthes wallichii =

Species of flowering plant

Strobilanthes wallichii, commonly known as Kashmir acanthus, hardy Persian shield, wild petunia, or kandali, is a herbaceous perennial which is native to the Himalayas. In its natural habitat, it purple blooms appear only once every twelve years, an occasion which is celebrated by the Kandali Festival in the Pithoragarh District in India.

Synonyms include:

- Pteracanthus alatus (Wall. ex Nees) Bremek.
- Ruellia alata Wall. ex Nees
- Strobilanthes atropurpureus Nees
