= Kalabaland Dhura =

Mountain in Uttarakhand, India

- Location within Uttarakhand

Highest point
- Elevation: 6,105 m (20,030 ft)
- Prominence: 270 m (890 ft)
- Coordinates: 30°25′31″N 80°15′34″E

Geography
- Location: Uttarakhand, India
- Parent range: Garhwal Himalaya

Climbing
- First ascent: on 6 June, 1979 by Harish Kapadia, Vijay Kothari and Lakhpa Tsering.

Kalabaland Dhura is a mountain of the Garhwal Himalaya in Uttarakhand India. It situated at the head of Kalabaland Glacier. The elevation of Kalabaland Dhura is 6,105 metres (20,030 ft) and its prominence is 270 metres (886 ft). It is 158th highest located entirely within the Uttrakhand. Nanda Devi, is the highest mountain in this category. It lies 3 km south of Kalganga Dhura 6,215 metres (20,390 ft). Its nearest higher neighbor Bamba Dhura 6,334 metres (20,781 ft) lies 2.7 km ENE and it is 3.7 km west of Chiring We 6,559 metres (21,519 ft). It lies 6.9 km NW of Suli Top 6,300 metres (20,669 ft).

== Climbing history ==
The first ascent of Kalabaland Dhura happened on 6 June, 1979 by Harish Kapadia, Vijay Kothari and Lakhpa Tsering. They taken the route from Camp 3 to a col on the north side of the peak. Then followed a steep gully to the top which had heavy cornices on the top. Kalabaland Dhura is a suggested name for this unnamed peak at that time.

A team from I.I.T Bombay led by V. V. Limaye climbed Kalabaland Dhura in 1982.

== Neighboring and subsidiary peaks ==
Neighboring peaks of Kalabaland Dhura:

- Bamba Dhura, 6,334m (20,781 ft), 30°26′24″N 80°16′48″E
- Suli Top, 6,300m (20,669 ft), 30°25′09″N 80°19′29″E
- Kalganga Dhura, 6,215m (20,390 ft)30°27′15″N 80°15′33″E
- Chiring We, 6,559m (20,030 ft)30°25′12″N 80°18′00″E
- Suitilla, 6,373m (20,909 ft)30°19′48″N 80°22′48″E

== Glaciers and rivers ==
Kalabaland Glacier is 15 km in length, running NW to SE. It joins the Yankchar glacier and both together form the Shankalpa glacier, The Ralam Gad river originates from here which later joins Gori Ganga or Gori gad which originates at Milam Glacier on the west of Kalabaland glacier.

== See also ==
- List of Himalayan peaks of Uttarakhand
