= Pithoragarh district =

- District of Uttarakhand
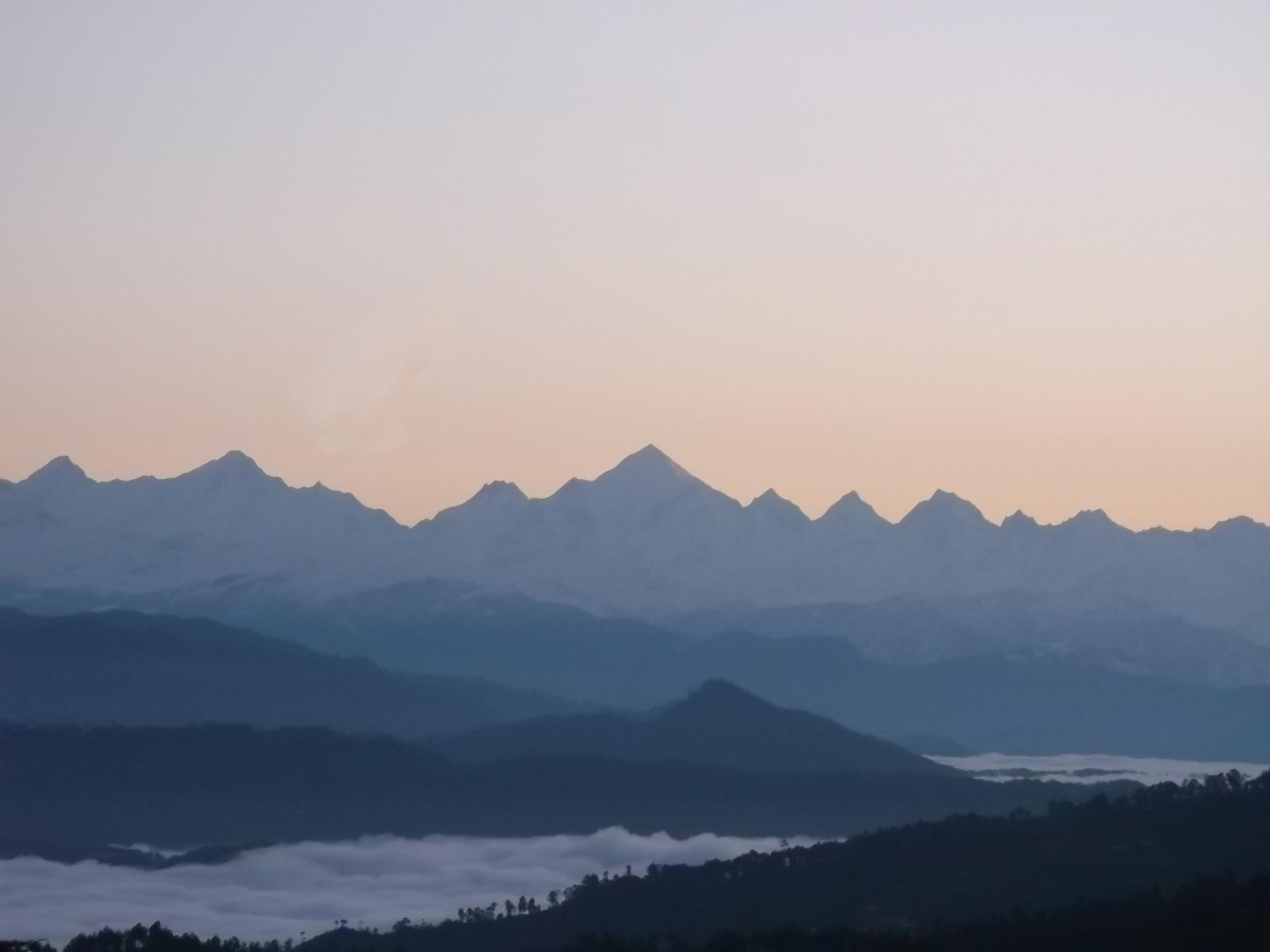
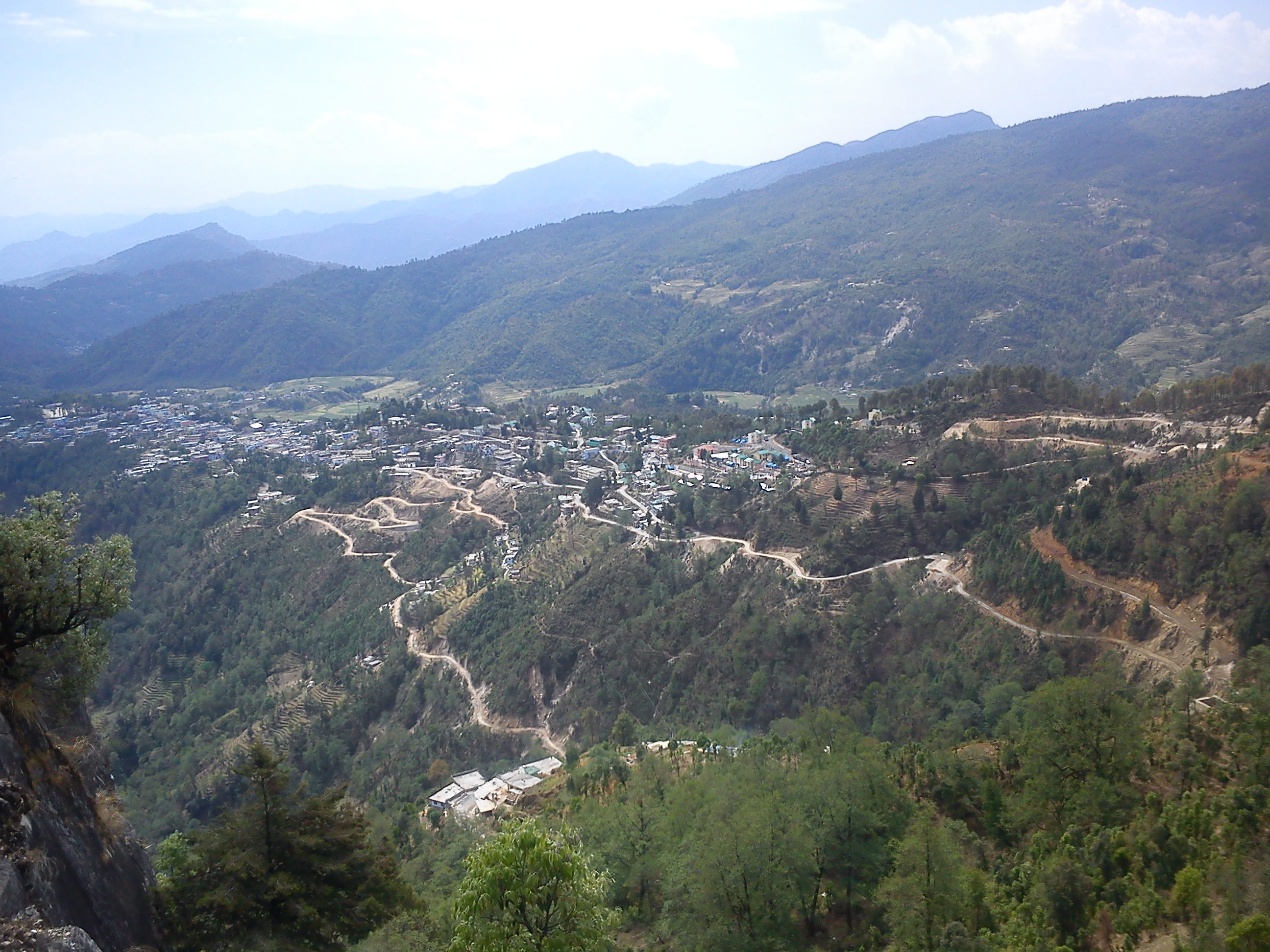
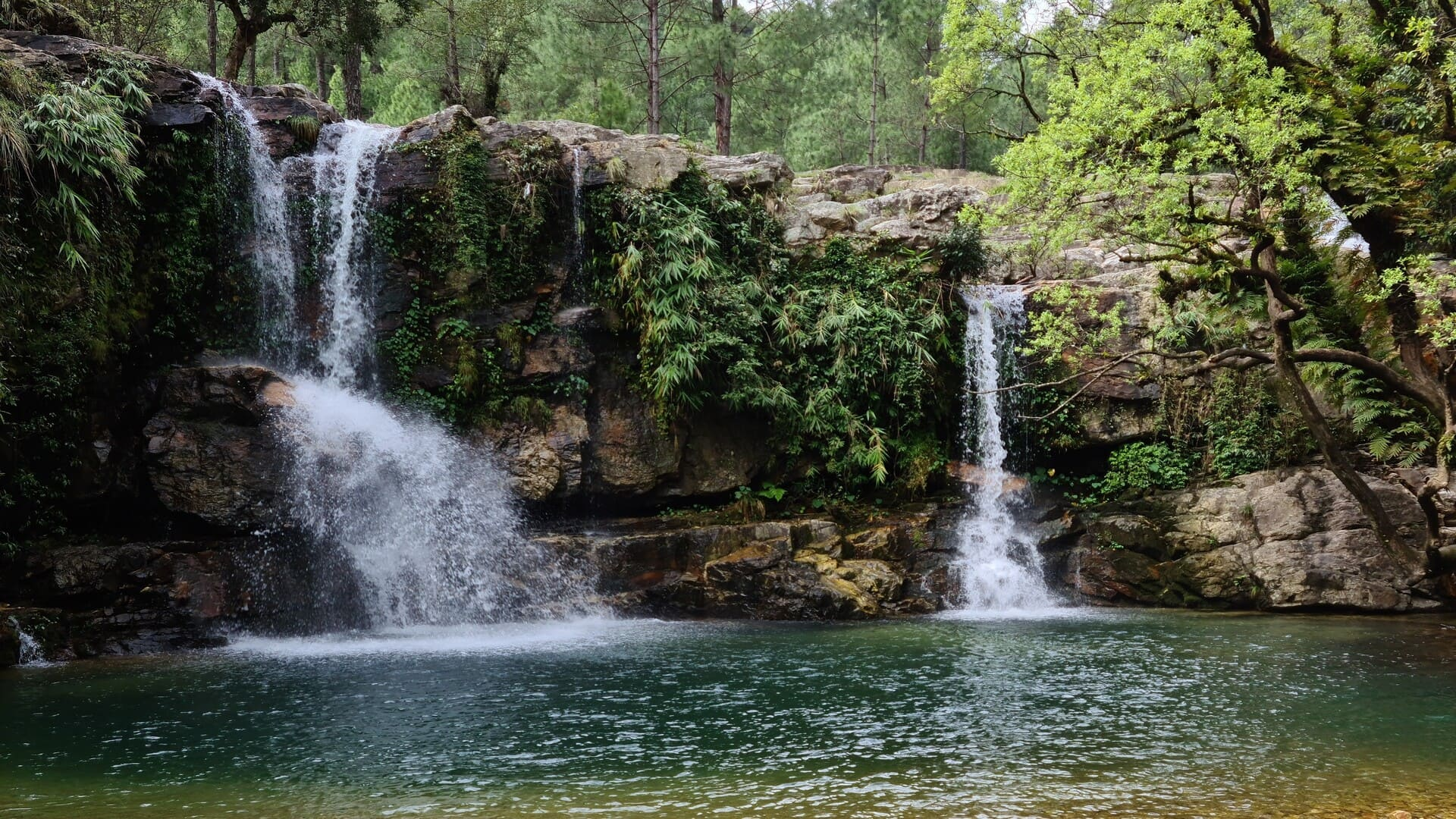
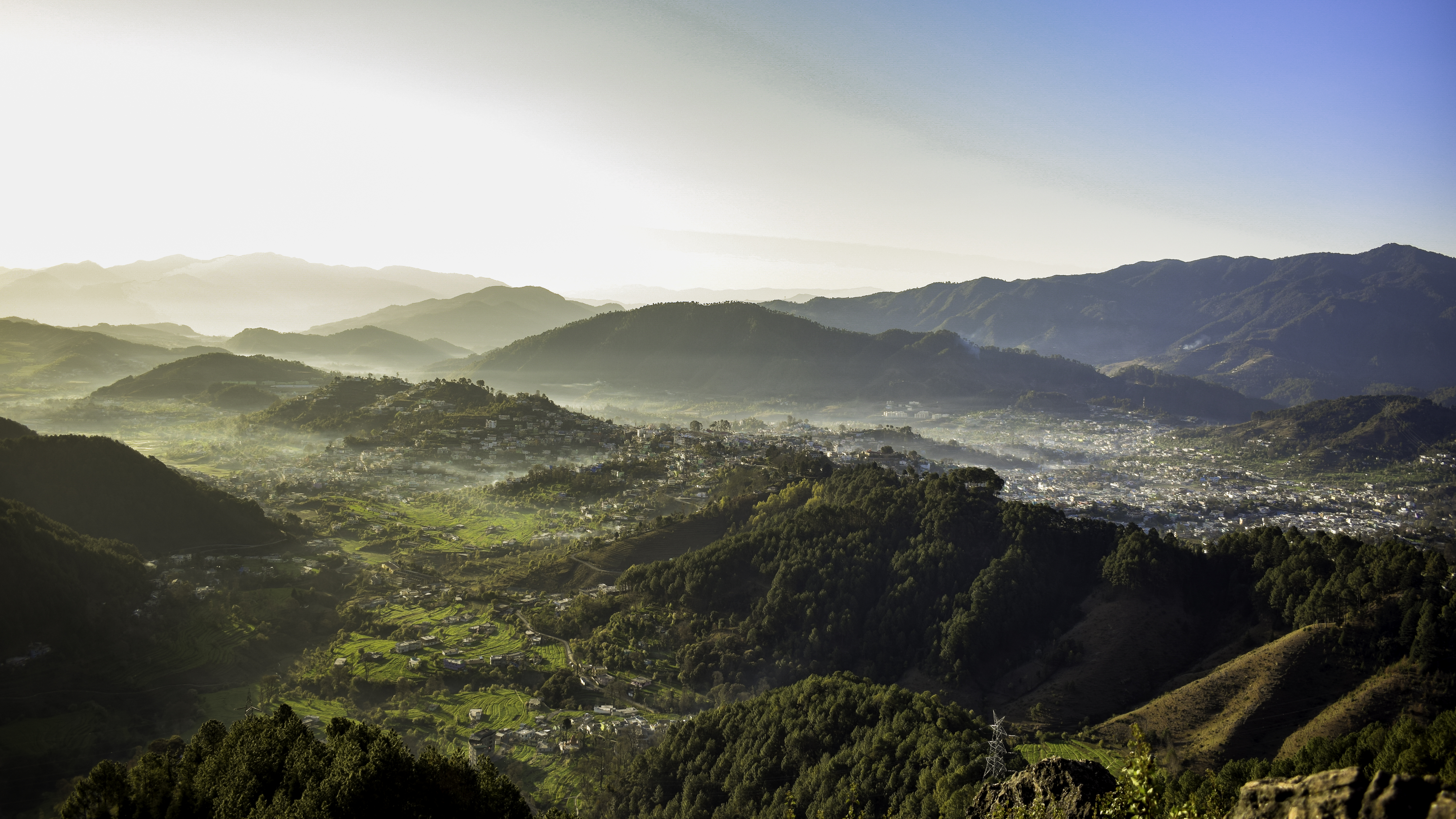
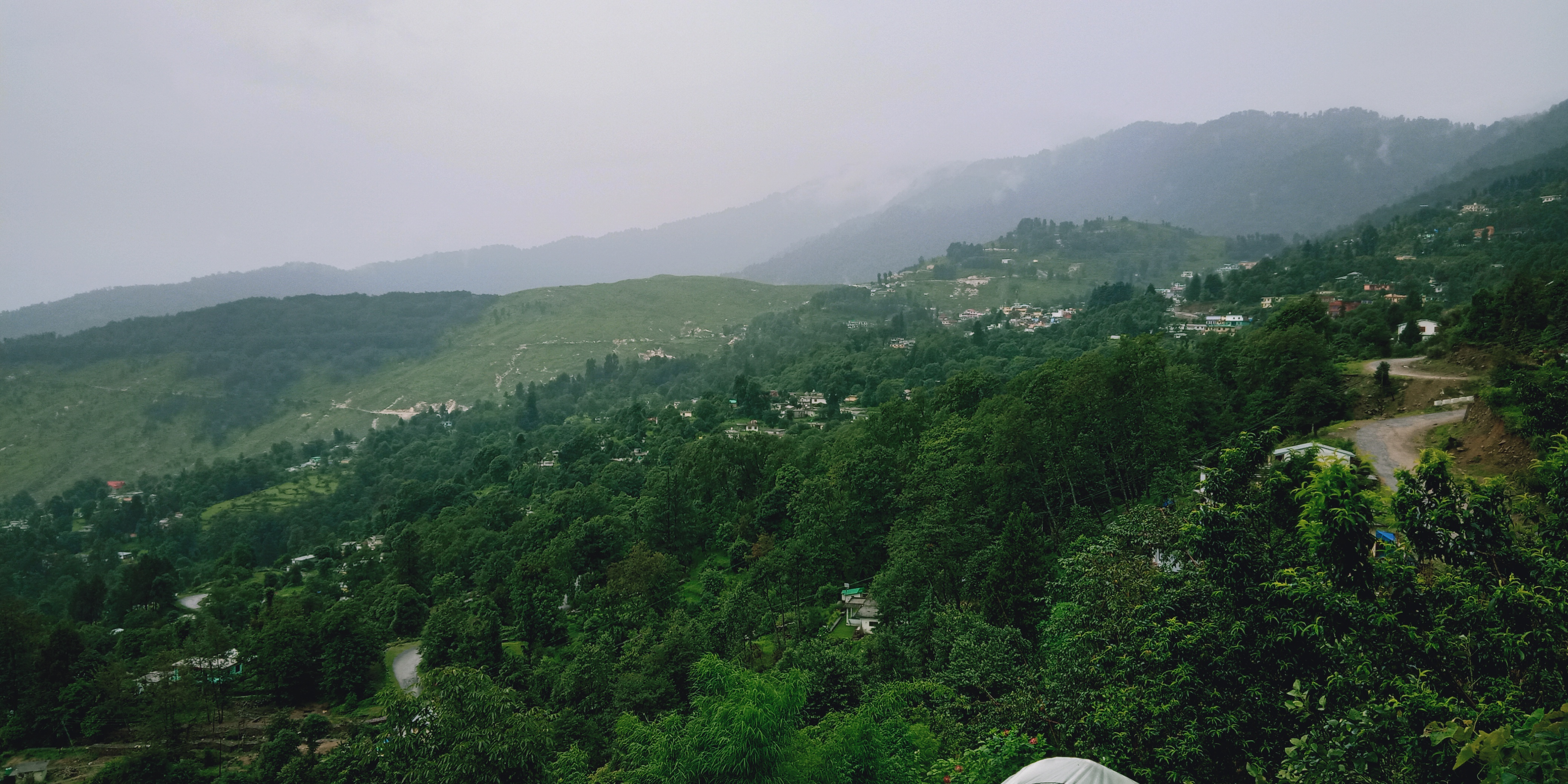
- Panchchuli peaks at Sunset from Chaukori, View of Didihat, Saur Valley and Pithoragarh city, view of Munsiyari, Tunkhola waterfall at Berinag
- Nickname: Mini Kashmir
- Location in Uttarakhand
- Pithoragarh district
- Coordinates: 30°00′N 80°20′E
- Country: India
- State: Uttarakhand
- Division: Kumaon
- Headquarters: Pithoragarh

Government
  - District collector: Ashish Kumar Bhatgain, IAS

Area
  - Total: 7,110 km^{2} (2,750 sq mi)

Population (2011)
  - Total: 483,439
  - Density: 69/km^{2} (180/sq mi)

Languages
  - official: Hindi
  - Native: Kumaoni
  - Literacy: 82.25% (2011)
- Time zone: UTC+5:30 (IST)
- PIN: 262501
- Telephone code: 91 5964
- Vehicle registration: UK-05
- Website: pithoragarh.nic.in

Pithoragarh district is the easternmost district in the state of Uttarakhand. It is located in the Himalayas and has an area of 7,110 km^{2} (2,750 sq mi) and a population of 483,439 (as of 2011). The city of Pithoragarh, located in Saur Valley, is its headquarters. The district is within the Kumaon division of Uttarakhand state. The Tibet plateau is situated to the north and Nepal is to the east. The Kali River which originates from the Kalagiri Mountain flows south, forming the eastern border with Nepal. The Hindu pilgrimage route for Mount Kailash-Lake Manasarovar passes through this district via Lipulekh Pass in the greater Himalayas.

The district is administratively divided into six Tehsils: Munsyari; Dharchula; Didihat; Berinag; Gangolihat; and Pithoragarh. Naini Saini Airport is the nearest civil airport, but it does not have a regular scheduled commercial passenger service. The mineral deposits present in the district are magnesium ore, copper ore, limestone, and slate. There are 11 tehsils. The overall sex ratio in Pithoragarh district is 1,020 females for every 1,000 males, which is notably higher than the national average.

== Etymology ==
Some attribute the name to King Prithvi Pal (Had his empire to Nainital & parts of UP) / Piru Gusain (Gusain refers to the younger son of a King), here the younger son of King of Askote (Pal)/ Pithora Shahi/ Pithora Chand from the Chand Dynasty, who built a fort named Pithora Garh in the Saur Valley.

== History ==
=== Pals (Branch of Katyuri kings) ===
After its conquest by Bhartpal, the Rajwar of Uku (now in Nepal), in the year 1364, Pithoragarh was ruled for the rest of the 14th century by three generations of Pals, and the kingdom extended from Pithoragarh to Askot.

=== Bam Dynasty ===
A village of Pithoragarh district

According to a Tamra Patra (inscribed copper or brass plaque) from 1420, the Pal dynasty, based out of Askot, was uprooted by Chand kings. Vijay Brahm (of the Brahm dynasty from Doti) took over the empire as King. Following the death of Gyan Chand, in a conflict with Kshetra Pal, the Pals were able to regain the throne.

=== Chand Dynasty ===
It is believed that Bharti Chand, an ancestor of Gyan Chand, had replaced Bams, the ruler of Pithoragarh, after defeating them in 1445. In the 16th century, the Chand dynasty again took control over Pithoragarh town and, in 1790, built a new fort on the hill where the present Girls Inter College is situated. The Chand rule, at its zenith, is seen as one of the most prominent empires in Kumaon. Their rule also coincides with a period of cultural resurgence. Archaeological surveys point toward the development of culture and art forms in this period.

=== Northern frontier: the Bhotiya Mehals ===
The northernmost tracts of Kumaon, bordering Tibet and Nepal, were known as the Bhotiya Mehals (also parganah Darma and parganah Johar). These high-altitude valleys — Johar, Darma, Chaudans and Byans — were inhabited by the Bhotiya communities, who practised transhumance and subsisted primarily on trans-Himalayan trade with Tibet through high passes such as the Lipu Lekh, Limpiya Dhura and the Unta Dhura.

Before the Gorkha conquest in 1791, the entire Byans region — including the villages of Chhangru and Tinkar east of the Kali River — was considered an integral part of Kumaon, distinct from the kingdoms of Doti and Jumla. After the Treaty of Sugauli, the Kali River was established as the boundary between British territory and Nepal. The Nepali governor Bam Shah then claimed the villages east of the Kali, and the British conceded Changru and Tinkar on the grounds that the treaty entitled Nepal to territory east of the river. However, when Bam Shah further claimed the villages of Kunti and Nabhi — arguing that the western branch (Kuthi Yankti) should be considered the main stream of the Kali — the claim was firmly rejected by the Governor-General, Lord Moira, in September 1817. The parganah of Byans was thus divided between two countries, with seven villages remaining in British Kumaon and two transferred to Nepal.

Under British administration, the Bhotiya Mehals were governed as part of the Non-Regulation Province of Kumaon, in which the commissioners — notably G. W. Traill, J. H. Batten and Sir Henry Ramsay — exercised broader discretionary powers than in the regulated areas of the plains. The Bhotiya communities spoke Sino-Tibetan languages — Byansi, Chaudansi, Darmiya and Rangkas — distinct from the Indo-Aryan Kumaoni language of the rest of the division.

=== Modern history ===
British rule began on 2 December 1815 when Nepal was forced to sign the Sugauli Treaty. Pithoragarh remained a tehsil under Almora district until 1960 when its status was elevated to that of a district. There was an army cantonment, a church, and a mission school, resulting in the spread of Christianity in the region.

The Bhotiya communities living in the Pithoragarh district historically practised transhumance between summer villages located at higher altitudes, close to the border with Tibet, and winter settlements located at lower altitudes, close to the Himalayan foothills and the Gangetic plains. With transhumance as a base, many of them would engage in annual trade visits to market towns such as Taklakot in western Tibet, and some would practice nomadic pastoralism as well. This way of life came to an abrupt end in the 1962 due to the Sino-Indian War. Trans-Himalayan trade was allowed again since the under 1990s. But unlike in the past, it was now to be conducted under state-imposed regulations and limitations, and was allowed only across the Pithoragarh district's Lipu Lekh pass, whereas in earlier times, in Kumaon and Garwhal, the Trans-Himalayan trade had been conducted across several passes.

In 1997, part of the Pithoragarh district was cut out to form the new Champawat district.

== Demographics ==
Historical population
Year	Pop.	±% p.a.
1901	135,083	—
1911	156,541	+1.49%
1921	157,943	+0.09%
1931	173,716	+0.96%
1941	204,684	+1.65%
1951	230,180	+1.18%
1961	274,226	+1.77%
1971	313,747	+1.36%
1981	365,141	+1.53%
1991	416,647	+1.33%
2001	462,289	+1.04%
2011	483,439	+0.45%

Religions in Pithoragarh district (2011)
Religion	Percent
Hinduism	98.28%
Islam	1.24%
Other or not stated	0.48%
Distribution of religions

According to the 2011 census Pithoragarh district has a population of 483,439, roughly equal to the nation of Suriname. This gives it a ranking of 546th among the 640 districts of India. The district has a population density of 69 inhabitants per square kilometre (180/sq mi). Its population growth rate over the decade 2001–2011 was 5.13%. Pithoragarh has a sex ratio of 1021 females for every 1000 males, and a literacy rate of 82.93%. Scheduled Castes and Scheduled Tribes make up 24.90% and 4.04% of the population respectively.

Native tribes in the district include the Gurjars, Van Rawats, Van Gurjars and Shaukas. Van Rawats are hunter-gatherers. Shaukas are traders. In Pithoragarh the Shaukas are divided into two main tribes. Johari Shaukas and Rung Shaukas. The Johari Shauka community inhabits the areas in Munsiyari while Rung Shaukas tribe are spread among the three valleys of Darma, Chaundas, and Byans. Kangdali Festival, celebrated once every 12 years by inhabitants of Chaundas Valley, is one of the major festivals in this area.

=== Languages ===
Languages of Pithoragarh district (2011)
1. Kumaoni (87.7%)
2. Hindi (7.36%)
3. Nepali (1.50%)
4. Bhotia (1.49%)
5. Others (1.97%)

Kumaoni, with its several dialects, is the most widely spoken language. Natives of the district speak the distinct Soryali dialect. Hindi is the common language between the locals and outsiders, and English is spoken by some people, especially teachers, lecturers, and students in tertiary education.

Several Sino-Tibetan languages of the West Himalayish branch are spoken by small communities. These include the three closely related languages of Byangsi, Chaudangsi, and Darmiya, as well as Rangkas & Rawat. The Van Rawat tribe speaks their own variety of Kumaoni.

The speakers of the West Himalayish languages, who collectively call themselves Rang, inhabit the valleys of Byans, Chaudans and Darma in the extreme north-east of Pithoragarh district.

Pithoragarh district: mother-tongue of population, according to the 2011 Indian Census.
Mother tongue code	Mother tongue	People	Percentage
002007	Bengali	414	0.1%
004001	Dogri	396	0.1%
006102	Bhojpuri	1,654	0.3%
006195	Garhwali	1,634	0.3%
006240	Hindi	35,590	7.4%
006340	Kumauni	423,862	87.7%
006439	Pahari	653	0.1%
013071	Marathi	281	0.1%
014011	Nepali	7,259	1.5%
016038	Punjabi	383	0.1%
022015	Urdu	1,224	0.3%
031001	Bhotia (also called "Jad")	1,325	0.3%
046003	Halam	5,623	1.2%
103003	Rai	263	0.1%
–	Others	2,878	0.6%
Total		483,439	100.0%

== Assembly Constituencies ==
1. Dharchula
2. Didihaat
3. Pithoragarh
4. Gangolihaat (SC)

Formerly

1. Kanalichhina

== Climate ==
Pithoragarh town, being in a valley, is relatively warm during summer and cool during winter. During the coldest months of December and January, the tropical and temperate mountain ridges and high locations receive snowfall and have an average temperature of 5.5–8.0 °C (41.9–46.4 °F). Pithoragarh district has extreme variation in temperature due to the wide range of variations in altitude. The temperature rises from mid-March through mid-June. The areas above 3,500 metres (11,500 ft) remain in a permanent snow cover. Regions lying at 3,000–3,500 metres (9,800–11,500 ft) become snowbound for four to six months. At places like the river gorges at Dharchula, Jhulaghat, Ghat and Sera, temperatures reach 40 °C (104 °F). The annual average rainfall in lower reaches is 360 centimetres (140 in).Sati, Vishwambhar Prasad; Kumar, Kamlesh (2004). Uttaranchal: Dilemma of Plenties and Scarcities. Mittal Publications. ISBN 8170998980. After June the district receives monsoon showers. Winter is a time for transhumance – the seasonal migration of the Bhotiya tribe with their herds of livestock to lower, warmer areas.

=== Seasons ===
- Winter (cold weather): December–March
- Summer (hot weather): March–June
- Season of general rains: North–West monsoon – mid-June to mid-September
- Season of retreating monsoon: September–November

== Glaciers of Pithoragarh ==
Locally, glaciers are known as Gal. Some important glaciers of the district are as follows:

- Milam Glacier
- Namik Glacier
- Ralam Glacier
- Meola Glacier
- Sona Glacier
- Panchchuli Glacier
- Balati Glacier
- Shipu Glacier
- Rula Glacier
- Kalabaland Glacier
- Lawan Glacier
- Northern Lwanl
- Middle Lwanl
- Lower Lwanl
- Bamlas Glacier
- Baldimga Glacier
- Terahar Glacier
- Poting Glacier
- Talkot Glacier
- Sankalpa Glacier
- Lassar Glacier
- Upper Lassar
- Lower Lassar
- Middle Lassar
- Dhauli Glacier
- Baling Golfu Glacier
- Dhauli Glacier
- Sobla Tejam Glacier
- Kali Glacier
- Kuti Glacier
- Yangti Basin Glacier
- Lower Dhauli
- Middle Dhauli
- Upper Dhauli
- Lower Kali
- Upper Kali

== Himalayan peaks of Pithoragarh ==
Peak	Height (m)
Sunanda Devi	7,434
Hardeol	7,151
Trishuli	7,099
Rishi Pahar	6,992
Panchchuli II	6,904
Nanda Kot	6,861
Chiring We	6,559
Rajrambha	6,537
Chaudhara	6,510
Sangthang	6,480
Panchchuli V	6,437
Nagalaphu	6,410
Suitilla (Suj Tilla West)	6,374
Suj Tilla East	6,393
Panchchuli I	6,355
Bamba Dhura	6,334
Burphu Dhura	6,334
Panchchuli IV	6,334
Changuch	6,322
Nanda Gond	6,315
Panchchuli III	6,312
Nanda Pal	6,306
Suli Top	6,300
Kuchela	6,294
Nital Thaur	6,236
Kalganga Dhura	6,215
Jonglingkong or Baba Kailash	6,310
Om Parvat	6,191
Lalla We	6,123
Kalabaland Dhura	6,105
Telkot	6,102
Bainti	6,079
Ikualari	6,059
Nagling	6,041
Menaka Peak	6,000
Trigal	5,983
Yungtangto	5,945
Sankalp	5,929
Laspa Dhura	5,913
Sahdev	5,782
Ralam Dhura	5,630
Gilding Peak	5,629
Shivu	5,255
Tihutia	5,252
Draupadi Peak	5,250
Rambha Kot	5,221
Panchali Chuli	5,220
Gelding	50,29
Dunkhan	5'035
Halsyun	5'105
Lalla We	6'123
Adi Kailash	6'321
Rajrambha	6'537
Deo Damia	6'632
Bamchhu	6'302
Syakaram	6'258
Mangron	6'565
Latu Dhura	6'389
Bati ka Dhura	5'858
Nanda Lapak	5'782
Kalchhu Dhura	5'421
Mapa Dhura	5'206

== Mountain passes of Pithoragarh ==
=== International passes to Tibet ===
Pass	Height (m)
Lampiya Dhura	5,530
Lipu-Lekh pass	5,450
Lowe Dhura	5,562
Mangshya Dhura	5,630
Nuwe Dhura	5,650
Kungri Bingri Pass	5,564

=== Intra-district Himalayan passes ===
Pass	Height (m)
Ghantesh Baba	5,164
Nama pass	5,500
Sinla pass	5,495
Ralam pass	5,630
Keo Dhura	5,439
Belcha Dhura	5,384
Kalganga Dhura	5,312
Traills pass	5,312
Gangchal Dhura	5,050
Birejrang Dhura	4,666
Ghatmila Dhura	
Unta Dhura	5,350
Yangkchar Dhura	4,800
Rur Khan	3,800
Bainti Col	5,100
Longstaff Col	5,910

== Valleys of Pithoragarh ==
- Vyas valley (includes Kuthi Valley and the valley of Kalapani River)
- Kuti-Yangti Valley : Kuti-Yangti valley has 112 glaciers. The passes of Kuti valley Lampiya Dhura (5,553 m), Nuwe Dhura (5,650 m)
- Chaudans valley
- Darma Valley
- Goriganga valley: Goriganga has 128 glaciers with largest Milam glacier having 18 km in length.
- Dhauliganga valley : Those are source of several streams and rivers. Maximum 135 glaciers found in the Dhauliganga valley.
- Johar Valley
- Kalabaland valley
- Kali valley: Lipu Lekh Pass (5,122 m) (India, Tibet, Nepal)
- Lassar Yangti valley
- Ralam valley
- Saur valley
- Ramganga valley :There are 7 glaciers in Ramganga valley and Namik is largest with 2.4 square Km in size.
- Saryu /Sarju Valley
- Gori Gunkha valley : Belcha Dhura pass (5,384 m), Kungri Bhingri Pass (5,564 m), Keo Dhura pass (5,439 m)

== Flora ==
A wide variety of flora exists in the district, including many unique sub-tropical, temperate, and alpine plants. Bryophytes (mosses), pteridophytes (ferns), gymnosperms (conifers), and angiosperms (flowering plants) are present. Rare varieties of orchids are also present in the high-altitude valleys of Milan, Darma, Beyans, and Kuthi. Species present include:

- Abies pindrow
- Aconitum heterophyllum
- Berberis aristata (Kirmod)
- Betula utilis (Himalayan birch or Bhoj Patra)
- Cedrus deodara (Deodar Cedar)
- Cypripedium cordigerum
- Dendrobium normale
- Myrica esculenta (Kafal)
- Nardostachys grandiflora (Jatmasi)
- Pedicularis punctata
- Picrorhiza kurroa (Kutki)
- Pinus roxburghii (Salla or Chir)
- Pinus wallichiana (Blue Pine or Raisalla)
- Prunus cerasoides (Pahiyya)
- Prunus cornuta
- Prunus puddum
- Quercus dilatata
- Quercus incana
- Quercus leucotricophora (Banjh)
- Quercus semicarpifolia
- Rhododendron barbatum (Burans)
- Rhododendron campanulatum
- Rubus ellipticus (Hisalu)
- Saussurea obvallata (Brahm Kamal)
- Saussurea simpsonia
- Taxus wallichiana (Himalayan yew)
- Vanda cristata
- Zanthoxylum armatum (Timur)
- 10–15 kinds of cactus
- Aadu
- Different type of pulses like red and green lentils
- Figs
- Green apples
- Himalayan pears
- Mulberry
- Oranges
- Peaches
- Red apples
- Rye (a local staple)
- Simal
- Soy beans
- Yellow plums

== Tourist attractions ==
- Askot Musk Deer Sanctuary is a 599.93 km^{2} wildlife sanctuary located around Askot near Didihat, in Pithoragarh district of the Himalaya of Kumaon in Uttarakhand, India.
- Berinag is a hill station located 102 Km from Pithoragarh at an altitude of 2010 m. It is famous for the Premium Berinag Tea.
- Chaukori is a hill station located 10 km from Berinag, also with an altitude of 2010 m.
- Munsyari is a hill station in the northern part of the Pithoragarh district. The valley from Munsyari to Milam is known as Johar Valley.
- Pithoragarh Fort is set atop a hill on the outskirts of the town and now serves as a museum.

== Notable people ==
- Anjali Tatrari – Television actress
- Laurie Baker - Architect
- General Bipin Chandra Joshi, PVSM, AVSM, ADC – 17th Chief of Army Staff, Indian Army
- Dan Singh Bisht – businessman and philanthropist
- Lucky Bisht – NSG commando and spy
- Nain Singh Rawat – explorer
- Prakash Pant – politician
- Pushkar Singh Dhami - 10th chief minister of Uttarakhand
- Ratan Singh Raypa – anthropologist
- Mayukh Mahar - politician
- Shekhar Pathak – historian, editor, travel writer, activist
- Unmukt Chand – cricketer
- Vinod Kapri – filmmaker, journalist, and author
- J. S. Titiyal - Indian Ophthalmologist
- Prafulla Chandra Pant- Former Judge of the Supreme Court of India
- Mahendra Singh Mahra - Former Rajya Sabha member

== See also ==
- Kumaoni people
- Kumaon Regiment
- Shauka – Johar
- Chand Kings
- Rung Community
