= Munsiari =

Municipality and town in Kumaon, Uttarakhand, India

Munsyari Munsyār Munsyari
- Sub-division and town
- Munsyari
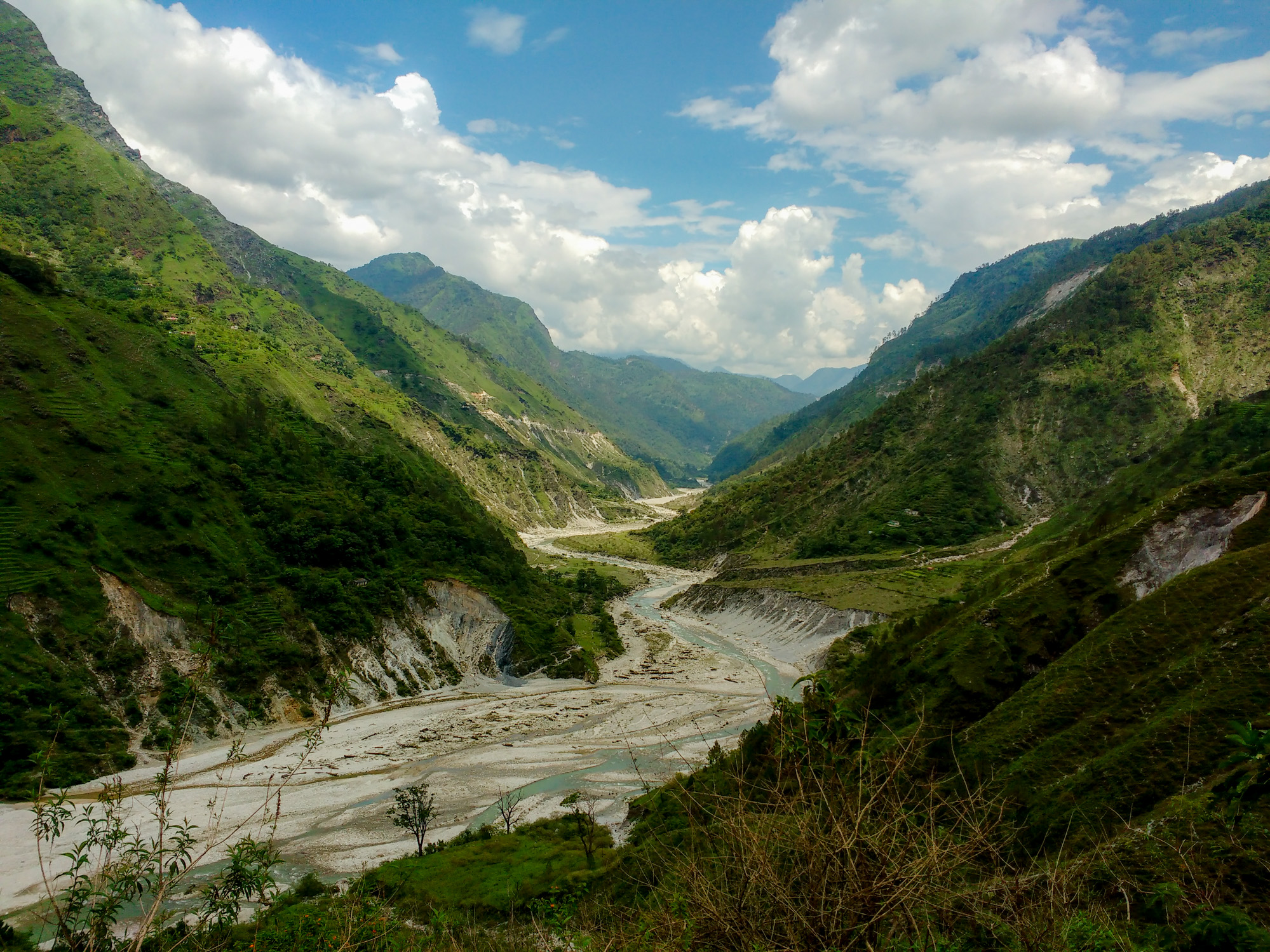
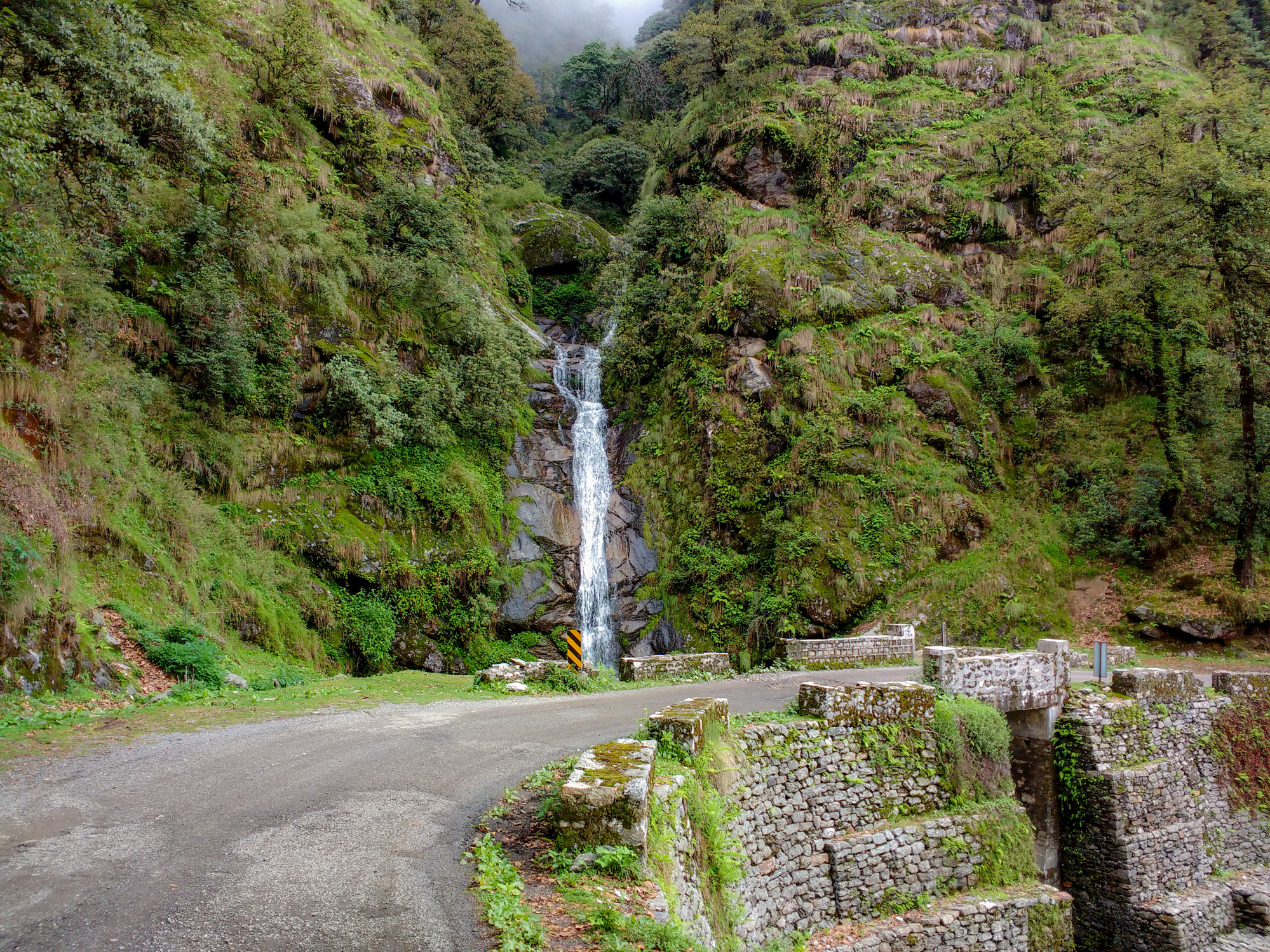
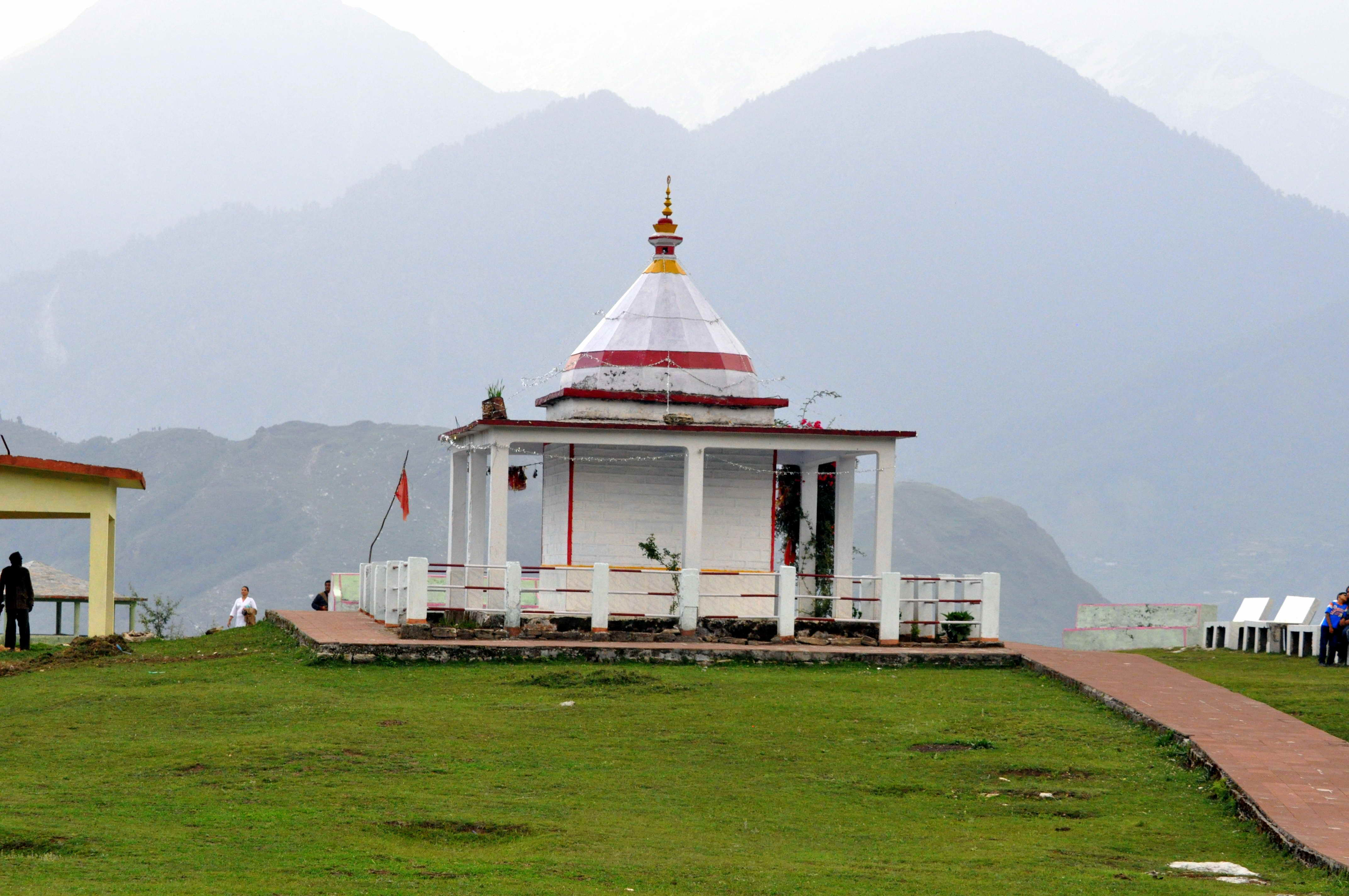
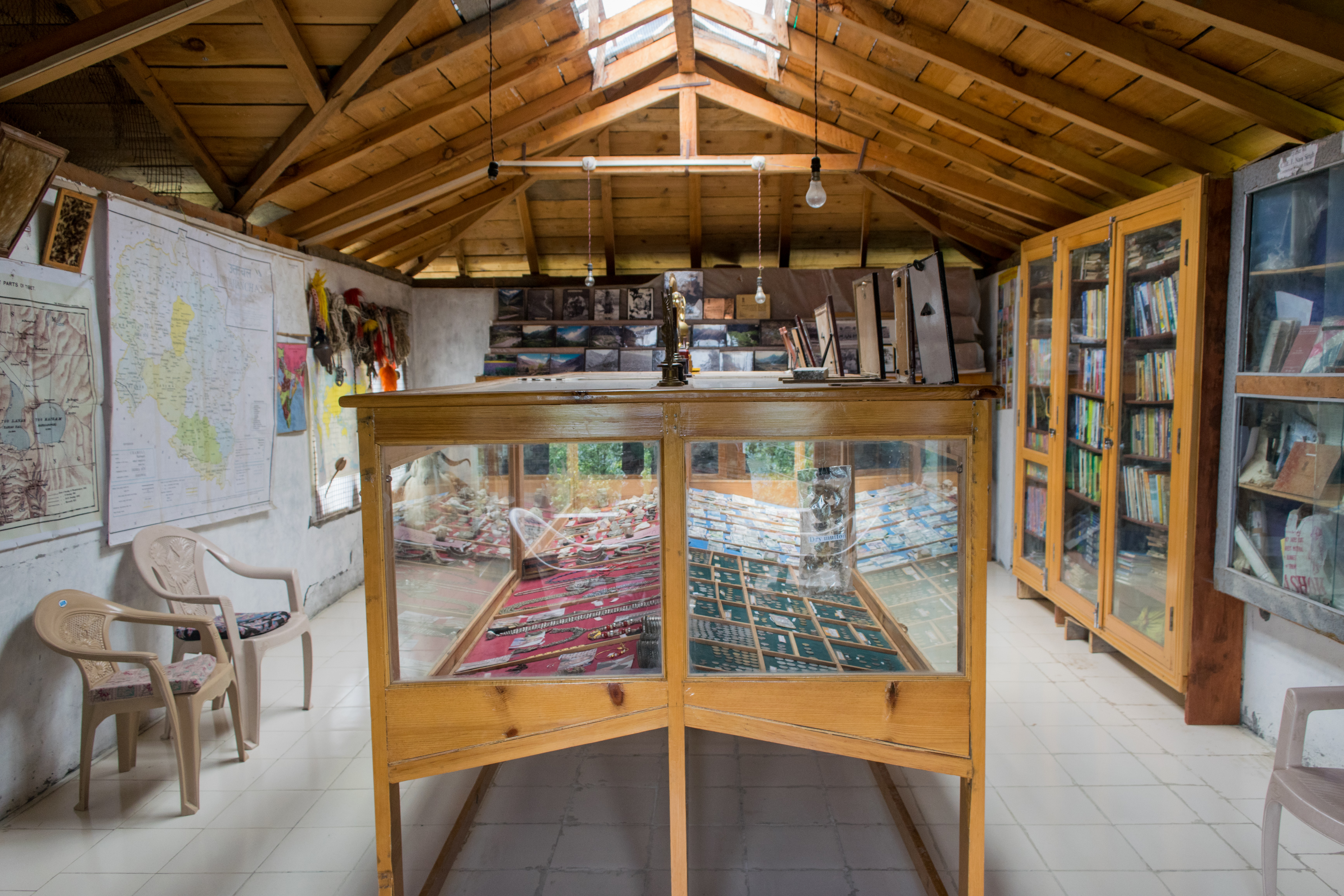
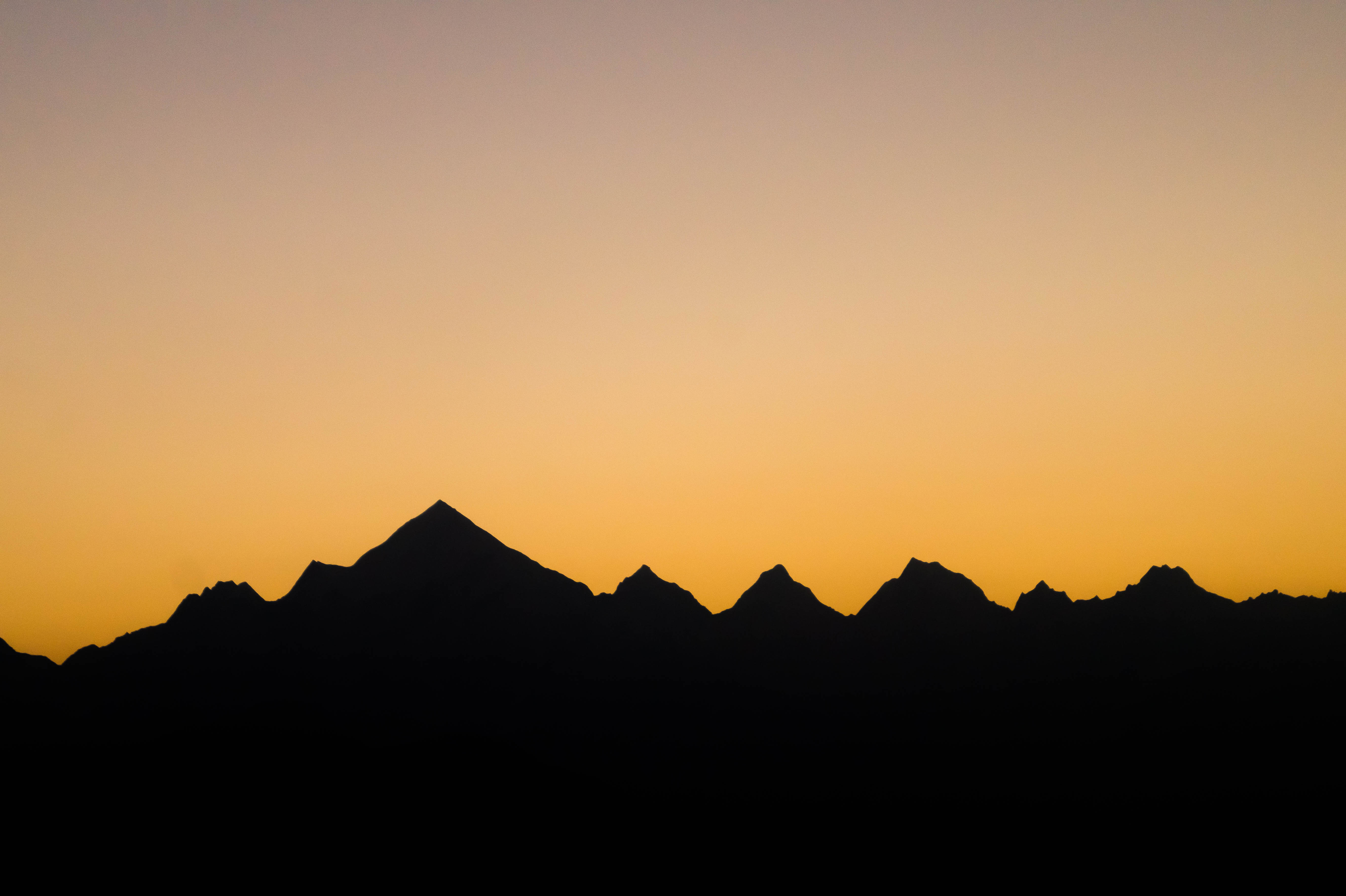
- Clockwise from top: A view of the Gori river flowing through Johar Valley, Birthi Falls, as seen from Thal-Munsiyari road, Nanda Devi Temple, View of Panchchuli Peaks and Tribal Heritage Museum.
- Nickname: Tiksen
- Location in Uttarakhand, India Munsyari (India)
- Coordinates: 30.067413°N 80.238562°E
- Country: India
- State: Uttarakhand
- Division: Kumaon division
- District: Pithoragarh

Government
  - MLA: Harish Singh Dhami (INC)
- Elevation: 2,200 m (7,200 ft)

Languages
  - Official: Hindi
  - Native: Kumaoni
- Time zone: UTC+5:30 (IST)
- PIN: 262554
- Vehicle registration: UK 05
- Website: uk.gov.in

Munsyari (Kumaoni: Munsyār) is the name of the sub-division headquarters, a municipal board, a conglomeration of revenue villages and it also refers to the entire region as Munsiyari Tehsil and Sub Division in the Pithoragarh District in the hill-state of Uttarakhand, India.

It is a hill station and lies at the base of the great Himalayan mountain range, at an elevation of about 2,200 m (7,200 ft) and is a starting point of various treks into the interior of the range.

Dhuska (a dance) being performed by women at Nanda Devi Temple, Munsiyari.

== History ==
Historically, the tract of Munsiyari (originally comprising the villages of Surhing, Gorpata, Darati, and Darkot in the Goriphat patti) served as a vital depot for the Trans-Himalayan trade between Tibet and the plains of India. During the early 20th century, it functioned as the primary winter settlement for the Bhotia traders of the Malla Johar region. Because high-altitude villages like Milam and Laspa were blocked by snow during the winter months, the inhabitants engaged in seasonal transhumance, migrating down the Gori river valley to the comparatively milder climate of Munsiari. The area was noted for its fertile arable land and prosperous trade economy.

== Economy ==
Principally subsistence based agriculture and animal husbandry and allied activities. Many families are dependent on forests and natural resources for their livelihoods.

== Establishment ==
During a summer festival organized in Munsiyari market in 2013, a proposal for granting Munsiyari the status of Nagar Panchayat (lower level Municipality) was passed by the locals. Gram Panchayats attached to the Munsiyari market had also given their consent for this. On 28 February 2014, the Uttarakhand Cabinet decided to grant Nagar Panchayat status to the towns of Munsiyari, Chaukhutia and Naugaon. Shortly afterwards, the then Chief Minister Harish Rawat made an announcement confirming this move while on a visit to the town. The municipal area was to be created by incorporating 5 Gram Panchayats: Mallaghorpatta, Tallaghorpatta, Bunga, Sarmoli and Jainti. An official notification was issued on 7 October 2014, but due to major opposition by the Gram Sabhas, the Nagar Panchayat could not come into existence. In June 2015, several government officials visited the area and tried to initiate talks with local villagers. After all the talks failed, the notification that allowed the formation of Nagar Panchayat was revoked on 22 August 2016. However on 23 October 2023, after the locals agreed, a notification was issued by the Uttarakhand government to make Munsyari a nagar panchayat. In 2024, Munsyari officially became a nagar panchayat and the first elections to the municipal board were held in 2025.

== Natural history ==
=== Birds ===
A part of the administrative region of Munsiari is located in the Gori river basin. As of May 2014 a total of 319 birds have been recorded, constituting a quarter of India's birds. Species richness apart, the Gori river basin harbours many rare, endemic, globally threatened and endangered bird species, including many of the evolutionarily older birds on the Indian sub-continent. The region has been designated by Birdlife International as an Important Bird Area.

=== Lichen Park ===
The Uttarakhand Forest Department has developed a lichen park in Munsiari, which is spread across 1.5 acres. It is India's first lichen park and its development started in 2019.

== See also ==
- Panchchuli
- Gori Ganga River
