= Ratan Singh Raypa =

Indian anthropologist

Ratan Singh Raypa (c. 1940 – 2005; Hindi: रतन सिंह रायपा; also spelled as Ratan Singh Raipa) was an Indian anthropologist. He is known primarily for his work on the Rung culture of the Mahakali valley, located along the western border of India and Nepal.

== Personal life ==
Raypa belonged to Dharchula, India. He obtained a master's degree in geography from Agra University. His thesis at the Agra University was titled 'Budi: a geographical survey of a border village' (1965). He served as a lecturer in the Uttar Pradesh State Education Department. He retired as Human Ecologist from the Anthropological Survey of India, Northwest Regional office.

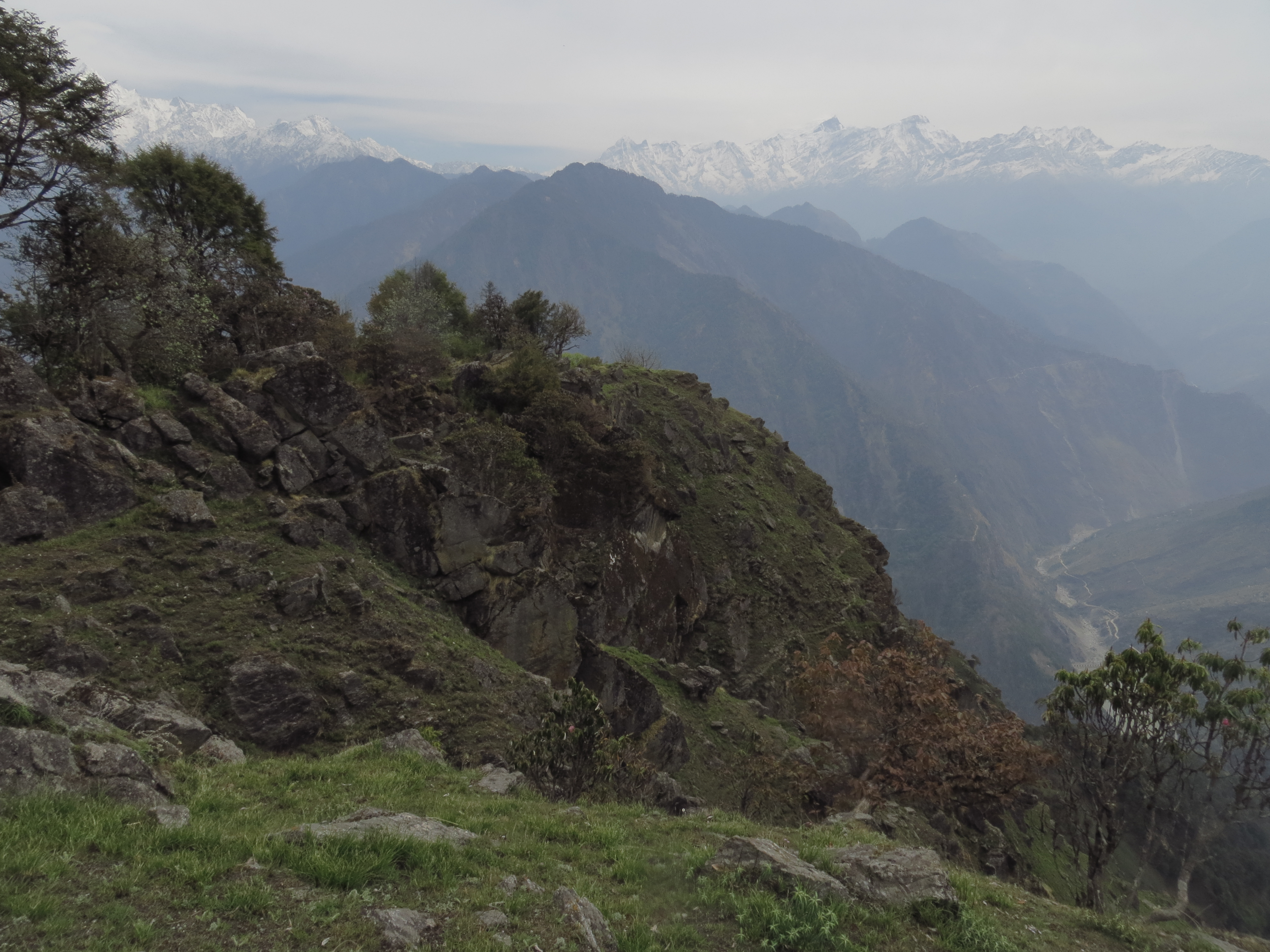
The Kumaon Himalayas near Dharchula, the region traditionally inhabited by the Rung community.

== Book on Rung community ==
Raypa is known for his Hindi book on the Rungs, titled Shauka: Simavarti Janjati (1974), both among academics and the wider public.

Christoph Bergmann of Germany's Heidelberg University writes that Raypa's book, Shauka: Simavarti Janjati, alongside ones by Draupadi Garbyal and Sher Singh Pangtey, 'delivered new interpretations of the historical, ethnic, cultural, religious and social distinctions that would qualify ‘the Bhotiyas’ of Kumaon as a tribe', or 'janjati' in Hindi. Bergmann adds that Raypa, like the two other Rung scholars he named above, adopted the ethnonym 'Shauka' for the people about whom they wrote, i.e. the Rungs of Kumaon. 'Shauka’ is the preferred self-designation of the Bhotiyas living in the Johar valley and is frequently used by all Kumaoni Bhotiyas when speaking and writing about their community in Hindi. Bergmann remarks that Raypa's book was addressed to a Hindi-speaking readership, since he intended to disprove 'the dominant public perception of ‘the Bhotiyas’ as some sort of ‘crypto-Buddhists ’ (Bergmann et al. 2008 )'. This book also sought to develop new hypotheses about the immigration of the original Bhotiya settlers from places other than the Tibetan plateau. The overall intention of the book was to create a narrative of the Rungs as members of the Indian nation, and to distance this group from its Tibetan affinities.

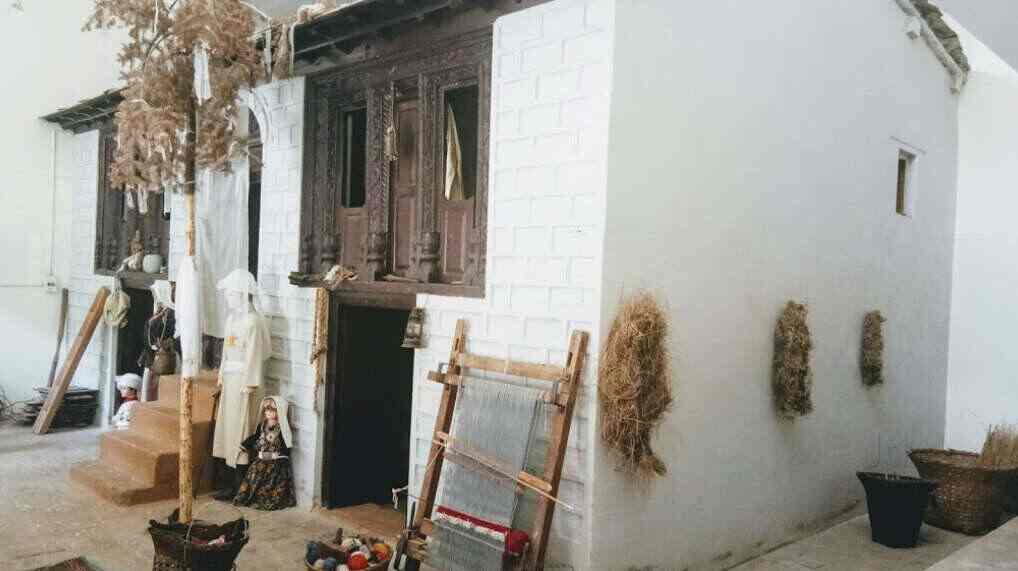
Model of a traditionally-built Rung home, at the Rung Museum in Dharchula.

== Bibliography ==
- Raypa, Ratan Singh. (1974). Shauka: Simavarti Janjati (in Hindi). Raypa Brothers, Dharchula.
- Raypa, Ratan Singh. (1978, unpublished). Ecological Adaptation of Onge of Little Andaman. Anthropological Survey of India, Port Blair.
- Raypa, Ratan Singh. Dhan ke Geet.
- Raypa, Ratan Singh. (1992). 'Ecological Adaptation of the Bhotias of Kali Basin of U P Hills'. In Manish Kr. Raha (ed.) The Himalayas and the Himalayans. Anthropological Survey of India.
- Raypa, Ratan Singh (1994). People of India: Nagaland, Vol. XXXIV (K.S. Singh et al. (eds.)). Seagull Books, Calcutta.
- Raypa, Ratan Singh. (1996, unpublished). Ecology, Environment, and Human Population in India: The Jaunsaris of Jaunsar Bawar. Anthropological Survey of India, Dehradun.
