= Bhado =

Bhado is a village under Chanchal, in the Malda district of the Indian state of West Bengal. It located 347 km (215 miles) north of Kolkata the state capital.

== Economy ==
Mango and jute are the most notable products. Their variety of mango is exported across the world.

== Administrative ==
Ratual community development block has an area of 225.17 km and is a panchayat zone. Three villages are there: Balia, Bihari and Rampur. The village occupies around 10 square kilometres (3.9 sq mi).

== Education ==
The village has two high schools. The village has a madrasa known as Bhado Jamia Islahul Muslamin. The area ispredominantly Muslim and a lot of Hindus are living together. The two largest schools are Battala Adarsh High Madrasah and BSB High school. Private schools are Bhado Bage Sahin Academy, Mainuddin Memorial School, Sabuj Kuri, Dream Land Academy.

== Religion ==
Shakti Mishra's Durga Mandir at Kahala, a temple with underground construction and an idol of Durga, made of pure gold, is 6.5 km away.
