= Rang community =

Indigenous tribe of Nepal/India

The Rang community (also spelled 'Rung' community) are a Tibeto-Burman ethnic group dwelling historically in the upper parts of the Johar valley, Darma valley, and Mahakali valley in India and Nepal. Some of them live in the Chameylia valley of Nepal. In Nepal and in the Johar valley of India, they are also known as the Shauka; the Rungbas of the Mahakali and Darma valleys are called 'Shauka'.The Darma Valley has fourteen villages, namely, Filam, Go, Dhakar, Tidang, Sela, Chal, Nagling, Baling, Dugtu, Dantu, Saun, Baun, Marccha, and Sipu.

== Languages ==
The Rang community speaks three kinds of Tibeto-Burman languages - Vyansi, Chaudangsi and Darma.

== History ==
Rung community are the descendants of GugeTsaparang locally spelled as GugeChabrang. Zhangzhung is an extinct Sino-Tibetan language that was spoken in Zhangzhung in what is now western Tibet. Because of indigenous tribe with no language script they didn't even know exactly where they came from.

== Livelihoods ==
=== Historic ===
The Rung community traditionally practices transhumance. The community is listed as indigenous tribe both in India and Nepal. Historically, the Rung community had Trans-Himalayan trade ties with partner traders in western Tibet. Their traditional lifestyle included annual cycles of transhumance between lower, winter settlements, and upper, summer settlements higher up in the tributary valleys of the Mahakali river. During these cycles of transhumance, some of them would continue further north with merchandise to trade in the seasonal trade marts of western Tibet, laden on long lines of goats and sheep. Some would stay back in the upper villages, practising agriculture. A few others would practice nomadic pastoralism. However, following the Sino-Indian War of 1962, the Trans-Himalayan trade came to an abrupt halt.

=== Since 1990s ===
The trade with Tibet was resumed in the 1990s under more state-regulated conditions and regulations. Pastoralism declined over the decades in significance too, as a means of livelihood among the Rung. These old livelihoods were to a significant degree replaced by medicinal herb collecting, and migrating to towns and cities for education and to look for jobs.

The Rung/Shauka communities on the two sides of the Mahakali river continue to share close ties, despite the Kalapani territory dispute between India and Nepal at the northern end of the valley.

== See also ==
- Ratan Singh Raypa
