= Panchachuli =

Mountain group in Uttarakhand, India

Panchchuli
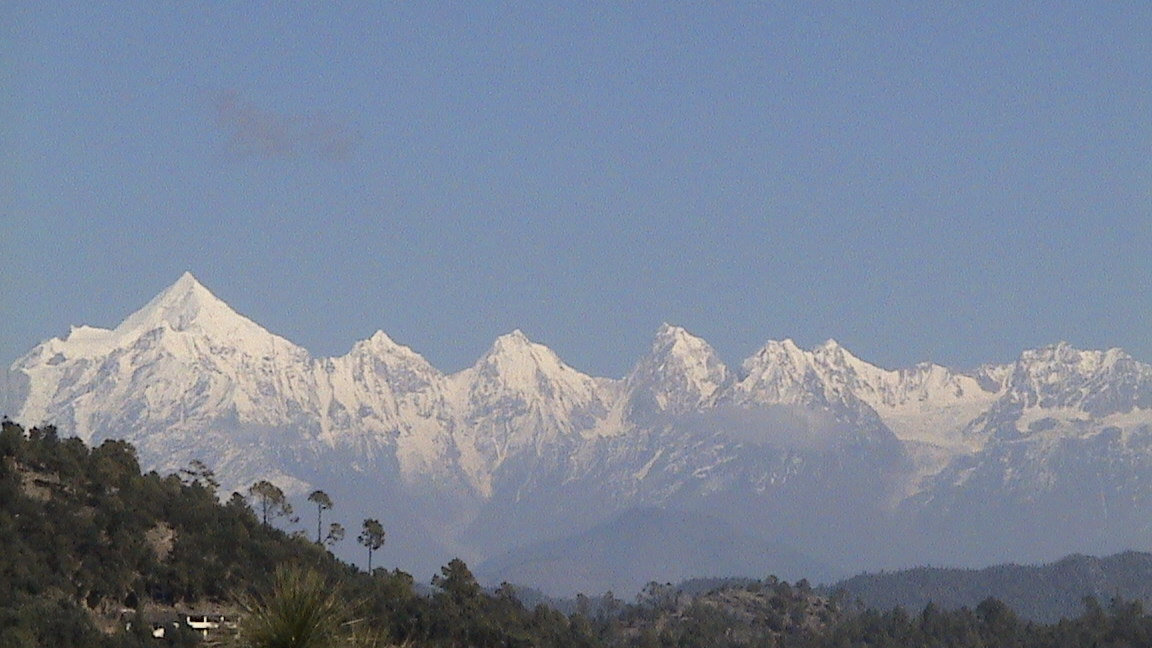
- Panchchuli from Chaukori

Highest point
- Elevation: 6,904 m (22,651 ft)
- Prominence: 1,614 m (5,295 ft)
- Listing: Ultra
- Coordinates: 30°12′51″N 80°25′39″E

Geography
- Location within Uttarakhand Location within Tibet Location within India
- Location: Pithoragarh, Uttarakhand, India
- Parent range: Kumaon Himalaya

Climbing
- First ascent: 1973 by an Indo-Tibetan Border Police expedition, led by Mahendra Singh – Panchchuli-2 (6,904 m)

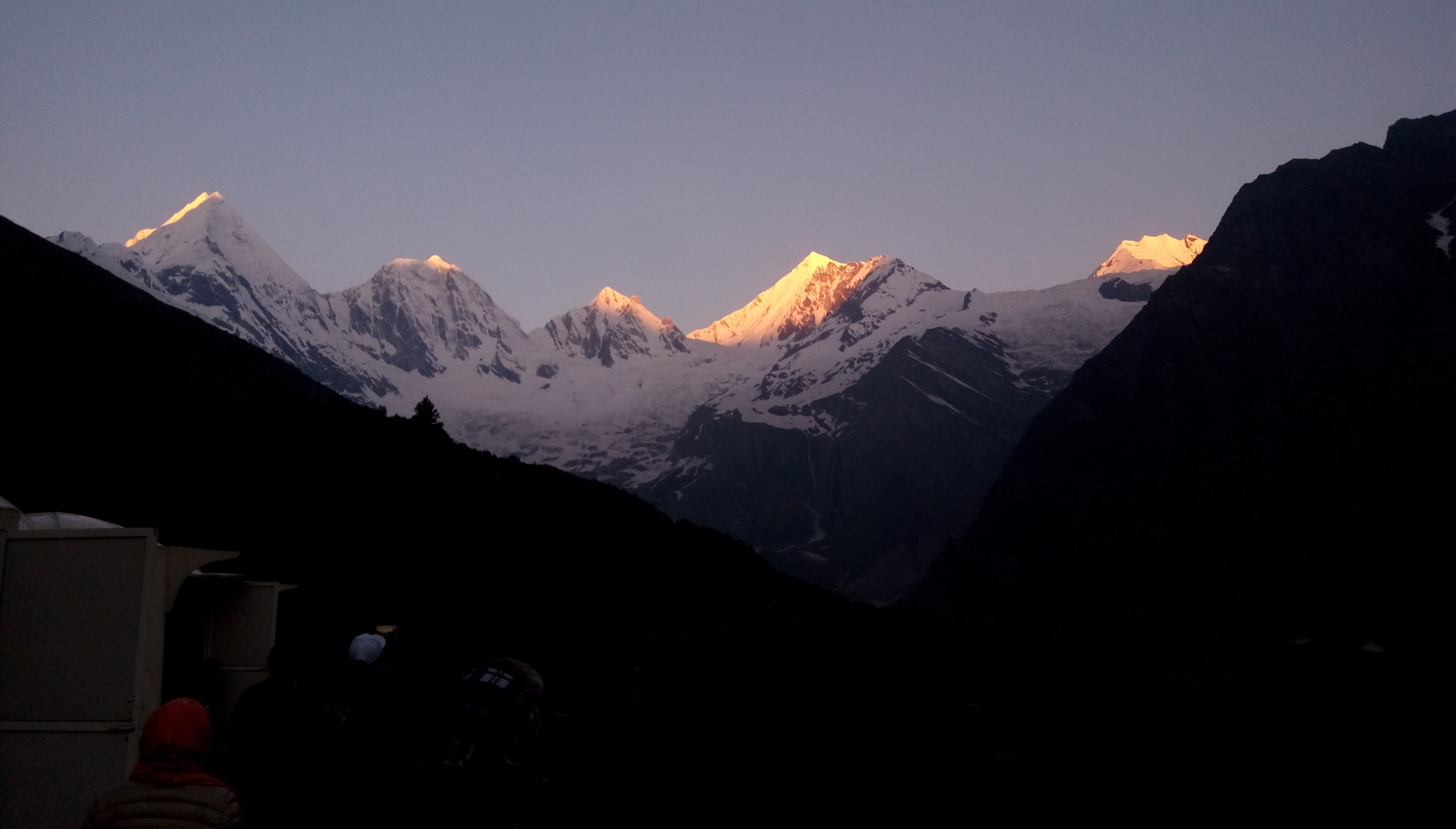
Golden view of Panchachuli Peaks at sunrise, as seen from Darma Valley.

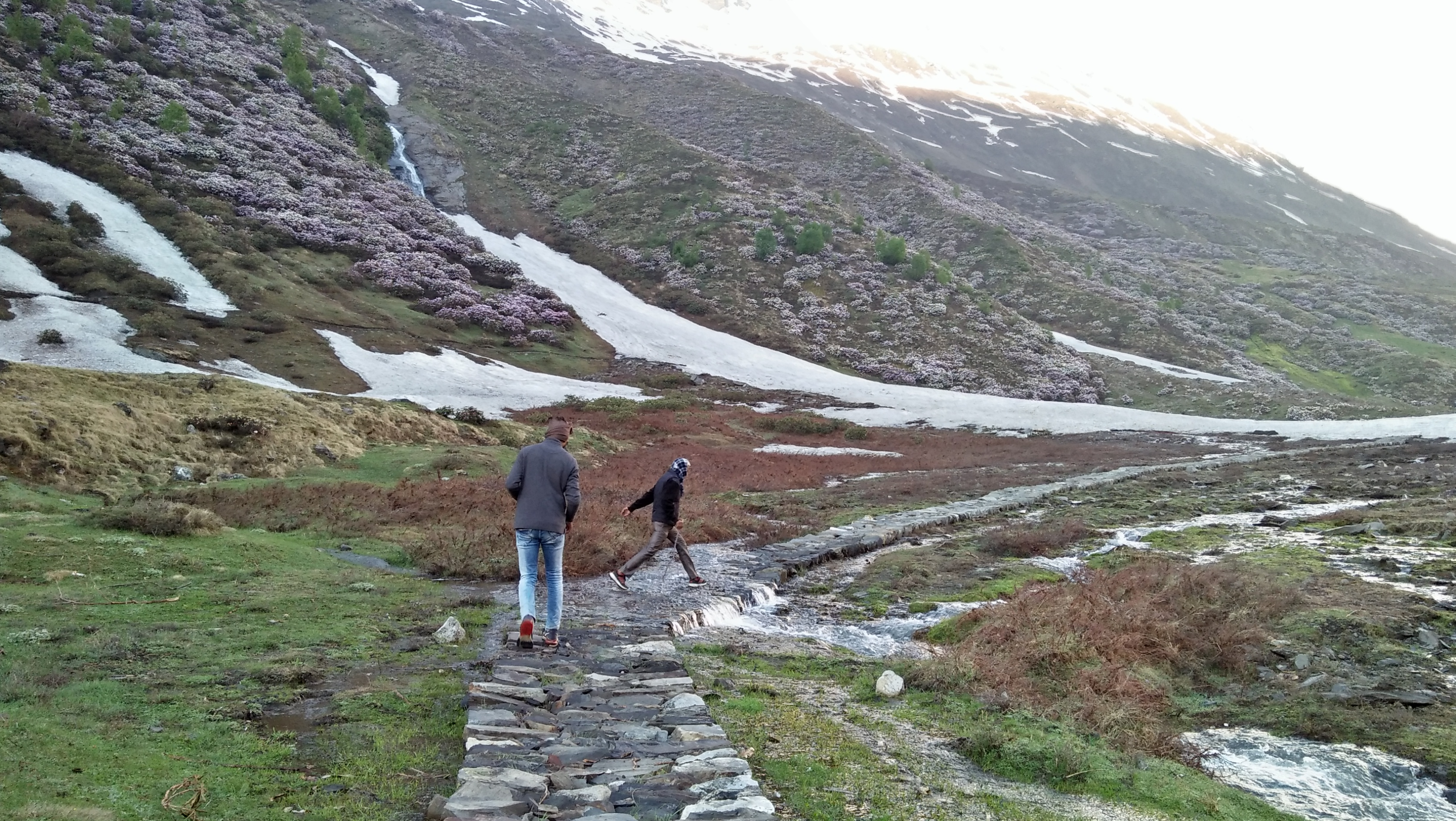
Panchachuli trek covered with snow and blooming Rhododendrons in summers.

The Panchachuli (पंचाचुली) peaks are a group of five snow-capped Himalayan peaks lying at the end of the eastern Kumaon region, near the Dugtu village in Darma valley. The peaks have altitudes ranging from 6,334 metres (20,781 ft) to 6,904 metres (22,651 ft). They form the watershed between the Gori and the Darmaganga valleys. Panchachuli is also located on the Gori Ganga-Lassar Yankti divide. The group lies 138 km (86 mi) from Pithoragarh. The first ascent of this range (Panchchuli 1) was done by an Indo-Tibetan Border Police (ITBP) team in 1972, via the Uttari Balati glacier, led by Major Hukam Singh.

The five peaks on the Panchchuli massif are numbered from northwest to southeast. The highest peak is Panchchuli II, which was first scaled by an Indo-Tibetan Border Police expedition, led by Mahendra Singh, on 26 May 1973. One theory of the group's name is derived from the legendary Pandavas's "Five Chulis" (cooking hearths).

== Five peaks of Panchachuli ==
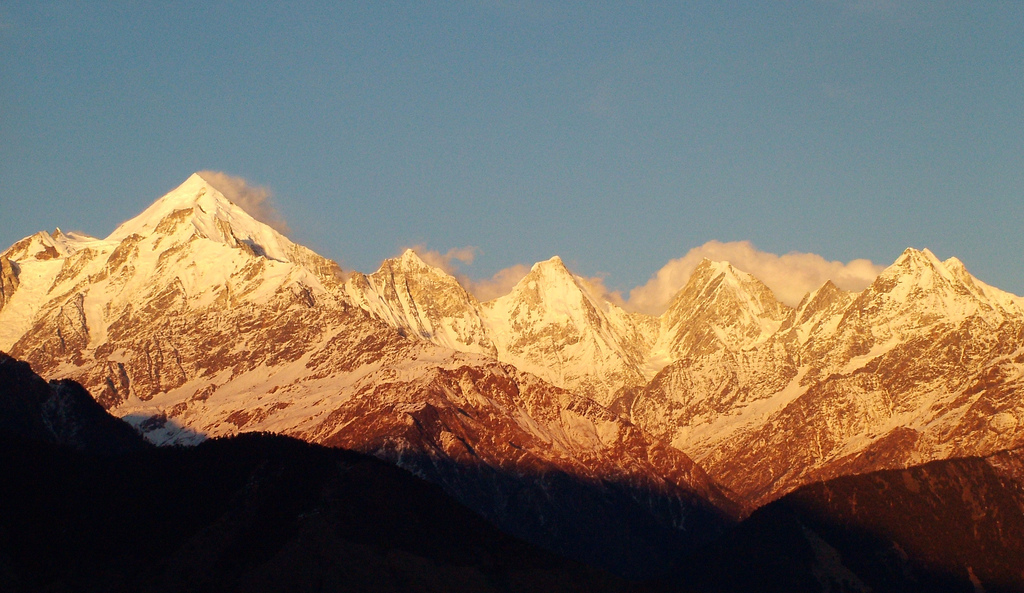
Panchchuli Peaks at Sunset, near Munsiyari

=== Panchachuli-1 (6,355 m) ===
The first ascent of this peak was done by an Indo-Tibetan Border Police (ITBP) team in 1972, via the Uttari Balati glacier, led by Major Hukam Singh. The coordinates of this peak are Latitude 30°13'12" and Longitude 80° 25'12".

=== Panchachuli-2 (6,904 m) ===
This is the highest peak in the group and the highest peak lying entirely in the Kumaon region. It was first climbed successfully by an Indo-Tibetan Border Police team, led by Mahendra Singh, on 26 May 1973. The team climbed from the Balati plateau and via the southwest ridge to the summit. The coordinates of the peak are Latitude 30°12'51" and Longitude 80°25'39".

=== Panchachuli-3 (6,312 m) ===
Though this peak has been not climbed, there have been a few expeditions and attempts to do so. The first attempt was in 1996 via the Dakshini Balati Glacier on the Munsiyari side. This attempt ended after an accident and an avalanche occurred. The second attempt was done in 1998, by a large Indian Army expedition, led by Colonel Bhatt of the Engineer Corps of the Indian Army, via the Duktu Glacier on the Dhauli Ganga river side. This too was not successful as the team summiting had an accident on the final approach ridge. In 2001, a 16-member Indian expedition led by Pradeep Kr. Kar planned an ascent of Panchachuli-3 via the eastern approach. However, after assessing the formidable terrain and significant objective hazards, the team prudently shifted focus to a nearby unnamed peak (5,242 m) east of Panchachuli V. On May 22, 2001, this alternative summit was successfully reached by team members S. Majumdar, Arup Saha, Moloy Kanti Haider, and Pradeep Kr. Kar, marking a noteworthy achievement though Panchachuli-3 itself remained unconquered.

Other reports of a successful climb have not been independently verified.

The coordinates of this peak are Latitude 30°12'00" and Longitude 80°26'24".

=== Panchachuli-4 (6,334 m) ===
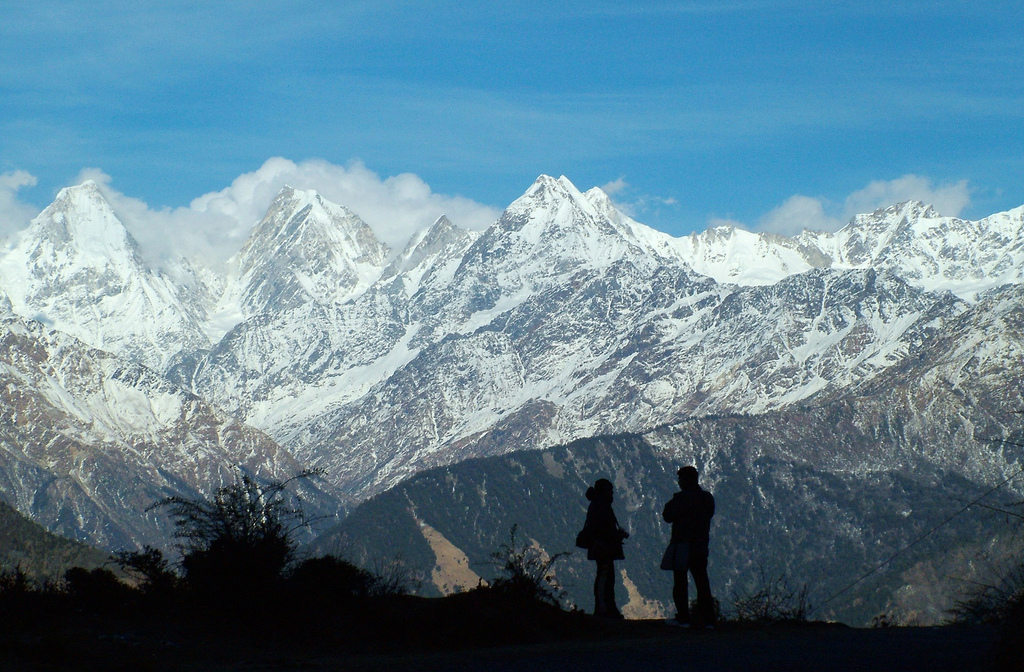
Panchchuli Peaks, from near Munsiyari, Uttarakhand

The first ascent of this peak was made in 1995 by a New Zealand expedition led by John Nankervis. The expedition members who summited were; John Nankervis (Wellington), Peter Cammell (Auckland), John Cocks (Dunedin), and Nick Shearer (Oamaru). Peter Platts (Christchurch) assisted the expedition as far as Camp 2. The coordinates of this peak are Latitude 30°11'24" and Longitude 80°27'00".

=== Panchachuli-5 (6,437 m) ===
The first ascent of this peak was made in 1992 by an Indo-British team jointly led by mountaineers Chris Bonington and Harish Kapadia from the South Ridge. Stephen Venables was one of the members of the team who successfully summited, but had an accident during his descent. A daring rescue operation by the Indian Air force helped evacuate him to safety.

The coordinates of this peak are Latitude 30°10'48" and Longitude 80°28'12".

== Approaches to Pancha-Chuli ==
1. Eastern approach: via the Sona Glacier and Meola Glacier, Darma Valley, Dharchula.
2. Western approach: through the Uttari Balati Glacier via Balati Plateau.

== See also ==
- List of ultras of the Himalayas
