= Pithoragarh =

City in Kumaon division, Uttarakhand, India

- City
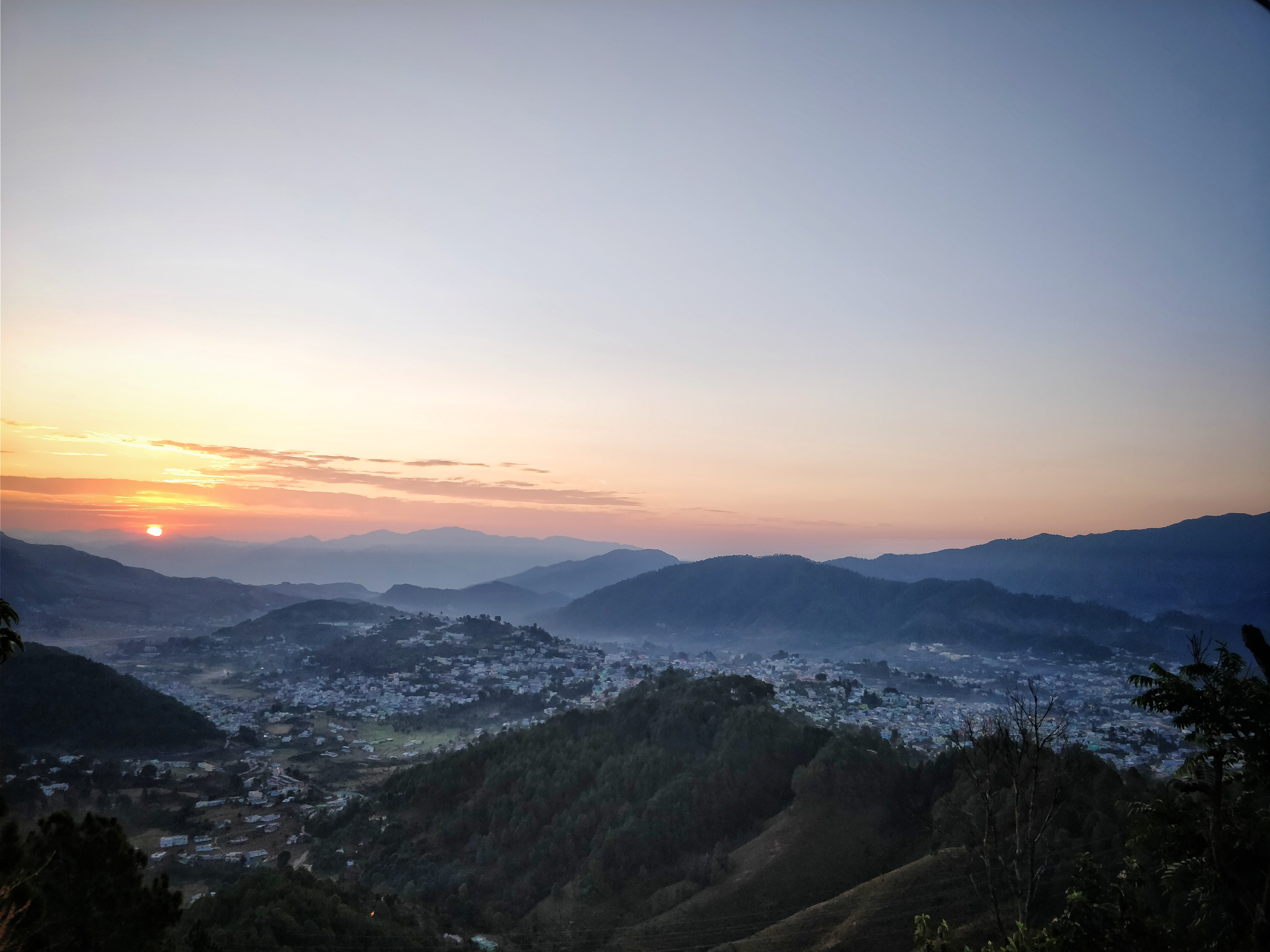
- View of Pithoragarh city, Uttarakhand during Sunrise

- Location in Uttarakhand, India Pithoragarh (India)
- Coordinates: 29.58°N 80.22°E
- Country: India
- State: Uttarakhand
- District: Pithoragarh

Government
  - Type: Municipal Corporation
  - Body: Pithoragarh Municipal Corporation
  - Mayor: Kalpana Deolal (BJP)
  - MLA: Mayukh Singh Mahar (INC)
  - Lok Sabha MP: Ajay Tamta (BJP)
- Elevation: 1,627 m (5,338 ft)

Population (2011)
  - Total: 56,044
  - Rank: 1st in Hill Town in Uttarakhand
- Demonym: Pithoragarhiya (Kumaoni)

Language
  - Native: Kumaoni
  - Official: Hindi, Sanskrit
  - Literacy: 92.25% (2011)
- Time zone: UTC+5:30 (IST)
- PIN: 262501
- Telephone code: 915964
- Vehicle registration: UK-05
- Website: pithoragarh.nic.in

Pithoragarh (Kumaoni: Pithor'garh) is a Himalayan town and a municipal corporation in Pithoragarh district, Kumaon division, Uttarakhand state, northern India. It is the largest hill town in Uttarakhand.

== Etymology ==
The town was named after a fort built in it, and the district was named after the town. There are two local legends for who built and named the fort: either Piru a.k.a. Prithvi Gosain, during the Chand dynasty, naming it "Prithvigarh", which over time became "Pithoragarh", or a Gurkha raja named Pithora.

== History ==
Pithoragarh city and its surrounding areas were part of the Manaskhand region, which extended from the Kailash Mountain in the north to Bhabar & Terai in the south, as mentioned in the Skanda Purana. The Asuras and Nagas appear to be the earliest inhabitants of the region, who were later superseded by the Kiratas, Khasas and the Kunindas. The Kuninda Kings of the region may have become the feudatories of the Kushana kings, who held sway over the region in the last quarter of the 1st century AD.

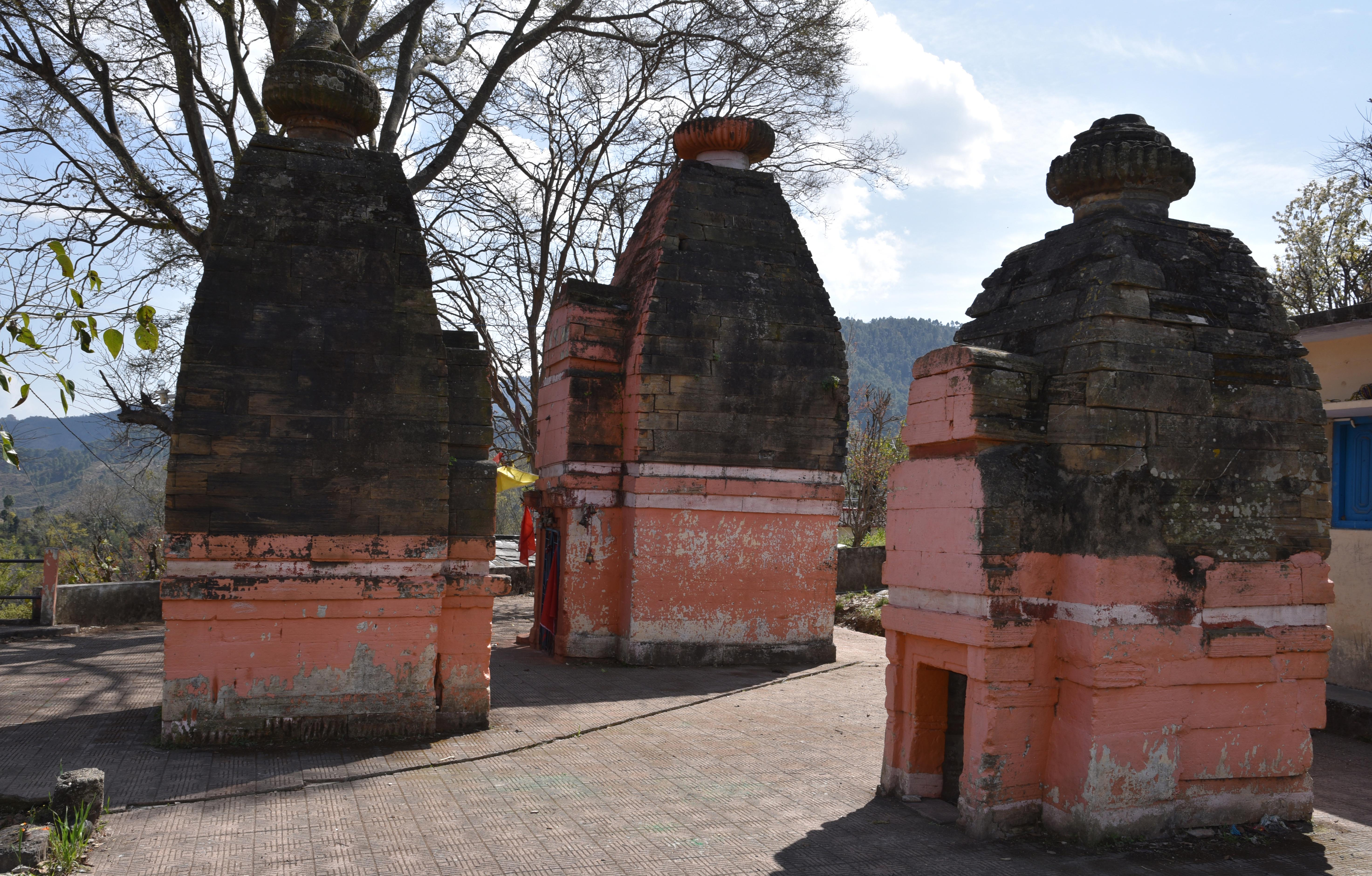
Group of Temples at Kasni were built in 11th century during the rule of Katyuri kings.

The region subsequently came under the Kurmanchal kingdom, which had its capital first at Jyotirmath and then at Karikeyapura (Modern day Baijnath) in the Katyur Valley. The Group of Temples at Kasni village (3 km from city centre) were built in the 11th century during the rule of Katyuri kings.

Upon the disintegration of the Katyuris and fall of the kingdom in the 13th century, Pithoragarh came under the rule of Bam kings of Saur. The Bam kings were vassals to the Raikas of Doti and were a branch of the Katyuri kings. They had their capital at Udaipur near Pithoragarh. However, the Rajas used to come down to Rameshwar and Bailorkol during the winter months. The Bam kings, who ruled over Saur were:

1. Karakil Bam
2. Kakil Bam
3. Chanari Bam
4. Arki Bam
5. Jnani Bam
6. Shakti Bam
7. Vijai Bam
8. Hari Bam

In the fifteenth century, King Bharti Chand of Champawat amassed a huge army, and started plundering and killing in the regions ruled by the Doti Kings. This resulted in a war, which lasted for 12 years, and ended with a victory for the Chands. After the death of Bharti Chand in 1462, Nagmalla, the king of Doti attacked his son, Ratna Chand, who was successful in defending himself. Nagmalla was killed in the war and the Bams became feudatories of the Chands. The pargana of Saur came under direct control of the Kingdom of Kumaon in the sixteenth century during the rule of King Balo Kalyan Chand, when it was given to him by the Raika king of Doti as a dowry for marrying his daughter.

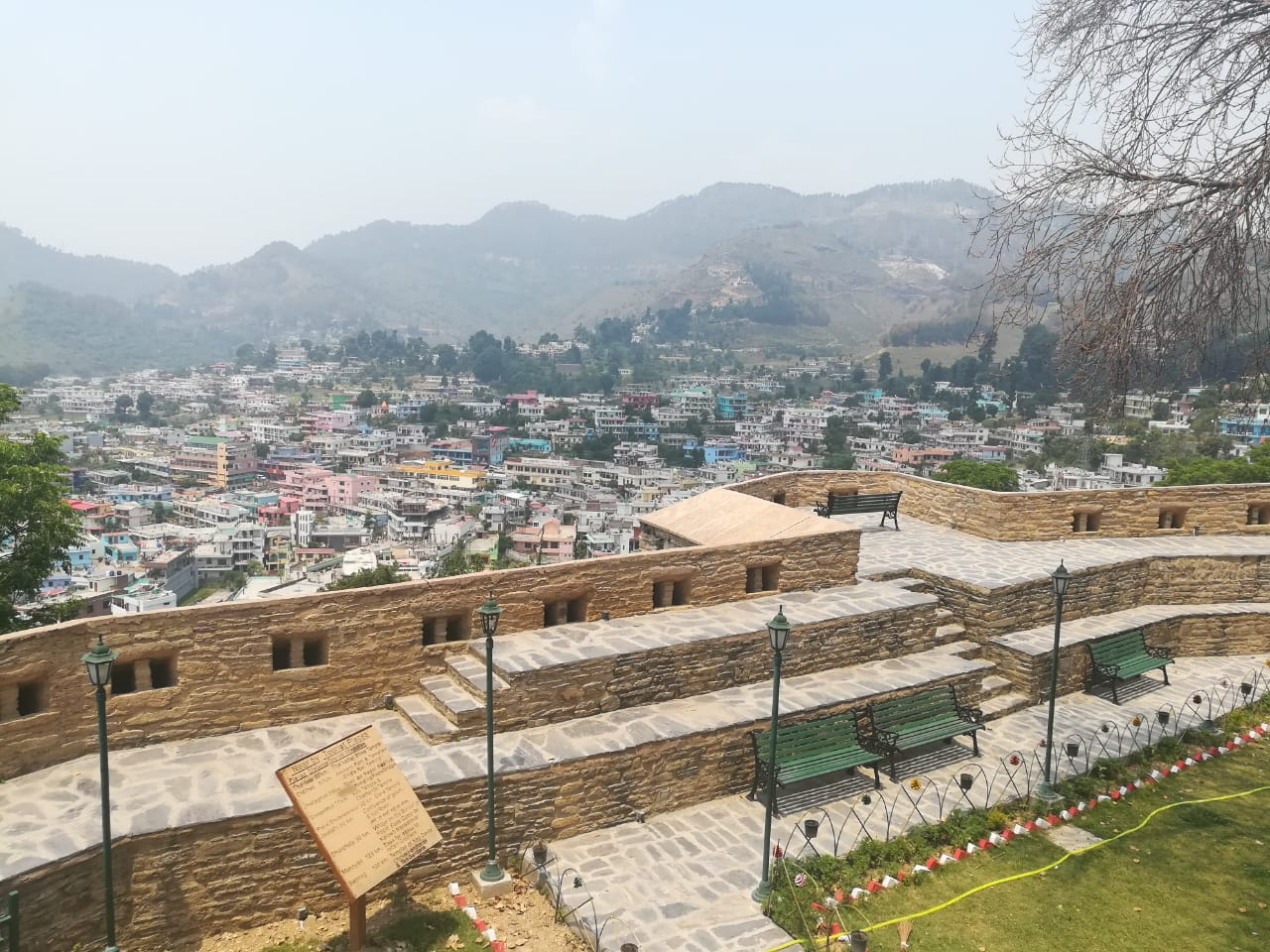
A view of Pithoragarh town from the Pithoragarh Fort (also known as London Fort)

In 1790, the Chand kings built a new fort on the hill where the present Girls Inter College is situated. This fort was destroyed by the Indian government in 1962 after China attacked India. The Chand rule, at its zenith, is seen as one of the most prominent empires in Kumaon. Their rule also coincided with a period of cultural resurgence. Archaeological surveys point towards the development of culture and art forms in this period.

A branch of the Indian National Congress was established in the region in 1912, and in 1916, many people from Pithoragarh attended the Lucknow session of Congress. The Non-cooperation movement was started in the region in 1921. In 1930, 10 people from Pithoragarh participated in the Civil disobedience movement. Subsequently, the Congress won the Pithoragarh seat in the Provincial Elections in 1937. The Quit India Movement of 1942 found greater support in Pithoragarh, and about 150 persons were arrested while several were fined. The Congress won the Pithoragarh seat again in the General Elections of 1945 for the Provincial Assembly, and in 1947, along with the rest of India, this region also won independence from the British Rule.

== Geography ==
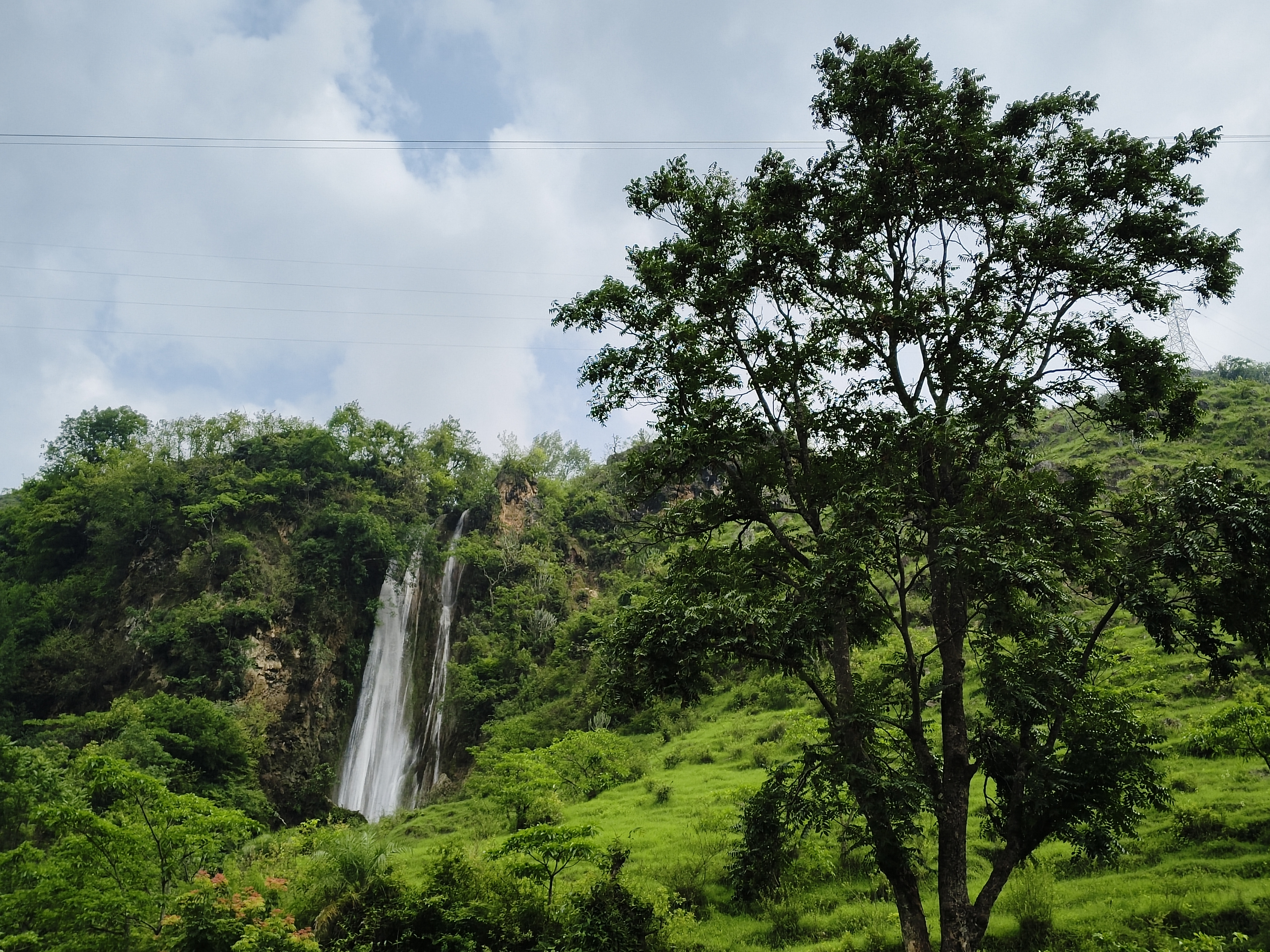
Jagir Khet Waterfall

Pithoragarh is located at 29.58°N 80.22°E. in the district of Pithoragarh, Uttarakhand, India. It lies in the revenue division of Kumaon and is located 188 km northeast of Nainital, the administrative headquarters of Kumaon. It has an average elevation of 1,627 metres (5,338 feet). It is situated in the centre of the western half of the Saur Valley. The valley is spread across around 50 square kilometers. The district includes several high-altitude Himalayan peaks, including Bamdev Parvat, a 5,755-metre-high peak located in the eastern Himalayan region of Pithoragarh. The peak forms part of the district’s mountainous landscape and holds cultural and religious significance in local traditions associated with Vamadeva, an aspect of Lord Shiva. According to the Bureau of Indian Standards, on a scale ranging from I to V in order of increasing susceptibility to earthquakes, the city lies inside seismic zone V. It lies in the Moderate damage risk (B) area in the Wind & Cyclone Zone and is declared a No Flood Zone.

=== Climate ===
Pithoragarh has a monsoon-influenced climate. The summer season from April to mid-June is moderately warm with occasional thunderstorms, whilst the monsoon season from mid-June to mid-September is humid with heavy showers almost daily. This gives way to a warm and sunny autumn season. The winter season brings pleasant afternoons, very cold mornings, and spells of frontal rain accompanied by sparse snowfall.

Climate data for Pithoragarh
Month	Jan	Feb	Mar	Apr	May	Jun	Jul	Aug	Sep	Oct	Nov	Dec	Year
Mean daily maximum °C (°F)	13.7 (56.7)	15.5 (59.9)	20.7 (69.3)	25.9 (78.6)	28.7 (83.7)	28.5 (83.3)	25.9 (78.6)	25.4 (77.7)	24.9 (76.8)	23.3 (73.9)	19.7 (67.5)	15.8 (60.4)	22.3 (72.1)
Daily mean °C (°F)	7.8 (46.0)	9.4 (48.9)	14.2 (57.6)	19.2 (66.6)	22.1 (71.8)	23.1 (73.6)	21.9 (71.4)	21.6 (70.9)	20.4 (68.7)	17.4 (63.3)	13.2 (55.8)	9.7 (49.5)	16.7 (62.1)
Mean daily minimum °C (°F)	1.9 (35.4)	3.4 (38.1)	7.7 (45.9)	12.6 (54.7)	15.7 (60.3)	17.7 (63.9)	17.9 (64.2)	17.8 (64.0)	16 (61)	11.5 (52.7)	6.8 (44.2)	3.5 (38.3)	11 (52)
Average precipitation mm (inches)	37.4 (1.47)	42.8 (1.69)	39.4 (1.55)	34.7 (1.37)	56.7 (2.23)	164.8 (6.49)	317.3 (12.49)	305.2 (12.02)	174.4 (6.87)	47.9 (1.89)	7.3 (0.29)	16.7 (0.66)	1,244.5 (49.00)
Average precipitation days	3.4	3.8	3.7	3.1	4.1	10.9	16.5	17.6	10.5	2.9	1.2	1.3	79.1
Source: Weatherbase

== Government and politics ==
Pithoragarh is an urban town with a Nagar Nigam, or municipal corporation, spread over an area of 9 square km. It is divided into 40 wards for the sake of administration. It is also part of the Almora Lok Sabha Constituency, and has BJP MP Ajay Tamta representing the city and is a part of the Pithoragarh Vidhan Sabha constituency, represented by INC's Mayukh Mahar.

Pithoragarh town, before the creation of a municipal board, was administered as a Town Area by a committee consisting of 10 members and a chairman. The Municipality of Pithoragarh came into existence on 24 November 1962, and the members and the chairman of Town Area Committee became its members. The board was, however, dissolved on 12 March 1963, and the town was then administered by the District Magistrate, who was the ex-officio chairman of the board under the U.P. Municipalities Act of 1916. There was no elected body, and the affairs were supervised by an Officer-in-charge (a deputy collector) to whom the powers were delegated by the District Magistrate. The town became a municipal corporation in 2024.

== Culture ==
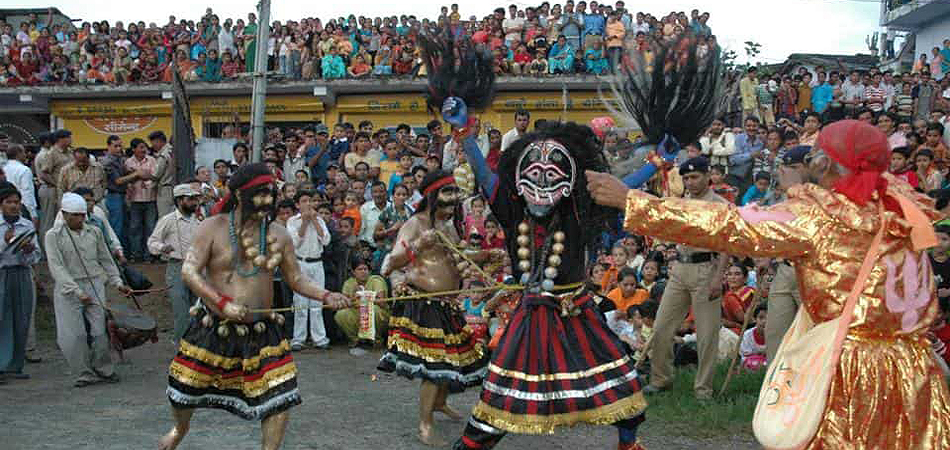
Hiljatra in Pithoragarh

=== Festivals ===
Chaitol This festival is celebrated during the Hindu month of Chaitra, the first month of the Hindu calendar. This festival is celebrated in multiple places for different local deities. It involves jagar and then the deity goes to different villages and temples, accompanied by large crowds. This festival usually takes place for two days and two nights. Pithoragarh Mahotsav has played a significant role in conserving and sharing Pithoragarh's unique culture. It showcases local culture through music and dance, often featuring performances in the Kumaoni language.

Kandali Festival A flower called Kandali (Strobilanthes wallichii) blooms once every twelve years in the Chaudans region of the Pithoragarh district, and the people celebrate the Kandali festival between August and October. Local people, known as Shaukars or Rangs, take part in the week-long festival in various villages throughout the region. The festival begins with the worship of a Shiva linga made of a flour mixture of barley and buckwheat. During this festival, local liquor is traditionally consumed. It is performed in a decorated corner of the courtyard by each household. People pray for good fortune. The individual Poojas are followed by a community feast. Then women and men in traditional dress and laden with gold and silver ornaments assemble around a tree on the sacred ground of the village. Strips of white cloth are tied to the tree and a flag is raised.

Hilljatra is a pastoralists' and agriculturalists' festival, which is celebrated in some parts of the Pithoragarh district. The Aathon (the eighth day of bhado) and Gawra Visarjan became part of Hilljatra during the development process. The festival, which originated in West Nepal's Sorar (Mahakali) region, was first introduced to the valley in Kumor village, Pithoragarh. The hiljatra of Urai (Dewalthal) is the most famous. The tableau of the Lakhiya bhoot is the main attraction. On the evening of hiljatra, the goddess Mahakali is worshipped, and tableaux are taken out. The people of Bajethi, another village near Pithoragarh, accepted the Jatra, and it was modified and introduced as Hiran chital in the Kanalichhina and Askot regions. Hilljatra is linked to ropai (paddy planting) and other rainy-season agricultural and pastoral labours (Hill = mud, Jatra = Jaat). It has also been linked to the Champawat ruler's victory.

=== In popular culture ===
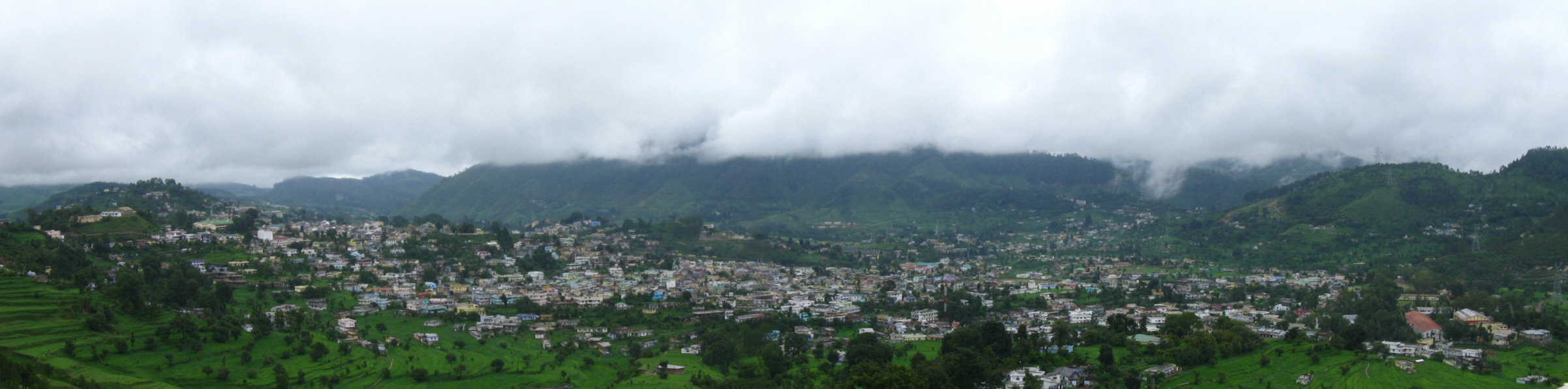
A panoramic view of Pithoragarh

The town was extensively described in a novel by American author Bradley Swift, From Pithoragarh to Pittsburg. Major parts of the Bollywood film Sandeep Aur Pinky Faraar were shot in the city.

=== Legacy ===
The region retains a strong association with the historic Chand dynasty, which ruled Kumaon for several centuries. According to published sources, Kapil Chand is regarded as a contemporary descendant of the Chand royal lineage and is associated with preserving the family's heritage.

=== Social customs ===
Women play a highly active role in the local economy, agriculture, and community leadership. While traditional gender roles exist, the level of women's mobility, safety, and access to education is far more advanced than in many other North Indian regions.

== Transport ==
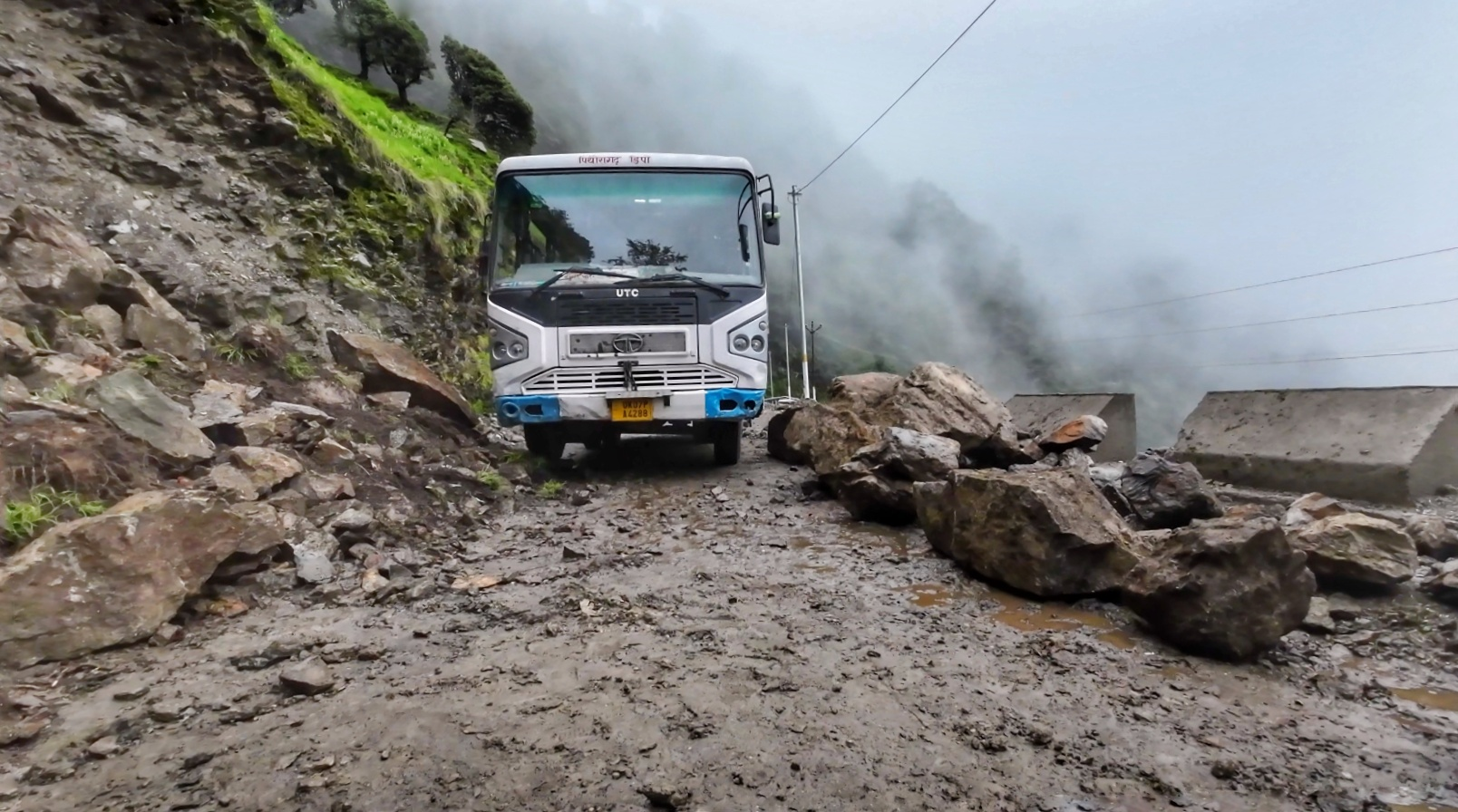
Landslides and cloudbursts, caused by heavy rains that fall during the summer monsoon, often interrupt transportation networks.

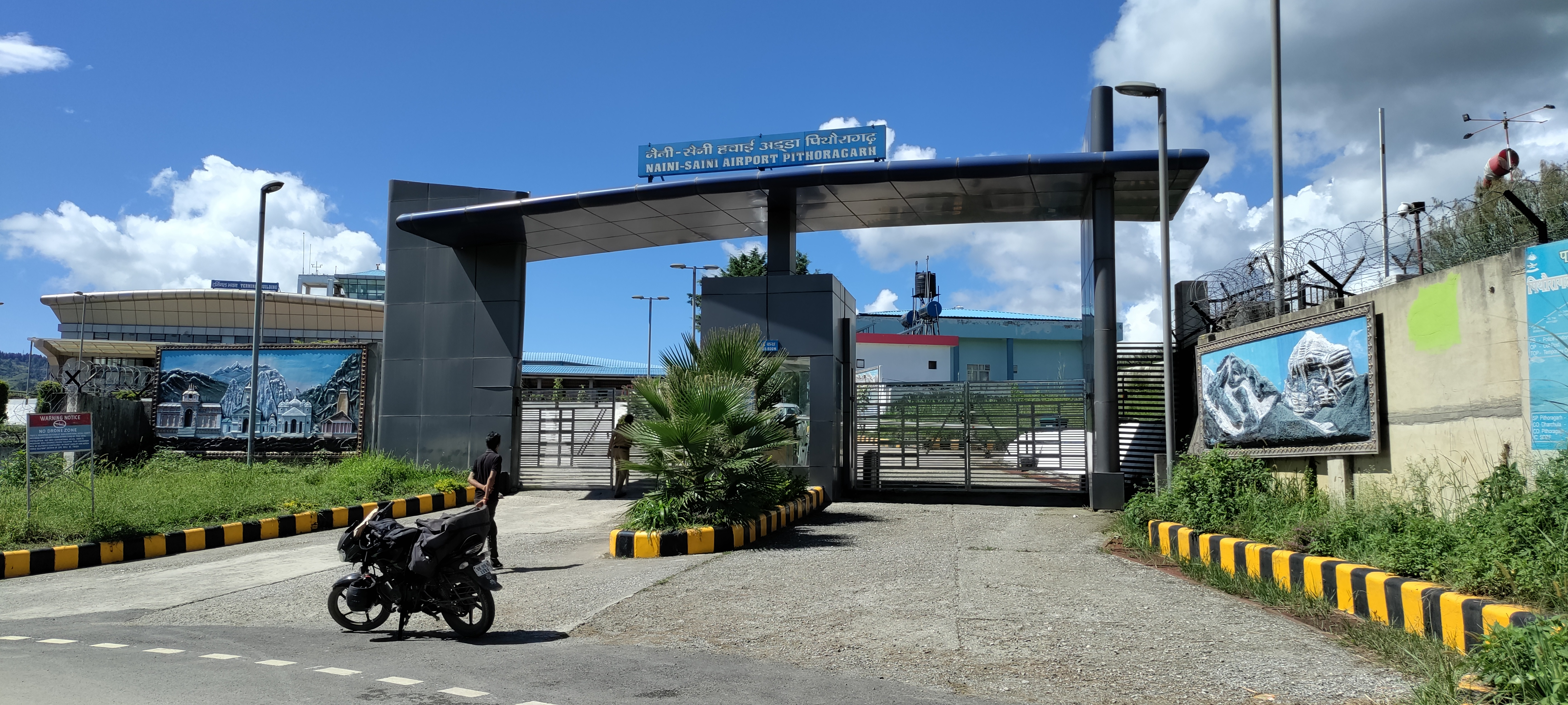
Naini Saini Airport

Pithoragarh is not connected by any direct train services; however, it is well connected by road, and it also has an airport. The National Highway 9 passes through Pithoragarh. Landslides and cloudbursts, caused by heavy rains that fall during the summer monsoon, often interrupt transportation networks.

The Pithoragarh Airport, also known as the Naini Saini Airport, is located about 5 kilometres (3.1 mi) north-east of the city. The airport, which was constructed in 1991 for administrative use, was previously mainly used by the Indian Air Force for defence purposes. The airport was upgraded in 2016 at an estimated cost of ₹64.91 crore.

Bareilly Airport is located around 249 km from Pithoragarh and is a major airport connected to cities like Mumbai, New Delhi and Bengaluru.

Pithoragarh is connected to the rest of Uttarakhand by all-weather motorable roads. The total road length in Pithoragarh is 80 km. Haldwani and Tanakpur are two entry points for entering Pithoragarh by road. Both are connected by railway services, the nearest railway stations being Tanakpur (151 km) and Kathgodam (212 km). Regular state bus transport services along with private taxi services are available at both places. Buses, which are the most commonly used mode of transport, are run by government agencies and private operators. The Pithoragarh bus depot serves as a key hub for agencies operating long-distance bus services, including the Uttarakhand Transport Corporation, K.M.O.U, and various private operators.

== Education ==
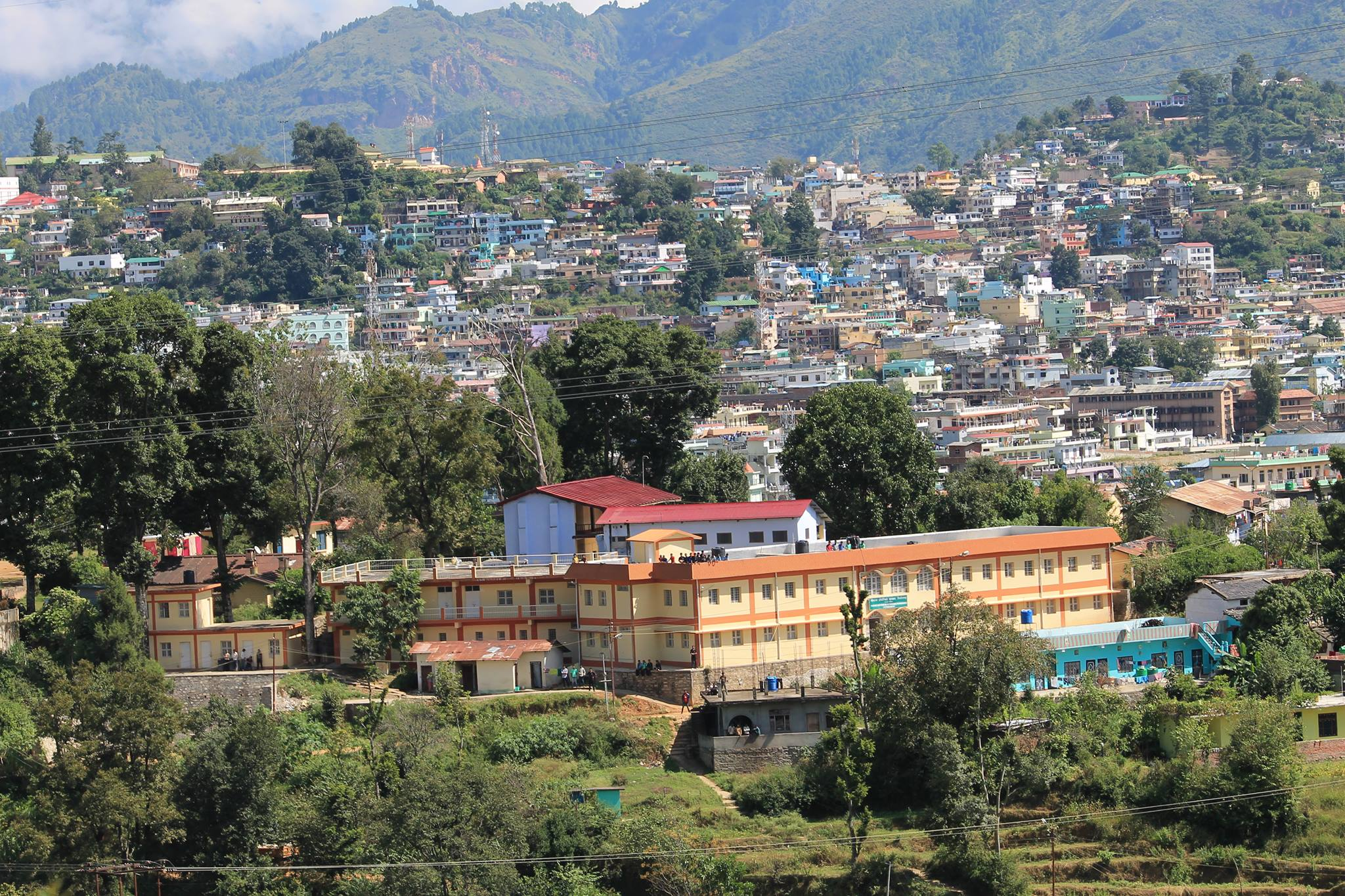
Temporary campus of Seemant Institute of Technology

Schools in Pithoragarh are run by the state government or private organisations. Hindi and English are the primary languages of instruction. Schools in Pithoragarh follow the "10+2+3" plan.

After completing their secondary education, students typically enrol in Inter Colleges that have a higher secondary facility and are affiliated with the Central Board of Secondary Education, CISCE or the Department of Education of the Government of Uttarakhand. They usually choose a focus on liberal arts, business, or science. The town has a literacy rate of 92.48% as of 2011 census, which is one of the highest in the country.

As of 2011, Pithoragarh had 17 primary schools, 20 middle schools, 22 secondary schools, 14 senior secondary schools, and 1 degree college. Before independence, during the middle of the 19th century when Pithoragarh was part of Almora, there were only two middle schools in Pithoragarh.

LSM Govt. Post Graduate College is the only government college in the town providing studies up to post-graduation. It was previously affiliated to Kumaun University, Nainital. With the growing impact of I.T., the government opened an engineering college, SIT Pithoragarh, in 2011. Almost a dozen privately owned computer centres opened up later in the town. A few of the IT centres which are in Pithoragarh town are NIIT, Hiltron, Aptech, UpHill Computers, Info. Park, Sri Calculation and Care Computer.

Construction of a government medical college is ongoing near the Mostamanu area by the state government, and it has been allotted a budget of ₹450 crores ($64 million).

== Notable people ==
- Khadg Singh Valdiya
- Vinod Kapri
- Hemant Pandey
- Lucky Bisht
- Unmukt Chand
- Mary Reed
- Laurie Baker
- Dan Singh Bisht
- Mahendra Singh Mahra
