= Baz Bahadur Chand =

Baz Bahadur Chand बाज़ बहादुर चंद
- Maharaja Shri Raja; Bahadur
- Portrait of Maharaja Baz Bahadur Chand

Maharaja of Kumaon
- Reign: 1638 - 1678
- Enthronement: 1638 (Malla Mahal, Almora, Kumaon)
- Predecessor: Trimal Chand
- Successor: Udyot Chand

King Emeritus
- Tenure: 1678 - 1680
- Born: Baz Gusain; 1598 (Estimated); Almora, Kumaon (Present - day Kumaon division, Uttarakhand, India)
- Died: 1680 (aged 82); Malla Mahal, Almora, Kumaon (Present - day Kumaon division, Uttarakhand, India)
- Issue: Udyot Chand; Pahad Singh Gusain
Regnal name
- Baz Bahadur Chand
- Dynasty: Chand Dynasty
- Father: Nila Gusain
- Religion: Hindusim
- Personal Royal Seal
- Military career
- Allegiance: Mughal Empire
- Branch: Mughal Army
- Service years: 1654 - 1655
- Rank: Auxiliary Commander
- Conflicts: Battle of Garhwal
- Awards: Robe of honor, Title of Bahadur

Baz Bahadur Chand (Kumaoni: बाज़ बहादुर चंद; 1598 - 1680), born Baz Gusain (बाज़ गुसाईं), was the 50th Maharaja of the Chand Dynasty of Kumaon. He ascended to the throne in 1638 after the death of his adoptive father, the previous Maharaja Trimal Chand. Under his reign the Kingdom of Kumaon grew considerably in influence, territory, power and wealth. His rule lasted 40 years until he abdicated due to his age and declining physical and mental health. He died at the age of 82 in 1680.

Maharaja Baz Bahadur Chand is considered to be one of the greatest kings of Kumaon. During his reign Kumaon reestablished authority over Terai, subjugated Doti, invaded Tibetan territory, successfully repelled Mughal aggression and undermined the Kingdom of Garhwal. He introduced new court customs inspired by Muslim durbars and further institutionalized the government. He also wiped out the remaining descendants of the Katyuri Dyansty for siding with Garhwal. The reign of Baz Bahadur Chand is seen as the Golden Age of Kumaon.

== Early life ==
Baz Bahadur Chand was born to Prince Nila Gusain in Almora. At that time Kumaon was ruled by Maharaja Vijay Chand, who was a puppet ruler under the trio of nobles Sukhram Karki, Piru Gusain and Vinayak Bhatt. When Prince Nila Gusain raised objected to the Kings confinement within his harem and his powerlessness, his eyes were pulled out, and he later died. All the other Gusains (Elder Princes) and Rautelas (Younger Princes) were killed by the trio to eliminate competition. Only two sons of former Maharaja Laxmi Chand survived - Prince Trimal Chand (Future King) and Prince Narayan Chand. Out of them the former fled to Garhwal and the second to Doti.

A royal maid servant wrapping in a piece of cloth blind Nila Gusain's son, nicknamed 'Baja Baja', entrusted him to the wife of her family priest Dharmakar Tewari of Chausar. She kept him concealed with her. There he was brought up as a non - royal.

== Crown Prince ==
After Vijay Chand was killed by the trio of nobles, the Mahar faction made Trimal Chand the Maharaja after bringing him back from Garhwal. Once enthroned, Maharaja Trimal Chand took swift action and punished the three nobles.

During his reign, Trimal Chand faced a succession crisis as he had no son. Many members of the Chand dynasty had either perished in the violent conflicts during Vijay Chand's time or had fled. Determined to find a suitable heir, Trimal Chand began searching for a successor.

He was informed that Baz Gusain, the son of Nila Gusain, had been raised by the wife of Sri Dharmakar Tewari. When men were sent to retrieve the boy, Tewari's wife, suspicious of the Maharaja's intentions, denied that he was in her home.

Trimal Chand then personally visited her. She demanded that he swear an oath ensuring the boy's safety and confirming his appointment as prince before she would hand him over. The Maharaja agreed to her conditions, after which she entrusted Baz Gusain to him. Trimal Chand took the boy to the palace and formally declared him the prince.

The appointment of Baz Gusain as prince was celebrated with great pomp. In the royal court, Trimal Chand publicly addressed him as his successor, seated him beside his throne, and said to him, "My son, you will be the king after me." From that moment, Baz Gusain became known as Prince Baj Chand and began attending court to learn the administration of the kingdom.

== Reign ==
=== Enthronement ===
Prince Baj Chand became the Maharaja of Kumaon in 1638 after the death of Maharaja Trimal Chand.

=== Recapturing Terai ===
The area of Terai Bhavar was highly prosperous. But since the time of Maharaja Laxmi Chand, the Chands were engaged in domestic quarrels, so they could not pay attention to Terai. There the Hindu chiefs of Kather had grabbed major part of their kingdom.

==== Meeting with Shah Jahan ====
Baz Chand went to the court of Mughal Emperor Shahjahan to lodge a complaint against this. He took with him a large number of presents. He presented those gifts to the emperor. The Emperor told him that the Maharaja should support him in his war against Garhwal, and when they will win the region of Terai would be given to him. In 1654-55 A.D. the army was sent to Garhwal. He also was sent there. In the battle of Garhwal he showed his valiance for which the title of Bahadur was granted to him. A Robe of honour studded with jewels was also given to him.

==== Restablishment of Authority ====
He got a firman in which he was called the zamindar of Terai. Subedar Nawab Rustam Khan helped Maharaja Baz Bahadur Chand and again the Terai came under the authority of Kumaon. Nawab Khalilullah Khan also helped him. Rustam Khan came to the region of Kathed and read out the order of the emperor to the Kathedias. He disbanded their army and thus full authority of king Baz Bahadur Chand was re-established in Terai.

Maharaja Baz Bahadur Chand appointed Karindas (agents) in Terai and also founded a town named Bazpur.

=== Conflict against Aurangzeb ===
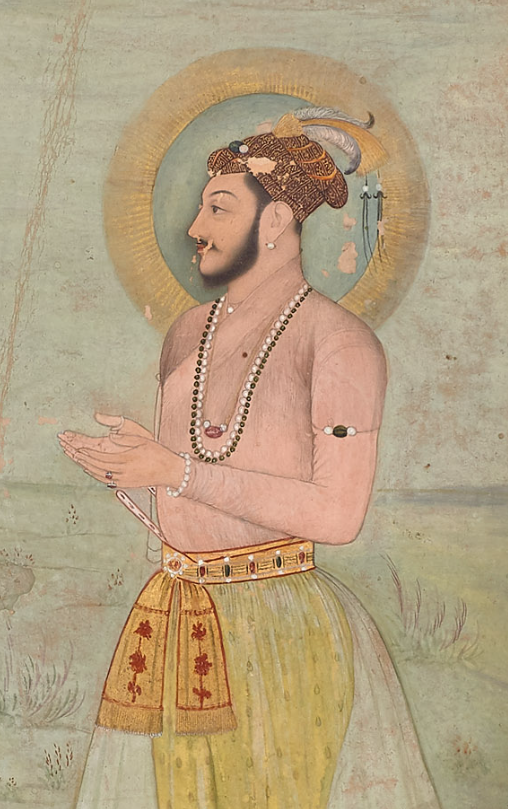
Prince Sulaiman Shikoh

When Aurangzeb decided to ascend the throne after killing his brothers, prince Sulaiman Sikoh, son of Dara Shikoh, fled to Kumaon and begged for shelter from Baz Bahadur Chand. The Maharaja first warmly entertained him but later on finding him against the Emperor gave him many presents and wealth and sent him to Garhwal. Aurangzeb at once sent his army and threatened the Maharaja of Kumaon that if he did not surrender prince Sulaiman to him, the whole of Terai would be seized and Kumaon desolated.

While Baz Bahadur Chand was in the Terai region, he commanded his night guard, Hedi, to stealthily enter the sleeping chamber of the Muslim commander and steal his shawl, dagger, and turban. These items were then sent to the Mughal Emperor along with a letter in which the Maharaja stated that, had he wished, he could have killed the imperial commander but refrained from doing so since the prince was not present with him.

Around this time, Prince Sulaiman was captured, prompting the Mughal army to retreat from Terai. The Mughal Sardar informed Emperor Aurangzeb that the Maharaja of Kumaon was truthful and had not provided shelter to the prince. Pleased with this assurance, Baz Bahadur Chand later dispatched Prince Pahad Singh Gusain and Pandit Vishvarup Pandey Rajguru as his ambassadors to the Mughal court in Delhi. In response, Aurangzeb granted a firman confirming the Maharaja's authority over Terai and honored him with a robe of honour.

=== Second conflict against Aurangzeb ===
In 1665 the Mughal army was sent to Kumaon against Maharaja Baz Bahadur Chand. The army of emperor Aurangzeb captured Terai and the emperor's rule was established there (October. 1665), but it was not an easy job to have control over mountains. In May 1666 one lakh rupees and 200 stone cutters were sent to help the army. The Raja of Garhwal backed the Mughals against Kumaon but his nephew who had matrimonial relation in the royal family of Kumaon, backed the Maharaja of Kumaon.

In a letter addressed to the Vazīr-e Azam of the Mughal Empire during that time, Baz Bahadur Chand accused the Raja of Garhwal for lodging a false complaint against him in the court of emperor Aurangzeb, falsely stating that he possessed huge wealth, so much gold that would not be available even on conducting searches all over the mountains. Baz Bahadur Chand then said that Raja of Garhwal should prove the authenticity of his statement. He then continued, saying that in regard to invading Srinagar (capital of Garhwal) without permission from the Mughal court, he is ready to pay a fine for it.

In October. 1673 the Maharaja was granted pardon and he sent his prince to the imperial court.

=== Management of Terai ===
The Maharaja greatly loved Terai Bhavar. He always toured that region. He appointed officers there. They were ordered to live at Bazpur and Rudrapur in winter. In summers the officers shifted to Kota and Badakheda. Each and every bigha of land was then under cultivation. Kota was the main capital of Terai Bhavar. The Kumaoni Governor of Terai Bhavar lived there. Some Muslim sardars and the army also was posted there and their commission was fixed. Among the Muslims some who belonged to Hedi and Mewat were allotted the duties of watchmen of Bhavar.

=== Introducing new court customs ===
Upon his return to Almora, Baz Bahadur Chand introduced several customs inspired by the traditions he had observed in Muslim courts and the courts of other rulers. He established naubat (kettle drums) and nakkarchikhanas (designated areas for drummers to perform). Additionally, he appointed bearers of asa (a staff adorned with gold and silver plating) and ballam (a specially crafted mace), along with chopdars (ceremonial guards).

The Maharaja also brought with him a group of mace-bearers, drummers, mirasis (traditional performers), clowns, and mimes from the plains to enhance the grandeur of his court. Furthermore, a Brahmin confectioner was employed to prepare sweets for the royal palace.

=== Views on Jizya ===
Baz Bahadur Chand was against Jizya tax being implemented on Mughal associated states like Kumaon. According to Raja Anand Singh, a descendant of the Chand dynasty and Indian freedom fighter, an application from Kumaon was sent that this tax should not be levied.

=== Installation of Nanda Devi ===
Baz Bahadur Chand invaded Garhwall and from there brought Nandadevi along with all her attendants and installed her in Malla Mahal, Almora. Royal maid servants were placed there for the service.

Later on George William Traill, second commissioner of Kumaon, shifted and installed her at the present place.

=== Invasion of Taklakot (Tibet) ===
Maharaja Baz Bahadur Chand was a man of strong religious convictions. He was shocked to hear the stories of atrocities of the Lamas from the pilgrims to Mansarovar and Kailash. In response the Kumaoni forces invaded Tibet and captured Kailash Manasarovar, a holy site for Hindus and Buddhists, along with several forts.

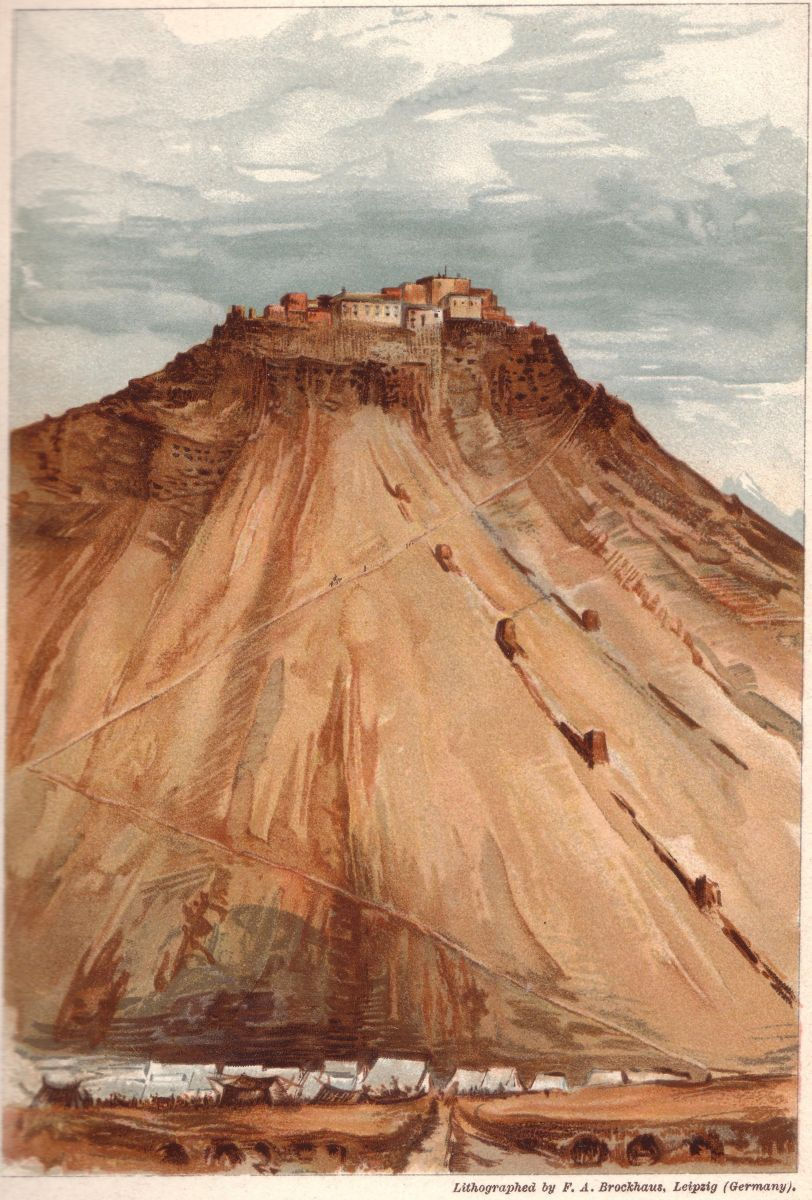
Painting of Taklakot Fort, by Arnold Henry Savage Landor

==== Cause ====
Many pilgrims came to the court of Baz Bahadur Chand to complain about the Huniyas (The area from northwestern Tibet till the borders of Ladakh at that time was known as Hundesh, and Tibetans there were called Huniyas, ཧུ་ནི་ཡ) robbing them on their pilgrimage to Kailash Manasarovar, and committing atrocities. Being quite religious, he could not stand it, and decided to bring an end to this problem.

==== Invasion ====
Baz Bahadur Chand himself led his army through Juhar Pass and entered Tibetan territory, which was then under Khoshut Khanate (ཁོ་ཤུད་ཀན་དེ), a nominal vassal state of the Qing Dynasty. He captured the Fort of Taklakot (ཏེག་ལ་དཀར་རྫོང་) in 1670. It is said that the chasm in it that was made by the royal army still exists in its original form. He also forced the Huniyas there to pay tribute to his Kingdom. This was the first time in history that an Indian king had captured this stronghold of Tibet.

==== Aftermath ====
There was no strong response from the higher Tibetan authority to this intrusion, and although it is not very well documented, civil war and unrest, Mongol conquest and rise of regional warlords in Tibet could be a probable cause.

The Maharaja deprived the Huniyas of their right over the passes of Kailash, and took it in his hands. He also stopped the commission that the Bhotias paid to the Tibetans, but when the Tibetans agreed that in future they would raise no dispute in respect of religion, communication and trade, then he allowed it to continue. With the revenue of the nearby villages, he made an arrangement for food, clothing and lodging of the pilgrims to Kailash Mansarovar.

=== Reconquest attempt by Kingdom of Garhwal ===
Map of India 1765, Garhwal conquered By Baz Bahadur Chand

==== Reconquest attempt and response ====
When Maharaja Baz Bahadur Chand was in Bhot, the Raja of Garhwal collecting an army re-captured the regions formerly conquered by Baz Bahadur Chand. Baz Bahadur Chand taking some commanders and army with him reached Garhwal via Pindari while other commanders went to Lohaba via Ramganga. They drove away the Garhwalis up to Srinagar. In Srinagar, a truce was signed and realising the expenditure incurred on military operations and accepting presents the kingdom of Garhwal was handed back to the Raja of Garhwal.

==== Wiping out descendants of Katyuri Dynasty ====
Pali (Ranikhet and Dwarahat) was conquered in the days of Maharaja Kirti Chand but the Katyuris living there were allowed to live in the Manila fort of Salt. In this battle when the news reached Baz Bahadur Chand that the Katyuris had helped Garhwal, he destroyed that fort and also drove out the Katyuri king from there. In this way the descendants of the family of Katyuris vanished. Salt also was annexed to Kumaon.

=== Rebellion of prince Udyot Chand ===
Some ministers and nobles managed to influence Prince Udyot Chand, successfully inciting him to conspire against his father, Baz Bahadur Chand, in an attempt to seize the throne. Upon learning of this plot, the Maharaja took action by sending Udyot Chand to Gangolihat, across the Saryu River, entrusting him with the administration of regions such as Sor, Sira, Akskot, Darma, and Bhot.

In his book 'History of Kumaon', Shri Badri Dutt Pandey recounts an intriguing exchange between the Maharaja and the prince:

"Udyot Chand wrote from Gangoli an ordinary letter to the king but a white (grey) hair was found in it. The king asked its reason from his courtiers. They said that by sending white hair he wants to convey that he had grown old ; he was yet only a prince, when would he become a king ? Thereupon, the king dictated his reply to this letter and despatched it with a black hair of his head and in it also sent a message that the king had not yet grown old. But to console the prince he went to Gangoli and there affectionately met him and after consoling him returned to Almora."

=== Resignation of Diwan Narottam Joshi ===
To ensure fairness and proper governance, Maharaja Baz Bahadur Chand and his Diwan, Narottam Joshi, agreed that no royal order would be issued without the Maharaja's signature (Royal Seal). The Maharaja would sign a document only if the Diwan deemed it just and fair. To facilitate this process, the Diwan controlled access to the royal pen-stand, keeping its key in his possession. He would take a pen from the stand, fill it with ink, and hand it to the Maharaja for signing. This system was strictly followed.

During the reign of the Chand kings, official copper plates, known as katardar, bore the mark of the ruler's dagger instead of a signature. The king's name was engraved at the beginning, along with the names of chief officers. This practice extended to signing official documents as well.

On one occasion, in the Maharaja's absence, Diwan Narottam Joshi issued a royal order under his own signature for an urgent matter. His opponents took advantage of the situation and influenced the Maharaja, who, in response, ordered that the Diwan's hands be cut off. To prevent this severe punishment, a deputy minister paid a fine of 40,000 Rupees on the Diwan's behalf, leading the Maharaja to pardon him.

A few years later, another critical order required the Maharaja's signature while the Diwan was unavailable. The Diwan's rivals persuaded the Maharaja that he was being treated as a mere figurehead while the Diwan held real power. Enraged, Baz Bahadur Chand broke the royal pen-stand and had the order signed by another officer. When Narottam Joshi returned and discovered what had happened, he resigned from his position. Later, when the Maharaja's anger subsided, he summoned Joshi back, but the Diwan refused, sending a message that if the Maharaja no longer trusted him, he would not serve him again.

=== Later years and cognitive decline ===
Baz Bahadur Chand showed symptoms of cognitive decline and also became paranoid. The once popular and celebrated ruler gained a notorious reputation in his later years.

A Dalakoti Brahmin deceived the Maharaja by suggesting that his failure to regularly test his officers could lead to betrayal. When the Maharaja asked for a way to conduct such a test, the Brahmin proposed a method: he would place two heaps of rice—one containing good rice and the other containing bad rice. By touching either heap, he claimed he could determine which officers and courtiers were loyal and which were not. Since Baz Bahadur Chand has developed paranoia and other mental issues in his old age, he believed him. Following this advice, the Maharaja ordered his servants and courtiers to participate in the test. Based on the Brahmin's judgments, many individuals were deemed disloyal and subsequently executed.

Whomsoever the Dalakoti Brahmin wanted to be killed, he declared him bad on the ground that he had touched the heap of rice. In this way on the advice of the Brahmin the Maharaja got hundreds of his men killed. Eyes of many more were pulled out. Since then, the Kumaoni proverb goes "वर्ष भया अस्सी, बुद्धि गई नस्सी " (When one becomes eighty years old, his wisdom is destroyed).

Sri Sundar Bhandari, a trusted attendant from the village of Bajel in Almora, was a favorite of Maharaja Baz Bahadur Chand. One day, he warned the Maharaja that he had been misled by the Dalakoti Brahmin and had unjustly executed many individuals, causing discontent among his officers. The Maharaja, however, insisted that he never ordered executions without proper inquiry and believed the rice test to be a fair method of judgment.

To challenge this belief, Sundar Bhandari set up two heaps of rice and told the Maharaja that one heap would signify that he considered the ruler bad, while the other would indicate he saw him as good. By chance, Sundar Bhandari touched the heap containing bad rice. This unexpected turn of events made the Maharaja realize the flaws in the test. Acknowledging his mistake, he punished Dalakoti and admitted that he had committed a grave injustice. As a gesture of remorse, he provided financial support to the families of those who had been executed. Despite this, people remained fearful of approaching him.

It is said that Maharaja Baz Bahadur Chand was greatly hurt by this sin.

== Abdication ==
Due to his declining physical and mental health, Maharaja Baz Bahadur Chand abdicated in favour of prince Udyot Chand in 1678, at the age of 80.

On the abdication of Maharaja Baz Bahadur Chand, the next Maharaja Udyot Chand was summoned from Gangoli and ascended the throne unopposed. The abdication was reportedly met with popular support due to Baz Bahadur Chand's declining mental state and a recent array of executions.

== Death ==
The period of the rule of Maharaj Baz Bahadur Chand was very glorious. He extended the empire and brought in a number of new reforms and further institutionalized the government. But his last days were very bad. He mental status declined continuously and he developed paranoia. He was always suspicious that his courtiers and sons might kill him at any moment. He dismissed all his old servants under the fear that someone might kill him.

In 1680 he died a very painful death in Almora. None cared for him.

== Legacy ==
Maharaja Baz Bahadur Chand is regarded as one of the most influential and powerful rulers in Kumaon's history as well as in the history of the Himalayan regions. His dedication to good governance made him a popular figure of his time. His acts of kindness and charity were probably influenced by his humble and non - royal childhood. He was well respected by his subjects and honoured by his descendants as well, even though the atrocities he committed in his old age due to his paranoia and other mental issues he later developed were well known. His courage to stand against the Mughal emperor Aurangzeb as well as his willingness to venture out into unknown Tibetan territory to protect pilgrims is often perceived and acclaimed as the true qualities of a monarch. His reign saw the Golden Age of Kumaon, where culture, religion and civilization bloomed, which continued during the reign of his son Maharaja Udyot Chand.

=== Respect for Foster family ===
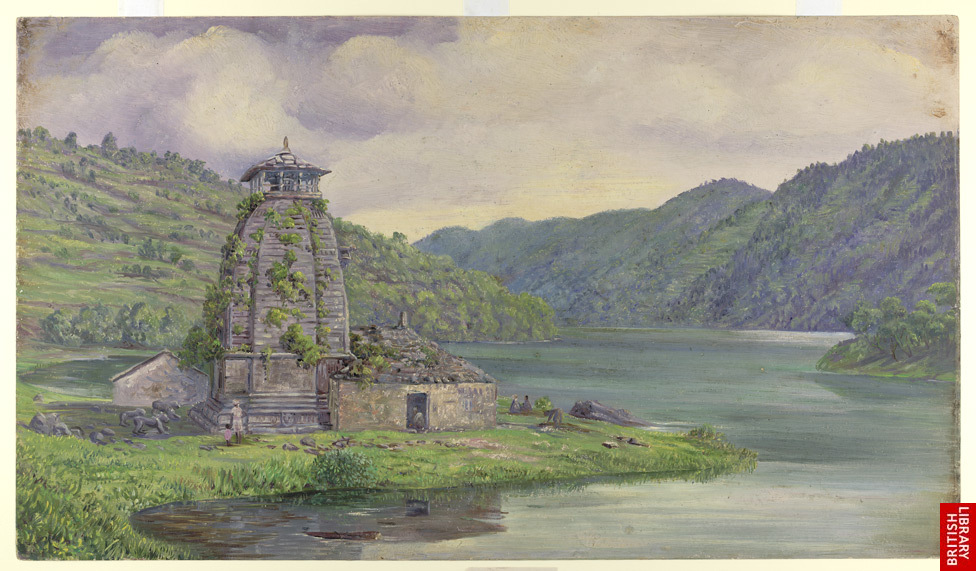
Bhimeswar Temple in Bhimtal lying in a desolated condition in 1878. This painting was made by Marianne North.

The name of the son of the Tewari Brahmani (female brahmin), who had brought up the orphaned Baz Chand in Chausar and had nursed him during his childhood, was Narayan Tewari. Baz Bahadur Chand summoned him to his palace and addressing him as his elder brother asked him to come in and be seated. Maharaja Baz Chand asked him what he should gift him. Narayan Tewari replied that Tewari brahmins should be in the same hierarchy of brahmins in which Guru, Purohit, Pant and Pandey are. The Maharaja accepted it and ordered his officers that on the occasions when brahmin, Guru and Purohit class are invited, Pt. Narayan Tewari also be invited along with them.

The memorial of that honest and pious Brahmin still exists. The Tyadi ka naula which lies near Chausar was also built after his name.

=== Religiosity ===
Maharaja Baz Bahadur Chand was deeply religious. He promoted religious studies and gave respect to educated scholars and Brahmins in his kingdom.

He did many acts of charity. He performed many religious sacrifices in Bageshwar. Recitation, penances and sacrifices were regularly performed. In Bhimtal he constructed the temple of Bhimeshvar Mahadev. He built a number of temples all over Kumaon. He inlaid the temple of Jageshwar with plates of copper. He built many more temples and naulas (ground water springs). Lakhs of rupees were spent over them.

== Functionaries ==
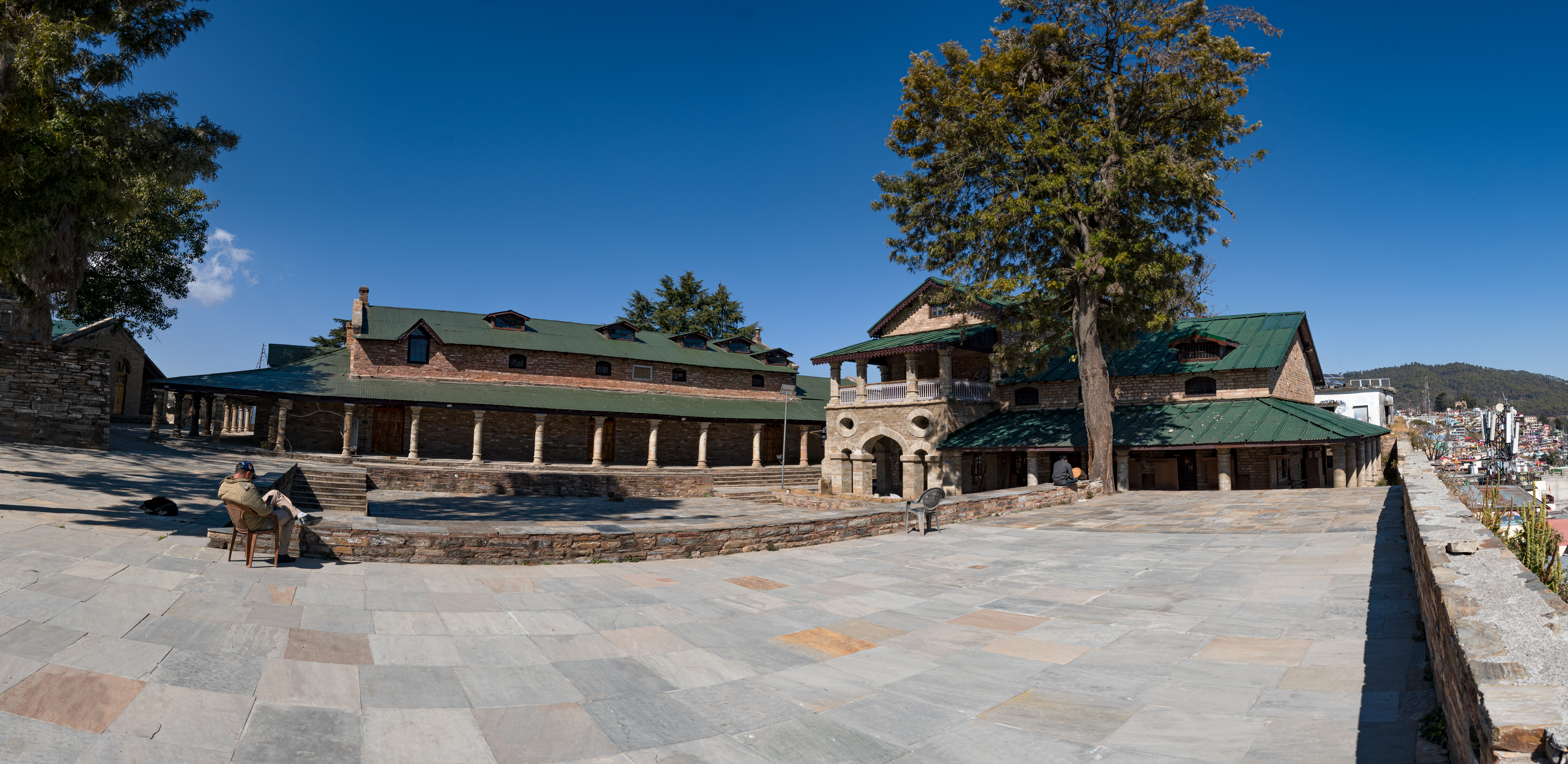
Malla Mahal was the seat of the Maharaja and the royal court.

During the reign of Maharaja Baz Bahadur Chand the following people held important posts in the royal durbar (court) -

Pt. Srinivas Pandey was the rajguru (High Priest) and Pt. Rudradev Pandey was the purohit of Baz Bahadur Chand.

Sri Narottam Joshi was the Diwan (Prime Minister) of Kumaon. Sri Bhavdev Joshi and Sri Sudarshan Upreti were the ministers.

Sri Vishvarup Pandey, Sri Vinayak Adhikari, Sri Vikramark Gusain, Sri Pratapaditya Gusain, Sri Arjun Singh Gusain were commanders of the army and courtiers.

Great scholars adorned the royal court. The science of astrology was greatly progressing. Pt. Hiramani Joshi of Mala, Pt. Ramapati of Sarp, Pt. Manorath Joshi of Bherang were the chief astrologers of the royal court. Almanacs and a number of astrological works were composed during Baz Bahadur Chand's reign.

== Issue ==
- Maharaja Udyot Chand, the eldest son of Maharaja Baz Bahadur Chand
- Prince Pahad Singh Gusain, the second son of Baz Bahadur Chand
- The third prince, about him not anything is known since he left everything to become a hermit

== In popular culture ==
A theatrical show revolving around the life of Maharaja Baz Bahadur Chand was performed in Delhi by 'Divya Diksha- Centre for Performing Arts' on July, 2018.

== See also ==
- Kingdom of Kumaon
- Kumaon division
- Chand Dynasty
