= Tegla Kar =

Fort in Burang County, Tibet

- ཏེག་ལ་དཀར་རྫོང་
- Burang County, Ngari Prefecture, Tibet, China
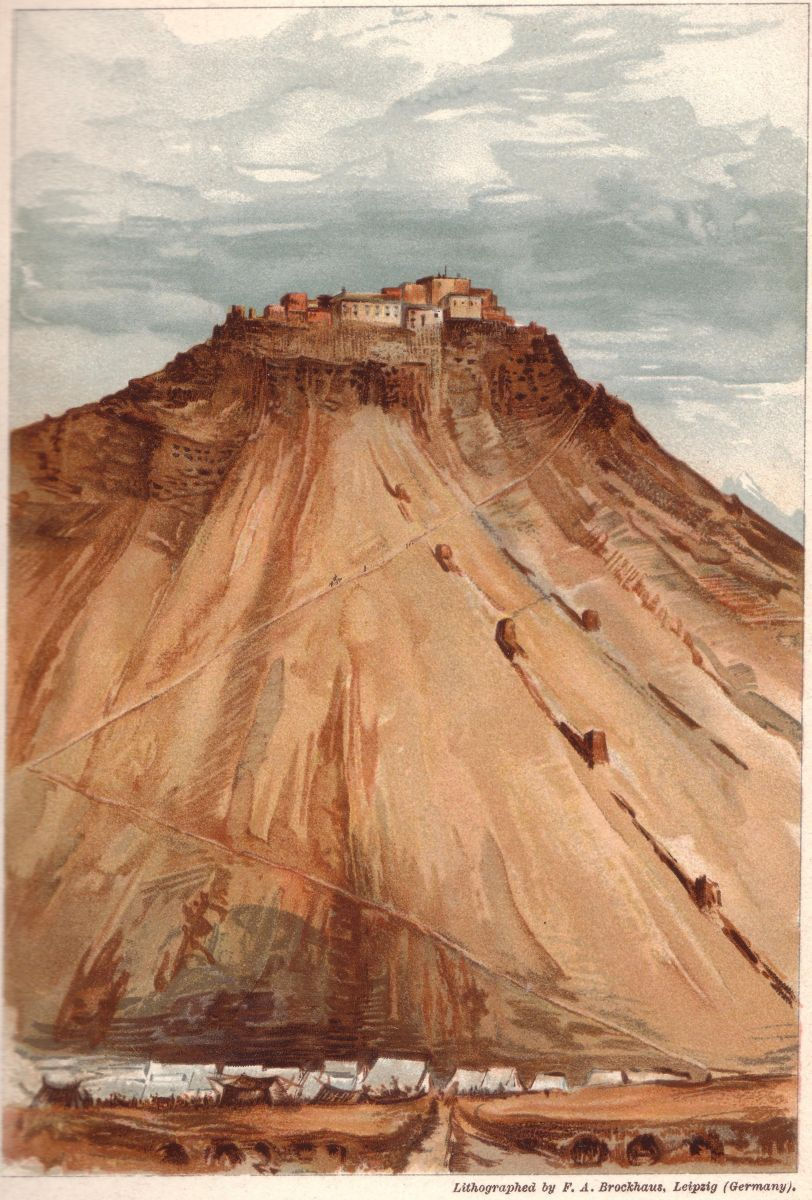
- Painting of Taklakot Fort, by Arnold Henry Savage Landor

Site information
- Type: Fortress
- Condition: Destroyed

Location
- Location within Tibet
- Coordinates: 30°17′34″N 81°10′34″E

Site history
- Demolished: 1967

The Tegla Kar Dzong (Tibetan: ཏེག་ལ་དཀར་རྫོང་) was a fort located on a cliff above the town of Burang (also called Taklakot) in Burang County, southwestern Tibet near the Nepalese border. It seems that the Tegla Kar was built during the Zhangzhung period which was conquered by the Tibetan King Songtsen Gampo in the beginning of 7th century. It became the main fort of the kingdom of Burang in the 10th century during the reign of King Kori. The kingdom disappeared during the 15th century. After the decline of the kingdom the Dzong was converted into a convent.

Due to the atrocities committed against the pilgrims to Mansarovar and Kailash by the Tibetans, Maharaja Baz Bahadur Chand King of Kumaon conquered the fort in 1670. The Maharaja deprived the Tibetans of their right over the passes of Kailash, and took it in his hands. He also stopped the commission that the Bhotias paid to the Tibetans, but when the Tibetans agreed that in future they would raise no dispute in respect of religion, communication and trade, then he allowed it to continue.

Tegla Kar and the nearby Simbiling Monastery was completely destroyed by artillery in 1967 during the Chinese Cultural Revolution.
