= Harshdeo Joshi =

De facto ruler and chief diplomat of Kumaon Kingdom
- Preceded by: Mohan Chand (as king)
- Succeeded by: Shiv Chand (nominal)

Personal details
- Born: Kumaon
- Died: Unknown Possibly Bareilly or Tarai, during exile
- Known for: Political leadership during the Chand dynasty succession crises

Military service
- Allegiance: Kumaon Kingdom
- Battles/wars: Conflicts with Garhwal, Pradyumn Chand, Mohan Chand, Lal Singh

Harshdeo Joshi was a prominent 18th-century Kumaoni statesman, diplomat, and military strategist during the decline of the Chand dynasty in the Kumaon Kingdom. Known for his intelligence and political maneuvering, Joshi played a decisive role in the succession disputes and administration of Kumaon.

== Early career ==
Very little is known about Harshdeo Joshi's early life, but he rose to prominence as a trusted advisor and strategist during the reign of King Mohan Chand. He gained a reputation for being a shrewd diplomat and was soon involved in high-level political decisions involving both the Garhwal Kingdom and internal affairs of Kumaon.

== Deposition of Mohan Chand ==
Harshdeo aligned with Jaikirti Shah of Garhwal and corresponded on matters of legitimacy between the two kingdoms. Though Jaikirti Shah remained suspicious of Harshdeo’s motives, military action followed. Kumaoni forces, under Joshi’s guidance, successfully repelled the Garhwali attack, resulting in the death of Jaikirti Shah in the forest—either in battle or by alleged assassination under Joshi’s orders.

This victory enabled a brutal sack of Srinagar, Garhwal, including the looting of the Devalgarh temple. The looting was known as Joshyanaan and was blamed on Harshdeo Joshi and his allies, the Joshis.

== Rise to Power ==
Following the chaos, Joshi emerged as the most powerful figure in Kumaon. Despite not crowning himself king, he installed puppet rulers from the Chand dynasty, such as Shiv Chand (also called Shiv Singh). The administration was entirely in the hands of the Joshis during this time.

== Conflicts and Exile ==
Harshdeo faced opposition from multiple rivals: Prince Lal Singh, King Pradyumn Chand, and later Parakram Shah. At various times he fled to Garhwal, Bareilly, and even sought help from the Nawab of Awadh. He was pursued by enemies and even detained in Bareilly under orders from local authorities.

He later corresponded with the Kingdom of Nepal, receiving a red-sealed firman from Ranbahadur Singh offering support if Harshdeo joined the Gorkha army against Kumaon. His efforts to regain control ultimately failed.

== Death and legacy ==
The exact circumstances of Harshdeo Joshi’s death remain unclear. He likely died in exile. Despite his controversial methods—marked by conspiracies, plundering, and imprisonment of rival kings—he is remembered as one of the most influential and cunning political figures in Kumaoni history.

== See also ==
- Kumaon Kingdom
- Chand dynasty
