= Kingdom of Kumaon =

Himalayan kingdom (600–1791)

Coordinates: 29.5971°N 79.6591°E

Kingdom of Kumaon कुमाऊं राज्य (Kumaoni)
- 600–1791
- Flag
- Status: Governorate (Kingdom of Nepal {1791–1816}); Province (British India {1816–1947})
- Capital: Baijnath (600–1200); Champawat (1200–1563); Almora (1563–1791)
- Common languages: Kumaoni (Court and Common use); Sanskrit (Religious and Educational)
- Ethnic groups: Kumaonis (Major); Nepalis (In Doti); Bhotiyas
- Religion: State religion: Hinduism Other: Buddhism; Islam
- Demonym: Kumaoni
- Government: Federal Aristocracy under an Absolute monarchy influenced by Political Factions or Occasionally an Oligarchy with a Monarchial Figurehead
- Maharaja
  - 600: Vasu Dev(First {Katyuri dynasty}
  - 1064–1065: Bir Dev (Last {Katyuri dynasty}
  - 700–721: Som Chand (First {Chand dynasty} as Feudatory)
  - 1450–1488: Ratna Chand (36th {Chand dynasty}, First of united Kumaon)
  - 1638–1678: Baz Bahadur Chand
  - 1788–1791: Mahendra Chand (Last)
- Diwan
  - 700–721: Joshi Sudhanidhi Chaube (First {Chand dynasty})
  - 1788–1791: Lal Singh (Last)
- Legislature: Char Burha of Kumaon (Powerful Privy council)
  - Upper house: Malladhara (Mahar Faction)
  - Lower house: Talladhara (Phartyal Faction)
- History
  - Established: 600
  - Fall of Katyuri dynasty: 11th Century
  - Period of fragmentation: 12th century–15th century
  - Reunification of Kumaon by Chand dynasty: 1450
  - Invaded by Kingdom of Nepal: 1791

Area
  - Total: 72,000 km^{2} (28,000 sq mi)(Approx. area during peak of Chand dynasty)

Population
  - Estimate: 500,000
- Currency: Rupee, Paisa
Preceded by	Succeeded by
Kuninda kingdom	Kingdom of Nepal
- Today part of: Uttarakhand, India; Tibet, China; Sudurpashchim Province, Nepal

The Kingdom of Kumaon (English: /kuˈmaʊn/ koo-MAUWN; Kumaoni: कुमाऊं राज्य; Tibetan: ཀུ་མའོ་རྒྱལ་ཕྲན།; HT: Kumāū̃; [kʊˈmä.ʊ̃], also anglicised as Kemaon), also known as Kurmanchal (कूर्मांचल), was a Himalayan kingdom that existed for nearly 1,200 years. The kingdom was established by Vasu Dev of the Katyuri dynasty in the 7th century after he unified many small principalities. After the fall of the Katyuris in the 11th century and about three centuries of fragmentation, the Chand dynasty managed to reunify Kumaon in the middle of the 15th century. They shifted the capital from Kartikeyapura (Baijnath) to Champawat in the 12th century, and finally to Almora in 1563. During their rule, Kumaon was spread sovereign from the river Tons to the river Karnali. The Kingdom of Kumaon had also accepted the suzerainty of the Mughal Empire and paid tribute to them as the writings of Abul Fazl state that from the reign of Rudra Chand onwards, Kumaon began to send gifts and was obedient to the Emperor in Delhi.

During the five-hundred-year Katyuri rule, Kumaoni culture began to form, with Shaivism as the dominant belief. Notable temples like those in Jageshwar and Katarmal were built, and Sanskrit and Pali were widely used. The administration was efficient, with well-built roads and bridges. After the Katyuris' decline, Kurmanchal fragmented into petty kingdoms. The Chand dynasty, present in Kumaon since the 8th century, unified the region, including Doti, in the 15th century. During their seven-hundred-year rule (four hundred years over united Kumaon), folk Hinduism flourished, and Kumaoni gained prominence while Sanskrit was reserved for religion and education. A party system government existed, and for a century, Kumaon thrived as a hub for trade, religion, and learning. Culture bloomed and Kumaon saw a century of Golden Age. However, political instability and financial crises weakened the kingdom by the 18th century, leading to its annexation by the newly unified Kingdom of Nepal in 1791. After twenty-four years of Nepalese rule, the British East Indian Company and later the British Crown took control.

The Katyuris and the Chands left a substantial legacy to modern-day Uttarakhand. Much of the Kumaoni culture, societal norms, and folk traditions, along with the Kumaoni language, derive from the practices and traditions of the Katyuris and the Chands.

== Etymology ==
Kumaon is believed to have been derived from Kurmanchal, meaning land of the Kurma Avatar (the tortoise incarnation of Lord Vishnu, the preserver according to Hinduism). The region of Kumaon is named after as such.

During the time of the British control of the region, between 1815 and 1857 it was also anglicised as Kemaon.

== History ==
=== Katyuri dynasty ===
==== Establishment ====
Around 700 CE, the Katyuri dynasty was established by Vasu Dev in the region. They called their state Kurmanchal, the land of Kurma, the second avatar of Vishnu, from which the present name is derived. Their capital was Kartikeyapura (modern day-Baijnath) and the Gomati Valley came to be known as the Katyur Valley after the ruling dynasty. During their reign they dominated lands of varying extent from the Katyur Valley (modern-day Baijnath) in Kumaon, between the 7th and 11th centuries C.E., and established their capital at Baijnath in Bageshwar district; which was then known as Kartikeyapura and lies in the centre of Katyur Valley. Brahmadev Mandi (a trading and business centre in a flat area of the then Katyuri dynasty) in the Kanchanpur District of Nepal was established by Katyuri king Brahma Dev. Brahmadev Mandi still exists by this name.

==== Peak ====
During the peak of the Katyuri dynasty, the sovereigns were bestowed the title of Giriraj Chakrachudamani, and the 16 monarchs who ruled during that time were known as Chakravarti or Emperors.

==== Downfall ====
It is believed that from King Dhan Dev and Vir Dev, the downfall of this powerful dynasty began. Vir Dev used to collect heavy taxes and forced his people to work as his slaves. King Vir Dev teased his subjects and also he forcibly married his own maternal aunt Tila (Tilottama Devi). It is said that the Kumaoni folk song 'Mami Tile Dharo Bola' became popular from that very day.

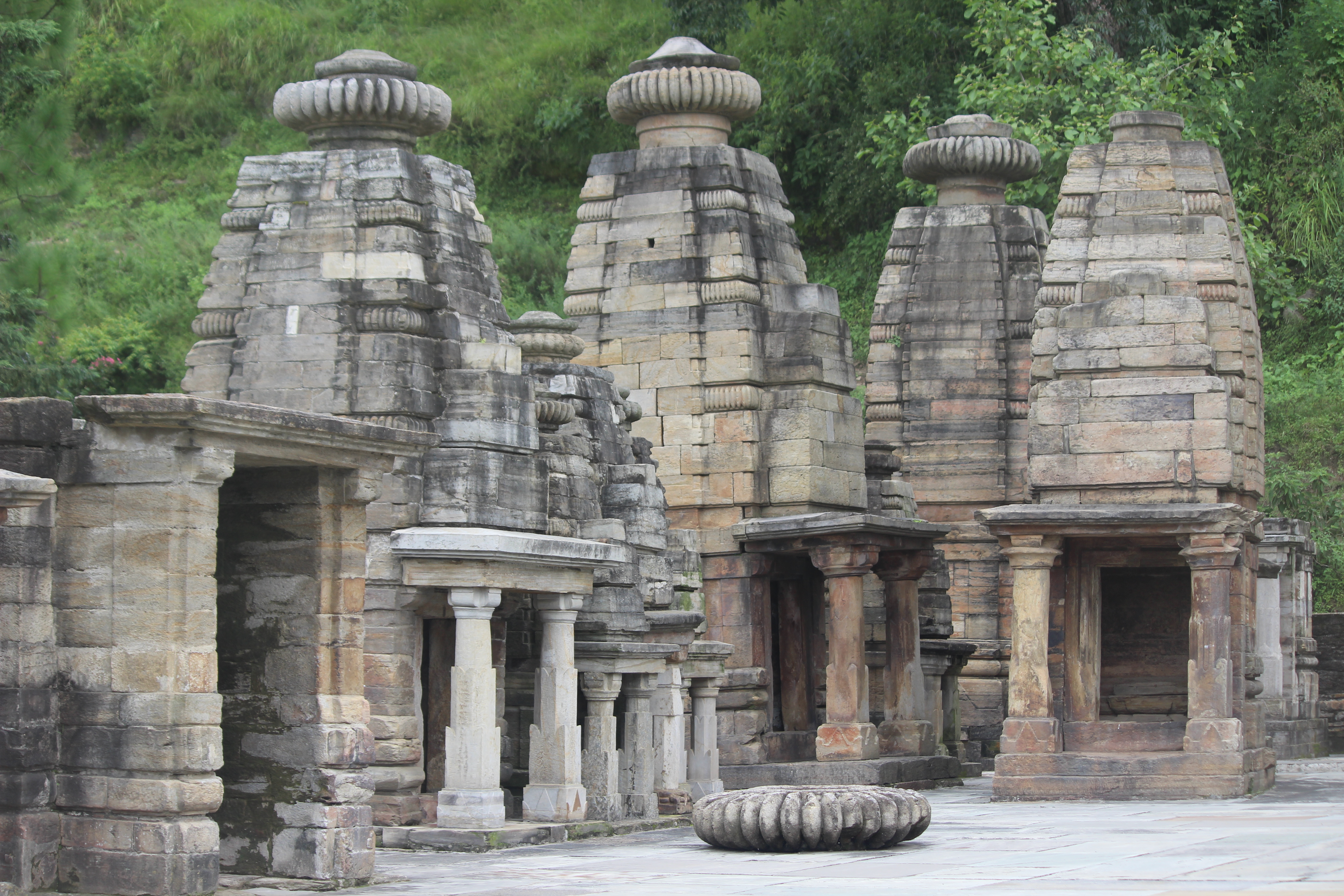
Sun Temple at Katarmal

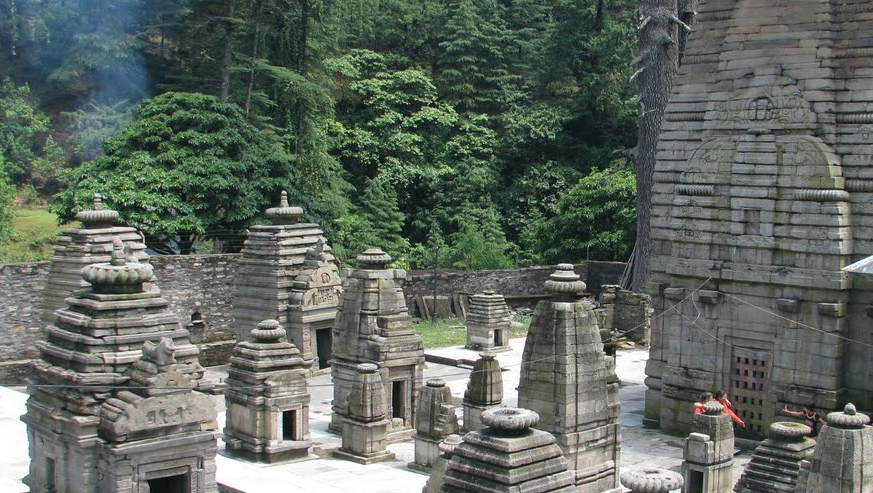
Jageshwar Temples Complex

Several temples in Uttarakhand are attributed to the Katyuri Kings.

=== Period of fragmentation ===
==== Fall of Katyuri dynasty ====
After the death of tyrant Vir Dev, there ensued a civil war among his sons. A fierce fight took place among them. The entire kingdom was ruined. The people of this very family divided the whole kingdom among themselves. At the places where they were formerly placed as provincial governors or faujdars, they declared themselves as independent kings. Outside Kumaun the feudatory kings of Garhwal, who were till then under the jurisdiction of the Katyuris, stopped paying revenue and also became independent kings.

The same condition prevailed in Kumaun when the Chand kings came there. Petty feudatory kings ruled here and there and attacking one another showed their power. King Brahmdeo of this very family (after whose name Brahmdeo Mandi was founded) established his kingdom in Kali Kumaun. His first fort lay in Sui and the Rawat king of Dumkot was under him. The second branch started ruling at Doti. The third established itself at Askot. Fourth settled down at Baramandal. The fifth maintained its sovereignty over Katyur and Danpur. The sixth branch ruled here and there in Pali whose main places then were Dwarahat and Lakhanpur. In this way, this extensive empire was divided into small parts.

==== Arrival of Chand dynasty ====
Besides these petty kings of the Katyuri family, during the time between the fall of the Katyuris and the arrival of the Chands, the region of Kumaun lay divided into petty kingdoms. Faldakol and Dhaniyakot lay under the authority of a Khati Rajput who regarded him as belonging to the Solar dynasty. Chaugarkha was ruled by a Padiyar king whose capital was Padyarkot. In the paragana of Gangolihat ruled a Mankoli king. He had come from Piuthan in modern-day Nepal and regarded himself as a Rajput of the Lunar dynasty. After ruling for seven to eight generations they were defeated by the Chands and returned to the place where their descendants still exist. Kota, Chhakhata and Kutauli came under the jurisdiction of the Khas kings. Sor, Sira, Darma, Askot, and Johar all were annexed to the kingdom of Doti. The first Chand king Som Chand also established a petty kingdom in Kali Kumaon after subjugating the powerful social groups there.

When the sun of the fortune of the Emperors of the Solar dynasty ( Katyuris) in Kumaun set and at places, small feudatory kings began to rule, the people said that the sun of Kumaun had set and there was night and darkness all over Kumaun. But on the arrival of the Chands, people started saying that there was night in Kumaun as the sun had set, but one thing good now is that now moonlight has appeared i.e. kings of the Lunar dynasty (Chands) have come. That there is again light in the earth sunk in darkness.

=== Chand dynasty ===
Sometime in the 8th century, the Chand dynasty was established by King Som Chand, He continued to call his state Kurmanchal, and established its capital in Champawat or Kali Kumaon. At that time Kumaon was going through a period of fragmentation, and the Chands ruled as petty kings. They slowly developed into a major power of the Himalayas and near after 1450 had unified Kumaon under King Ratna Chand.

The Baleshwar and Nagnath temples were built in this city during the 11th and 12th centuries. During this period, learning and new forms of painting (the pahari school of art) developed.

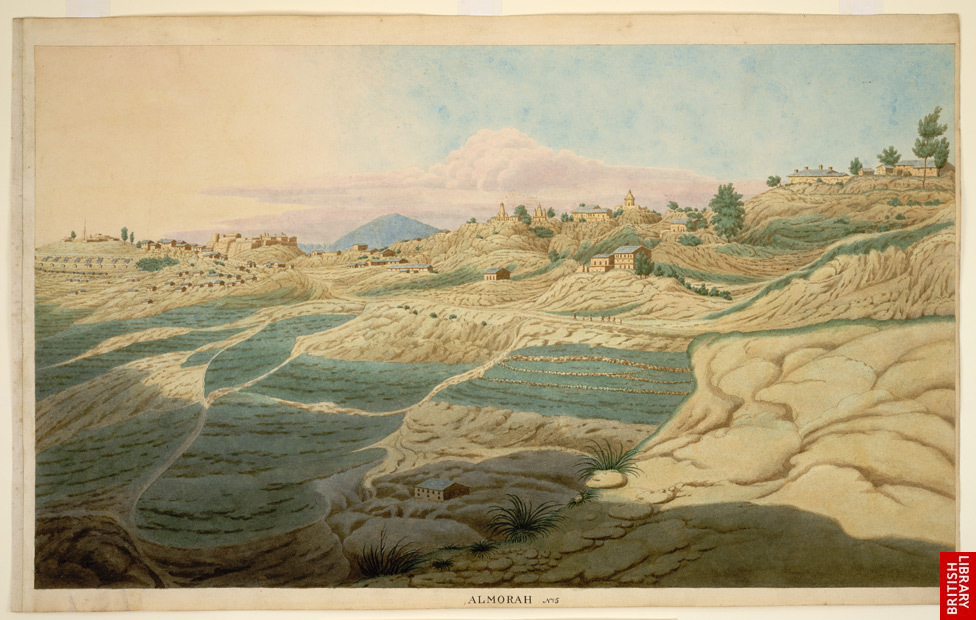
Painting of Lal Mandi and Malla Mala, Almora by Hyder Young Hearsay in 1815.

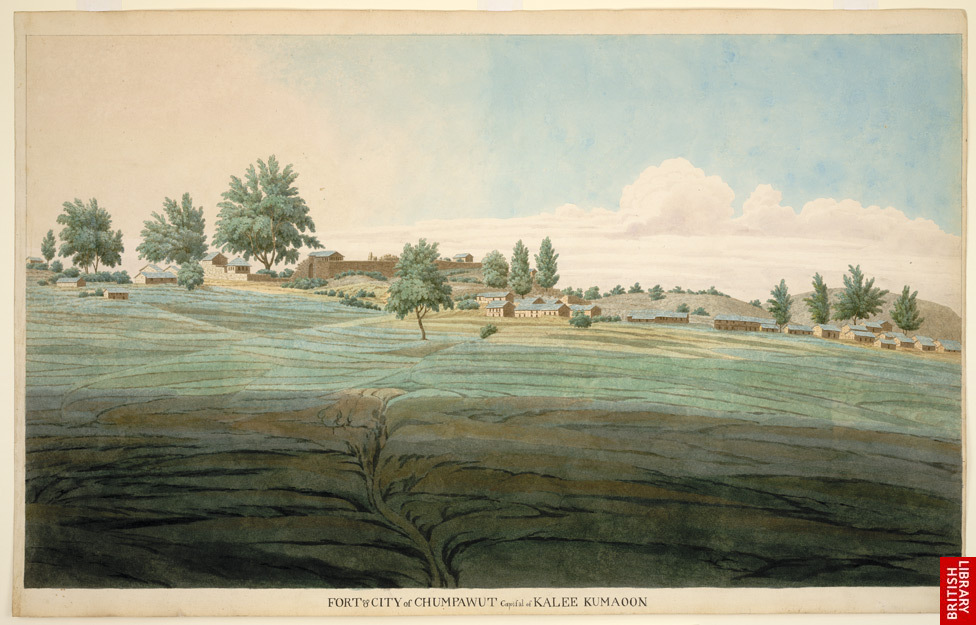
Painting of Champawat Fort, Champawat by Hyder Young Hearsay in 1815.

=== Origin and role of the Mehra and Fartyal factions ===
Etymological records suggest that the two most important clans of Kumaon, the Mehras (or Mahars) and the Fartyals, were originally descended from two brothers who migrated to the region from the plains, likely from the Rajputana areas.

According to regional historical traditions and folklore, an early local ruler's queen was suffering severe pain under the curse of a giant snake. The king proclaimed a massive reward for anyone who could eliminate the serpent and cure the queen. The two brothers stepped forward to accept the challenge. During the confrontation, the elder brother used a heavy stone (shila) to pin down and smash the snake's tail, while the younger brother drew his dagger (katar) to deliver the killing blow to its head, successfully breaking the curse.

A bitter dispute subsequently arose between the brothers over who deserved the primary credit and reward—the one who pinned the snake or the one who killed it. This historic argument permanently split their lineages into two rival political factions:

- The Mehra Faction (Malladhara): Descended from the younger brother, they traditionally held jurisdiction over the highlands and northern mountain tracts (Malla-desh).
- The Fartyal Faction (Talladhara): Descended from the elder brother, they held administrative oversight over the lower valleys and southern regions (Talla-desh).

Under the later Chand kings, this rivalry was formalized into a permanent administrative system of checks and balances. Together with the Karki and Bora clans, they formed the Char Burha (The Four Elders), a powerful privy council that held veto power over royal decrees and heavily influenced the internal stability of the kingdom.

==== Peak and invasion of Taklakot (Tibet) ====
Portrait of Maharaja Baz Bahadur Chand, by an unknown painter. The name of the king of Kumaon is written on the top-left corner in Takri Script.

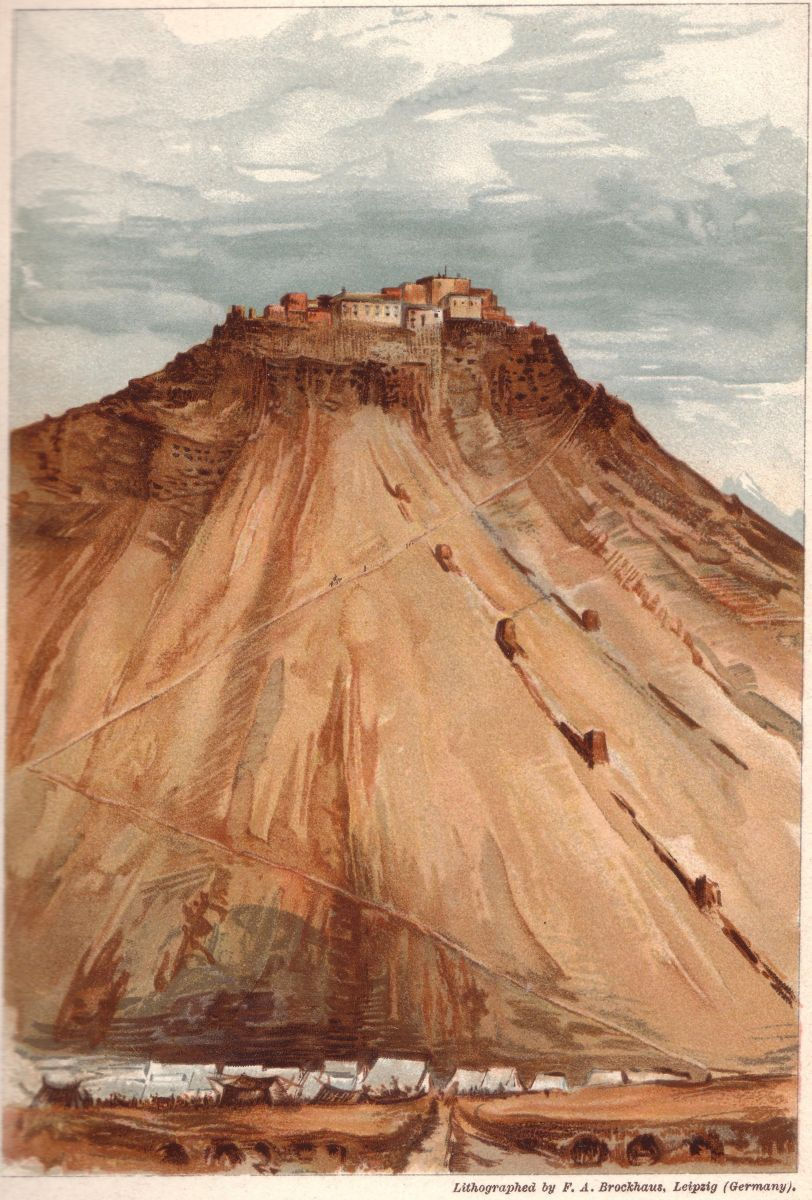
Painting of Taklakot Fort, by Arnold Henry Savage Landor

Many pilgrims came to the court of Baz Bahadur Chand to complain about the Huniyas (the area from northwestern Tibet till the borders of Ladakh at that time was known as Hundesh, and Tibetans there were called Huniyas) robbing them on their pilgrimage to Kailash Manasarovar, and committing atrocities. Being quite religious, he could not stand it, and decided to bring an end to this problem. Baz Bahadur Chand himself led his army through Juhar pass and entered Tibetan territory, which was then under Khoshut Khanate. He captured the fort of Taklakot in 1670. This was the first time in history that an Indian king had captured this stronghold of Tibet.

==== Conflicts and battles ====
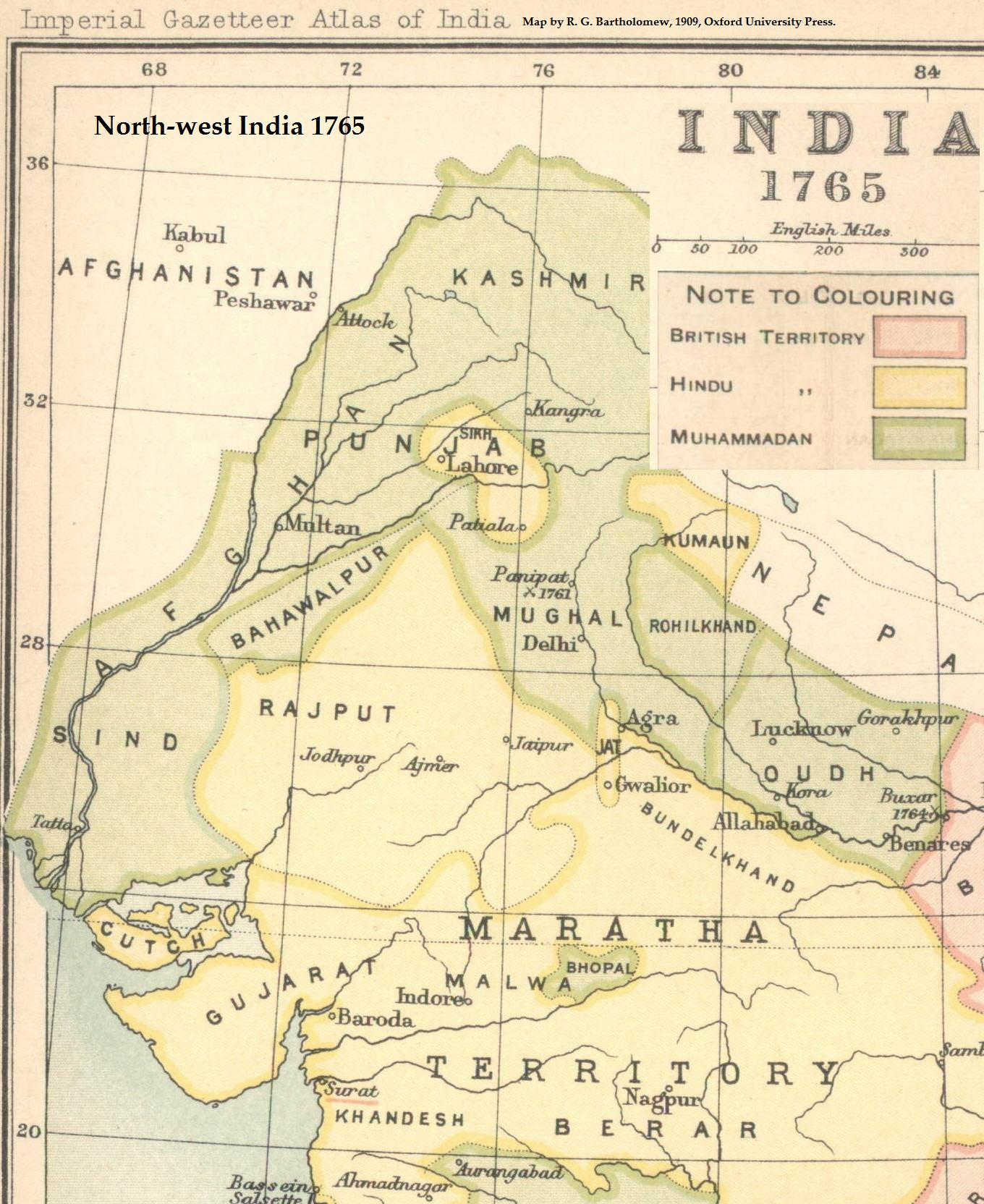
Kumaon kingdom in 1765 from the Imperial Gazetteer of India

King Gyan Chand, the King of Kumaon, ascended the throne in 1698. In 1699 he invaded Garhwal, which was under the King Fateh Shah . He crossed Ramganga River and plundered Sabli, Khatli, and Sainchar. In 1701, Fateh Shah entered in Chaukot (now Syalde region with 3 part, Talla Chaukot (lower), Malla Chaukot (Upper) and Bichla Chaukot (middle)) and Gewar Valley (region of Chaukhutia, Masi, and Dwarahat) as reply. The Kumaonis defeated the Garhwalis in the Battle of Duduli (near Melchauri in Garhwal). In 1707, the Kumaoni forces annexed Juniyagarh in Bichla Chaukot (Syalde), and razed the old fort at Chandpur Garhi, the capital of Garhwal kingdom. On 13 July 1715, Kumaoni troops clashed with Garhwali troops that were moving to Moradabad and Bareilly. An ally of the Mughal Empire, Kumaon was encouraged to continue fighting Garwhal until they submitted to the Mughal Empire. The Mughal Empire was against Garwhal because of their funding of rebels in Punjab. Twice in the second year of Farrukh Siyar's reign (between 25 July and 19 December 1713) the Kumaon chief sent him booty obtained in the battles against the combined forces of the Srinagar-Garhwal chief and his Jat and Gujar allies. In early 1715, Kumaon finally captured Srinagar from Garwhal, sending Garwhali chiefs into Mughal courts. In 1742 Ali Mohammed Khan of Rohilkhand invaded Kumaon and annexed Kashipur, Rudrapur, and two other Kumaoni parganas.

==== Nepalese invasion and its defeat ====
In the latter half of the 18th century, the power of Kumaon was on decline, as the prince Mahendra Chand was unable to properly administer the country and conflicts with other neighbouring kingdoms, natural calamities, intrigues and dissensions further weakened the kingdom.

Seeing this opportunity, in 1791 the Kingdom of Nepal invaded Kumaon. Gorkha army led by the Gorkha commanders Bahadur shah, Kazi Jagjit Pande, Amar Singh Thapa and Sur Singh Thapa set to attack Kumaon from Doti. One regiment went from Kali Kumaon to Sor, another set out to capture Visung. When the news of the sudden invasion reached Almora, Mahendra Chand summoned his troops and taking a contingent with him moved towards Gangolihat.

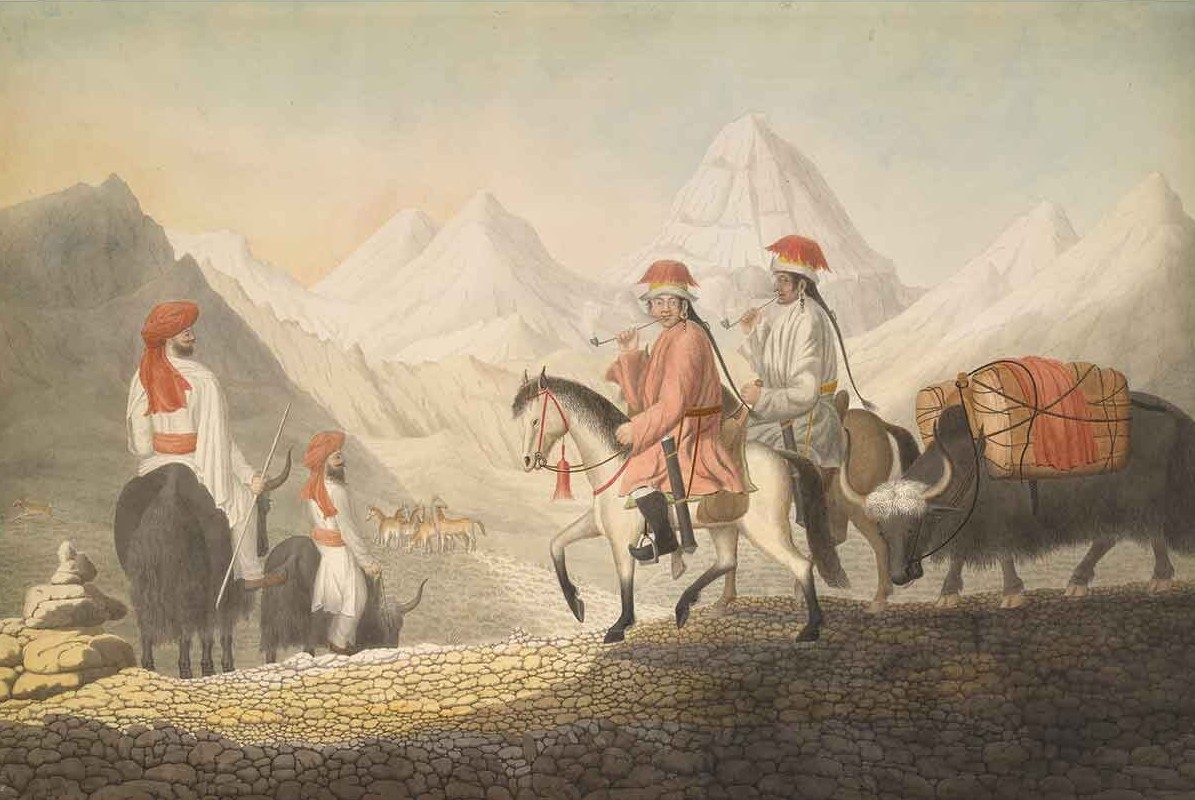
A painting by Hyder Young Hearsay showing him and William Moorcroft disguised as Indians meeting Tibetans on horseback while travelling to Kailash Manasarovar, where Europeans were not allowed, 1812, before Kumaon came under British jurisdiction. They were arrested on their way back by Nepali authorities stationed in Kumaon.

Amar Singh Thapa with his troops attacked the Kumaoni contingent but he was defeated and he escaped. However, a few hours later he came back with a larger army and better preparation, and totally surrounded Kumaon from the west. Mahendra Chand hearing about the defeat and death of his uncle, Diwan (Prime Minister) Lal Singh, became nervous and fled, thus Gorkhas finding their path clear reached and captured Almora and Kumaon was annexed to the Kingdom of Nepal. kingdom of Garhwal was also annexed by the Gorkhas in 1804, after they accepted the suzerainty of the Qing dynasty and could optimise their resources on expansion again.

=== 24-year Gorkha occupation of Kumaon (Gorkhyol) ===
The Gorkha rule over Kumaon lasted for 24 years and has been termed as "cruel and oppressive" in a number of texts. Kumaon and Garhwal were made into governorates within the Kingdom of Nepal. Kumaonis were not given political representation and all offices were occupied by Nepali administrators. Kumaonis and Garhwalis alike were mistreated. The Gorkhas were not keen on integrating Kumaon and Garhwal fully into the Kingdom of Nepal, or providing for the people there, rather they only though of the conquered territories as frontier states, to maintain distance from the East India Company.

The Gorkhas were also involved in slave trade consisting of Kumaonis and Garhwalis, who were captured and sold in the markets. Excessive taxation, slavery and mistreatment made the Gorkhas unpopular in Kumaon and Garhwal, whose cruel treatment towards the natives is still bitterly remembered today. The justice system of the Gorkhas was based on superstitions, which failed to provide justice to those who needed it.

Kumaon as a part of North-Western Provinces in British India, 1857

The only architectural advancements during the period was a road connecting Kali River to Srinagar via Almora.

=== Kumaon province ===
The Gorkhas were defeated by the East India Company in Anglo-Nepalese War and were forced to cede Kumaon to the British as part of the Treaty of Sugauli in 1816. The Kumaon region was joined with the eastern half of the Garhwal region and was governed as a chief-commissionership, also known as the Kumaon province, on the non-regulation system. In seventy years it was governed by three successive administrators: Mr. Traill, Mr J. H. Batten and Sir Henry Ramsay. The British set up a small administrative unit to govern the region, known as Patwari Halka.

== Government ==
=== Maharaja ===
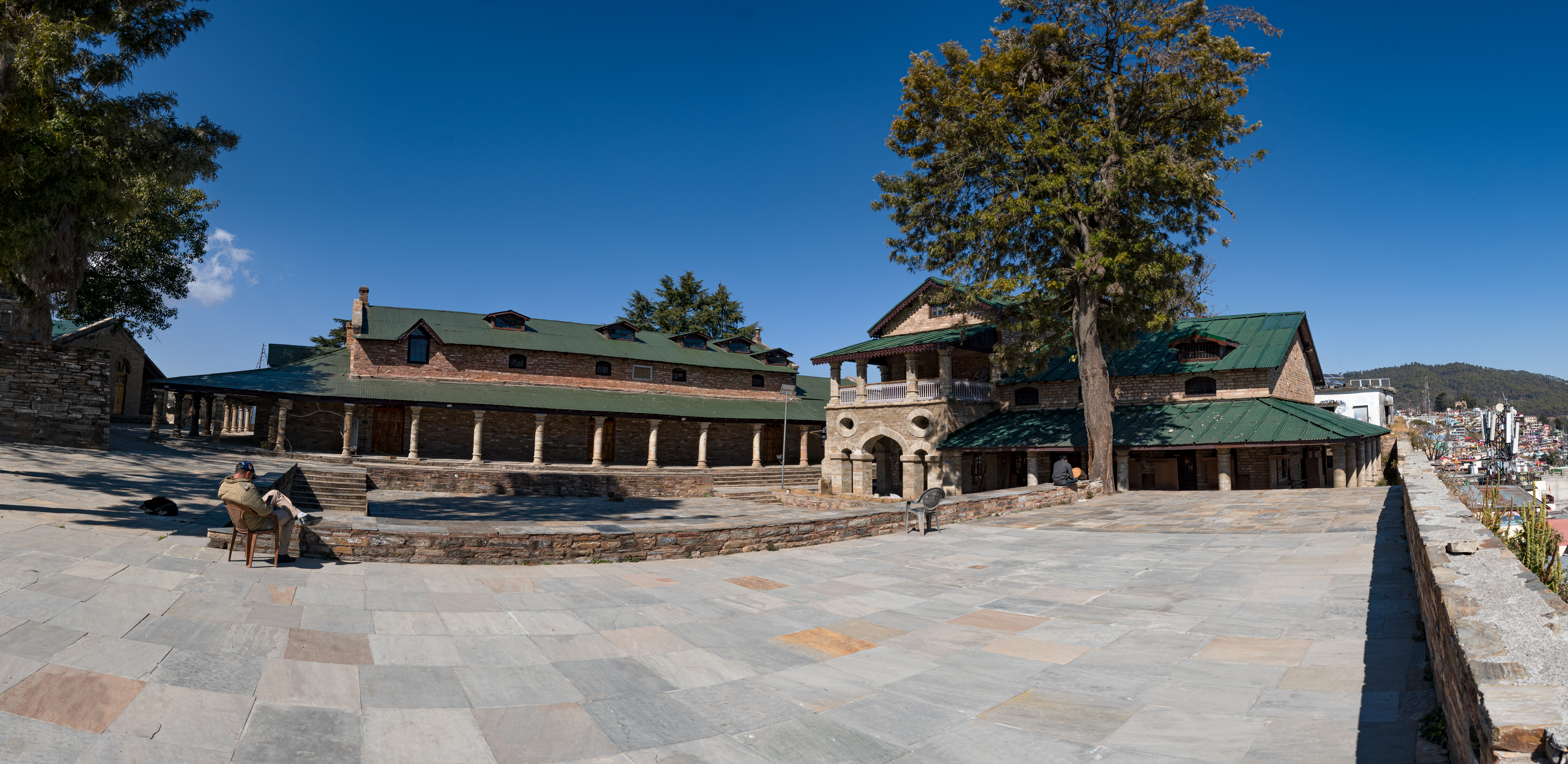
This Palace Fortress was built during the reign of King Rudra Chand (1568–1597) in the capital of Kumaon, Almora. It was named 'Malla Mahal' or upper palace. 'Talla Mahal' or lower palace is now a district hospital.

The Seal of the Maharaja was necessary to issue any order on paper or copper plates. But the Maharaja could only authorise the orders if the Diwan found it just and fair. The Maharaja couldn't give out official orders by himself. Officers and managers were appointed by the monarch in his Durbar by the recommendation of the Diwan. The posts of deputy-diwan and the other ministers were handed out to the most influential and able people. These posts were not usually hereditary but sometimes were occupied by one family or clan for a long time.

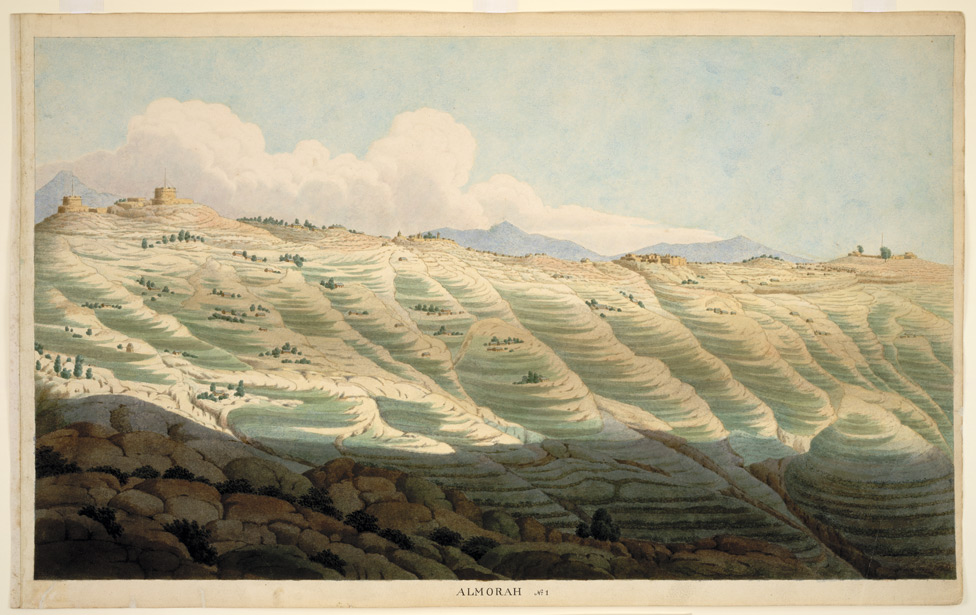
Malla Mahal can be seen in this painting by Hyder Young Hearsay, 1815.

Since the rulers were mostly religious, rajgurus and purohits were appointed to give the Maharaja spiritual and administrative advice. These posts were usually occupied by a single family. They conducted all religious ceremonies related to the Maharaja, the Diwan or the factions.

==== Royal seal ====
The copper-plates of Chand kings were called katardar (कटारदार) as the kings instead of putting their signatures made the mark of their dagger on them. Their names used to be engraved in the beginning of the copper-plate or the paper document.

=== Central government ===
==== Diwan ====
The leader who commanded majority within the Mahar faction and Fartyal faction was appointed the diwan (prime minister, दीवान; دیوان).

==== The royal durbar (court) ====
The royal court (शाही दरबार) was the centre of command for the entire kingdom. It was situated in the Malla Mahal (मल्ला महाल) in Almora, the capital of Kumaon. The officials that sat there were

- Kardars (administrators or revenue officers, करदार) were appointed by the diwan.
- Rajguru (royal priest, राजगुरु) and the purohits (royal chaplains, पुरोहित) were appointed by the monarch.
- Karbaris (managers, कारोबारी) were also appointed by the monarch, likely with the advice of his diwan.
- Mantris (ministers, मंत्री), were also a part of the royal court, and each was assigned specific roles.

=== Burhas, Sayanas and Thokdars ===
==== Burhas and Sayanas ====
There was a class of Rajput nobles in eastern and western Kumaon known as Burha and Sayana who by virtue of their functions, exercised an under-proprietary interest in the land they administered. The Sayana in western Kumaon and the Burha in eastern Kumaon were not only charged with the duty of revenue collection and land management over wide areas, but also discharged civil and military functions. The position of the Sayana and Burha were hereditary and in the hands of politically powerful families. The Sayana and Burha held revenue-free land in payment for their services but they also charged dustoor (customary dues) from the headmen of the villages under their jurisdiction. The dustoor traditionally comprised a leg of every goat killed by the headman and offerings also from the headmen of milk, ghee, sag-pat (vegetables and fruits) and food-grain and occasionally cash on the occasion of a birth or marriage in the household of the former and on the dashara and sankranti festivals. The Burhas and Sayanas were given special privileges to use their own insignia, flag and musical instruments. The Burhas of Kali Kumaon very frequently formed a consultative body in state affairs, especially when the succession to the raj was doubtful, consequently they have all along played a very important part in the history of Kumaon. In Pali, there were four Sayanas, two Manrals, one Bisht and one Bangari. In Kali Kumaon, there were four Burhas in number of the Bora, Karki, Taragi and Chaudhari clans.

==== Thokdars ====
The Thokdars were lower down in the political or military hierarchy. The Thokdar received the same sort of dues, but to a less extent, and his title was of less significance. He had no right to drums or standards at his installation, and was not called on for advice in matters of state. The Thokdars in Pali and Kali Kumaon worked under the Burhas and Sayanas.

==== Kamins ====
The Kamins were altogether of an inferior grade, and what influence he possessed was due to his position and its emoluments. He did not have any right on village land and property. He supplied bardaish, that is, coolies and supplies for the state services, and paid dues to the Sayana or Burha above him, but not to the Thokdar.

=== Local government ===
==== Pradhan ====
- Pradhan (पधान) was found in every village who was below the ranks of the above three. He used to collect land revenue. He also discharged the functions of police in the village. He had to remain under the subjugation of Sayana who was born in his village. This post was hereditary.

==== Kotal and pahari (attendants and police) ====
- Kotal (कोताल) was under Padhan who was appointed or could be expelled by him. He used to work as a clerk and an assistant of Padhan.
- Pahri (security guard/policeman, पहरी) was kept in every village who usually used to work as the attendant of the village. He used to manage the postal affairs of the village, collect grains, and patrol the village. He mostly belonged to the shudra community. He also received grains and other food items as donation on festivals.

==== Patwari and kanungo ====
- Patwari (पटवारी) was the village accountant in charge of keeping land records and other important documents.
- Kanungo (कानूनगो) was the village land revenue officer incharge of keeping records regarding land and agricultural revenue.

The copper-plate issued in the time of the Chand kings was signed by all the officers, which indicates the sense of responsibility of the officers.

=== Feudal system ===
==== Thatvan, khaykar and sirtan ====
- Thatvan (थतवन) was the landowner, who held all right to his land.
- Khaykar (खैकर) was the one who lived and worked on the farming land, although he did not own it. He was chosen by the Thatvan to work on his land, and his position was not permanent. He was the one responsible for paying agricultural revenue. He paid taxes in cash and grains both.
- Sirtan (सिरतन) had similar function as the khaykar but was supposed to pay taxes in cash only.

=== Foreign influence ===
When the 50th king of Kumaon Raja Baz Bahadur Chand reinstated Kumaoni authority over Terai after meeting Emperor Aurangzeb and came back to Almora, he introduced those customs which he had seen in Muslim courts and also in those of other kings. Naubat (kettle drums, نوبت) and naqqāra-khāna (place where drummers sit to beat the drums, نقاره‌خانه) were built. Bearers of asa (a staff covered with golden silver plate, عصا) and ballam (a mace so prepared, बलम), the chopdars (ceremonial guards, چوبدار) were also appointed. The king had brought with him a few mace-bearers, drummers, mirasis, clowns and mimes from the plains. A brahmin confectioner was also engaged to prepare sweets for the palace.

== Economy ==
The Kumaoni economy for most of the time was prosperous and mainly based on minerals and weapons exports as well as tax revenue. The kingdom had trade relations with the Mughal Empire, neighbouring himalayan states and Tibet. Kumaon had a very elaborate taxing system and within it majority of the revenue came for agricultaral taxes. The Ain-i-Akbari by Abul Fazl mentions the annual revenue of Kumaon at the time of Emperor Akbar to be about 2,000,000 Rupees. Abul Fazl has stated many times that the kingdom of Kumaon was a wealthy state.

=== Coinage ===
Mughal coins were used for trading as well as collecting or distributing revenue. Kumaon also issued coins of various units. Its value was kept equal to that of Mughal coins. The unit for currency was the Rupee and its subunit was the Paisa.

=== Taxation policy ===
The type of taxes implemented during the Chand rule were

1. Jyuliya or Jhuliya (ज्युलिया, झुलिया) – which was collected on swings or bridges on the rivers.
2. Sirati (सिराती) – which was paid in cash.
3. Baikar (बैकार) – grain which was deposited in the royal court.
4. Rakhiya (रखिया) – which was collected on the occasion of Rakhsha Bandhan.
5. Kut (कुट) – grain which was collected in lieu of cash.
6. Bhent (भेंट) – gift that was given to monarchs and princes.
7. Ghodiyalo (घोड़ियालो) – for the monarch's horses.
8. Kukuryalo (कुकुरयलो) – for the monarch's dogs.
9. Byajdar (ब्याजदार) – for the money-lenders.
10. Bajaniya (बाजनिया) – for the male and female dancers.
11. Bhukadiya (भुकाड़िया) – for the syce (horse-keeper, سائس)
12. Manga (माँगा) – whenever the government demands money in times of need.
13. Sahu (साहू) – for the accountants
14. Rantgali (रंतगाली) – for the officers
15. Kheni kapini (खेनी कपिनी) – Kuli begar
16. Katak (कटक) – for the forces
17. Syuk (स्युक) – the tribute which was given to the monarch at a fixed time
18. Kaminchari or Sayanchari (कामिनचारी,सयानचारी) – for the officials such as Kamins and Sayanas
19. Garalja nege (गरल्जा नेगे) – for Patwari and Kanungo

The rules regarding the collection of taxes were very strict. Exemptions from taxes were rare. Land and agricultaral revenue was exempted only during famines. Written records for revenue collection were rarely kept.

Taxes were also levied on traders and there products during trade with Tibet. Merchants and traders coming from Tibet were supposed to pay Sirati to the Bhotiyas. The Kumaoni government itself levied taxes on products like gold dust, deer musk and salt.

=== Mining industry, natural resources and exports ===
Kumaon was one of the largest exporters of minerals and resources to the Mughal Empire. Mining was a major source of revenue for the kingdom of Kumaon. Many natural resources were traded with Tibet as well.

==== Minerals mined in Kumaon ====
The minerals found in Kumaon were

- Gold – Abul Fazl says that gold was found in abundance in the Northern mountains. Both he and Jahangir mention the gold mines in Kumaun. Gold was also collected from the sands of Ganga river. The tributaries of Ramganga also contained gold. But the extraction of gold from the river sands was a very expensive process and the margin of profit was very meagre.
- Silver – Silver mines were found in Kumaon.
- Copper – Copper was mined in Kumaon in large quantities and exported to Delhi.
- Iron – Iron was majorly mined in Kumaon and exported to the Mughal Empire according to Father Montserrat. Father Montserrate says that iron was found in the "neighbouring spurs of the Himalayas". Iron working survived till the British coloniolist era, in Ramgarh, Kumaon.
- Orpiment – Although found in lower quantities, the best quality orpiment was said to come from Kumaon. Orpiment was used as a pigment and dye, and was also used in traditional medicines. It was also majorly used by Mughal and Persian painters for a shade of yellow.
- Borax – Abu Fazl records Borax mines in his Ain-i-Akbari. But modern sources deny this claim.
- Lead – Lead was also produced in Kumaon.

==== Silk industry ====
The Ain-i-Akbari records the production of silk in Kumaon.

Raja Indra Chand opened silk-industry in his kingdom. In the seventh century the queen of Tibetan king Songtsen Gampo brought silk-worms to Tibet from China and his Nepali queen Bhrikuti Devi popularised it in Kathmadu valley in Nepal. From there silk was brought to Kumaun. This industry continued upto the Gorkha rule. During the reign of the Gorkhyalis this prosperous industry was ruined. For fodder of the silk-worms a large number of mulberry trees were planted. Weavers from the plains were summoned to weave silk.

A large building was built to serve as a silk factory. Inside, silkworms were kept, and branches of mulberry trees were placed as their fodder. The worms fed on mulberry leaves and spun cobweb-like structures, similar to spiders. Once these cobwebs matured, the weavers collected and purified them to produce silk. Some silk was kept white, while the rest was dyed in various colours. During the dyeing process, the weavers spread rumours called patarangyal (पतरंग्याल) in the town, believing that this practice enhanced the quality of the silk fabric.

==== Natural resources found in Kumaon ====
Kumaon is very rich in natural resources. The major resources exported were

- Medicinal plants – Various medicinal plants are found in large quantities in the Sivalik Hills. The plants were exported to Tibet and the Mughal Empire to be used to create medicines.
- Timber – Since the Siwalik Hills are rich in timber, Kumaon had a prosperous timber industry. Timber, especially that of Himalayan cedar (deodar, देवदार) was exported to both the Mughal Empire and Tibet.
- Other – Many other products were traded with Tibet like salt, sugar and wool products. The Bhotiya people were the main participants in the trans-Himalayan trade.

=== Agriculture ===
Agriculture was the main occupation of the Kumaoni people. The Terai region under Kumaon was highly fertile, and through the efforts of Maharaja Baz Bahadur Chand, agriculture was popularised in that area, creating abundance of food source. The mountainous regions were also highly fertile, and many types of crops were grown there.

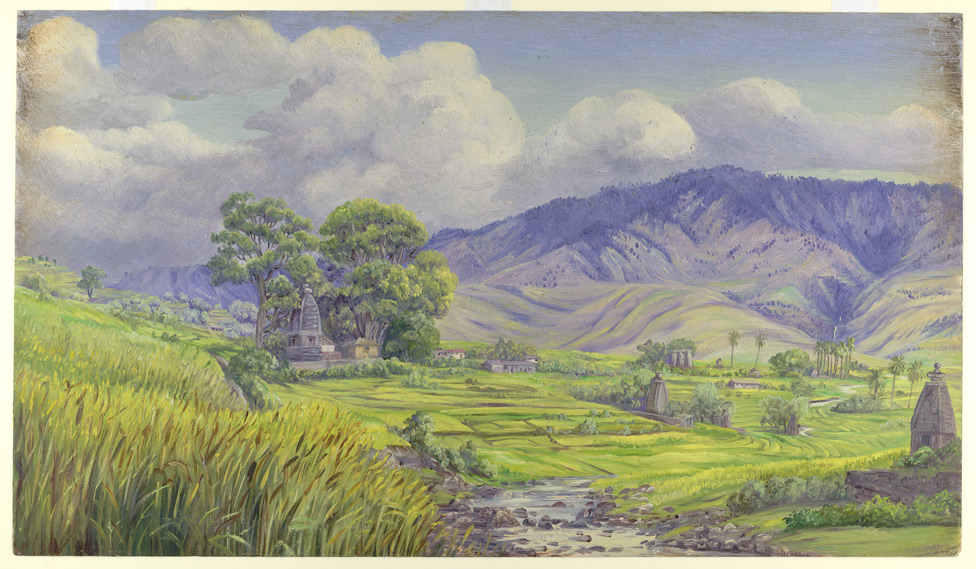
Painting of Dwarahat by Marianne North, 1878. Crops can be seen being grown on the left side of the painting. Since this painting was made not long after the annexation of Kumaon, it accurately depicts agricultural practices there as they would have been before.

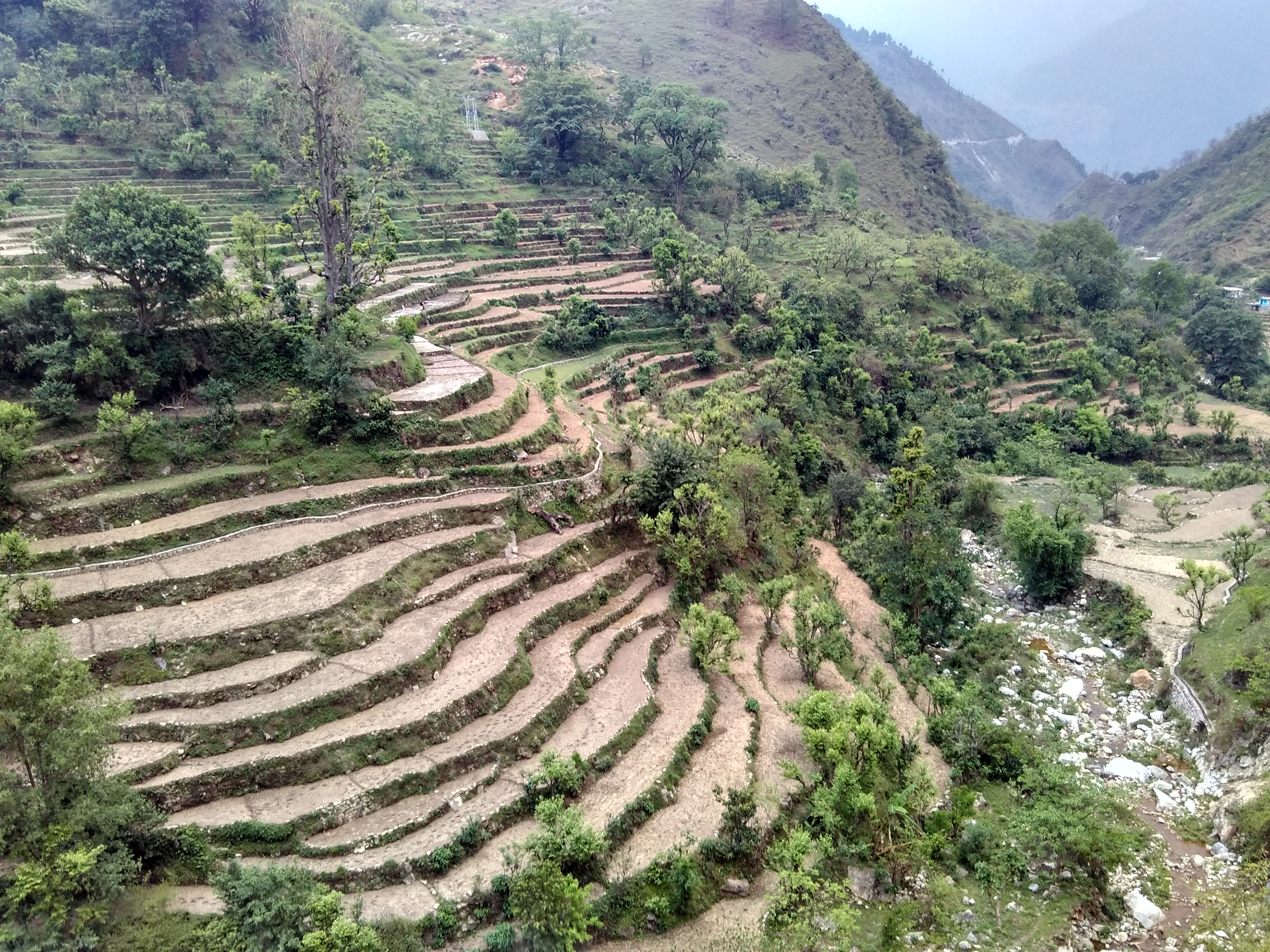
Terrace farming in Kumaon in the present time.

==== Major crops ====
- Cereals
1. Rice was the most popular crop grown in the Terai region. Red rice was also prominently grown in the mountainous regions of Kumaon.
2. Barley was a major crop in Kumaon.
3. Finger Millet was also majorly grown in Kumaon. It was a substitute for wheat, which was not grown widely in Kumaon.
4. Sorghum and Pearl millet were also grown in Kumaon.
- Pseudocereals – Buckwheat was a major crop in Kumaon. Amaranth was also grown in Kumaon.
- Mistletoe – Mistletoes were widely produced in Kumaon and exported throughout northern India.
- Pulses – Vigna mungo, black soybean, Macrotyloma uniflorum, pigeon pea, mung bean, lentil and chickpea were widely grown and consumed in Kumaon.
- Fruits
1. Bananas were widely grown in Kumaon. The bananas grown there are shorter in length and very thick.
2. Oranges were also widely grown in Kumaon, referred to as malta (माल्टा).
3. Mangoes were grown in valleys with hotter climate. There was a popular myth among the people of the Mughal Empire that mangoes grew year-round in Kumaon.
- Root vegetables – Potatoes and Taro were widely grown.
- Sugarcanes – Sugarcanes were grown in medium quantity in the hilly regions of Kumaon.
- Spices – Spices like turmeric and ginger were grown. Chillies were also grown in abundance.

==== Dairy products ====
Dairy products like curd, khoya and ghee were very popular in Kumaon and still are.

==== Beekeeping ====
Beekeeping was done in abundance in Kumaon. It was also popular during the British era.

In summers and rains blackbees came over to the hilly regions and built their hives in the inaccessible caves and caverns of the mountains. People from Danpur used to collect honey from these beehives. Honey produced from the pollens of various wild flowers was highly fragrant and tasteful.

=== Mercenaries ===
One of the major occupation of the Kumaoni people has been mercenarism. Men left their families and went to other states and kingdoms looking to fight wars on their behalf in return for money. They mostly went to muslim states like Mughal Empire, and its subahs like the Hyderabad State. Many Kumaonis served the Nizam of Hyderabad during the end of the 18th century.

The kingdom of Kumaon itself was state that fought wars for other larger empires in return for wealth and resources. Kumaon fought wars and battles on behalf of the Mughal Empire on many occasions.

=== Weapons manufacturing ===
Kumaun had a good reputation for its swords and daggers. Weapons made in Kumaon were also a favoured gift to give to the Mughal Emperors. Muskets and flintlocks were probably also produced locally, but were mostly imported from the Mughal Empire.

Since Kumaon was rich in iron and other metals, materials to manufacture weapons were easily secured.

== Foreign relations ==
Kumaon mostly remained independent and sovereign but maintained a tributary relationship with larger and powerful empires like the Delhi Sultanate and the Mughal Empire, despite minor conflicts occasionally. Kumaon maintained diplomatic representatives at the imperial Mughal court. Trade relations also flourished with the Mughal Empire as well as other Himalayan kingdoms. Tibet was also one of the major trade partners of Kumaon. The major passes between Kumaon and Tibet came under Kumaoni authority, and petty Tibetan chieftains near these passes paid tribute to the Kumaoni monarch. Kumaoni monarchs also engaged in matrimonial alliances with petty kingdoms of the plains as well as other Himalayan kingdoms. Kumaon also sent diplomatic missions to various rajput kingdoms from time to time.

=== Delhi Sultanate ===
The kingdom of Kumaon had tributary relations with the Delhi Sultanate. The Sultans of Delhi used to tour the region near Terai on hunting expeditions, and sometimes the Kumaoni monarchs used to accompany them.

Upon ascending the throne in 1374, one of the first actions taken by Maharaja Gyan Chand was to seek recognition from the Sultan of Delhi. During the reign of his grandfather, the Nawabs of Rohilkhand had seized control of the Terai region. Aware of this, Gyan Chand sent a formal letter to the Sultan of Delhi, Muhammad bin Tughlaq, asserting that the Terai Bhavar region had long been an integral part of the kingdom of Kumaon. He emphasised that the territory had once been under the rule of the Katyuri dynasty, and now it should now rightfully be governed by the Chand kings. At that time, Muhammad bin Tughlaq was on a hunting expedition. Gyan Chand travelled to meet him and, during the expedition, demonstrated his remarkable archery skills by shooting down an eagle that was carrying a serpent in its beak. Impressed by his expertise, Sultan Tughlaq immediately issued a firman (royal decree), granting Maharaja Gyan Chand dominion over the Terai Bhavar region, extending up to the Bhagirathi Ganga. As a mark of honour, the Sultan bestowed upon him the title of "Garud," symbolising the mythical eagle-like bird known for its power and precision. From that moment on, Maharaja Gyan Chand came to be known as Garud Gyan Chand.

=== Sur empire ===
Kumaon did not establish any close diplomatic ties with the short-lived Sur empire. In 1541, Khavas Khan, a famed general of Sher Shah Suri, who had chased Humayun out of India and had been against Islam Shah Suri's accession to the throne, sought refuge in the kingdom of Kumaon after a failed revolt, pleading for shelter from Maharaja Manik Chand of Kumaon. In response, Islam Shah Suri sent a formal letter to the Maharaja, demanding the surrender of Khavas Khan. Alongside this, the imperial commander was given orders to devastate Kumaon if the Maharaja refused to comply.

Undeterred by the threat, Maharaja Manik Chand sent a reply to the Sultan, stating:

"How can one imprison the man who has begged for my shelter? Till my last breath, I would not be guilty of such a mean act."

E.T. Atkinson, citing Abdullah's Tarikh-i-Dawudi, highlights that even contemporary Muslim historians acknowledged and praised the bravery of the Chand rulers. Atkinson remarks:

"The magnanimity shown by the Kumaoni Raja is a bright spot in the annals of the Chands and is recognised even by Mussalman historians."

Khavas Khan later surrendered himself to the Imperial forces and was beheaded on the order of Islam Shah Suri.

== Symbols ==
=== Emblem and flag ===
The cow was the royal emblem of the Chand dynasty of Kumaon. Cows are considered sacred in Hinduism, the religion of the Chand kings and the Kumaoni people. The cow was used in the emblem, seal, flag and coinage of the Chand dynasty. It was also used to symbolise Kumaon itself, like saying "Victory to the cow" would mean "Victory to Kumaon (the land whose banner is adorned with the cow)".

Slaughtering of cows was strictly prohibited in the kingdom of Kumaon, and was punishable by death.

Kiladars, Sayanas and Budhas had their personal standards and insignias. The Diwan used the seal of the monarch to issue orders.

=== Seal of the Maharaja of Kumaon ===
Seal of the Maharaja of Kumaon

The copper-plates of Chand kings were called katardar (कटारदार) as the kings instead of putting their signatures made the mark of their dagger on them. Their names used to be engraved in the beginning of the copper-plate. The name of chief officers as well were engraved in the copper plates. This very rule was followed while putting signatures on papers also.This can be seen in the official papers from the reign of Baz Bahadur Chand and Udyot Chand.

Kumaon was somewhat famous for its high quality swords and daggers, which were in demand in the Mughal Empire. This could be a reason as to why dagger was chosen as the seal.

== Culture ==
=== Language ===
The Kumaoni language is one of the Central Pahari languages. For a number of reasons, Kumaoni usage is shrinking rapidly. UNESCO's Atlas of the World's Languages in Danger designates Kumaoni as a language in the unsafe category which requires consistent conservation efforts.

=== Cuisine ===
Kumaoni cuisine is the food of the Kumaon region of Uttarakhand, India. Kumaoni food is simple and nutritious, suited to the harsh environment of the Himalayas.

== See also ==
- Kumaoni language
- Kumaoni people
- Kumaoni cuisine
- List of Hindu empires and dynasties
- List of Rajput dynasties and states
