= Huo'er =

Huo'er 霍尔乡ཧོར་ཤང
- Township
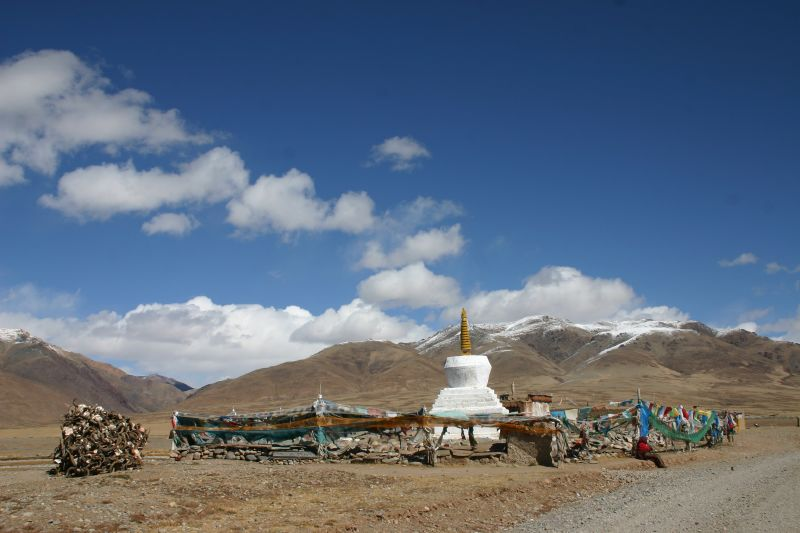
- Interactive map of Huo'er
- Location of the seat in the Tibet Autonomous Region
- Coordinates: 30.7736°N 81.6105°E
- Country: People's Republic of China
- Autonomous region: Tibet
- Prefecture: Ngari
- County: Burang County
- Time zone: UTC+8 (China Standard)

Hor (Tibetan: ཧོར, Wylie: hor) also known as Huo'er (Chinese: 霍尔乡; pinyin: huò'ěr xiāng) is a township in Burang County, Ngari Prefecture the Tibet Autonomous Region of China; by the shore of Lake Manasarovar. It was placed in the back on the main East-West highway that followed the Silk Road from Lhasa to Kashmir.
