= Rautela =

Rajput clan from Kumaon

Rautela is a Rajput clan from the Kumaon region of Uttarakhand.

== History ==
The Rautelas are descendants of the junior members of the Chand dynasty. Among the Chands, the title of the eldest son was Gusain and the younger sons were called Rautela.
