= Purang County =

Purang County སྤུ་ཧྲེང་རྫོང · 普兰县 Burang
- County
- Burang County
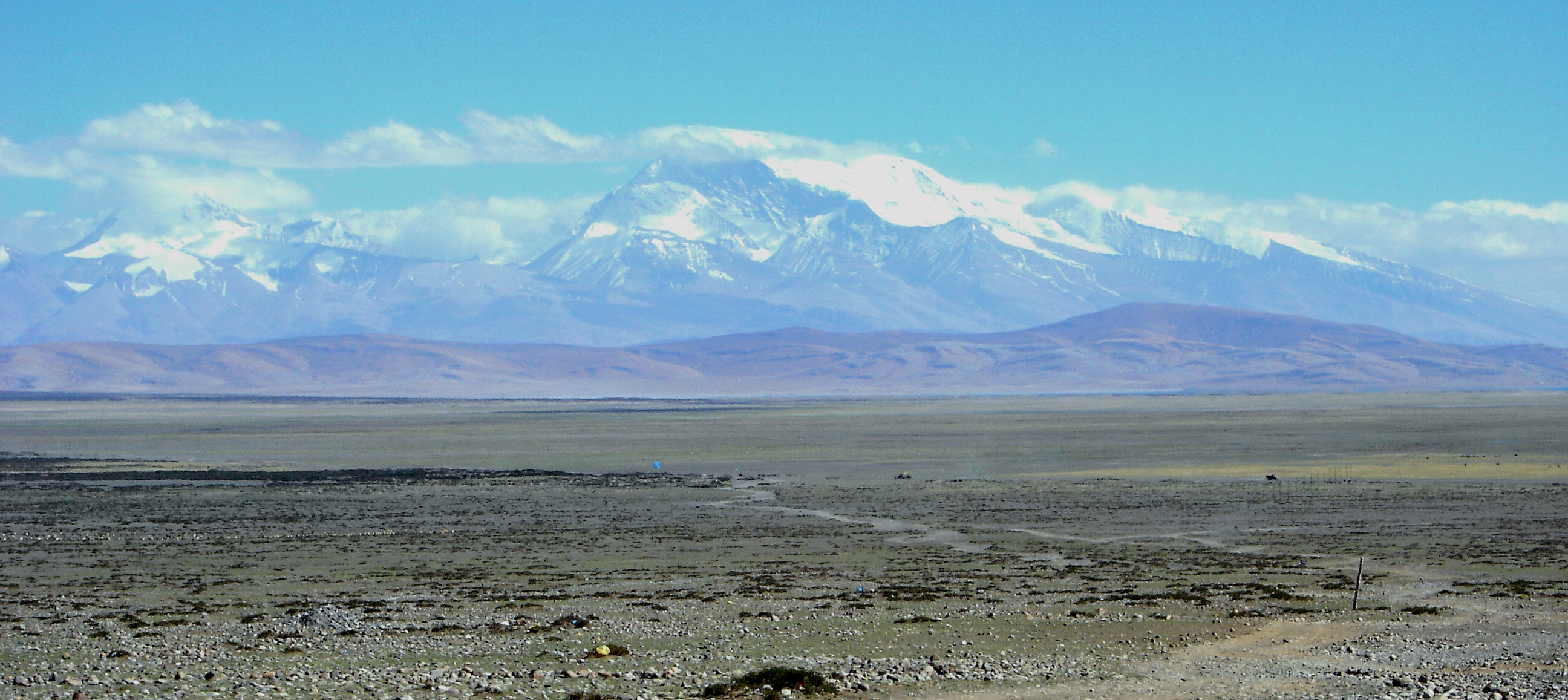
- Gurla Mandhata 7,694 metres (25,243 ft)

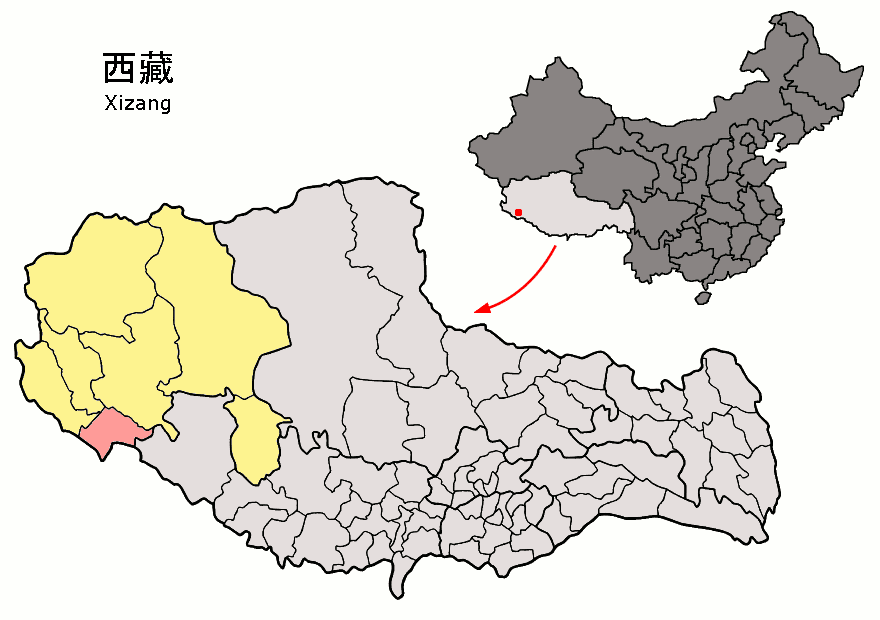
- Location of Purang County within Tibet

- Location of the seat in the Tibet AR Purang (Tibet) Purang (China)
- Coordinates (Purang County government): 30°17′25″N 81°10′38″E
- Country: China
- Autonomous region: Tibet
- Prefecture: Ngari
- County seat: Purang

Area
  - Total: 12,539 km^{2} (4,841 sq mi)

Population (2020)
  - Total: 12,242
  - Density: 0.97631/km^{2} (2.5286/sq mi)
- Time zone: UTC+8 (China Standard)
- Postal code: 859500
- Website: pl.al.gov.cn

Purang County

Chinese name
- Simplified Chinese: 普兰县
- Traditional Chinese: 普蘭縣
Transcriptions
Standard Mandarin
- Hanyu Pinyin: Pǔlán Xiàn
Yue: Cantonese
- Jyutping: pou^{2}laan^{4} jyun^{2}

Tibetan name
- Tibetan: སྤུ་ཧྲེང་རྫོང
Transcriptions
- Wylie: spu hreng rdzong
- Tibetan Pinyin: Burang Zong

Purang County or Burang County (Tibetan: སྤུ་ཧྲེང་རྫོང; Chinese: 普兰县) is an administrative division of Ngari Prefecture in the Tibet Autonomous Region (TAR) of China. The county seat is Purang Town, known as Taklakot in Nepali. The county covers an area of 12,539 square kilometres (4,841 sq mi), and has a population of 9,657 as of 2010.

== Geography ==
=== Political geography ===
Purang County has TAR's south-western border with Nepal's Sudurpashchim and Karnali province, Darchula, Bajhang and Humla District. Further west, India's Uttarakhand State, Pithoragarh district and Chamoli district borders. Buddhist, Hindu and Jain pilgrims going to Lake Manasarovar and Mount Kailash enter from Nepal via Simikot, and from India via Dharchula.

The county is bounded by other counties in the Ngari Prefecture, including Zanda to the west, Gar to the northwest and Gê'gyai to the north. To the east is Zhongba County of Shigatse Prefecture.

=== Physical geography ===
The county covers an area of 12,539 square kilometres (4,841 sq mi), and has a population of some 9,058 people as of 2010. The county seat, located in the Jirang Neighborhood Committee, is located only 20 kilometres (12 mi) from Nepalese territory, and 450 kilometres (280 mi) north-west of Kathmandu. It is an important Chinese customs point between Tibet, Nepal and India. Much of the county consists of river valleys of mountains and lakes such as Kangrinboqê (also known as Mount Kailash), The Naimonany Peak Gunrla and Lake Maponen Yamco Lake Manasarowar. The Karnali River fed by Mabja Zangbo is also a prominent geographical feature of the landscape. Wildlife commonly seen in the far south-western Tibetan county are wild donkeys, wild yaks, yellow goats, antelope, rock goat, lynxes, foxes, leopards and marmots.

==== Climate ====
Purang County has a cool semi-arid climate (Köppen BSk), with pleasant to warm summers and freezing winters. The annual average temperature in the county is 4.0 °C (39.2 °F), and annual precipitation averages 147 mm (5.8 in). Temperatures are hottest on average in July, when the daily mean is 14.7 °C (58.5 °F), and coldest in January when the average is −7.4 °C (18.7 °F).

Climate data for Burang County, elevation 3,900 m (12,800 ft), (1991–2020 normals, extremes 1981–2010)
Month	Jan	Feb	Mar	Apr	May	Jun	Jul	Aug	Sep	Oct	Nov	Dec	Year
Record high °C (°F)	11.3 (52.3)	13.7 (56.7)	15.8 (60.4)	18.8 (65.8)	23.5 (74.3)	27.0 (80.6)	28.4 (83.1)	26.7 (80.1)	25.8 (78.4)	20.3 (68.5)	16.7 (62.1)	12.9 (55.2)	28.4 (83.1)
Mean daily maximum °C (°F)	0.2 (32.4)	1.3 (34.3)	5.4 (41.7)	10.6 (51.1)	15.2 (59.4)	19.4 (66.9)	21.5 (70.7)	20.8 (69.4)	18.3 (64.9)	12.6 (54.7)	8.3 (46.9)	4.5 (40.1)	11.5 (52.7)
Daily mean °C (°F)	−7.4 (18.7)	−6.0 (21.2)	−1.9 (28.6)	3.4 (38.1)	7.9 (46.2)	12.4 (54.3)	14.7 (58.5)	14.1 (57.4)	11.2 (52.2)	4.5 (40.1)	−0.5 (31.1)	−4.4 (24.1)	4.0 (39.2)
Mean daily minimum °C (°F)	−13.8 (7.2)	−12.4 (9.7)	−8.3 (17.1)	−2.7 (27.1)	1.7 (35.1)	6.5 (43.7)	9.3 (48.7)	8.9 (48.0)	5.3 (41.5)	−2.3 (27.9)	−7.5 (18.5)	−11.3 (11.7)	−2.2 (28.0)
Record low °C (°F)	−28.4 (−19.1)	−25.6 (−14.1)	−24.0 (−11.2)	−15.6 (3.9)	−9.7 (14.5)	−1.9 (28.6)	0.2 (32.4)	1.6 (34.9)	−3.2 (26.2)	−9.4 (15.1)	−17.2 (1.0)	−29.4 (−20.9)	−29.4 (−20.9)
Average precipitation mm (inches)	12.6 (0.50)	16.4 (0.65)	19.4 (0.76)	10.4 (0.41)	6.8 (0.27)	11.7 (0.46)	18.5 (0.73)	25.6 (1.01)	11.3 (0.44)	7.7 (0.30)	3.8 (0.15)	3.1 (0.12)	147.3 (5.8)
Average precipitation days (≥ 0.1 mm)	4.1	4.2	5.7	4.4	3.8	3.7	7.3	9.3	3.8	1.4	0.8	0.9	49.4
Average snowy days	6.3	6.4	8.5	8.1	4.5	0.3	0.1	0	0.3	1.8	1.7	2.1	40.1
Average relative humidity (%)	41	45	46	45	45	50	58	60	53	42	34	31	46
Mean monthly sunshine hours	223.3	216.9	270.9	284.1	311.4	294.3	265.7	256.8	264.9	287.7	258.9	248.7	3,183.6
Percentage possible sunshine	69	68	72	73	73	70	62	64	73	83	82	79	72
Source: China Meteorological Administration

== Administrative divisions ==
The county is divided into 1 town and 2 townships. The county government is seated in the Gyitang Residential Community (སྐྱིད་ཐང་སྡེ་ཁུལ་གྲོང་ལྷན།, 吉让社区居委会), Purang Town.

Name	Chinese	Hanyu Pinyin	Tibetan	Wylie
Town
Purang Town	普兰镇	Pǔlán zhèn	སྤུ་ཧྲེང་གྲོང་རྡལ།	spu hreng grong rdal
Townships
Baga Township (Parga)	巴嘎乡	Bāgā xiāng	བར་ག་ཤང་།	bar ga shang
Hor Township	霍尔乡	Huò'ěr xiāng	ཧོར་ཤང་།	hor shang

== History ==
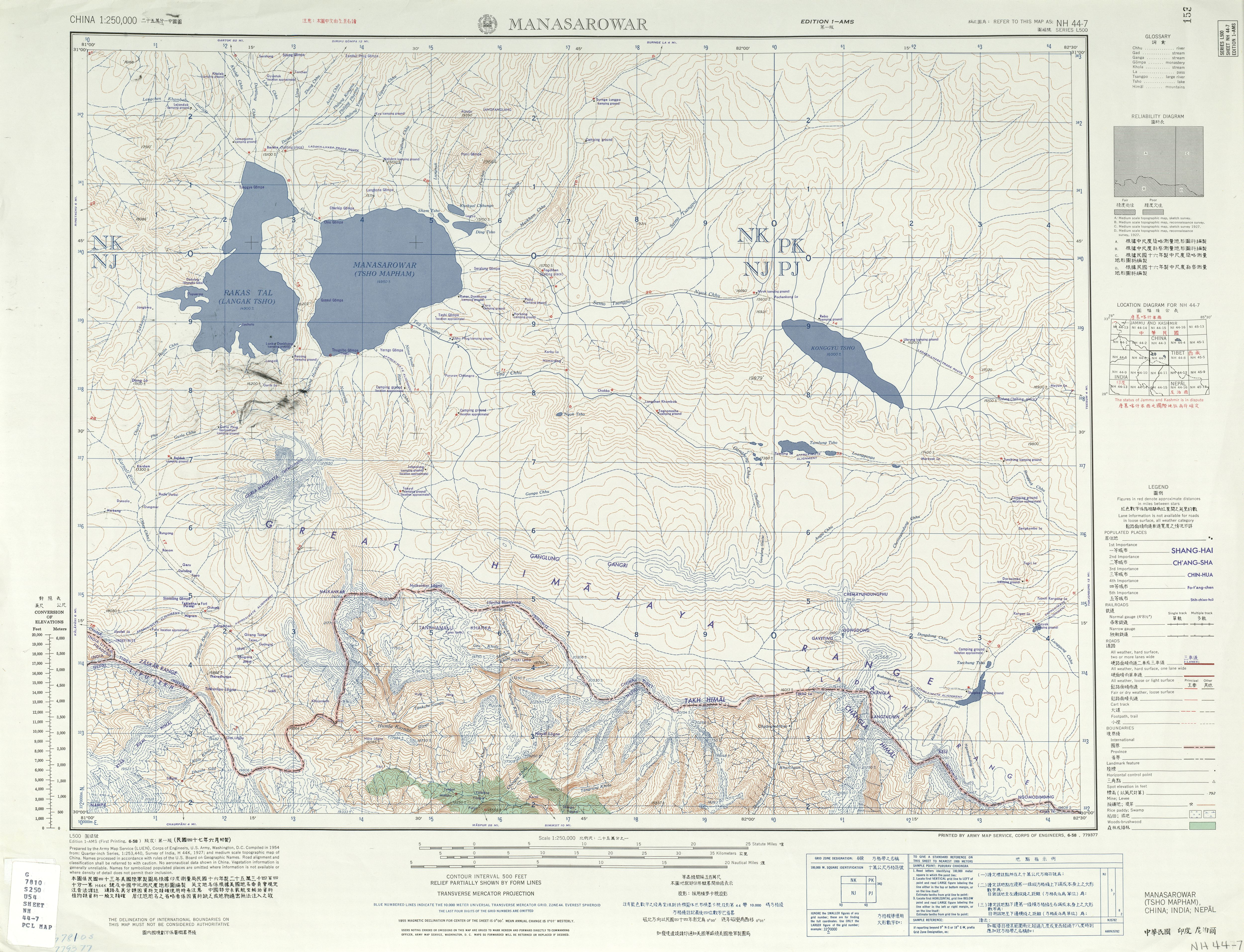
Lake Manasarovar area (1954)

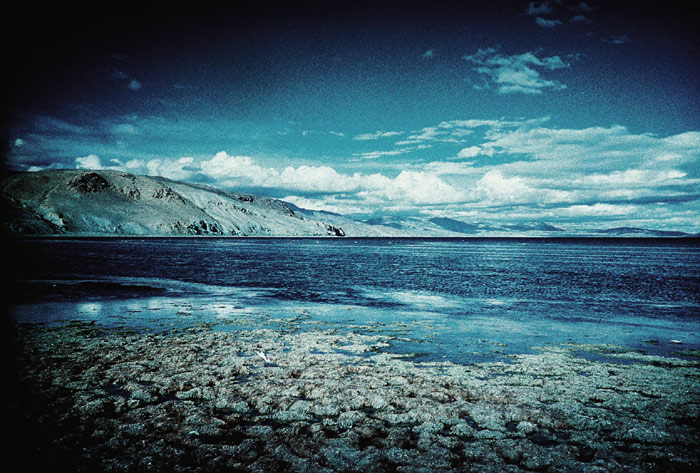
Lake Manasarovar

Some historians believe that Tegla kar (Lying Tiger fort) near Purang was built during the Zhangzhung dynasty which was conquered by the Tibetan King Songtsen Gampo in the early 7th century CE. It became the main fort of the Purang Kingdom, in the 10th century under King Kori, one of the two sons of Tashi Gon, who was king of the Guge Kingdom. The Guge and Purang kingdoms were separated during the late 11th century, when King Logtsha Tsensong founded an independent realm. In about 1330 the 13th King Sonam De took over the important Khasa Kingdom in western Nepal on the extinction of the local dynasty. The dynasty of Purang kings died out shortly before 1376. The territory was subsequently dominated in turns by the neighbouring kingdoms Guge and Mustang. region. region. During Dogra-Tibetan War, General Zorawar Singh had captured Purang and Zanda County, in order to create a land border with the Kingdom of Nepal.

Ali Sher Khan Anchan the most powerful king, fifteenth in the kings of the Maqpon Dynasty of Baltistan, conquered Ladakh and Western Tibet up to Purang in the east and Gilgit and Chitral in the west during his reign (1590–1625 AD).

== Economy ==
In 2010, the county reported a GDP of 140 million Renminbi, fiscal revenue of 4.27 million Renminbi, and retail sales totaling 26.97 million Renminbi.

Purang is an important barley-growing region and traditionally barley and salt from the salt lakes to the north of Taklakot made up the bulk of the trade to the south, while rice and a wide range of luxuries were traded back into Tibet from Nepal. The local villagers (known as Purangpa) carried the produce across the ranges into Nepal on caravans of sheep and goats during the summer and autumn. Sheep and goats are fitted with double packs which can carry up to 30 kg (70 lb) of barley or salt on the 3 week journey to the terai or low-lands of Nepal. In winter and early spring the region is often in total isolation, cut off by heavy snow falls.

== Transport ==
China National Highway 219 passes through the county. The county is also served by Ngari Burang Airport which opened in December 2023.

== Bibliography ==
- Dorje, Gyurme (1999), Footprint Tibet Handbook with Bhutan (2nd ed.), Bath: Footprint Handbooks, ISBN 0-8442-2190-2 – via archive.org
- Strachey, Henry (1854), Physical Geography of Western Tibet, London: William Clows and Sons – via archive.org
