= Purang Town =

Purang: སྤུ་ཧྲེང་གྲོང་བརྡལ; 普兰镇; Pulan, Burang, Taklakot
- Town
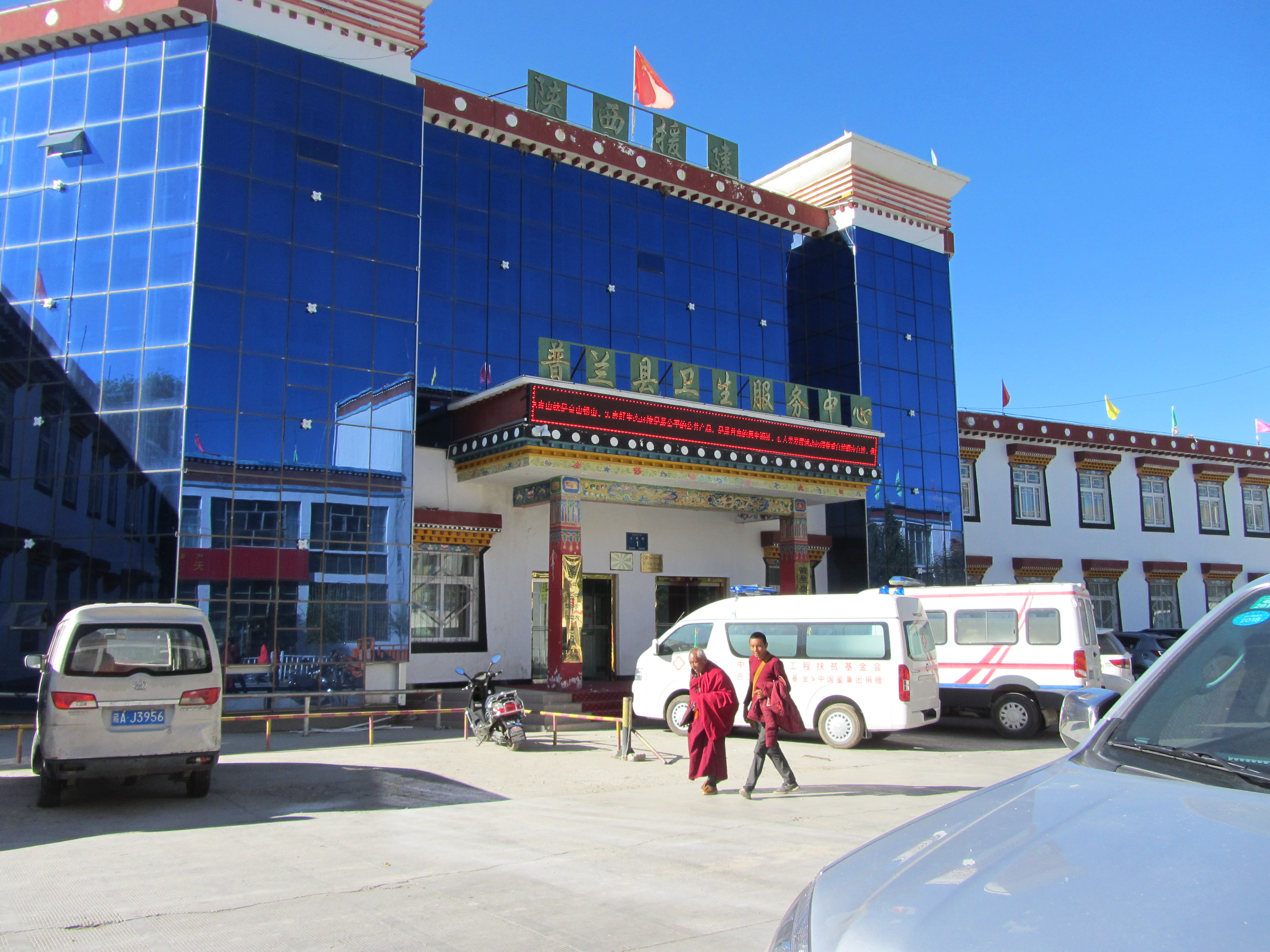
- Purang County Health Service Center located in Purang Town
- Interactive map of Purang
- Location within Tibet Autonomous Region
- Coordinates (Purang Town government): 30°17′10″N 81°10′37″E
- Country: People's Republic of China
- Autonomous region: Tibet
- Prefecture: Ngari
- County: Purang

Area
  - Total: 3,257.81 km^{2} (1,257.85 sq mi)
- Elevation: 3,900 m (12,800 ft)

Population (2010)
  - Total: 6,047
  - Density: 1.856/km^{2} (4.807/sq mi)
  - Major Nationalities: Tibetan
  - Regional dialect: Tibetan language
- Time zone: UTC+8 (CST)

Purang Town

Chinese name
- Simplified Chinese: 普兰镇
- Traditional Chinese: 普蘭鎮
Transcriptions
Standard Mandarin
- Hanyu Pinyin: Pǔlán Zhèn
Yue: Cantonese
- Jyutping: pou^{2}laan^{4} jyun^{2}

Tibetan name
- Tibetan: སྤུ་ཧྲེང་གྲོང་བརྡལ
Transcriptions
- Wylie: spu hreng grong rdal
- Tibetan Pinyin: Burang Chongdai

Purang or Burang (Tibetan: སྤུ་ཧྲེང་གྲོང་བརྡལ, Wylie: spu hreng grong rdal, THL: pu hreng drong del, Chinese: 普兰镇), also known as Taklakot, is a town which serves as the administrative center of Purang County, Ngari Prefecture of the Tibet Autonomous Region (TAR), China. The town lies at an altitude of 3,900 m (12,800 ft) in the valley of the Karnali River. The town spans an area of 3,257.81 square kilometres (1,257.85 sq mi), and has a permanent population 6,047 as of 2010, and a hukou population of 4,477 as of 2018. To the south are Gurla Mandhata (Mount Namonanyi) and the Abi Gamin ranges. Lake Manasarovar and Mount Kailash are to the north. This region is the mythological and actual river nexus of the Himalaya with sources of the Indus, Ganges and Yarlung Tsangpo/Brahmaputra all within 110 kilometres (70 mi) of Purang.

== Etymology ==
The Tibetan name of the town (spu hreng) is a corruption of the Zhang-zhung words pu hrang, meaning 'horse head'. Nepalese and Indians call the town Taklakot from Tibetan 'Takla Khar' (Tibetan: སྟག་ལ་མཁར།, Wylie: stag la mkhar, THL: Takla Khar). Takla Khar means Tiger Hill Castle, which is the name of a historic Zhang-zhung fortress in the county.

Saryu Karnali River's Peacock Mouth source is glaciers on the northern slopes of the Himalaya 50 kilometres (30 mi) NW of Purang. The Lion Mouth source of the Indus is 20 kilometres (12 mi) east of Mount Kailash and the Elephant Mouth is the source of the Sutlej. Lake Manasarovar is just 2 km from few of the Sarayu heads, and has an ephemeral connection to Rakshastal. The Horse Mouth source of the Yarlung Tsanpo (Brahmaputra) is about 90 km. (55 mi.) SE of Lake Manasarovar.

== History and religion ==
Taklakot (Purang) developed along traditional trans-Himalayan routes connecting western Tibet with regions of present-day India and Nepal. Its location made it a notable point for regional trade, travel and pilgrimage, particularly on routes leading to Mount Kailash and Lake Manasarovar. These routes historically connected Taklakot with communities across the neighbouring Himalayan regions.

Purang is an ancient trading post. Indian and Nepali communities residing in the mountainous parts of India and Nepal bordering the Purang county have for many generations conducted trade with Tibetan communities at Purang. But the conditions under which this trade presently happens are significantly different from those prevailing before the mid-twentieth century. The government of Nepal issues special border area passes to its citizens who are bona-fide residents of the border district of Humla, which enables them to seek seasonal work in Purang.

On a cliff above the town was the large ancient fort of Tegla Kar (Lying Tiger Fort) and Simbiling Monastery (both totally destroyed in 1967 by Chinese artillery during the Cultural Revolution, but the monastery has since been partially restored). Beneath them is the Tsegu Gompa or the "Nine-Storey Monastery" which was probably originally a Bön establishment. Tsegu covers many terraces and may be reached by ladders, and contains many unique and ancient wall-painting, darkened from centuries of smoke. It seems that the Tegla kar (Lying Tiger fort) was built during the Zhangzhung dynasty which was conquered by the Tibetan king Songtsen Gampo in the early 7th century CE. It became the main fort of the Purang Kingdom, in the 10th century under King Kori, one of the two sons of Tashi Gon, King of the Guge Kingdom. The Purang kingdom is believed to have ended in the 15th century. In addition, Purang is said to be the place where Sudhana, a previous incarnation of the Buddha, lived.

Purang is the gateway town for travel to Mount Kailash and Lake Manasarovar to the north. These are important destinations for Bon, Buddhist, Hindu, Jain and even New Age pilgrims. Traditional cosmology designates Mount Kailash the center of the universe. Great religious merit is attributed to parikrama around the mountain, and to bathing in Lake Manasarovar.

== Administrative divisions ==
The town is divided into six village-level divisions:

- Kyitang/Jirang Community (Tibetan: སྐྱིད་ཐང, Chinese: 吉让社区)
- Toyo/Doyou (Tibetan: སྟོད་ཡོད, Chinese: 多油村)
- Rikug/Rengong (Tibetan: རི་ཁུག, Chinese: 仁贡村)
- Zhidé/Xide (Tibetan: ཞི་བདེ།, Chinese: 西德村)
- Khorchak/Kejia (Tibetan: འཁོར་ཆགས, Chinese: 科迦村), and
- Tridé/Chide (Tibetan: ཁྲི་སྡེ, Chinese: 赤德村)

The town's government is seated in the Jirang Neighborhood Committee.

== Demographics ==
As of 2018, the town has a hukou population of 4,477.

Per the 2010 Chinese Census, the town has a permanent population of 6,047, up from 5,026 in the 2000 Chinese Census.

A 1996 estimate placed the town's population at 4,700.

== Transport ==
=== Air ===
Ali Pulan Airport opened in December 2023 and is a dual-use military-civilian airport that serves the town.

=== Road ===
National Road S207 starts in Purang, heading NE 65 kilometres (40 mi) past Lake Rakshastal and Manasarovar to China National Highway 219.

=== Border crossings ===
Purang is near the borders with India and Nepal. A road leads some 56 kilometres (35 mi) down the Karnali River to the border crossing at the village of Xie'erwa (Tibetan: Sher) into Hilsa in Nepal (Humla District, Karnali Zone) where a historic trail and now a rough motor road continuing to Simikot. There is also a border crossing into India (Pithoragarh district, Uttarakhand State) over Lipulekh Pass.

== Geography and climate ==
Purang has a cold arid climate (Köppen BWk), with long, cold winters and mild summers. The normal monthly mean temperature ranges from −7.6 °C (18.3 °F) in January to 14.4 °C (57.9 °F) in July, and the annual mean is 3.64 °C (38.6 °F). Annual precipitation is only around 150 mm (5.9 in).

Climate data for Burang, 3,900 m (12,795 ft) amsl (1981−2010 normals)
Month	Jan	Feb	Mar	Apr	May	Jun	Jul	Aug	Sep	Oct	Nov	Dec	Year
Mean daily maximum °C (°F)	0.2 (32.4)	1.2 (34.2)	5.2 (41.4)	10.1 (50.2)	14.9 (58.8)	19.2 (66.6)	21.3 (70.3)	20.7 (69.3)	17.9 (64.2)	12.2 (54.0)	7.7 (45.9)	3.6 (38.5)	11.2 (52.2)
Daily mean °C (°F)	−7.6 (18.3)	−6.2 (20.8)	−2.0 (28.4)	2.9 (37.2)	7.6 (45.7)	12.1 (53.8)	14.4 (57.9)	13.9 (57.0)	10.8 (51.4)	4.1 (39.4)	−1.1 (30.0)	−5.2 (22.6)	3.6 (38.5)
Mean daily minimum °C (°F)	−14.2 (6.4)	−12.8 (9.0)	−8.4 (16.9)	−3.2 (26.2)	1.3 (34.3)	5.9 (42.6)	8.8 (47.8)	8.4 (47.1)	4.7 (40.5)	−2.7 (27.1)	−8.2 (17.2)	−12.1 (10.2)	−2.7 (27.1)
Average precipitation mm (inches)	9.5 (0.37)	12.4 (0.49)	20.3 (0.80)	12.5 (0.49)	11.1 (0.44)	7.1 (0.28)	20.8 (0.82)	24.4 (0.96)	14.3 (0.56)	8.6 (0.34)	4.0 (0.16)	5.5 (0.22)	150.5 (5.93)
Average relative humidity (%)	42	46	47	46	47	51	59	61	56	43	35	35	47
Source: China Meteorological Administration

== Bibliography ==
- Dorje, Gyurme (1999), Footprint Tibet Handbook with Bhutan (2nd ed.), Bath: Footprint Handbooks, ISBN 0-8442-2190-2 – via archive.org
- Strachey, Henry (1854), Physical Geography of Western Tibet, London: William Clows and Sons – via archive.org
