= Arnold Henry Savage Landor =

English painter, explorer, writer, and anthropologist

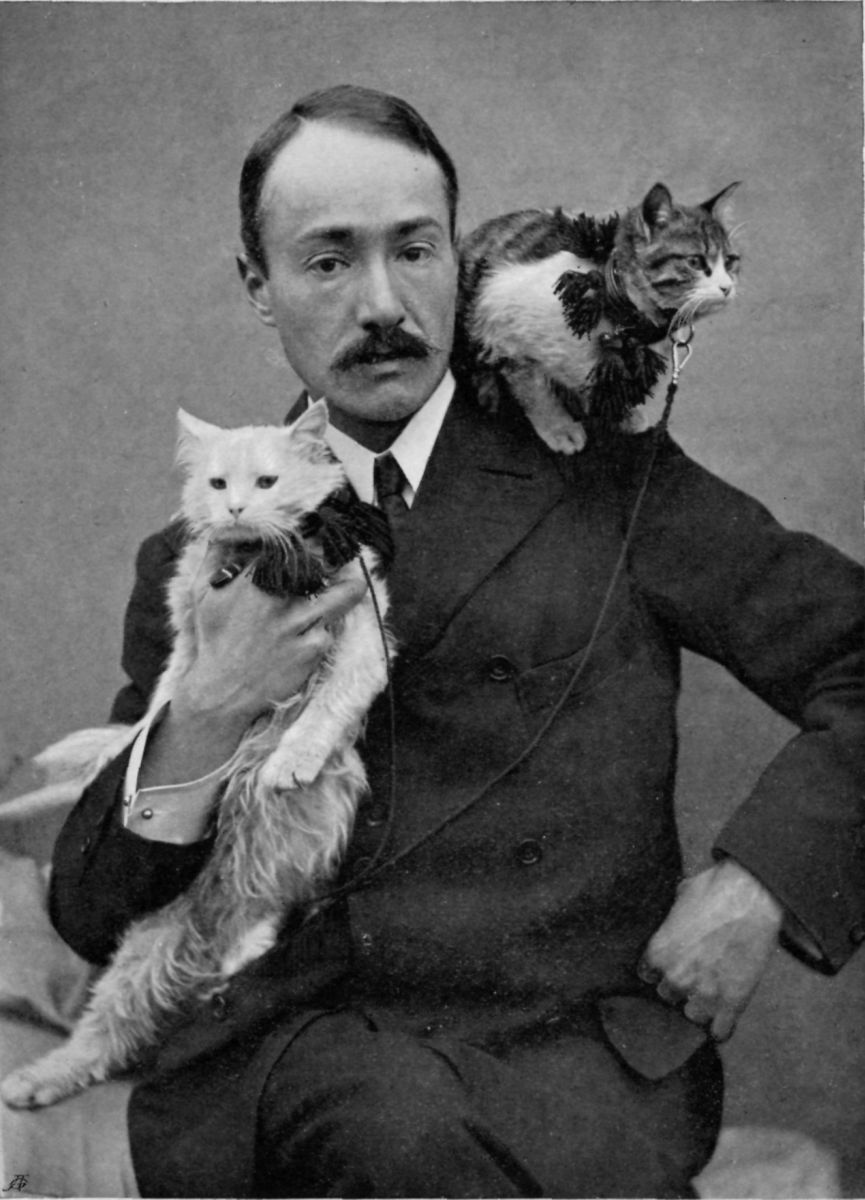
- Arnold Henry Savage Landor, with Persian kittens Kerman and Zeris, with whom he travelled in Across Coveted Lands
- Born: 2 June 1865; Florence, Italy
- Died: 26 December 1924 (aged 59); Florence, Italy
- Occupations: painter, explorer, writer, anthropologist

Signature
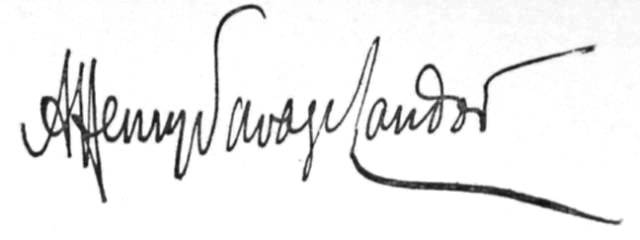

Arnold Henry Savage Landor (2 June 1865 – 26 December 1924) was an English painter, explorer, writer, and anthropologist.

== Life and career ==
Arnold H. S. Landor was born to Charles Savage Landor in Florence, Italy, where he spent his childhood. The writer Walter Savage Landor was his grandfather.

He left for Paris at age fifteen to study at the Académie Julian directed by Gustave Boulanger and Jules Lefebvre. He then travelled the world, including America, Japan, and Korea, painting many landscapes and portraits. His 1895 travel memoirs from Korea included accounts of appointments to portray two Princes of the ruling Min clan, each of whom received him more graciously than they had the British consul. The gifts from one of his sitters included a white leopard skin and a set of screens that were of especial rarity. Upon his return to England, he was invited to Balmoral by Queen Victoria to recount his adventures and show his drawings. He later travelled to Nepal and Tibet, telling of his experiences in two books: In the Forbidden Land (1898) and Tibet and Nepal (1905).

When he learned about the Boxer Rebellion in China he went to Peking (now spelled Beijing) to join the victory parade, afterward writing China and the Allies (1901). In 1901 he travelled from Russia to India, riding on horseback through Persia, publishing the account of that journey in the book Across Coveted Lands (1902). A journey to the Philippine Islands resulted in another book: The Gems of the East (1904).

During the 1900s he visited Abyssinia and painted a portrait of the king Menelik II. Landor's book Across Widest Africa was published in 1906. During 1911 and 1912 he made an eventful expedition to the Mato Grosso in Brazil and in 1913 published Across Unknown South America.

He had an active role in World War I, designing tanks and airships. Eventually, he retired to write his autobiography in Florence, where he died in 1924.

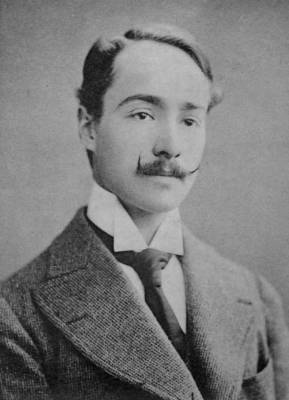
Portrait appearing in 1895 travel memoirs by Savage-Landor who visited Korea not long after its opening to Western trade.

He is buried in the English Cemetery, Florence.

== Works ==
- Alone with the Hairy Ainu (1893).
- Corea or Cho-sen (1895)
- In the Forbidden Land (1898).
- China and the Allies (1901).
- Across Coveted Lands (1902). VOL I. VOL II.
- The Gems of the East (1904).
- Tibet and Nepal (1905).
- The Living Races of Mankind (1905).
- Across Widest Africa (1907).
- An Explorer's Adventures in Tibet (1910).
- Across Unknown South America (1913).
- Everywhere, the Memoirs of an Explorer (1924).

== Gallery ==
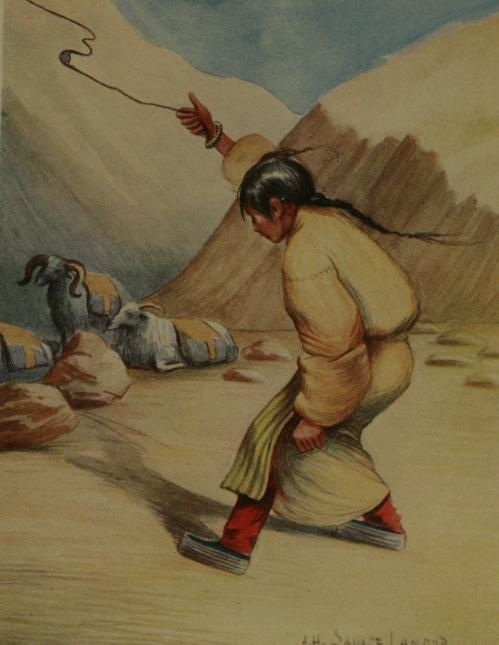
Tibetan Girl Using a Sling by Savage-Landor

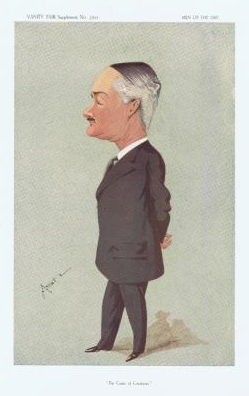
Caricature of Savage-Landor by "Astz" in the magazine Vanity Fair, 1913

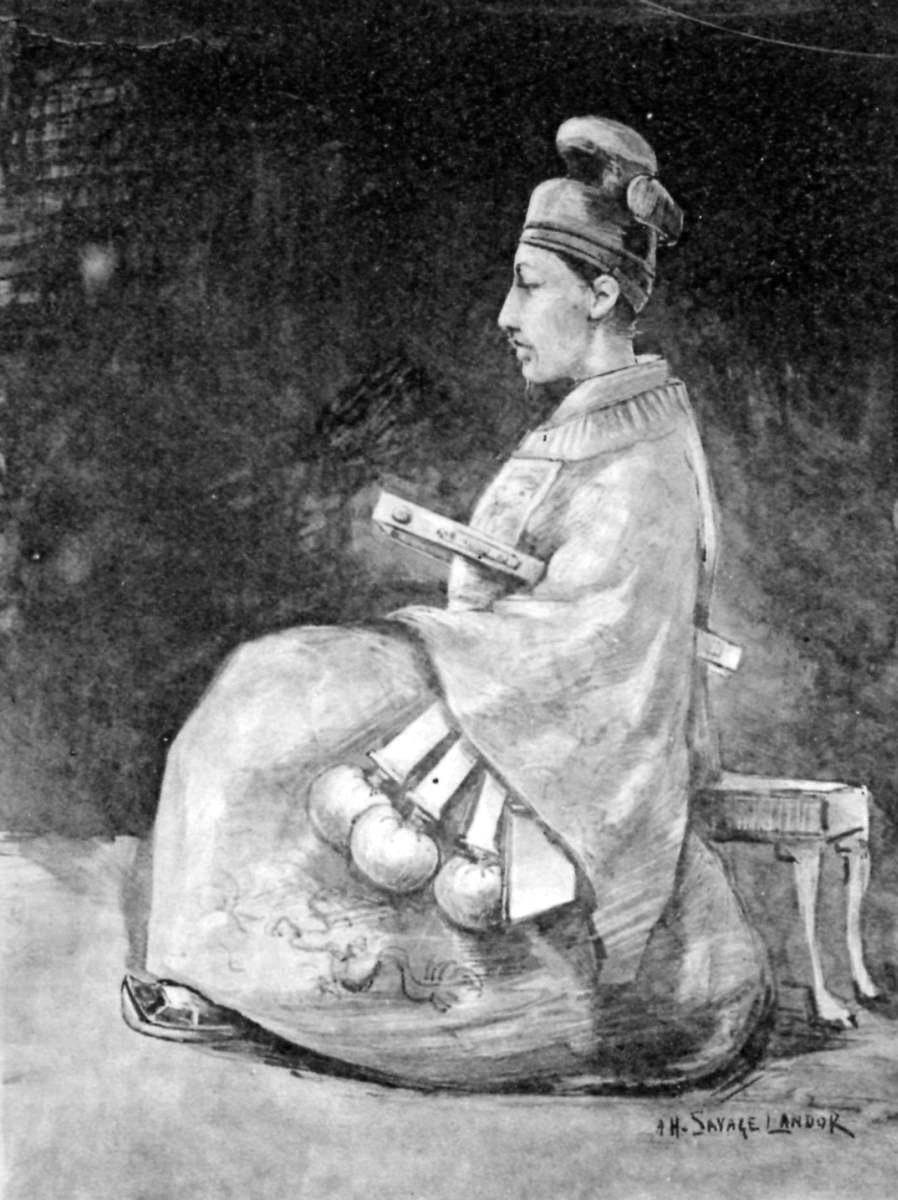
Sketch portrait of Prince Min-Young-Huan of Korea (published 1895), who gifted to Savage-Landor a variety of animals and objects in exchange, including a snow leopard skin and some wooden screens that he brought back to England.
