= Burton Stein =

American historian (1926–1996)

Burton Stein (1926 – April 26, 1996) was an American historian, whose area of specialization was India.

== Life and career ==
Stein was born and grew up in Chicago, Illinois and served in the Second World War, before commencing tertiary study at the now disused Navy Pier facility that in 1945 was the Chicago campus of the University of Illinois. Stein was an unusual case in that he never completed a bachelor's degree. He was admitted directly into a Master of Arts program at the University of Chicago, finishing his masters in 1954 under the supervision of Robert Crane. He wrote his Ph.D. dissertation in 1957 on the economic functions of South India's medieval Tirupati temple.

Upon the completion of his PhD, Stein was appointed to a teaching post at the University of Minnesota, where he stayed until the end of 1965. He then married the author Dorothy Stein and moved to the University of Hawaii where he stayed for 17 years until 1983. He held visiting professorships at the University of Chicago, University of Pennsylvania, University of Washington, University of California, Berkeley and the Centre for Historical Studies of Jawaharlal Nehru University. He moved to London serving as a Professorial Research Associate of the School of Oriental and African Studies at the University of London.

Stein was known for his wide-ranging participation in seminars and other South Asian scholarly work. He continued to write prolifically in his retirement and continued to spend significant amounts of time consulting with students and other scholars. He was known for his dry sense of humour and usually responded to student questioning by posing counterquestions.

== Research ==
Stein's contributions as a research scholar was mainly focused on premodern and colonial South India. He spent the early 1960s formulating a hypothesis about the nature of "state" in South India. He was skeptical of the existence of a system of bureaucracy in the Chola Dynasty. He delved into the theory of tribal society and referred to the work of Aidan Southall, "The Illusion of Tribe". He published his first book, Peasant, State and Society in Medieval South India (1980) with the theme of segmentary lineage.

In retirement, Burt's writing productivity increased over time, with four more books written and a fifth, A History of India, published posthumously in 1998, after being left largely complete. A second, slightly revised, edition was published in 2010, with a chapter added to bring the narrative further forward.

Stein and Jan Broek, a colleague from Minnesota, first devised the idea of a historical atlas of South Asia, and enlisted the backing of Charles Leslie Ames to establish a fellowship in historical cartography of the Indian subcontinent. Under the leadership of Joseph E. Schwartzberg, the work on the atlas began in the mid-1960s. Stein was an active advisor on the project, which resulted in the publications of A Historical Atlas of South Asia, published by the University of Chicago Press in 1978.

== Works ==
Books

- 1980: Peasant state and society in medieval South India. Oxford University Press. 1994. ISBN 9780195635072.
- 1989: Thomas Munro: The origins of the colonial state and his vision of empire. Oxford University Press. 1989. ISBN 9780195623314.
- 1989: Vijayanagara. The New Cambridge History of India. Cambridge University Press. 1989. ISBN 978-0-521-26693-2.
- 1998: A History of India. Wiley. 16 June 1998. ISBN 978-0-631-20546-3.; 2010: Second edition revised by David Arnold, ISBN 978-1-4443-2351-1

Selected articles

- 1960: Stein, Burton (1960). The Economic Function of a Medieval South Indian Temple. The Journal of Asian Studies, 19(2), 163–176. https://doi.org/10.2307/2943547.
- 1977: Stein, Burton (1977). Circulation and the Historical Geography of Tamil Country. The Journal of Asian Studies, 37(1), 7–26. https://doi.org/10.2307/2053325.
- 1985: Stein, Burton (1985). "Notes on 'Peasant Insurgency' in Colonial Mysore: Event and Process". South Asia Research. 5 (1): 11–27. doi:10.1177/026272808500500102. S2CID 143808036.
- 1985: Stein, Burton (1985). "State Formation and Economy Reconsidered: Part One". Modern Asian Studies. 19 (3, Special Issue: Papers Presented at the Conference on Indian Economic and Social History, Cambridge University, April 1984): 387–413. doi:10.1017/S0026749X00007678. JSTOR 312446. S2CID 154665616.
- 1991: Stein, Burton (1991). Towards an Indian Petty Bourgeoisie: Outline of an Approach. Economic and Political Weekly, 26(4), PE9–PE20. http://www.jstor.org/stable/4397240.
- 1993: Stein, Burton (1993). City and State in Late Precolonial Madras. Studies in the History of Art, 31, 209–218. http://www.jstor.org/stable/42620480.
