= Tabula Rogeriana =

Medieval map

Nuzhat al-mushtāq fī ikhtirāq al-āfāq (نزهة المشتاق في اختراق الآفاق) Tabula Rogeriana
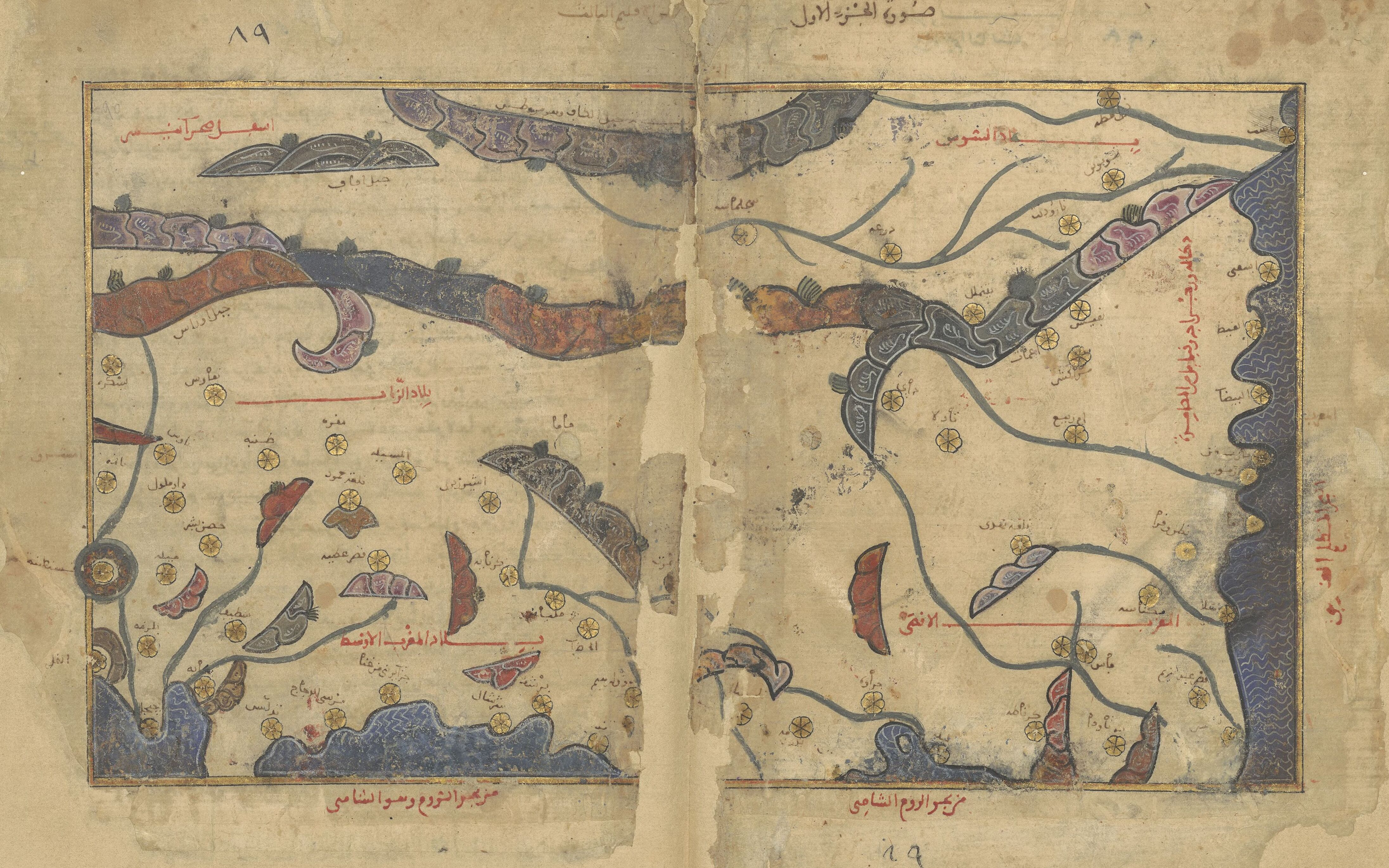
- Map of al-Maghrib al-Aqsa and al-Maghrib al-Awsat (south-up) in MS arabe 2221, the oldest known surviving manuscript copy of Idrisi's Tabula Rogeriana.
- Author: Muhammad al-Idrisi
- Media type: Atlas

The Nuzhat al-mushtāq fī ikhtirāq al-āfāq (Arabic: نزهة المشتاق في اختراق الآفاق, lit. "The Excursion of One Eager to Penetrate the Distant Horizons"), commonly known in the West as the Tabula Rogeriana (lit. "The Book of Roger" in Latin), is an atlas commissioned by the Norman King Roger II in 1138 and completed by the Moroccan geographer Muhammad al-Idrisi in 1154. The atlas compiles 70 maps of the known world with associated descriptions and commentary of each specific location by Al-Idrisi.

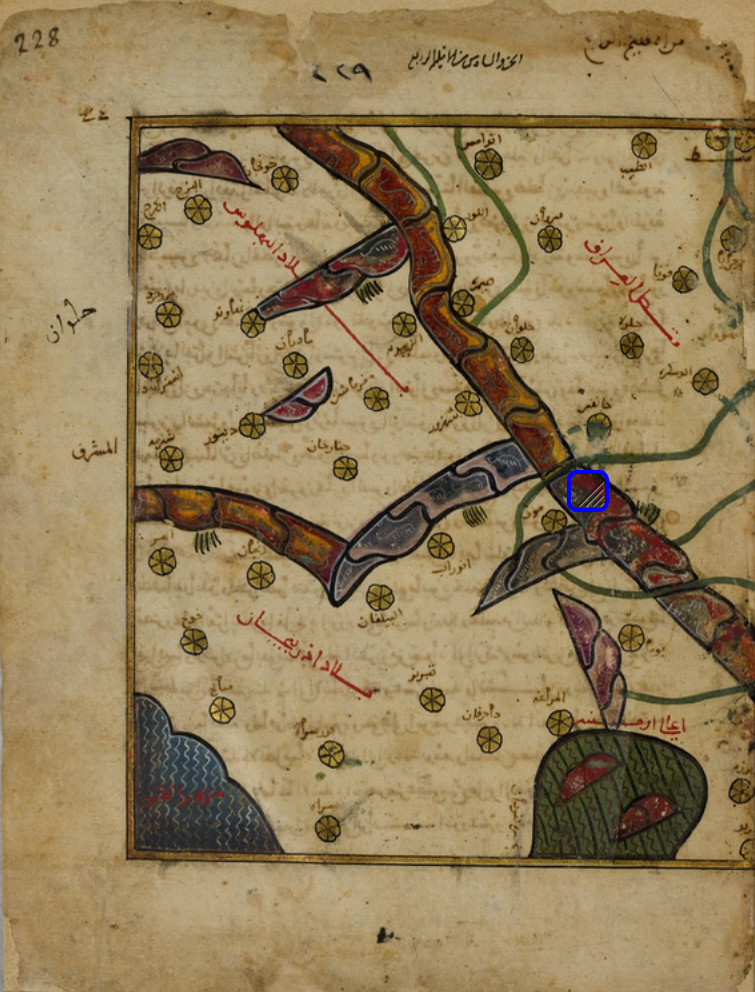
Armenia is shown in the bottom center, Azerbaijan in the lower left corner, and West Central Iran in upper left and a small portion of the Caspian Sea at the bottom left, with the Zagros Mountains at the bottom. Sixth section of the fourth clime from the oldest extant manuscript of al-Idrisi's Nuzhat al-mushtaq, copied c. 1300.

== Creation of the Atlas ==
Around 1138, the Norman King of Sicily, Roger II, invited Al-Idrisi, a Muslim geographer, to his court in Palermo, in search of help pursuing his political agenda. Sicily's vibrant multicultural environment led al-Idrisi to accept King Roger's invitation to his court. During the meeting, Al-Idrisi briefed Roger II on his familiarity and personal experiences traveling around North Africa and Western Europe, which prompted Roger II to commission an atlas from Al-Idrisi. To produce the work, Al-Idrisi started gathering information for the maps by interviewing experienced travelers on their knowledge of the world, keeping "only that part... on which there was complete agreement and seemed credible, excluding what was contradictory." King Roger II would occasionally participate in these interviews himself, reflecting his desire to compile information about his realm. Al-Idrisi drew inspiration from a number of sources, most of which are dated to the Golden Age of Islam during the Abbasid Caliphate, when scholarly work was flourishing in the Islamic world. Additionally, Al-Idrisi would send out agents to the different parts of the world represented in his map to fact-check the information given by the travelers.

Al-Idrisi's work was a significant departure from the "Atlas of Islam" tradition that preceded his work. The primary influence for Al-Idrisi's cartography can be found in Arabic translations of Ptolemy's Geography, which laid out many of the principles he utilized in his work. Al-Idrisi also derived map-making methods from the Balkhi school of Geography, a school which was founded during the 10th century in Baghdad under the Abbasid Caliphate. It was from this school that he drew the scientifically rigorous and anthropologically detailed information that he incorporated into the atlas' creation. He also used some instruments King Roger II created to help calculate latitudes and longitudes. This research process ultimately took some 15 years.

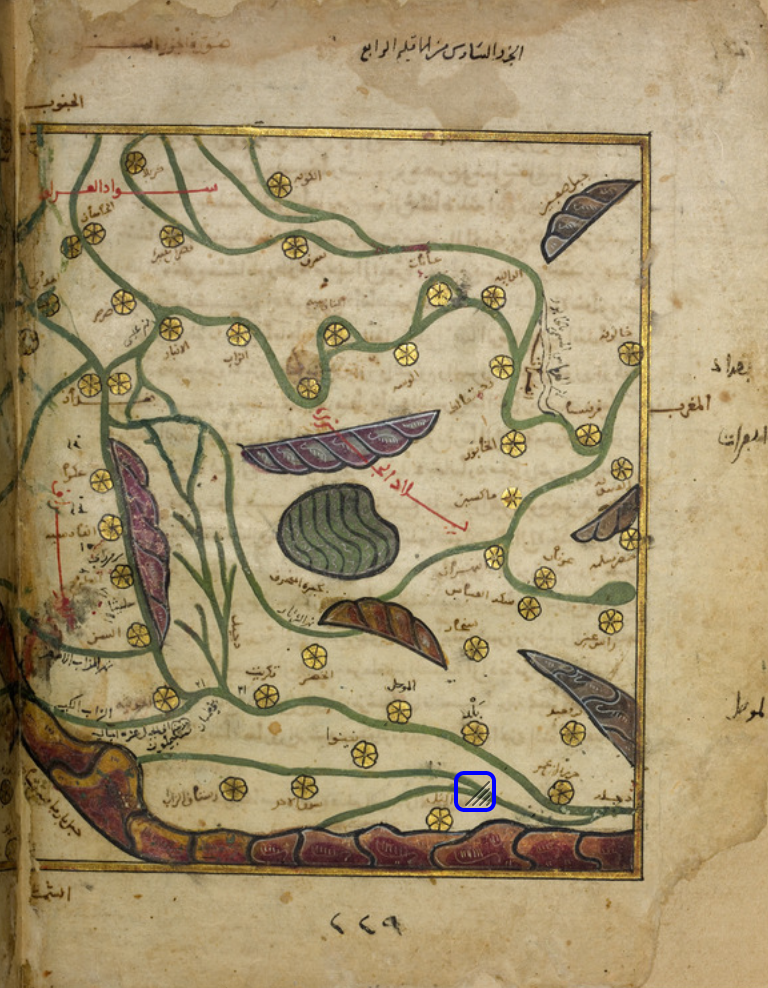
Showing upper Mesopotamia. Sixth section of the fourth clime from the oldest extant manuscript of al-Idrisi's Nuzhat al-mushtaq, copied c. 1300.

In 1154, just a few weeks before the king died, Al-Idrisi completed his atlas, producing a book with 70 sectional maps and a 300 lb (140 kg) silver disc engraved with the composite world map they formed. This would become known as the Nuzhat al-mushtaq fikhtiraq al-afaq, as well as the Book of Roger. This disc was made in accordance with Al-Idrisi's calculations of the circumference of the earth, and would lead to the later creation of a silver globe with the same map engraved on it.

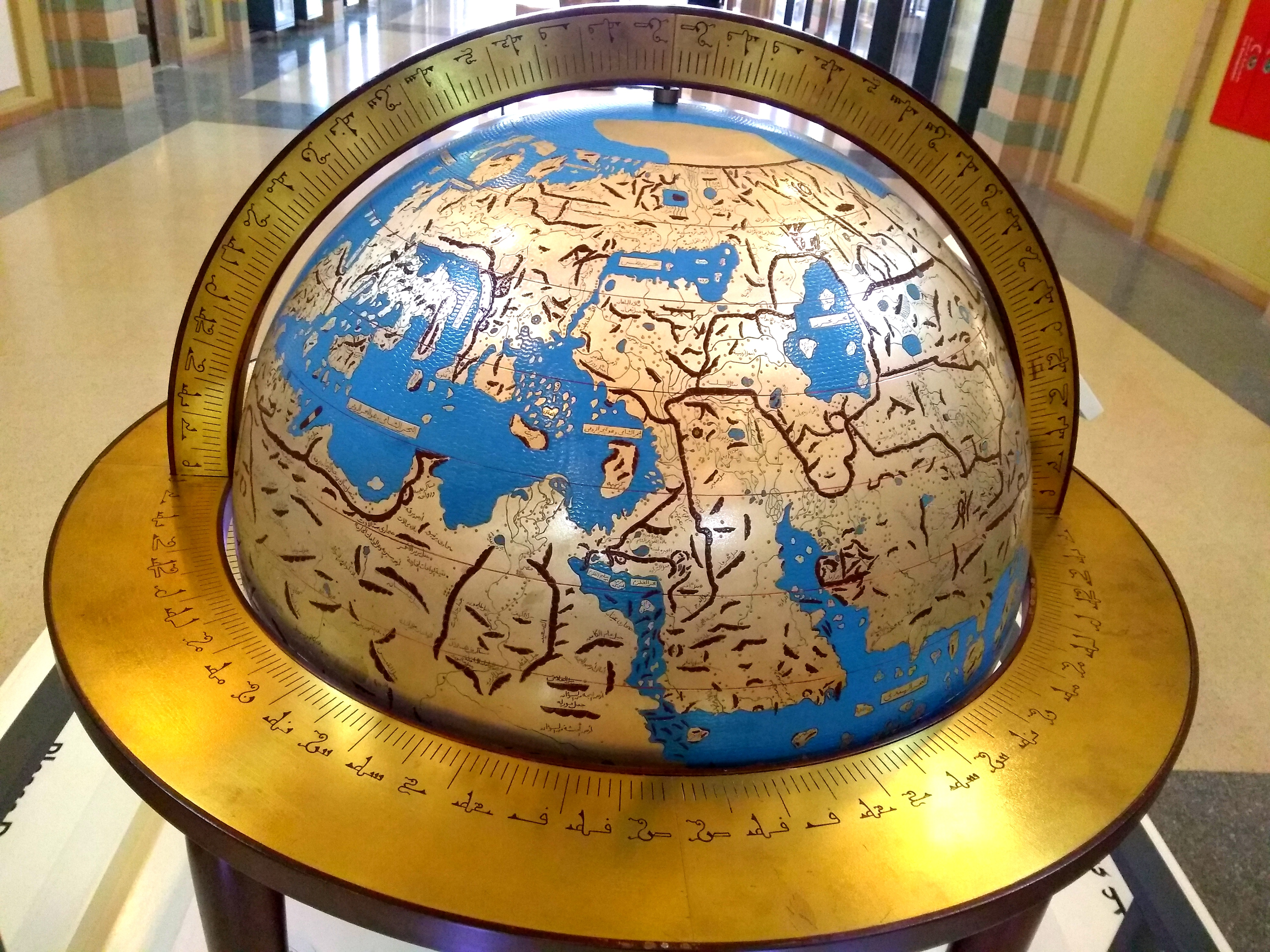
Reproduction of al-Idrisi's planisphere (as a globe) by the Sharjah Museum of Islamic Civilization.

== Description ==
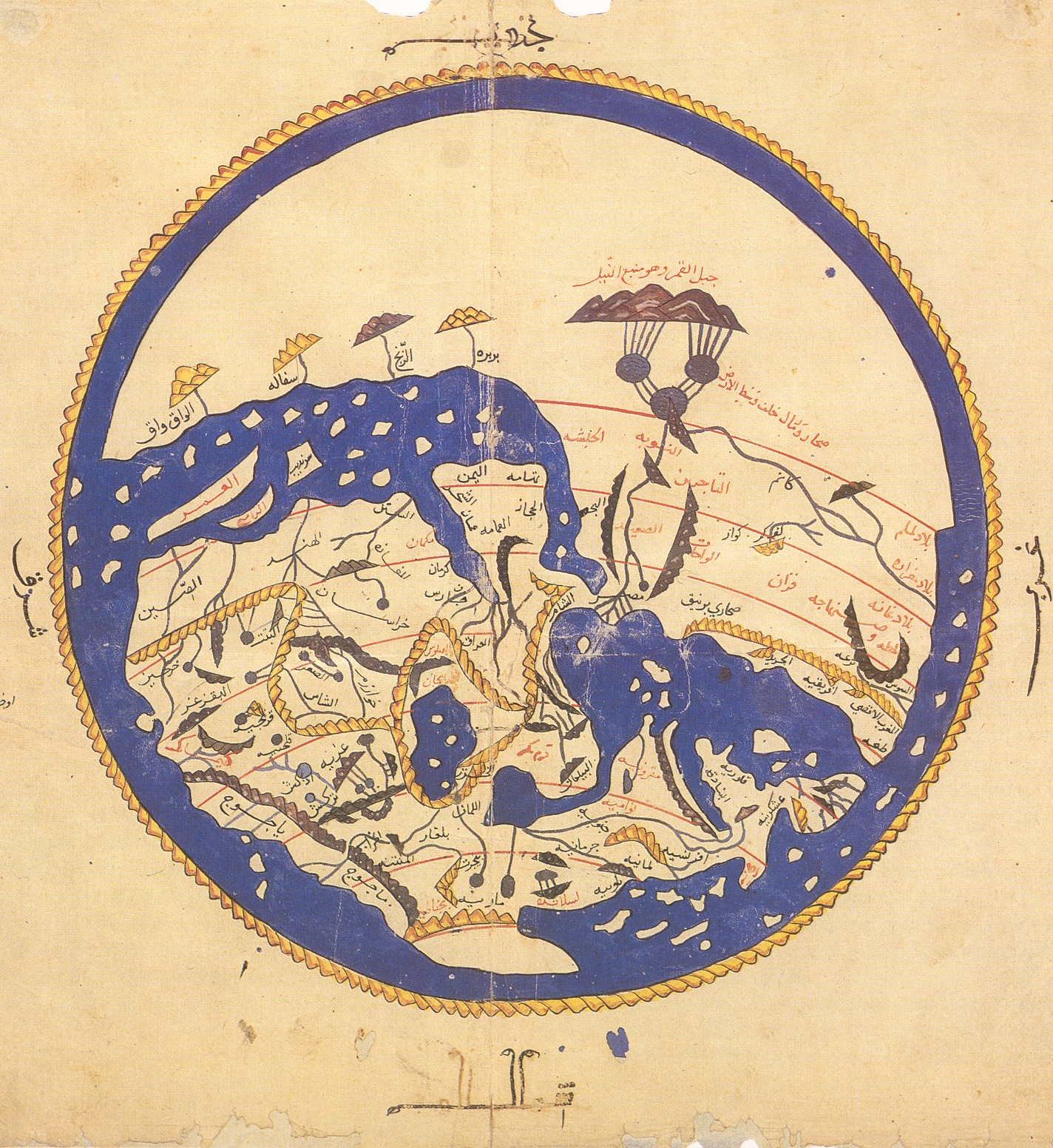
Al-Idrisi's world map from 'Ali ibn Hasan al-Hufi al-Qasimi's 1456 copy. This is an example of the circular world maps inserted into the manuscript in later editions.

The book, written in Arabic, is divided into seven "climatic zones" (in keeping with the established Ptolemaic system), each of which is subdivided into ten sections. Each section is given its two-page spread map, for a total of 70 maps. The maps are oriented with North at the bottom, South at the top, with Mecca in the middle. Each map was organized according to a coordinate system that, while inaccurate by modern standards, nonetheless ensured a level of rigor and consistency in scale from map to map. Al-Idrisi added pages of commentary following each map he produced. The text incorporates descriptions of the physical, cultural, political, and socioeconomic conditions of each region. This information was largely accurate, with inconsistencies being attributable to flawed accounts from the travelers interviewed.

The map and its details also convey the original intention of the map's patron. Areas in North Africa and Europe that were closer to Roger II's kingdom had more accurate information, while further areas such as Southeast Asia were less detailed. This reflects Roger II's desire to learn more about his domain and its surrounding areas, as well as Al-Idrisi's greater personal experience with these lands. The work showed, in al-Idrisi's words, "the seven climatic regions, with their respective countries and districts, coasts and lands, gulfs and seas, watercourses and river mouths".

It calculated the circumference to be 37,000 kilometres (23,000 mi) – an error of less than 10 percent – and it hinted at the concept of gravity. The different maps, when compiled together, made a rectangular map of the known world. In later editions, a smaller circular world map in which the south was drawn at the top and Mecca at the center was added to the manuscript. Al-Idrisi's book came to be known as Kitab Rujar (Roger's Book). The original atlas and silver disc was destroyed in a rebellion headed by Matthew Bonnellus in 1160.

The manuscript enjoyed wide popularity and use throughout the world. The medieval scholar Gabriel Sionita translated the book into Latin and printed it in Paris in 1619. The book was also translated into Spanish, German, Russian, Finnish, French, Italian, and Swedish. A total of 10 copies remain in various conditions, 5 of which are complete manuscripts. Two of these are currently stored at the Bibliothèque Nationale de France including the oldest known copy, produced around 1325 and cataloged as MS Arabe 2221. The discrepancies found between manuscripts from different locations are owed to the fact that al-Idrisi left multiple different drafts for the original work. Another copy, made in Cairo in 1553, is in the Bodleian Library in Oxford (Mss. Pococke 375). It was acquired in 1692. The most complete manuscript, which includes the world map and all 70 sectional maps, is kept in Istanbul.

Additionally, al-Idrisi created an abbreviated version of the book for Roger II's son, William II. This book, known as the "Little Idrisi," is still extant in multiple copies, and informs much of what scholars know today of al-Idrisi's original, extended work.

== Significance ==
This set of maps was profoundly influential for centuries to come. Many contemporary scholars hailed it as the greatest work of geography of the period. Moreover, the atlas influenced later geographical works with its techniques, inspiring maps with similar levels of precision.

Additionally, Al-Idrisi's maps represented a shift in the philosophy of cartography. While the coordinates used were inaccurate by modern standards, they nonetheless illustrate that map-making was principally a scientific endeavor. Unlike previous cartographers, al-Idrisi aimed to be as accurate as possible and to provide as much reliable information about the various regions of the world, especially those contained in Roger II's realm. This contrasts heavily with prior Christian maps, which were solely based on the writings of the Bible. Islamic cartographers, while generally more accurate than their Christian counterparts, were still liable to use abstraction in their mapmaking. This made al-Idrisi's map one of a kind in its scope and ambitions, applying the techniques of the Balkhi School of Geography to an unprecedented scale and including detailed descriptions of all regions that it portrayed.

In the 19th century, the manuscript experienced renewed interest and popularity with the rise of orientalism and interest in the East. Orientalists widely reprinted the book. In 1799, in Madrid, Jose Antonio Conde reprinted the section on Andalusia in its original Arabic with a Spanish translation. In 1828, Rosen Muller reprinted the section on Greater Syria and Palestine in Leipzig. In 1864, Reinhart Dozy reprinted the section containing information about Morocco, Sudan, Egypt, and Andalusia in Leon. These maps were used in a variety of activities, ranging from display to being taught and studied.

Ten manuscript copies of the Book of Roger currently survive, five of which have complete text and eight of which have maps. Two are in the Bibliothèque nationale de France, including the oldest, dated to about 1325. (MS Arabe 2221). Another copy, made in Cairo in 1553, is in the Bodleian Library in Oxford (Mss. Pococke 375). It was acquired in 1692. The most complete manuscript, which includes the world map and all seventy sectional maps, is kept in Istanbul.

Wide version of the same map

== See also ==
- Geography and cartography in medieval Islam

== Sources ==
- Ahmad, Sayyid Maqbul (1992). "Cartography of al-Sharīf al-Idrīsī" (PDF). In Harley, John Brian; Woodward, David (eds.). Cartography in the traditional Islamic and south Asian societies. The history of cartography. Vol. 2.1. Chicago: University of Chicago Press. pp. 156–174. ISBN 978-0-226-31635-2.
- Al-Fora, Uthman (1983). "Al-Sharif Al-Idrisi and His Contributions to Geography" (PDF). King Saud University, Journal of the College of Education. 5: 159–185 – via King Saud University.
- Antrim, Zayde (2018). Mapping the Middle East. London. ISBN 978-1-78023-850-0. OCLC 1004760121.
- Bacharach, Jere L. (2006). Medieval Islamic Civilization: An Encyclopedia. Routledge. ISBN 978-0-415-96690-0
- Ducne, Jean-Charles (December 1, 2011). "Les Coordonnees Geographiques De la Carte Manuscrite d'al-Idrs". Der Islam. 86 (2): 271–285.
- Ḥasan, Muḥammad ʻAbd al-Ghanī. al-Sharīf al-Īdrīsī. N.p., 1972. Print.
- Houben, Hubert (2002). Roger II of Sicily: A Ruler between East and West. Cambridge: Cambridge University. ISBN 978-0-521-65208-7.
- Editorial Board of Aljaranda (March 2016). "Travelers in Tarifa". Aljaranda. 89: 95–98 – via Dialnet.
- Library staff. "Catalog summary, The Excursion of the One Who Yearns to Penetrate the Horizons, by al-Idrisi". The Library of Congress.
- Pastuch, Carissa (2022). "Al-Idrisi's Masterpiece of Medieval Geography". Worlds Revealed, Geography & Maps at the Library of Congress.
