= Muhammad al-Idrisi =

Arab geographer (1100–1165)

- محمد الإدريسي
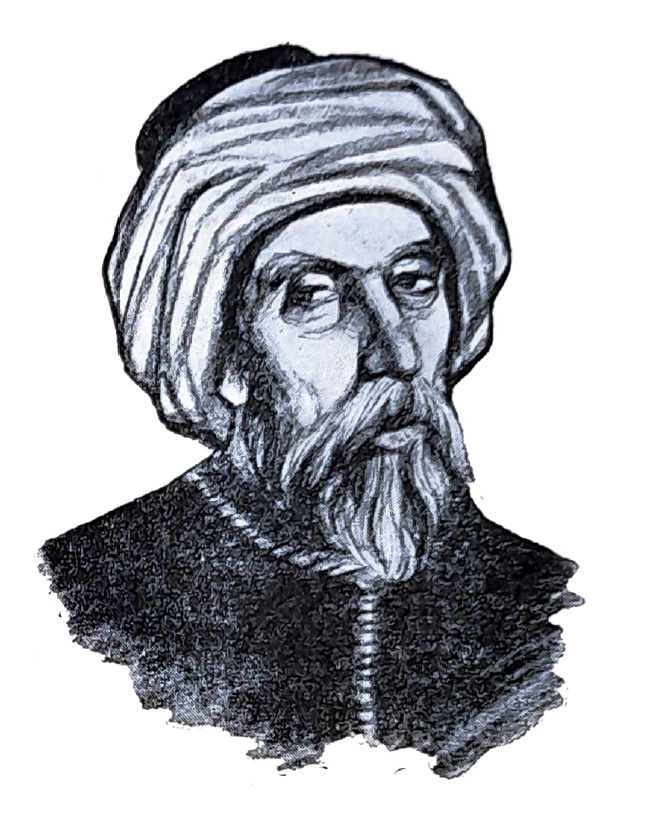
- A sketch representing Muhammad al-Idrisi from a book entitled Sayr mulhimah: min al-Sharq wa-al-Gharb by unknown author, 1961
- Born: 1100; Ceuta, Almoravid dynasty
- Died: 1165 (aged 64–65); Ceuta, Almohad Caliphate
- Known for: Tabula Rogeriana
- Scientific career
- Fields: Geographer, cartographer

Abu Abdullah Muhammad al-Idrisi al-Qurtubi al-Hasani as-Sabti, or simply al-Idrisi /ælɪˈdriːsiː/ (Arabic: أبو عبد الله محمد الإدريسي القرطبي الحسني السبتي; Latin: Dreses; 1100–1165), was an Arab Muslim geographer and cartographer who served in the court of King Roger II at Palermo, Sicily. Muhammad al-Idrisi was born in Ceuta, then belonging to the Almoravid dynasty. He created the Tabula Rogeriana, one of the most advanced medieval world maps. al-Idrisi stands as one of the most celebrated cartographers and geographical scholars from the Islamic world, exemplifying the intellectual figures who preserved and advanced the Arabic culture and traditions during the Era of the Normans in medieval Sicily.

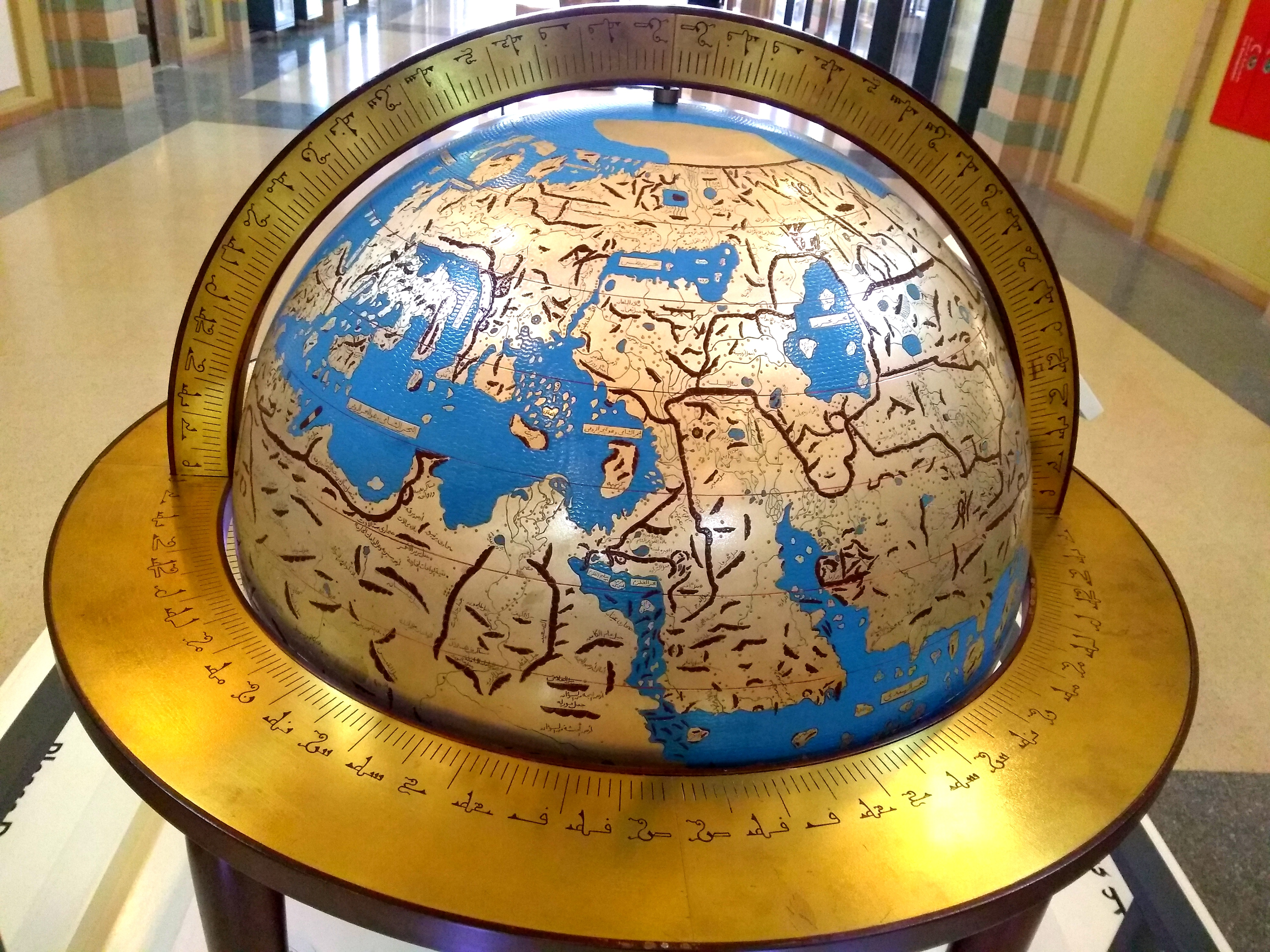
Reproduction of al-Idrisi's planisphere (as a globe) by the Sharjah Museum of Islamic Civilization (UAE).

== Early life ==
Al-Idrisi hailed from the Hammudid dynasty of North Africa and Al-Andalus, which was descended from Muhammad through the powerful Idrisid dynasty. Al-Idrisi was believed to be born in the city of Ceuta in 1100, at the time controlled by the Almoravids, where his great-grandfather had been forced to settle after the fall of Hammudid Málaga to the Zirids of Granada. He spent much of his early life travelling through North Africa and Al-Andalus (Muslim Spain and Portugal of the times) and seems to have acquired detailed information on both regions. He visited Anatolia when he was barely 16. He studied in the university in Córdoba. His travels took him to many parts of Europe including Portugal, the Pyrenees, the French Atlantic coast, Hungary, and Jórvík (now known as York).

== Tabula Rogeriana ==
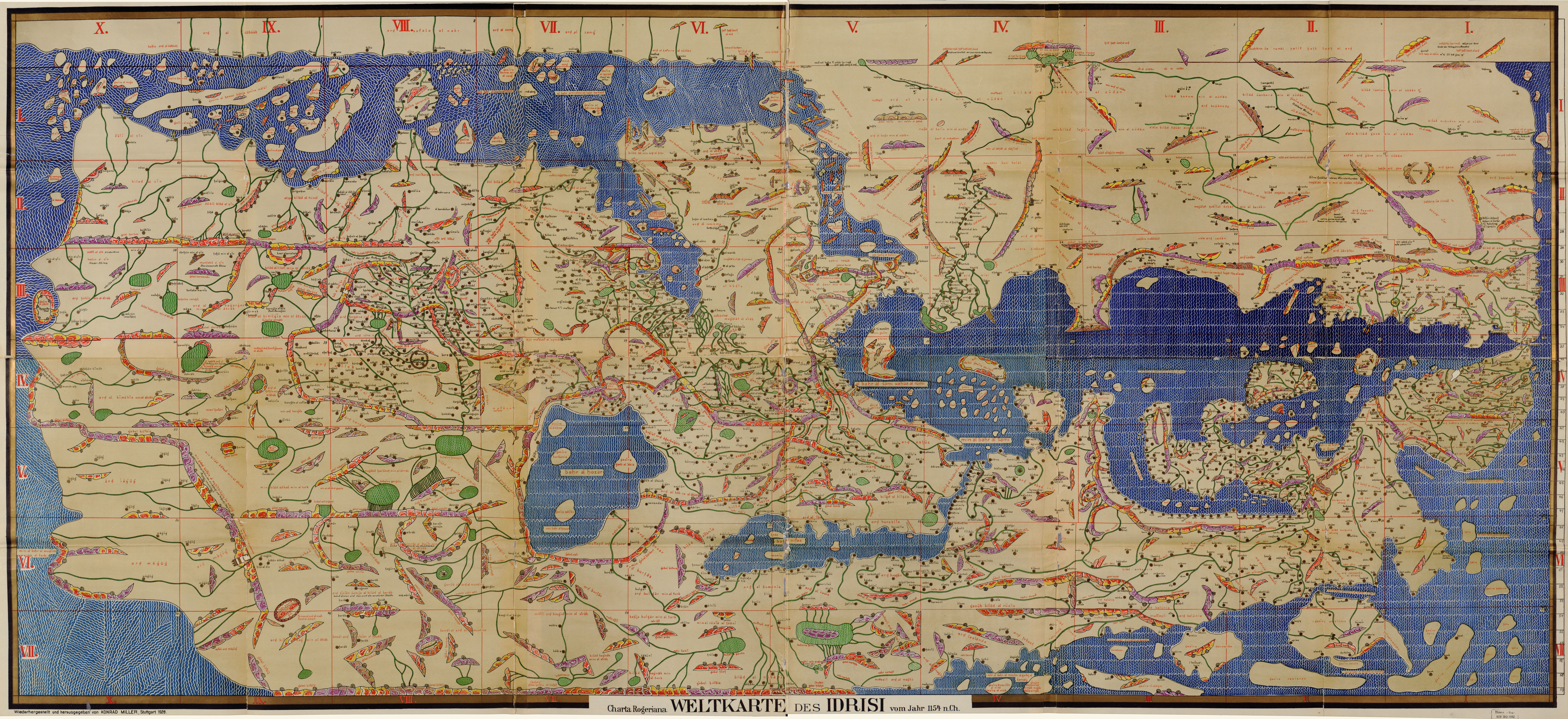
The Tabula Rogeriana, drawn by al-Idrisi for Roger II of Sicily in 1154, one of the most advanced medieval world maps. This modern consolidation, created from al-Idrisi's 70 double-page spreads, shows South at the top as was common in medieval Islamic cartography.

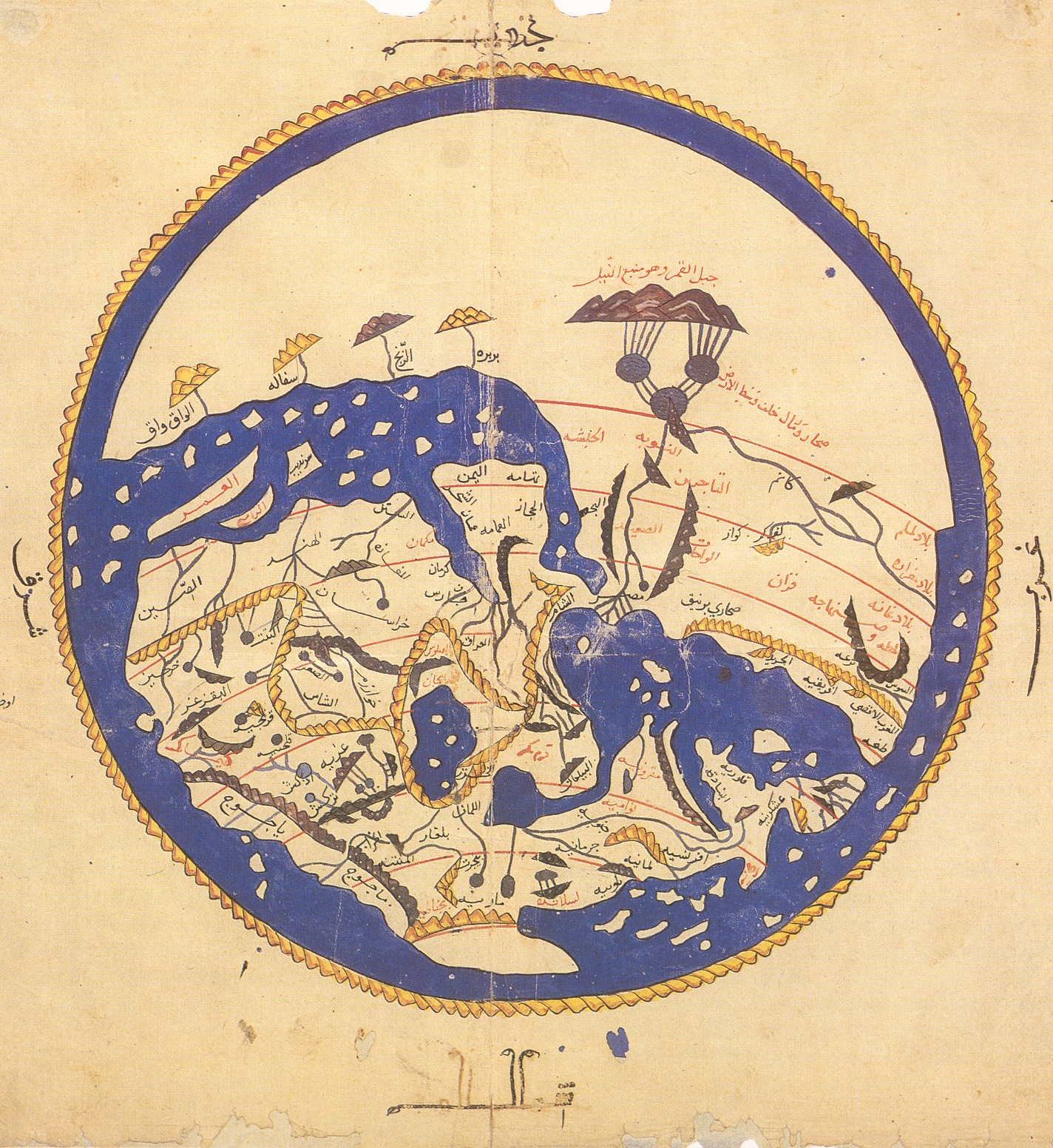
Al-Idrisi's world map from 'Alî ibn Hasan al-Hûfî al-Qâsimî's 1456 copy. According to the French National Library, "Ten copies of the Kitab Rujar or Tabula Rogeriana exist worldwide today. Of these ten, six contain at the start of the work a circular map of the world which is not mentioned in the text of al-Idris". The original text dates to 1154. South is at the top of the map.

Because of conflict and instability in Al-Andalus al-Idrisi joined contemporaries such as Abu al-Salt in Sicily, where the Normans had overthrown Arabs formerly loyal to the Fatimids.

Al-Idrisi incorporated the knowledge of Africa, the Indian Ocean and the Far East gathered by Islamic merchants and explorers and recorded on Islamic maps with the information brought by the Norman voyagers to create the most accurate map of the world in pre-modern times, which served as a concrete illustration of his Kitab nuzhat al-mushtaq, (Latin: Opus Geographicum), which may be translated A Diversion for the Man Longing to Travel to Far-Off Places.

The Tabula Rogeriana was drawn by al-Idrisi in 1154 for the Norman King Roger II of Sicily, after a stay of eighteen years at his court, where he worked on the commentaries and illustrations of the map. The map, with legends written in Arabic, while showing the Eurasian continent in its entirety, only shows the northern part of the African continent and lacks details of the Horn of Africa and Southeast Asia.

For Roger it was inscribed on a massive disc of solid silver, two metres in diameter.

On the geographical work of al-Idrisi, S.P. Scott wrote in 1904:

The compilation of al-Idrisi marks an era in the history of science. Not only is its historical information most interesting and valuable, but its descriptions of many parts of the earth are still authoritative. For three centuries geographers copied his maps without alteration. The relative position of the lakes which form the Nile, as delineated in his work, does not differ greatly from that established by Baker and Stanley more than seven hundred years afterwards, and their number is the same. The mechanical genius of the author was not inferior to his erudition. The celestial and terrestrial planisphere of silver which he constructed for his royal patron was nearly six feet in diameter, and weighed four hundred and fifty pounds; upon the one side the zodiac and the constellations, upon the other-divided for convenience into segments-the bodies of land and water, with the respective situations of the various countries, were engraved.

Al-Idrisi's work influenced a number of Islamic scholars including Ibn Sa'id al-Maghribi, Hafiz-i Abru, and Ibn Khaldun but his work was unknown in Western Europe and had little influence on the development of Renaissance cartography.

The oil colors he used in the creation of his maps, such as lapis lazuli blue for water, remain vivid to this day.

=== Description of islands in the North Sea ===
Al-Idrisi in his famous Tabula Rogeriana mentioned Irlandah-al-Kabirah (Great Ireland). According to him, "from the extremity of Iceland to that of Great Ireland," the sailing time was "one day." Although historians note that both al-Idrisi and the Norse tend to understate distances, the only location this reference is thought to have possibly pointed to, must likely have been in Greenland.

=== Description of Chinese trade ===
Al-Idrisi mentioned that Chinese junks carried leather, swords, iron and silk. He mentions the glassware of the city of Hangzhou and labels Quanzhou's silk as the best. In his records of Chinese trade, al-Idrisi also wrote about the Silla Dynasty (one of Korea's historical Dynasties, and a major trade partner to China at the time), and was one of the first Arabs to do so. Al-Idrisi's References to Silla led other Arab merchants to seek Silla and its trade, and contribute to many Arab's perception of Silla as the ideal East-Asian country.

== Nuzhat al-Mushtaq ==
As well as the maps, al-Idrisi produced a compendium of geographical information with the title Kitab nuzhat al-mushtaq fi'khtiraq al-'afaq. The title has been translated as The book of pleasant journeys into faraway lands or The pleasure of him who longs to cross the horizons. It has been preserved in nine manuscripts, seven of which contain maps.

The translated title of this work (in the "pleasure of him ..." form) attracted favourable comment from the team selecting lists of names for features expected to be discovered by the New Horizons probe reconnoitring the Pluto system. The Al-Idrisi Montes is a geographical feature in that system named after him.

In the introduction, al-Idrisi mentions two sources for geographical coordinates: Claudius Ptolemy and "an astronomer" that must be Ishaq ibn al-Hasan al-Zayyat; and states that he has cross-checked oral reports from different informers to see if geographical coordinates were consistent.

=== Publication and translation ===
An abridged version of the Arabic text was published in Rome in 1592 with title: De geographia universali or Kitāb Nuzhat al-mushtāq fī dhikr al-amṣār wa-al-aqṭār wa-al-buldān wa-al-juzur wa-al-madā' in wa-al-āfāq which in English would be Recreation of the desirer in the account of cities, regions, countries, islands, towns, and distant lands. This was one of the first Arabic books ever printed. The first translation from the original Arabic was into Latin. The Maronites Gabriel Sionita and Joannes Hesronita translated an abridged version of the text which was published in Paris in 1619 with the title of Geographia nubiensis. Not until the middle of the 19th century was a complete translation of the Arabic text published. This was a translation into French by Pierre Amédée Jaubert. More recently sections of the text have been translated for particular regions. Beginning in 1970 a critical edition of the complete Arabic text was published.

=== Andalusian-American contact ===
Al-Idrisi's geographical text, Nuzhat al-Mushtaq, is often cited by proponents of pre-Columbian Andalusian-Americas contact theories. In this text, al-Idrisi wrote the following on the Atlantic Ocean:

The Commander of the Muslims Ali ibn Yusuf ibn Tashfin sent his admiral Ahmad ibn Umar, better known under the name of Raqsh al-Auzz to attack a certain island in the Atlantic, but he died before doing that. [...] Beyond this ocean of fogs it is not known what exists there. Nobody has the sure knowledge of it, because it is very difficult to traverse it. Its atmosphere is foggy, its waves are very strong, its dangers are perilous, its beasts are terrible, and its winds are full of tempests. There are many islands, some of which are inhabited, others are submerged. No navigator traverses them but bypasses them remaining near their coast. [...] And it was from the town of Lisbon that the adventurers set out known under the name of Mughamarin [Adventurers], penetrated the ocean of fogs and wanted to know what it contained and where it ended. [...] After sailing for twelve more days they perceived an island that seemed to be inhabited, and there were cultivated fields. They sailed that way to see what it contained. But soon barques encircled them and made them prisoners, and transported them to a miserable hamlet situated on the coast. There they landed. The navigators saw there people with red skin; there was not much hair on their body, the hair of their head was straight, and they were of high stature. Their women were of an extraordinary beauty.

This translation by Professor Muhammad Hamidullah is however questionable, since it reports, after having reached an area of "sticky and stinking waters", the Mugharrarin (also translated as "the adventurers") moved back and first reached an uninhabited island where they found "a huge quantity of sheep the meat of which was bitter and uneatable" and, then, "continued southward" and reached the above reported island where they were soon surrounded by barques and brought to "a village whose inhabitants were often fair-haired with long and flaxen hair and the women of a rare beauty". Among the villagers, one spoke Arabic and asked them where they came from. Then the king of the village ordered them to bring them back to the continent where they were surprised to be welcomed by Berbers.

Apart from the marvellous and fanciful reports of this history, the most probable interpretation is that the Mugharrarin reached the Sargasso Sea, a part of the ocean covered by seaweed, which is very close to Bermuda yet one thousand miles away from the American mainland. Then while coming back, they may have landed either on the Azores, or on Madeira or even on the westernmost Canary Island, El Hierro (because of the sheep). Last, the story with the inhabited island might have occurred either on Tenerife or on Gran Canaria, where the Mugharrarin presumably met members of the Guanche tribe. This would explain why some of them could speak Arabic (some sporadic contacts had been maintained between the Canary Islands and Morocco) and why they were quickly deported to Morocco where they were welcomed by Berbers. Yet, the story reported by Idrisi is an indisputable account of a certain knowledge of the Atlantic Ocean by Andalusians and Moroccans.

Idrisi describes an island of cormorants with which has been tentatively identified as Corvo, Azores but on weak grounds.

== Medical dictionary ==
Among the lesser known works of al-Idrisi is a medical dictionary that he compiled in which he brings down a list of simple drugs and plants and their curative effects, used by physicians, apothecaries and merchants in his day. The list is unique, as it includes the names of drugs in as many as 12 languages (among which are Spanish, Berber, Latin, Greek and Sanskrit), including some sixty Hebrew terms transliterated into Arabic and which are thought to have been passed down to him by Andalusian Jewish informants. At the end of the section on medicinal herbs which are described under each letter of the alphabet, he gives an index of their entries. One of the books of herbal medicine frequently cited by al-Idrisi is Marwan ibn Ganah's Kitāb al-Talḫīṣ, who in turn had been influenced by the Andalusian physician Ibn Juljul.

== In popular culture ==
- Al-Idrisi was the main character in Tariq Ali's book entitled A Sultan in Palermo.
- Al-Idrisi is a major character in Karol Szymanowski's 1926 opera King Roger.
- Al-Idrisi is a supporting character in Zeyn Joukhadar's novel The Map of Salt and Stars
- In 2019, Factum Foundation created an interpretation of Al-Idrisi's world map, a silver disk 2m in diameter based on the maps contained in the Bodleian Library's copy of the Nuzhat al-Mushtaq.

== Gallery ==
Another version, huge resolution

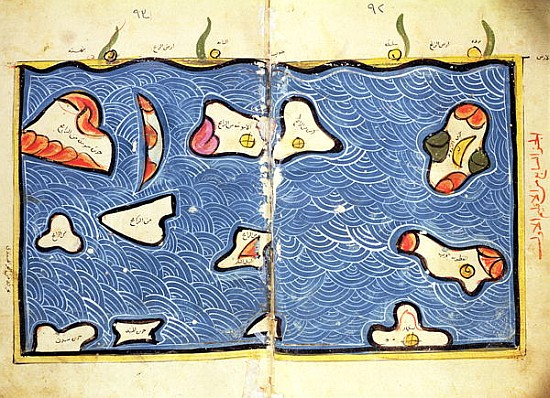
Al-Idrisi's map of the Indian Ocean.

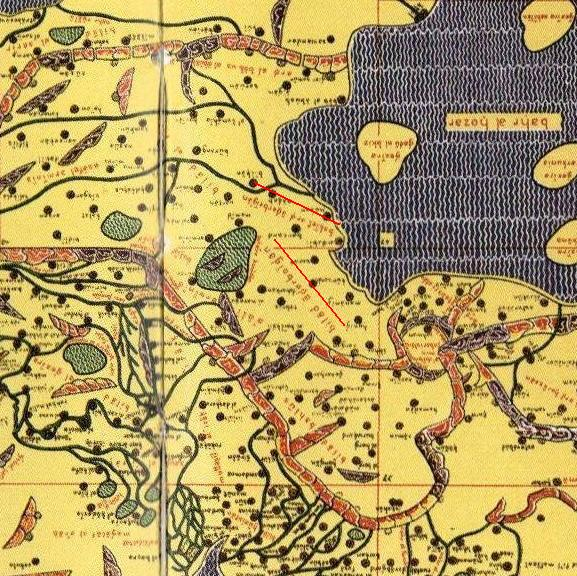
Al-Idrisi's map of North West Persia what is modern day Iranian Azerbaijan and the Caspian Sea.

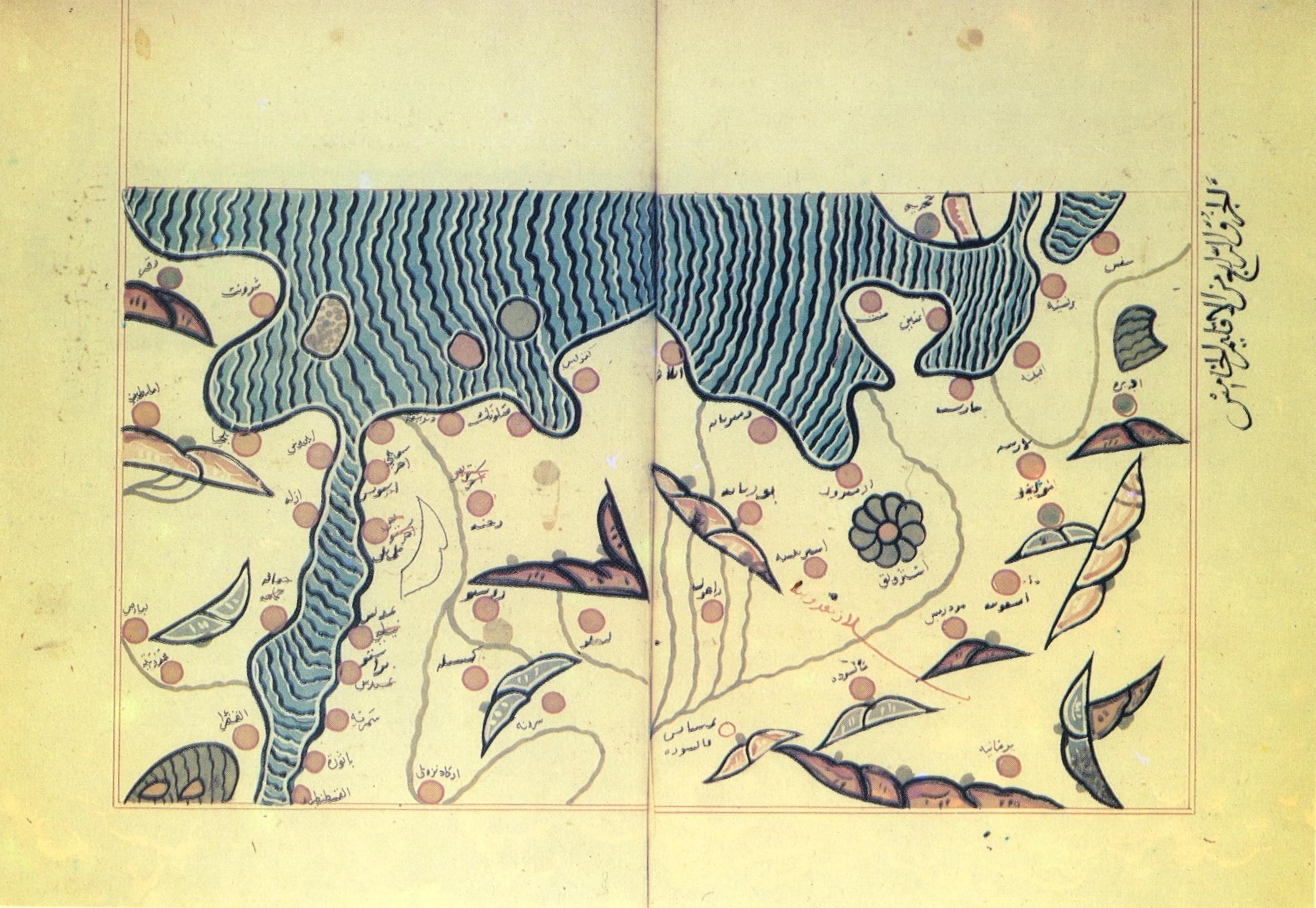
Al-Idrisi's map of the northern shoreline of Marmara Region.

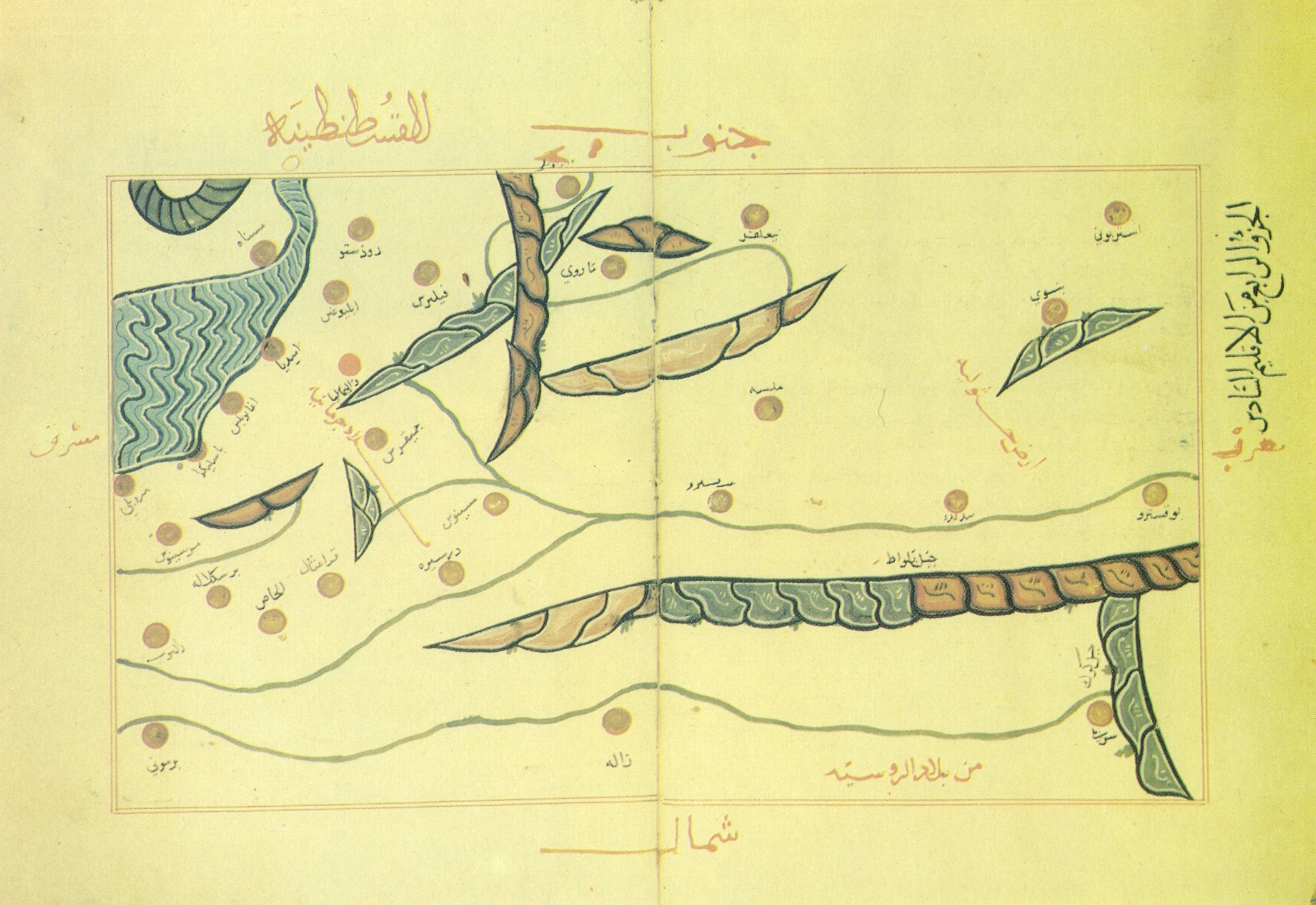
Al-Idrisi's map of the Balkans.

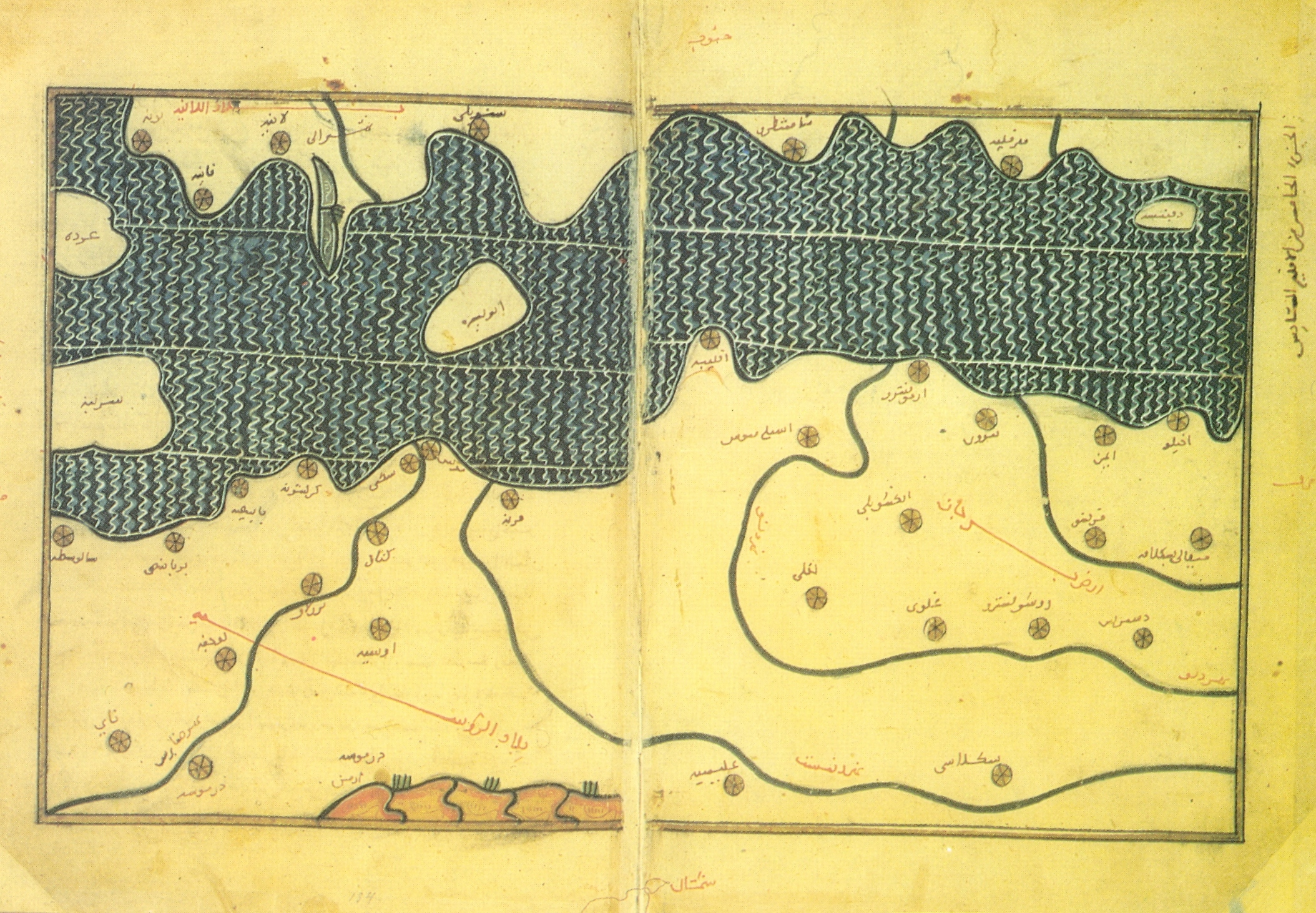
Al-Idrisi's map of the Balkans.

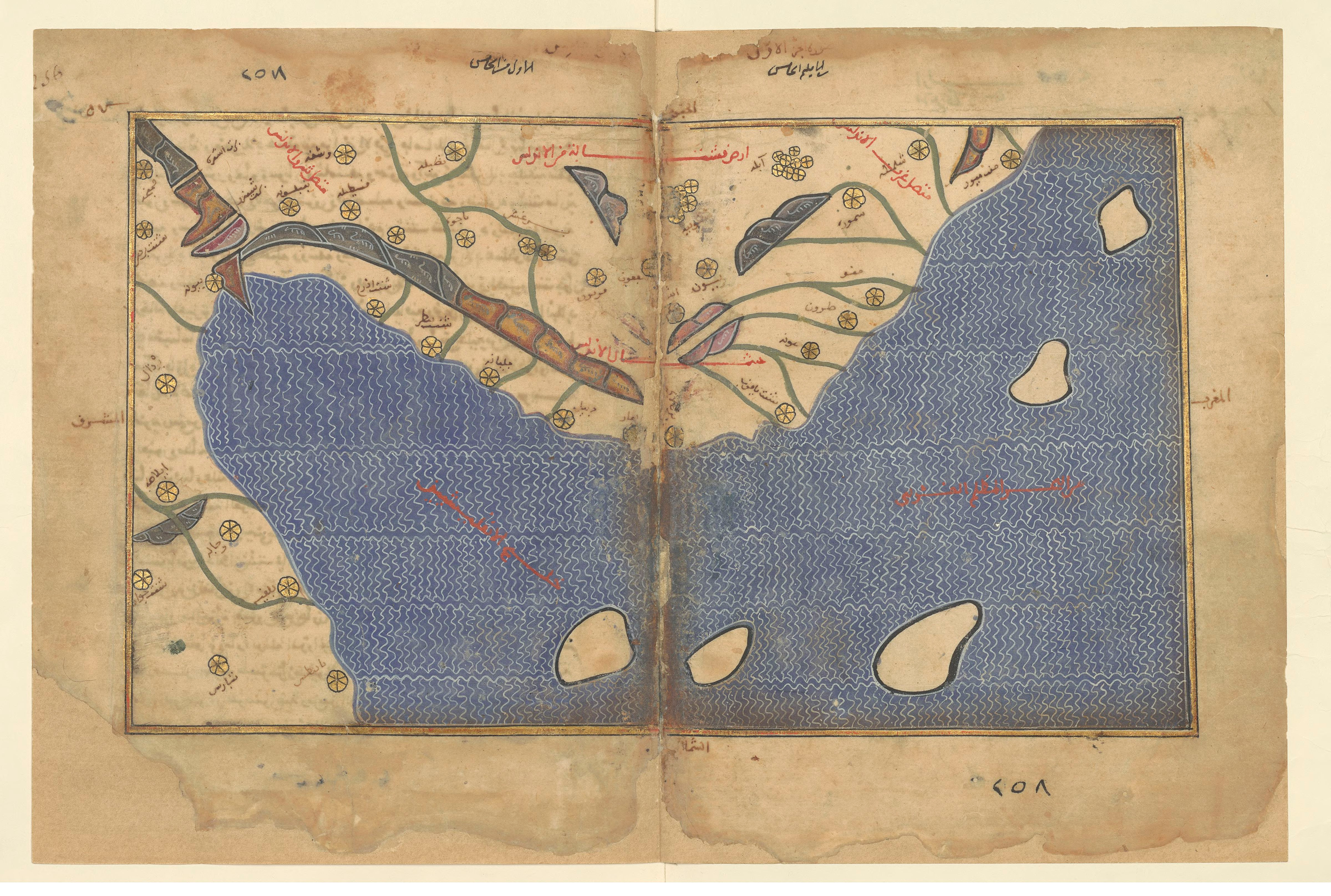
Al-Idrisi's map of the Iberian Peninsula.

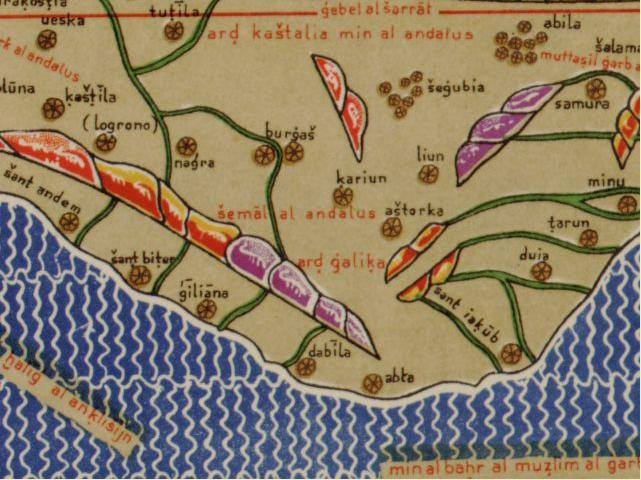
Al-Idrisi's map of the Iberian Peninsula.

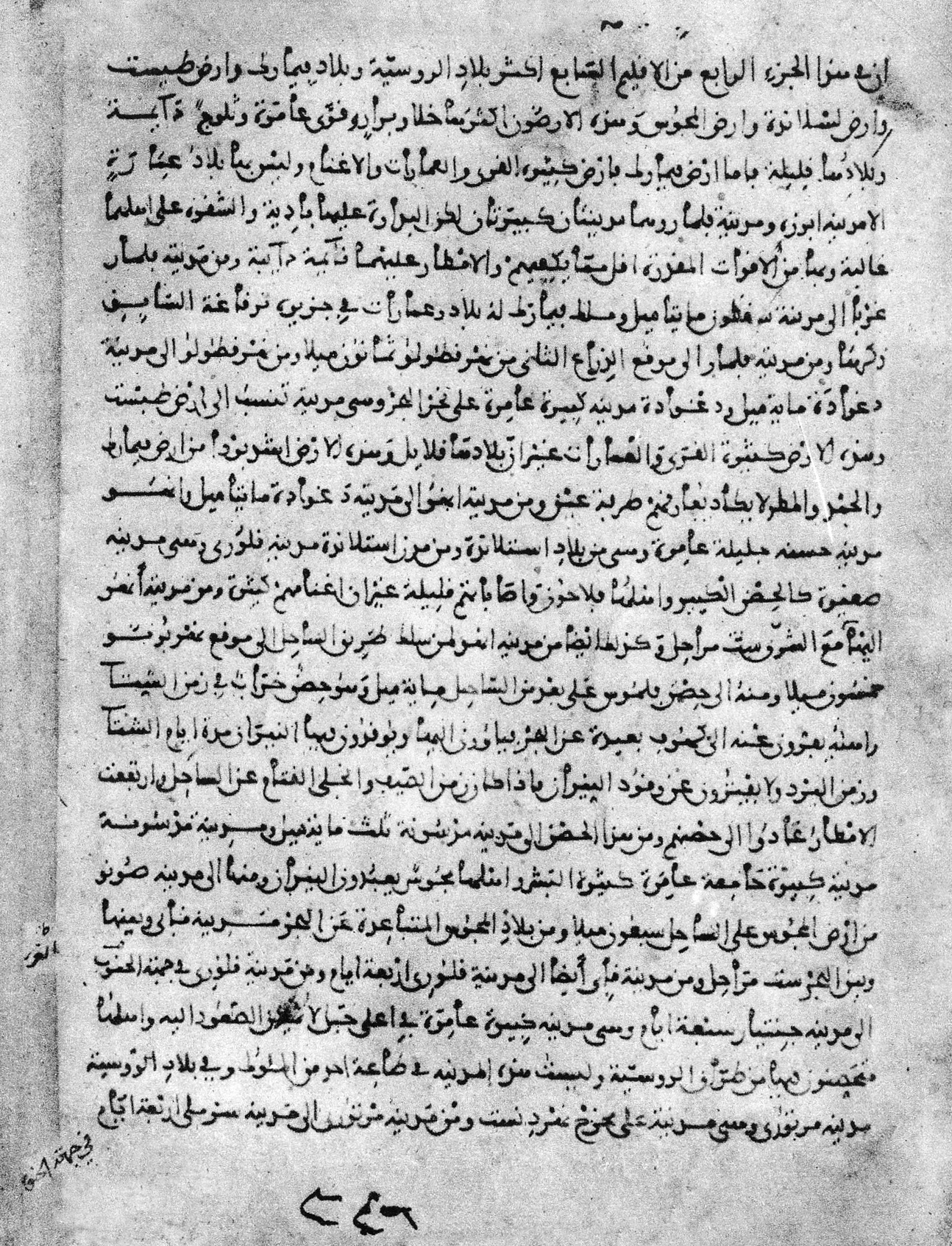
Al-Idrisi's description of Finland

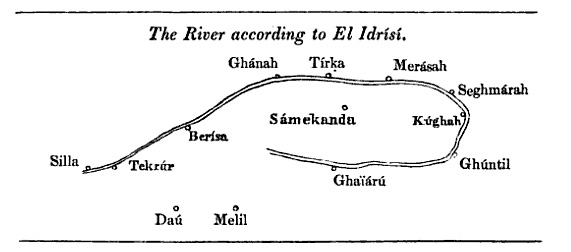
Map of the Senegal River according to al-Idrisi.

== See also ==
- Al-Bakri
- Ibn Jubayr
- Abu al-Salt
- History of cartography
- IDRISI software
- Islamic geography
- List of scientists

== Bibliography ==
- Ahmad, S. Maqbul, ed. (1960). India and the neighbouring territories in the "Kitab nuzhat al-mushtaq fi'khtiraq al-'afaq" of al-Sharif al-Idrisi. Translated by Ahmad. Leiden: Brill.
- Ahmad, S. Maqbul (1992). "Cartography of al-Sharīf al-Idrīsī" (PDF). In Harley, J.B.; Woodward, D. (eds.). The History of Cartography Vol. 2 Book 1: Cartography in the traditional Islamic and South Asian Societies. Chicago: University of Chicago Press. pp. 156–174. ISBN 978-0-226-31635-2.
- Al-Idrisi (1592). De Geographia Universali: Kitāb Nuzhat al-mushtāq fī dhikr al-amṣār wa-al-aqṭār wa-al-buldān wa-al-juzur wa-al-madā' in wa-al-āfāq. Rome: Medici.
- Al-Idrisi (1970–1984). Bombaci, A.; et al. (eds.). Opus geographicum: sive "Liber ad eorum delectationem qui terras peragrare studeant." (9 Fascicles) (in Arabic). Naples: Istituto Universitario Orientale. A critical edition of the Arabic text.
- Al-Idrîsî (1995), Kitâb al-Jâmi' li- sifât ashtât al-nabât wa-durûb anwâ' al-mufradât / Compendium of the Properties of Diverse Plants and Various Kinds of Simple Drugs, vols. I-III, Fuat Sezgin (ed). ISBN 3-8298-0287-0 (OCLC 1096433042)
- Amar, Z.; Serri, Yaron (2005). "Traces of Hebrew Language Traditions in al-Idrīsī's Medical Dictionary" שקיעים של מסורת לשון עברית במילון התרופות של אלאדריסי. Lĕšonénu: A Journal for the Study of the Hebrew Language and Cognate Subjects (in Hebrew). 67 (2). Academy of the Hebrew Language: 179–194. JSTOR 24331467.
- Bos, Gerrit [in German]; Käs, Fabian (2016). "Arabic Pharmacognostic Literature and Its Jewish Antecedents: Marwān ibn Ǧanāḥ (Rabbi Jonah), Kitāb al-Talḫīṣ". Aleph. 16 (1). Indiana University Press: 145–229. doi:10.2979/aleph.16.1.145. JSTOR 10.2979/aleph.16.1.145. S2CID 171046217.
- Ferrer-Gallardo, X. and Kramsch, O. T. (2016), Revisiting Al-Idrissi: The EU and the (Euro)Mediterranean Archipelago Frontier. Tijdschrift voor economische en sociale geografie, 107: 162–176. doi:10.1111/tesg.12177 http://onlinelibrary.wiley.com/doi/10.1111/tesg.12177/abstract
- Hamarneh, Sami Khalaf (1973). Origins of Pharmacy and Therapy in the Near East. Tokyo: The Naito Foundation. OCLC 1104696.
- Jaubert, P. Amédée (1836–1840). Géographie d'Édrisi traduite de l'arabe en français d'après deux manuscrits de la Bibliothèque du roi et accompagnée de notes (2 Vols). Paris: L'imprimerie Royale. Volume 1: Gallica / Internet Archive; Volume 2: Gallica / Internet Archive. Complete translation of Nuzhat al-mushtāq fī ikhtirāq al-āfāq into French.
- Levtzion, Nehemia; Hopkins, John F.P., eds. (2000). Corpus of Early Arabic Sources for West Africa. New York, NY: Marcus Weiner Press. pp. 104–131. ISBN 978-1-55876-241-1. First published in 1981. Section on the Maghrib and Sudan from Nuzhat al-mushtaq fi ikhtiraq al-afaq.
- Sionita, Gabriel; Hesronita, Joannes (1619). Geographia nubiensis: id est accuratissima totius orbis in septem climata divisi descriptio, continens praesertim exactam vniuersae Asiae, & Africae, rerumq[ue] in ijs hactenus incognitarum explicationem. Paris: Hieronymi Blageart.
- El Daly, Okasha (2016). Egyptology: The Missing Millennium Ancient Egypt in Medieval Arabic Writings. Taylor & Francis.177
