= Matthew H. Edney =

Matthew H. Edney is a British geographer who is both the Osher Professor in the History of Cartography, at the University of Southern Maine; and the Project Director of the History of Cartography Project at the University of Wisconsin-Madison. Edney maintains a blog, Mapping as Process, where he discusses the study of mapping processes: production, circulation, and consumption.

== Early life and education ==
Matthew H. Edney was born in 1962 in London SW19. He completed the B.Sc. (hons.) in Geography at University College London (1983) and then the M.S. in Cartography (1985) and Ph.D. in Geography (1990) at the University of Wisconsin–Madison.

== Career ==
After teaching at SUNY–Binghamton (a.k.a. Binghamton University) in 1990–95, Edney moved to the University of Southern Maine as faculty scholar in the Osher Map Library and Smith Center for Cartographic Education. In 2007 he also became Osher Professor in the History of Cartography.

Already working with Mary Pedley as editors of Cartography in the European Enlightenment, volume 4 of The History of Cartography, Edney took over in 2005 as director of the History of Cartography Project, at the University of Wisconsin–Madison, after the death of his graduate advisor, David Woodward. In this capacity, Edney implemented Woodward's strategy of pursuing the last three volumes of the series concurrently and as interpretive encyclopedias. He persuaded the University of Chicago Press to publish the three volumes (4, 5, and 6) in full color and to place the published volumes online for free public access.

Edney's research interests have addressed a variety of topics and concerns. His dissertation was published as Mapping an Empire: The Geographical Construction of British India, 1765–1843 (Chicago, 1997). Since moving to Maine, Edney has particularly studied the mapping of colonial New England and North America, including essays on William Hubbard's map of New England (1677), the first map printed in British America, John Smith's map of New England (1616|7), and John Mitchell's 1755 map of North America that is often called "the most important map in American history." He has an abiding interest in developing conceptual frameworks for mapping and map history, which has matured into a large project; the first part appeared in 2019 as Cartography: The Ideal and Its History.

== Selected publications ==
=== Peer-reviewed books and monographs ===
- Edney, M. H. Cartography: The Ideal and Its History. Chicago: University of Chicago Press, 2019.
- Edney, M. H. Mapping an Empire: The Geographical Construction of British India, 1765–1843. Chicago: University of Chicago Press, 1997.
- Edney, M. H. The Origins and Development of J. B. Harley’s Cartographic Theories. Cartographica Monograph 54. Cartographica 40, nos. 1–2. Toronto: University of Toronto Press, 2005.
- Edney, M. & Pedley, M.S. (eds.) The History of Cartography, Volume 4. Chicago: University of Chicago Press, 2019.

=== Peer-reviewed essays ===
- Edney, M. H. Map History: Discourse and Process. In The Routledge Handbook of Mapping and Cartography, edited by Alexander J. Kent and Peter Vujakovic, 68–79. London: Routledge, 2017.
