= Myron Weiner =

Social science scholar

- Born: 11 March 1931; New York City
- Died: 3 June 1999 (aged 68); Moretown, Vermont
- Education: Princeton University
- Scientific career
- Fields: Political science
- Workplaces: Massachusetts Institute of Technology

Myron Weiner (11 March 1931 – 3 June 1999) was an American political scientist and renowned scholar of India, South Asia, internal and international migration, ethnic conflict, child labor, democratization, political demography, and the politics and policies of developing countries.

== Education and career ==
Weiner was born in New York City in 1931. He received a BSS degree from the City College of New York in 1951 and MA and PhD degrees from Princeton University in 1953 and 1955. He taught at Princeton and the University of Chicago before coming to MIT as an associate professor in 1961, where he worked for 38 years before retiring in April 1999. He was promoted to the rank of full professor in 1965 and served as head of the Department of Political Science From 1974-77. He was named the Ford International Professor of Political Science at MIT in 1977. He was also director of MIT's Center for International Studies from 1987–92, and acting director in 1995-96.

"Myron Weiner was a brilliant scholar, and an inspiring teacher and colleague, who had a large impact on the world, in particular on the lives of children," said Professor Joshua Cohen, then-head of the MIT Department of Political Science.

Professor Weiner served as a consultant to the World Bank, the Agency for International Development, the US State Department, and the U.S. National Security Council. He was elected to the American Philosophical Society, and was a member of the American Academy of Arts and Sciences, Council on Foreign Relations, and a past president of the New England Association of Asian Studies. He held visiting appointments at Oxford University's Balliol College, Harvard University, Delhi University, Hebrew University and the University of Paris. Dr. Weiner was chair of the External Research and Advisory Committee of the United Nations High Commissioner for Refugees from 1996 until his death.

== Research and publications ==
He was the author or editor of 32 scholarly books and numerous peer-reviewed articles. His most recent research involved three projects: child labor and education policy in India and other developing countries; comparing immigration, refugees and citizenship policies in Japan, Germany, South Africa and the USA; and analyzing the causes and effects of migration and refugee flows.

Dr. Weiner's 1991 book The Child and the State in India: Child Labor and Education Policy in Comparative Perspective (Princeton University Press, 4th ed., ISBN 978-0-691-07868-7) had a major impact in Indian debates on how to end child labor, and was perhaps his magnum opus. "It was his crowning achievement. It made all of us think about the question of illiteracy," according to Jagdish Bhagwati, a Columbia University economist and colleague since the mid-1950s. Dr. Bhagwati said the book prompted economists to recommend more investments in education for the poor, and policies to help poor people recognize education as a valuable investment.

Prior to his book, the prevailing view of many was that countries like India were too poor to do much about child labor or access to education by the poor, because parents needed working-children to support the family and only when incomes rose would this change. Using impassive data and scholarly language, Weiner's work reversed the causal direction, showing that historically (e.g. in Scotland) and cross-nationally (e.g. in even-poorer Africa and China), the reforms which expanded education preceded higher incomes. The 1991 book showed how India had fared worse on illiteracy and education than China. Joshua Cohen said the book had a profound impact in India: "Here was a work, written by a friend of India, which presented irrefutable facts. It presented comparative statistics, and while it raised moral issues, it was not written as a moral diatribe."

His contrarian views sometimes caused controversy, e.g., showing that democratization can exacerbate ethnic conflict, or the perverse effects of well-intentioned affirmative-action or child labor policies. With Samuel P. Huntington and Lucian Pye, he was a co-founder and co-director for many years of the Harvard-MIT Joint Seminar on Political Development (JOSPOD) research project. Critics associated him, fairly or not, with the Modernization school of thought, and with certain US policies during the Vietnam War.

His most recent books were The Global Migration Crisis: Challenge to States and to Human Rights (HarperCollins, 1995 ISBN 978-0-06-500232-4); Threatened Peoples, Threatened Borders: World Migration and US Policy (co-editor, W. Norton, 1995); The New Geopolitics of Central Asia and its Borderlands (co-editor, Indiana University Press, 1994); The State and Social Transformation in Afghanistan, Iran and Pakistan (co-editor, Syracuse University Press, 1994); and International Migration and Security (editor, Westview Press, 1993).

Other books include Sons of the Soil: Migration and Ethnic Conflict in India (Princeton Univ Pr 1978 ISBN 978-0-691-09379-6; reprinted 1988 by Oxford University Press ISBN 978-0-19-562242-3).

Among his many former students are Baldev Raj Nayar, Ashutosh Varshney, and Steven Wilkinson.

== Personal life ==
Weiner died of brain cancer on June 3, 1999, at his home in Moretown, Vermont, at age 68. He was married to Sheila Leiman Weiner. They had two children, Saul Weiner of Chicago and a daughter, Beth Weiner Datskovsky, of Bala Cynwyd, Pennsylvania.

== Bibliography ==
- "Myron Weiner, 68, Expert on Child Labor in Developing Lands," by Michael T. Kaufman, New York Times, June 9, 1999.
- "Professor of Political Science Myron Weiner is dead at age 68," MIT Tech Talk, 9 June 1999.
- Mandarins of the Future: Modernization Theory in Cold War America, by Nils Gilman (Johns Hopkins University Press, 2003).
- "CIS Turns 60: An Interview with Three Directors," Précis Spring 2011, MIT Center for International Studies.
- India and the politics of developing countries: essays in memory of Myron Weiner, by Myron Weiner and Ashutosh Varshney (Sage Publications, 2004 ISBN 978-0-7619-3287-1).
