= A Historical Atlas of South Asia =

- Author: Joseph E. Schwartzberg
- Language: English
- Genre: Historical atlas
- Publisher: University of Chicago Press
- Publication date: 1978 (Revised edition: Oxford University Press, 1992)
- Publication place: United States
- Media type: Paperback
- ISBN: 0-19-506869-6

A Historical Atlas of South Asia is a historical chronology of the region of South Asia from prehistoric times through the present. It was edited and largely authored by Joseph E. Schwartzberg, professor emeritus of South Asian Studies at the University of Minnesota. It is highly regarded by scholars of South Asian history for its vast amount of detail and coverage of the region's lengthy and complex history. The atlas is divided into two main sections: maps and photographs, and prose which corresponds to and explains the maps.

The initial assembly of the Atlas began in 1964 with many authors, historians, cartographers and researchers contributing over a fourteen-year period. Although many consider the atlas to be the ultimate resource for students and scholars alike, the authors stress that "it is intended to supplement existing histories of South Asia...not to be used in place of them."

The atlas was first published in 1978 by the University of Chicago Press. About 3,300 total copies were produced and all of them sold, which caused the atlas to become out of print. In 1992, Schwartzberg and a new team of historians released a slightly updated second edition titled Second Impression, with Additional Material and published by Oxford University Press. This edition is now also out of print.

In 1980 the American Historical Association bestowed the Watumull Prize on the Atlas.
