= Dorothy Stein =

American psychologist and computer scientist (1931–2019)

- Born: Dorothy Josephine del Bourgo; March 31, 1931; Newark, New Jersey, U.S.
- Died: March 16, 2019 (aged 87); London, England
- Other name: Dorothy Josephine del Bourgo Kellogg Stein
- Education: Cornell University
- Known for: Research on Ada Lovelace, Early computer programming
- Notable work: Ada, A Life and a Legacy
- Spouse(s): Paul Kellogg (m. 1951; div. 1964), Burton Stein (m. 1966)
- Children: 2
- Scientific career
- Fields: Computer Science, Psychology

Dorothy Josephine del Bourgo Kellogg Stein (March 31, 1931 – March 16, 2019) was an American early computer programmer, psychologist, author and social activist. Her activities landed her on the cusp of or ahead of her time. She is best known for researching and writing the book Ada: A Life and Legacy, which argued that Ada Lovelace was not the first computer programmer and did not have the mathematical ability to assist Charles Babbage as much as was believed.

== Early life ==
She was born Dorothy Josephine del Bourgo in Newark, New Jersey. She was the first of two daughters of Jacob Del Bourgo, a civil engineer, and Charlotte Del Bourgo (née Styler). Jacob was a Sephardic Jew born to a family of pearl traders, and Charlotte was of Ashkenazi descent, fleeing Eastern Europe as a youth. The two sisters were raised as culturally Jewish but not particularly devout, and Dorothy had fond memories of bacon as a special treat during the Great Depression.

Jacob Del Bourgo was unable to find work in the United States for some time, and so moved the family to Venezuela. In the aftermath of World War II, engineers became more in demand and employment discrimination against Jews declined, allowing the family to settle in New York. Stein graduated high school early and attended Cornell University, earning her degree in Physics in 1951. Work on her second degree, involving experiments with a cloud chamber, was interrupted by meeting and eventually marrying Paul Kellogg, then completing his PhD in physics at Cornell.

After a year in Copenhagen at the high energy physics institute led by Niels Bohr, the couple returned to America, where in 1955 Stein worked on one of the first computers, calculating missile trajectories, while her husband worked in nuclear physics and the new field of solar plasma. In 1956, they moved to Minnesota, where Paul became a professor in the physics department of the University of Minnesota. There Dorothy gave birth to their two sons, Kenneth in 1956 and David in 1959.

Dorothy and Paul divorced in 1964, and two years later Dorothy married Burton Stein, a professor of Indian history. In 1968 Dorothy finished a PhD in child psychology that established, using dichotic listening techniques, that syllables are not phonemes, but are psychologically real (the precise implications of this remain indistinct).

== Career ==
The Steins moved to Hawaii, where Burt became a Professor at the University of Hawaii. During the rise of the feminist movement, Stein helped to establish a Women’s studies department there with Joan Abramson and Doris Ladd. When Burt retired from teaching in 1980, they moved to London, where Burt wrote histories of India.

Stein became interested in the life of Ada, Countess of Lovelace, the only legitimate child of Lord Byron, who at the time was believed to have written the very first computer programs (the US Defense Department, which Stein used to work for, had just named the ADA programming language after her). Through assiduous work at the Bodleian Library and elsewhere, Stein began to realize that Ada was a more Byronic heroine; she gambled, took drugs, probably had extra-marital liaisons, and certainly had only a feeble grasp of the mathematics behind the computer. In a set of papers and her book Ada, A life and a Legacy, which is still highly controversial, Stein speculated that much of her computer work was really ghost-written by Charles Babbage.

Burton Stein died in 1996, but by that time, Stein had become fond of London, and continued to live in their flat. Concerned about population growth, she wrote another book, People Who Count, which argued that women would choose to have fewer children if they were given the freedom to use family planning. In later years she devoted herself to gardening, bookbinding, making clothes, and working for Oxfam.

Dr. Stein began to suffer memory loss, and eventually moved into Nightingale’s in Clapham. Her decline became rapid in early 2019 and she died on March 16.

== Works ==
- 1985: Ada, A life and a legacy. History of Computing. MIT Press. 15 October 1985. ISBN 9780262192422.
- 1995: People Who Count. Earthscan Publications Ltd. 1995. ISBN 9781853832338.
