= Joseph E. Schwartzberg =

American writer, peace activist, and professor

Joseph E. Schwartzberg (February 5, 1928 – September 19, 2018) was an American writer, peace activist, and a world federalist, who was a tenured professor at the University of Minnesota. Author of numerous books, he was the editor and principal author of the Historical Atlas of South Asia, which in 1980 won the Watumull Prize of the American Historical Association. In 1984 the American Association of Geographers honored him with their annual award. His several substantial chapters in Book One of Volume Two of The History of Cartography were instrumental in that work receiving the R. R. Hawkins Award for Best Scholarly Book for 1992 from the Association of American Publishers. He served on the board of directors of the World Federalist Association, has chaired its Policy and Issues Commission, and is President of the Minnesota chapter of Citizens for Global Solutions.

== Biography ==
=== Early life ===
Born in Brooklyn, New York on February 5, 1928, Schwartzberg was the second of four children of Philip and Frances Schwartzberg. He, his older brother and two younger sisters were born within a span of less than six years. All six members of the family participated in the operation of their small clothing store. They lived in two rooms behind the store during the bad years of the depression and in an apartment immediately above it when times were good. Schwartzberg graduated from Erasmus Hall High School in 1945 and in 1949 from Brooklyn College (cum laude), where he majored in geology. For parts of three summers during his high school years he worked on farms to aid the war effort; but, as the war drew to a close in the summer of 1945, he hitchhiked to and through Mexico, as far as the Pacific coast town of Acapulco. In college he joined and ultimately became president of a then rare inter-racial service fraternity.

Shortly after earning his B.A, Schwartzberg took a position as a geographer with the Map Intelligence Branch of the U.S. Army Map Service in a suburb of Washington, D.C. and simultaneously worked for his M.A. at the University of Maryland. His master's thesis, Old Order Amish and Stauffer Mennonite Communities in Southern Maryland, was based on field research among the communities named. This work instilled in him a love of fieldwork and an abiding interest in "plain people" and, more generally, in communities with life styles deviating from established norms. Around the same time, through Washington's First Unitarian Church, he became familiar with the then burgeoning World Federalist movement. He has maintained his allegiance to the "one world" ideal ever since.

Following the outbreak of war in Korea, Schwartzberg was drafted into the U.S. Army. Although he anticipated that he would be sent to Korea immediately on conclusion of his infantry basic training, he was assigned instead to a topographic engineering battalion headquartered in the Presidio of San Francisco. After nine months in that unit he accepted a commission as a 2nd lieutenant and was transferred to Fort Belvoir, Virginia, where he trained for work in a newly created terrain intelligence unit that was dispatched to Heidelberg, Germany in December 1952. His duties entailed extensive travel in Germany and many opportunities to improve his language skills.

Conclusion of the Korean War led to a major reduction of the pool of junior army officers, enabling Schwartzberg, by then a 1st lieutenant, to accept an early overseas discharge. Thus began a period of nearly three additional years of foreign travel and residence. This period included four months in Seville, Spain (then still under the rule of Franco) in early 1953; eight months in Paris in 1953–54, studying French language and civilization at the Sorbonne (courtesy of the G.I. Bill of Rights); travels in many other parts of Europe; a month in Israel; brief sojourns in many Islamic nations in North Africa and the Middle East; a half-year touring India and other countries of South Asia (marked by visits at a number of Gandhian ashrams and government-managed community development projects; and by the start of a decades-long friendship with an itinerant holy man [sadhu]); several months in Southeast Asia; and a month in Japan.

During his stay in Paris, Schwartzberg drew up a rough draft of a World Constitution, many of whose ideas were incorporated in articles and books published decades later. His federalist thinking was reinforced by his experience in India, the world's most populous federal polity. Considering that, despite its many serious problems, meager resources and incredibly diverse population, India was able to maintain a viable democracy convinced him that a federalized world, with vastly greater resources, could do so as well.

In September 1956 Schwartzberg embarked on study for a doctoral degree at the University of Wisconsin. He had by then decided to specialize in either South or Southeast Asia, and chose as his advisor the renowned geographer, Richard Hartshorne, notwithstanding the fact that Hartshorne had no Asian experience. That somehow did not matter. In 1958 Schwartzberg was awarded the first of two year-long fellowships from the Social Science Research Council, the first for field work in India, the second for support while writing his dissertation His field work entailed thousands of miles of travel by bicycle (accompanied by Indian interpreters) to 200 villages throughout India. His dissertation, Occupational Structure and Level of Economic Development in India: A Regional Analysis, completed in 1960, was later published as monograph no. 4 of the 1961 Census of India.

=== Professional life ===
In 1960, Schwartzberg accepted a dual appointment at the University of Pennsylvania, joining the Wharton School's Department of Geography and Industry and the Department of South Asia Regional Studies, the first such regionally specialized program in the United States. His contacts in the latter department greatly expanded his multi-disciplinary understanding, not only of South Asia, but also of regional studies in general. Several relevant papers on regionalism ensued, as did two seminal papers on the geography of the Indian caste system.

In 1962 Schwartzberg was appointed to train, at the University of Pennsylvania, the first group of Peace Corps volunteers to be sent to Ceylon (now Sri Lanka). He accompanied that group to Ceylon for a final month of training, following which he spent almost a year in India as a Fellow of the American Institute of Indian Studies. For most of this period he expanded his research of the year 1958–59. He also worked, pro bono, for the Indian Census, drawing up detailed templates for the series of national and state atlases that thereafter formed components of the nation's decennial censuses.

During this year he met Monique Ribaux, a Swiss medical lab technician working for the malaria eradication program of the World Health Organization. They were married in Geneva in December 1963, subsequently had two sons, Philip (b. 1964) and Paul (b. 1966). They were divorced in 1998.

In the spring of 1964, Schwartzberg learned of a proposal to create a Historical Atlas of South Asia at the University of Minnesota, following the bequest to that institution of the magnificent Ames Library of South Asia. Excited by that challenging initiative, he wrote a lengthy memorandum to its two principal faculty supporters specifying what he thought such an atlas should contain. This resulted in an invitation for him to come to Minnesota to join the Geography Department and edit the work. He accepted the offer, effective that December.

The atlas project took much longer than anticipated, entailing numerous research grants, and requiring roughly 85 person-years of work from a multi-disciplinary team of specialists. First published by the University of Chicago Press in 1978, the work was reissued in an updated edition by the Oxford University Press in 1992, and in a digitized edition by the University of Chicago in 2006. It won the Watumull Prize of the American Historical Association, as the best work on Indian history of the 1978-79 biennium and an outstanding achievement award from the Association of American Geographers. In 1981 David Watumull observed:

“Over the years, since 1946 when this Prize was instituted, I can … say, without a doubt, that this is the finest and most worthwhile book to be selected.”

What makes the work unique is its presentation, not only of the findings of modern historians of South Asia, but also its recreations of the ways in which aspects of that region were made known by numerous actors – both South Asian and outsiders –over more than three millennia.

Publication of the atlas led to Schwartzberg's role in what was to become an even larger (and still on-going) project, the preparation of a multi-volume History of Cartography, prepared by the History of Cartography Project at the University of Wisconsin in Madison. Apart from offering advice in planning the work, he was asked to write an article on the traditional cartographies of South Asia, a subject on which there was then virtually no extant literature. However, years of research in South Asia and neighboring regions – in libraries, museums and private art collections, as well as in the field – uncovered a vastly larger corpus of cartographic and cosmographic artifacts than one might have anticipated. Schwartzberg was to become the principal author and an associate editor of two volumes of the history: the award-winning Cartography in the Traditional Islamic and South Asian Societies, and Cartography in the Traditional East and Southeast Asian Societies (Chicago: University of Chicago Press, 1992 and 1994 respectively). Both volumes are available for free access at History of Cartography Online.

Schwartzberg's additional writing in his years at Minnesota (1964-2000) took numerous forms: scores of book reviews, essays in political geography, editorials on contemporary issues and events, numerous articles on the Kashmir dispute, work on folk regions in South Asia, a short monograph relating to the history of exploration, various spin-offs from his work on the history of cartography, and major contributions to several encyclopedias, including the lengthy article on the “Physical and Human Geography [of India]” for the 15th edition of the Encyclopaedia Britannica on whose advisory board he subsequently served.

Schwartzberg's writings on Kashmir were focused on promoting a peaceful resolution of the multi-partite disputes over that region. They were based largely on his visits – in 1993, 1994 and 1997 – to all parts of that contested, ethnically diverse state. He conducted interviews, on both sides of the Indo-Pakistani line of control, with a wide range of political actors (UN personnel, civil administrators, military officers, party leaders, dissidents [some in hiding], businessmen, journalists, victims of violence, and others). While his tours in 1993 and 1994 were largely self-financed, that of 1997 was as part of a fact-finding team sponsored by and drawn from the Kashmir Study Group (KSG), a think tank made up mainly of scholars and retired diplomats, established in 1996 by Farooq Kathwari, a wealthy Kashmir-American businessman. Though the published findings and recommendations of the KSG (to which Schwartzberg was a principal contributor), were widely discussed in diplomatic circles in South Asia, North America and Europe, hawkish nationalistic spoilers ultimately prevented their adoption. The KSG still exists, but is less active than in its early years.

Along with writing, Schwartzberg taught thousands of students in a variety of courses and seminars. His most popular courses were introductory human geography (a sweeping overview of how the world is constituted) and political geography (wherein one is challenged – as in the real world – by the necessity of striking a credible balance between idealism and realpolitik). More specialized were his offerings on South and Southeast Asia and on historical cartography. Of particular relevance for his on-going work were his seminars on “The Geography of Federalism,” “The Law of the Sea” and “A Charter for the New Millennium.” In 1979–80, he held a visiting Fulbright professorship at the Center for the Study of Regional Development at Jawaharlal Nehru University in New Delhi, during which he offered a course in population geography and a seminar on field methods.

Attendance at conferences has provided Schwartzberg with abundant opportunities for travel, either en route to or returning from the conference venue. His participation at the 1992 Rio Summit Conference on the Environment and Development, for example, was followed by extensive travel in South America; and his atlas presentation at the Canberra meeting of the International Congress of Orientalists in 1971 was combined with visits to a number of Pacific Island nations. In all, Schwartzberg has traveled to approximately a hundred countries.

Intermittently, Schwartzberg served as a consultant to numerous governmental and scholarly agencies in India, the United States and Canada and as a member of selection committees for various academic awards. His previously noted work for the Indian Census was instrumental in his consulting with the Mandal Commission tasked with devising a quota system for allocating jobs and educational seats for members of so-called “other backward castes.” For three years (1985–88) Schwartzberg was the elected Secretary of the US National Commission of the International Geographic Union.

In recognition of his scholarly achievements the Department of Geography nominated Schwartzberg in 1995 and in 1996 for a highly competitive Regents Professorship, the highest academic honor that the University of Minnesota can bestow. However, neither nomination resulted in success.

Apart from scholarship, Schwartzberg was also heavily engaged in service activities on and off campus. On campus, he served as Chair of the Department of South Asian and Middle Eastern Studies, as an elected representative in the University Senate and in the Assembly of the College of Liberal Arts, and as a member of innumerable committees. For three years (1984–87) he directed the Minnesota Studies in International Development program, providing unpaid student internships in a number of countries of the global South. He established several programs in India and headed a delegation to Colombia, which led to a program with that nation's Fundación Social a business conglomerate guided by the Jesuit teachings of “liberation theology”. For several years following the Colombia visit, Schwartzberg was among a group of activists that tried (unsuccessfully) to establish an inner-city cooperative bank based on the Fundación model. In 2009 the university bestowed on him its annual “Award for Global Engagement “and the title “Distinguished International Emeritus Professor.”

In the public arena, Schwartzberg was also quite active. He served in various capacities in the Minnesota Chapter of the World Federalist Association (later Citizens for Global Solutions), including 14 years as its president. He was also active in several roles in the governance of WFA/CGS at the national level. He chaired WFA's Policy and Recommendations Committee for several years prior to the establishment of CGS in 2004 and for the following decade was especially active in the World Federalist Institute, a CGS-affiliated think tank. For several decades he served as a member either of the Board, or of the Advisory Council, of the Minnesota Chapter of the United Nations Association.

In 1996 Schwartzberg was one of the handful of activists who founded the Minnesota Alliance of Peacemakers, which has since grown into an umbrella institution with roughly eighty peace and justice organizational members. In the following year he was a co-founder of the aforementioned Kashmir Study Group. In 1999, he was the annual honoree of the Vincent J. Hawkinson Foundation, an entity promoting peace and justice activism in five states of the Upper Midwest of the United States.

=== After Retirement ===
Following his formal retirement from the University of Minnesota, in 2000, Schwartzberg focused more heavily on issues of global governance, working largely with several organizations already named – writing scores of op-ed essays for their respective journals – and with the Academic Council on the United Nations System in whose journal he published papers on UN peacekeeping and weighted voting. He expanded his advocacy of the latter idea in a monograph published in 2004 by the World Federalist Movement – Institute for Global Policy, Revitalizing the United Nations System: Reform through Weighted Voting. A related monograph, Creating a World Parliamentary Assembly: An Evolutionary Journey, was published by the Berlin-based Committee for a Democratic United Nations in 2012. The ideas in these two monographs and in many previous articles were brought together – along with many others – in a book, Transforming the United Nations System: Designs for a Workable World, published by the United Nations University Press in 2013. That work provides a comprehensive set of proposals for moving away from the Westphalian paradigm of unfettered state sovereignty on which the present system of global governance is predicated. Despite – or perhaps because of – its radical nature, Schwartzberg's most recent book has been warmly endorsed by leading global thinkers, including Boutros Boutros-Ghali, Thomas Pickering, Brian Urquhart, Thomas Weiss, Johan Galtung, Alfred de Zayas and many others. Schwartzberg's editor at the United Nations University Press wrote to him shortly before publication:

I don't think we've ever had a book with so much praise and backing from such a prestigious group of endorsers.

The Press then made Schwartzberg its first nominee ever for the prestigious Grawemeyer Award for Ideas Improving World Order. (He did not win, however.)

In 2001, Schwartzberg and his fellow peace and justice activist, Louise Pardee, entered into a domestic partnership and he moved from his cramped apartment in Minneapolis to Louise's spacious lakeside home in suburban White Bear Lake. Since then, Louise has contributed to Schwartzberg's work in many ways.

=== The Workable World Trust ===
In December 2014, Schwartzberg established The Workable World Trust, the principal purpose of which is to disseminate and promote the many global governance proposals in his most recent book, with provision to carry on that work after his demise. The trust has negotiated translations of the book into Arabic, Chinese, French, German, Japanese, Russian and Spanish, thereby facilitating virtually worldwide discussion of its reform recommendations. Additionally a much shorter, less academic Study and Discussion Guide has been prepared for each translation. All but the Japanese have already been published as of 2018.

The trust has supported many projects in addition to those noted above, with beneficiaries in every continent. It has sponsored major conferences, such as the “Creating a Workable World” conference (University of Minnesota, 2015), the “Seminar on Security Council Reform” (UN Church Center, New York, 2016), and the “Commonwealth of Nations as a Vehicle for Sustainable Peace & Development” conference (Brisbane, Australia, 2018). It has also contributed substantial funds in support of conferences and reform advocacy by like-minded groups (e.g. The World Federalist Movement, the Berlin-based Democracy Without Borders, the Brussels-based Center for United Nations Constitutional Research), and provided travel support for youth participation at the Ventotene Seminar in Italy and a Model UN program in Mexico City. It is also the principal financial backer of the “UN2020” initiative for a General Assembly-backed effort to institute a major reform process to mark the 75th anniversary of the UN's founding. The trust has also endowed a Workable World lecture series through the year 2025 in conjunction with the prestigious Nobel Peace Prize Forum, held each year at Augsburg University in Minneapolis. Further, Schwartzberg has bequeathed to Augsburg his personal global governance book collection, along with a fund for the enlargement of his bequest.

Management of the trust is shared mainly with the extraordinarily efficient Nancy Dunlavy, who took over the directorship in December 2017, when Schwartzberg formally assumed the title of director emeritus.

Schwartzberg has had a remarkably rich and rewarding life. He has sought to lead that life as a World Citizen, in both word and deed. He has demonstrated his willingness to tackle big projects and his ability to bring many of them to successful conclusions, at times independently and at times as part of a team. He has been recognized for the rigor, originality, and social value of his scholarship. He has put forward detailed and practicable proposals for improving global governance through peaceful evolutionary processes. He recognizes that humans are fallible and that utopia is not attainable. But a workable world is. He hopes that his work and that of the Workable Word Trust – which will outlive him – will contribute significantly toward the achievement of that goal and encourage others to join in the struggle to bring it to fruition.

== Selected works ==
- 1978: Historical Atlas of South Asia. University of Chicago.
- 2013: Transforming the United Nations System: Designs for a Workable World

== Awards and recognition ==
- Watumull Prize, American Historical Association, 1980
- Outstanding Achievement Award, American Association of Geographers, 1984
- Award for Global Engagement, University Of Minnesota, 2009
- Distinguished International Professor Emeritus, University of Minnesota, 2009
- Director Emeritus, The Workable World Trust, 2018
