= Watumull Prize =

Biennial literary award

The Watumull Prize (1945–82) was established in 1944 to recognize "the best book on the history of India originally published in the United States".

== Recipients ==
Year	Laureate	Book	Publisher
1982	Tapan Raychaudhuri and Irfan Habib, eds.,	The Cambridge Economic History of India, Volume 1: c. 1200–c. 1750	Cambridge University Press
1980	Joseph E. Schwartzberg	A Historical Atlas of South Asia	University of Chicago Press
1978	John R. McLane	Indian Nationalism and the Early Congress	Princeton University Press
1976	Michael Pearson	Merchants and Rulers in Gujarat: The Response of the Portuguese in the Sixteenth Century	University of California Press
1974	Leonard A. Gordon	Bengal: The Nationalist Movement, 1876–1940	Columbia University Press
1972	Elizabeth Whitcombe	Agrarian Conditions in Northern India, vol. 1: The United Provinces Under British Rule, 1860–1900	University of California Press
1970	Stephen N. Hay	Asian Ideas of East and West: Tagore and His Critics in Japan, China, and India	Harvard University Press
1970	David Kopf	British Orientalism and the Bengal Renaissance: The Dynamics of Indian Modernization, 1773–1835	University of California Press
1970	Eugene F. Irschick	Politics and Social Conflict in South India: The Non-Brahman Movement and Tamil Separatism, 1916–1929	University of California Press
1968	John Broomfield	Elite Conflict in a Plural Society: Twentieth Century Bengal	University of California Press
1968	Myron Weiner	Party Building in a New Nation	University of Chicago Press
1966	B. R. Nayar	Minority Politics in the Punjab	Princeton University Press
1966	Thomas R. Metcalf	The Aftermath of Revolt: India, 1857–1970	Princeton University Press
1964	Charles A. Drekmeier	Kingship and Community in Early India	Stanford University Press
1964	Charles H. Heimsmith	Indian Nationalism and Hindu Social Reform	Princeton University Press
1962	George D. Bearce	British Attitudes Toward India, 1784–1858	Oxford University Press
1962	Stanley A. Wolpert	Tilak and Gokhale: Revolution and Reform in the Making of Modern India	University of California Press
1960	Michael Brecher	Nehru: A Political Biography	Oxford University Press
1958	William de Bary, ed.,	Sources of the Indian Tradition	Columbia University Press
1954	D. Mackenzie Brown	The White Umbrella: Indian Political Thought from Manu to Gandhi	University of California Press
1954	W. Norman Brown	The United States and India and Pakistan	Harvard University Press
1951	T. Walter Wallbank	India in the New Era	Scott Foresman
1951	Louis Fischer	The Life of Mahatma Gandhi	Harper
1951	Gertrude Emerson Sen	The Pageant of Indian History, vol. I	Longman
1945	Ernest J. H. Mackay	Chanhu-Daro Excavations, 1935–36	American Oriental Society

== See also ==
- List of history awards
