= South Asia Research =

- Discipline: South Asia Studies
- Language: English
- Edited by: Werner Menski

Publication details
- History: Feb 1998
- Publisher: SAGE Publications
- Frequency: Triannually
- Impact factor: 0.8 (2022)

Standard abbreviations
- ISO 4: South Asia Res.

Indexing
- ISSN: 0262-7280 (print); 1741-3141 (web)

Links
- Journal homepage; Online access; Online archive

The South Asia Research is a triannual peer-reviewed academic journal covering the history, politics, law, economics, sociology, visual culture, languages, and literature of the countries in South Asia, shaped by the history of the Indian subcontinent. It is published by SAGE Publications.

== Abstracting and indexing ==
The journal is abstracted and indexed in:

- ProQuest
- International Bibliography of the Social Sciences
- Scopus
- EBSCO databases
- Emerging Sources Citation Index
- Bibliography of Asian Studies
