= Baldev Raj Nayar =

Indian-born Canadian political scientist

Baldev Raj Nayar (October 26, 1931 – February 9, 2021) was an Indian-born Canadian academic. He was professor emeritus of political science at McGill University from 1991 to 2021. He joined McGill University as an assistant professor in 1964. He was born in Punjab (India) on 26 October 1931, and received his Ph.D. from the University of Chicago in 1963.

His works on Indian politics and Indian Political Economy have been very influential. His research on Globalization and its impact on various domains of governance has influenced a generation of scholars and policy makers.

His book Minority Politics in the Punjab won the Watumull Prize in 1966. He was also a regular contributor to Asian Survey, Economic and Political Weekly and India Review.

== Works ==
=== Academic ===
- Globalization and India's Economic Integration (2014).
- The Myth of the Shrinking State: Globalization and the State in India (2009).
- Globalization and Politics in India, editor (2007).
- India's Globalization: Evaluating the Economic Consequences (2006).
- The Geopolitics of Globalization (2005).
- India in the World Order: Searching for Major-Power Status, co-author (2003).
- India and the Major Powers After Pokhran II (2001).
- Globalization and Nationalism: The Changing Balance in India's Economic Policy, 1950-2000 (2001).
- "Political Structure and India's Economic Reforms of the 1990s," Pacific Affairs 71.3 (1998).
- State and Market in India's Shipping: Nationalism, Globalization and Marginalization (1996).
- The State and International Aviation in India: Performance and Policy on the Eve of Aviation Globalization (1994).
- Superpower Dominance and Military Aid: A Study of Military Aid to Pakistan (1991).
- The Political Economy of India's Public Sector: Policy and Performance (1990).
- India's Mixed Economy: The Role of Ideology and Interest in Its Development (1989).
- India's Quest for Technological Independence: Volume I: Policy Foundation and Policy Change (1983).
- India's Quest for Technological Independence: Volume II: The Results of Policy (1983).
- American Geopolitics and India (1976).
- "Political Mainsprings of Economic Planning in the New Nations," Comparative Politics 6.3 (1975).
- "Treat India Seriously," Foreign Policy 18 (1975).
- Violence and Crime in India: A Quantitative Study (1975).
- The Modernization Imperative and Indian Planning (1972).
- National Communication and Language Policy in India (1969).
- Minority Politics in the Punjab (1966).

=== Autobiographical ===
- Overcoming Tragedy: The Story of One Refugee Before and After the Partition of the Punjab (2019).
