= History of Cartography Project =

US university publishing project

The History of Cartography Project is a publishing project in the Department of Geography at the University of Wisconsin–Madison. It was founded by David Woodward in 1981. Woodward directed the project until his death in August 2004; Matthew H. Edney became director in July 2005.

== The History of Cartography ==
The Project works to prepare The History of Cartography, a multivolume series established by Woodward and Brian Harley. This effort is funded by generous grants from the National Endowment for the Humanities, the National Science Foundation, various private foundations, and numerous individuals.

The six volumes of the History, all published by the University of Chicago Press, are:

- 1. Harley, J. B. and David Woodward. (eds.). Cartography in Prehistoric, Ancient, and Medieval Europe and the Mediterranean. 1987. ISBN 9780226316338
- 2.1. Harley, J. B. and David Woodward. (eds.). Cartography in the Traditional Islamic and South Asian Societies. 1992. ISBN 9780226316352
- 2.2. Harley, J. B. and David Woodward. (eds.). Cartography in the Traditional East and Southeast Asian Societies. 1994. ISBN 9780226316376
- 2.3. Woodward, David and G. Malcolm Lewis. (eds.). Cartography in the Traditional African, American, Arctic, Australian, and Pacific Societies. 1998. ISBN 9780226907284
- 3. Woodward, David. (ed.). Cartography in the European Renaissance. 2007. In two parts. ISBN 9780226907321
- 4. Edney, Matthew H. and Mary S. Pedley. (eds.). Cartography in the European Enlightenment. In preparation for publication in December 2019. In two parts.
- 5. Kain, Roger J. P. (ed.). Cartography in the Nineteenth Century. In preparation. In two parts.
- 6. Monmonier, Mark. Cartography in the Twentieth Century. 2015. In two parts. ISBN 9780226534695

== History ==
Harley and Woodward's initial scheme was for a four-volume series, each volume to contain several full-length chapters by different authors, all to be published by 1992. This plan was followed for Volumes 1 through 3, but as the scope of the project grew Volume 2 was divided into three physical parts, and Volume 3 into two parts. The growth of Volume 3 to have been larger than the entire series as originally conceived demonstrated how unfeasible the established format would be for what was now planned as the final three volumes, dealing with the modern period. Woodward therefore decided, after much consultation, to turn the volumes into interpretive encyclopedias.

In July 2011 it began to be made available online as PDF files.

== See also ==
- History of cartography – Evolution of the art and science of mapmaking
