= John Brian Harley =

English geographer, cartographer, and map historian

J. Brian Harley
- Born: 24 July 1932; Ashley, Gloucestershire, United Kingdom
- Died: 20 December 1991 (aged 59); Milwaukee, Wisconsin, United States
- Occupation: Geographer

(John) Brian Harley (24 July 1932 – 20 December 1991) was a geographer, cartographer, and map historian at the universities of Birmingham, Liverpool, Exeter and Wisconsin–Milwaukee. He helped found the History of Cartography Project and was the founding co-editor of the resulting The History of Cartography. In recent years, Harley's work has gained broad prominence among geographers and social theorists, and it has contributed greatly to the emerging discipline of critical cartography.

== Biography ==
Harley was born in Ashley, Gloucestershire. From 1943 to 1950 he attended Brewood Grammar School near Wolverhampton. After national service, Harley gained a place at Birmingham University in 1952. After gaining his Dip Ed from University College, Oxford in 1956, he returned to Birmingham, gaining a PhD in 1960 for work on the historical geography of medieval Warwickshire.

Harley married Amy Doreen in 1957. He began teaching at Queensbridge School, Moseley, but was offered an assistant lecturership in geography at Liverpool University and took up the post in January 1959. In Liverpool Harley turned to the history of cartography, producing Christopher Greenwood, County Map-Maker (1962).

In 1969 Harley resigned from Liverpool to become an editor with publishers David and Charles in Newton Abbot. Harley commissioned a number of works, but by March 1970 he was appointed as a lecturer at the University of Exeter, becoming Montefiore Reader in 1972. In 1972, he published Maps for the local historian, which introduced the use of maps to many amateur historians.

His main focus at Exeter was the history of the Ordnance Survey. He produced notes for the David and Charles reprints of the first edition one-inch maps, wrote Ordnance Survey Maps: a Descriptive Manual (1975), and a substantial part of the official history of the Ordnance Survey (1978).

From the 1970s Harley turned to a philosophical view of maps. In 1985 he was awarded a DLitt by the University of Birmingham.

Harley served on the council of the Institute of British Geographers (1971–74). But despite his academic distinction, he didn't secure promotion in Britain. After the death of his wife and son, Harley relocated to the United States in 1986, when he was appointed professor of geography at the University of Wisconsin–Milwaukee. Here he worked on the multi-volume History of Cartography with David Woodward. He was also involved in controversies over the Columbus celebrations, writing Maps and the Columbian Encounter (1990), and was due to give twelve public lectures on the topic in 1992.

Harley died suddenly of a heart attack on 20 December 1991. He was cremated in Milwaukee, and his ashes were interred at Newton Abbot, Devon. Shortly before he died he proposed a new book combining a selection of essays, eventually published in 2001 as The New Nature of Maps (ed. P. Laxton).

== Legacy ==
The J. B. Harley Research Trust was set up in London in 1992. This trust provides Harley Fellowships to permit scholars from around the world to conduct advanced research in the history of cartography at archives and libraries throughout the United Kingdom.

== Bibliography ==
- Harley, J. B. (1964). The Historian's Guide to Ordnance Survey maps.
- Harley, J. B. (1972). Maps for the Local Historian: a Guide to the British Sources. National Council Social Service. ISBN 0-7199-0834-5.
- Harley, J. B. (1975). Ordnance Survey Maps: a descriptive manual. Southampton: Ordnance Survey. ISBN 0-3190-0000-1.
- Harley, J. B.; O'Donoghue, Yolande, eds. (1975). The Old Series Ordnance Survey Maps of England and Wales: Scale 1 Inch to 1 Mile: A Reproduction of the 110 Sheets of the Survey in Early State in 10 Volumes: Volume I. Kent, Essex, E. Sussex and S. Suffolk. Kent: Harry Margary. ISBN 0-903541-01-7.
- Harley, J. B.; O'Donoghue, Yolande, eds. (1977). The Old Series Ordnance Survey Maps of England and Wales Volume 2: Devon, Cornwall and West Somerset. Lympne Castle: Harry Margary. ISBN 0-903541-02-5.
- J. B. Harley; Barbara Bartz Petchenik; Lawrence W. Towner (1978). Mapping the American Revolutionary War (The Kenneth Nebenzahl Jr. Lectures in the History of Cartography). Chicago and London: University of Chicago Press. ISBN 0-226-31631-9.
- Harley, J. B. (1979). Ordnance Survey and Land Use Mapping: Parish Books of Reference and the County Series 1: 2500 Maps, 1855–1918 (Historical Geography Research Series). Lancaster: Geo Books. ISBN 0-86094-037-3.
- Harley, J. B. (1986). The Old Series Ordnance Survey Maps of England and Wales, Central England: Vol.4. Kent: Harry Margary. ISBN 0-903541-04-1.
- Harley, J. B.; Woodward, David, eds. (1987). The History of Cartography Volume 1: Cartography in Prehistoric, Ancient, and Medieval Europe and the Mediterranean. Chicago and London: University of Chicago Press. ISBN 0-226-31633-5.
- Harley, J. B.; Oliver, R. R. (1992). Old Series Ordnance Survey Wales. Kent: Harry Margary. ISBN 978-0-903541-44-2.
- Harley, J. B.; Woodward, David, eds. (1992). The History of Cartography Volume 2, Book 1: Cartography in the Traditional Islamic and South Asian Societies. Chicago and London: University of Chicago Press. ISBN 0-226-31635-1.
- Harley, J. B.; Woodward, David, eds. (1994). The History of Cartography Volume 2, Book 2: Cartography in the Traditional East and Southeast Asian Societies. Chicago and London: University of Chicago Press. ISBN 0-226-31637-8.
- Harley, J. B.; Woodward, David, eds. (1998). The History of Cartography Volume 2, Book 3: Cartography in the Traditional African, American, Arctic, Australian, and Pacific Societies [Full text of the Introduction by David Woodward and G. Malcolm Lewis]. Chicago and London: University of Chicago Press. ISBN 0-226-90728-7.
- Harley, J. B. (2001). Laxton, Paul (ed.). The New Nature of Maps: Essays in the History of Cartography. Baltimore: Johns Hopkins University Press. ISBN 0-8018-6566-2.
