= Outline of cartography =

Overview of and topical guide to cartography

The following outline is provided as an overview of and topical guide to cartography:

Cartography (also called mapmaking) – study and practice of making and using maps or globes. Maps have traditionally been made using pen and paper, but the advent and spread of computers has revolutionized cartography.

== Essence of cartography ==
- Atlas
- Globe
- Map
- Map collection

== Branches of cartography ==
- Celestial cartography
- Planetary cartography

=== Approaches in cartography ===
- Cartographic generalization
- Cartographic labeling
- Critical cartography
- Terrain cartography

=== Interdisciplinary fields involving cartography ===
- Geodesy
- Geomatics
- Topography

== Cartography by region ==
- Cartography of Africa
- Cartography of Asia
  - Cartography of China
  - Cartography of India
  - Cartography of Israel
  - Cartography of Palestine
- Cartography of Europe
  - Cartography of France
  - Cartography of Switzerland
  - Cartography of Ukraine
- Cartography of Latin America
- Cartography of North America
  - Cartography of Jamaica
  - Cartography of the United States
- Cartography of Oceania
  - Cartography of New Zealand

== Types of maps ==
- Cartogram
- City map
- Contour map
- Dymaxion map
- Electronic map
- Fantasy map
- Geological map
- Nautical chart
- Pictorial maps
- Plan
- Plat
- Reversed map
- Road atlas
- Street map
- Thematic map
- Topographic map
- World map

=== Map projections ===
Map projection

- List of map projections
- Orthographic projection in cartography

== History of cartography ==
History of cartography

- Cartographic expeditions to Greenland
- History of geography
  - Chinese geography
  - List of Graeco-Roman geographers
  - Geography and cartography in medieval Islam
- Majorcan cartographic school

== Cartography in politics ==
- Cartographic aggression
- Cartographic censorship
- Cartographic propaganda

== Cartography-related organizations ==
- National mapping agency
- British Cartographic Society
- Cartography and Geographic Information Society
- International Cartographic Association
- National Cartographic Center of Iran
- North American Cartographic Information Society

== Persons influential in cartography ==
- List of cartographers

=== Cartography scholars ===
- Cynthia Brewer—theorist of digital cartography's design
- Edward Tufte—general information design principles

== See also ==
- Global Positioning System
- Navigation
- Maps
