= Mani Singh Rawat =

Indian explorer

Man Singh Rawat, commonly known as Mani Compassi, was one of the famous Indian explorers (called pundits by the British), who played a significant role in the exploration of Central Asia during the "Great Game" between the British and Russians in the second half of the 19th century. Mani Singh was the older brother of Krishna Singh Rawat and older cousin of Nain Singh Rawat, both famous explorers and cartographers, who worked in the Great Trigonometrical Survey of India. Man Singh was born to a trader named Deb Singh Rawat, in Milam village on India-China border now in present-day Pithoragarh district.

== See also ==
- Kumauni People
- Shauka - Johar
- List of explorers
- Cartography of India
