= Kishen Singh (explorer) =

Indian explorer

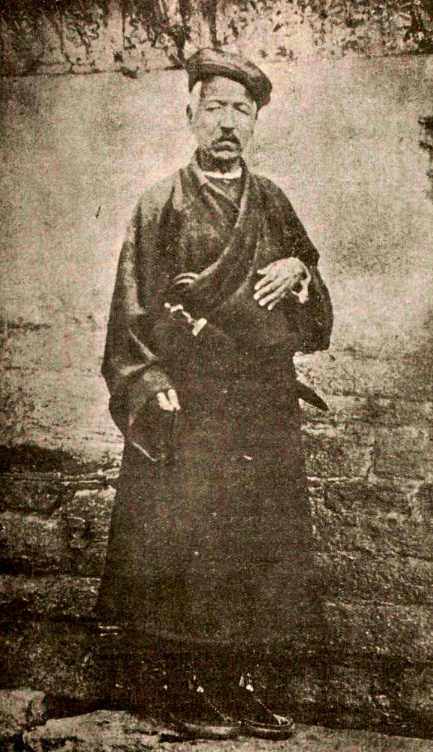
- Born: c. 1850; Milam, India
- Died: 1921 (aged 70–71); Moradabad
- Occupations: Asian explorer

Rai Bahadur Kishen Singh or Krishna (c. 1850–1921) was a native Indian explorer, termed a pundit by the British, who was employed by the Survey of India. His code-name was 'A.K.' and his accomplishments would rival those of his famous cousin Nain Singh (code-named 'The Pundit').

== Early life ==
He was born to a trader named Deb Singh. He was born at Milam village on India-China border now in present-day Pithoragarh district. His elder brother was Mani Singh. His cousin Nain Singh was also an explorer.

== Education (1862–1867) ==
Singh simultaneous studied and worked as assistant at the Garbyang government school in the Dharchula area, and later progressed to obtain the Tehsil Mudarisi diploma from the Normal School at Almora. He taught at Milam Girls' School and the Garbyang government school.

== Explorer (1867–1885) ==
Hired and trained by the Geological Survey of India's Dehradun office, Singh then participated in the Great Trigonometrical Survey, and later became a trainer for the survey. James Walker, the superintendent of the survey, took him and his cousin Nain Singh on expeditions of Tibet and Central Asia. He was part of the several important expeditions listed below.

1. 1869 Kailash-Mansarovar expedition.
2. 1871–1872 Shigache–Lhasa expedition.
3. 1873–1874 Yarkand–Kashgar expedition, second expedition of this area by Sir Thomas Douglas Forsyth.
4. 1878–1882 Darjeeling–Lhasa–Mongolia expedition, stayed in Lhasa for a year masquerading as a merchant, surveyed Mekong, Salween, and Irrawaddy rivers.

He was also the first person to map the Ramgarh crater on a finer scale of (1 : 63,360).

== Retirement and death (1885–1921) ==
Singh retired in 1885. In 1913 he became a guardian patron of the "Johar Upkarini Mahasabha" grassroot development co-operative society of the Johar Valley. He died in February 1921.

== Honors ==
He received the following:

1. Royal Geographical Society, an inscribed gold watch and 500 Indian rupees.
2. Paris Geographical Society, a gold medal.
3. Italian Geographic Society, a gold medal.
4. British government of India, title of Rai Bahadur.
5. British government of India: with a grant of jagir by British in Sitapur district of present-day Uttar Pradesh with annual revenue of INR1850.

== See also ==
- Garhwali people
- Kumauni people
- Shauka - Johar
- List of explorers
- Cartography of India
