= Nain Singh =

Pundit who explored the Himalayas for the British

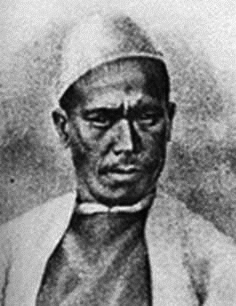
- Nain Singh
- Born: 21 October 1830; Pithoragarh, Kumaon Division, British India
- Died: 1 February 1882 (aged 51); Moradabad, Uttar Pradesh, British India
- Occupations: Asian explorer

Nain Singh Rawat (21 October 1830 – 1 February 1882), (Note: The dates are tentative. The date of birth is based on the Google Doodle issued in 2017. The date of death is based on an obituary letter where Col. Edmund Smyth notes in April 1882 that Nain Singh died of cholera at Moradabad around the "1st of February last". He mentions an obituary in "the Times" dated 15 March.) was one of the first Indian explorers (dubbed "pundits") employed by the British to explore the Himalayas and Central Asia. He came from the Johar Valley in Kumaon. He surveyed the trade route through Ladakh to Tibet, determined the location and altitude of Lhasa in Tibet, and surveyed a large section of Brahmaputra. His reports were initially made under the code name Number 9. He walked "1,580 miles, or 3,160,000 paces, each counted."

== Early life ==
Nain Singh Rawat was born to Lata Burha in 1830 in Milam village, a Bhotia village at the foot of the Milam glacier on the India-China border in present day Uttarakhand state of India. Milam is in the Johar Valley, one of the Bhotia abodes in the Kumaon division, where the river Goriganga originates. The Rawats ruled over the Johar Valley, during the reign of Chand dynasty in Kumaon; this was followed by the Gorkha rule. In 1816 the British defeated the Gorkhas but maintained a policy of non-interference and friendship towards the Johar Bhotias. The famous Bhotia explorers mostly belong to the villages of Johar.

After leaving school, Nain Singh helped his father. He visited different centres in Tibet with him, learned the Tibetan language, customs and manners and became familiar with the Tibetan people. This knowledge of the Tibetan language, local customs, and protocol came in handy in Nain Singh's work as a "spy explorer". Due to the extreme cold conditions, Milam and other villages of the upper Johar valley are inhabited only for a few months from June to October. During this time the men used to visit Gya'nyima, Gartok and other markets in Western Tibet.

== Schlagintweit expedition ==
Singh traveled to Ladakh in 1856 along with family members Mani and Dolpha Singh, accompanying an expedition by Hermann, Adolf, and Robert Schlagintweit. He learned the use of survey instruments during this expedition. The Schlagintweit brothers planned to send Nain and Mani Singh to Lhasa as well, but in the end, that expedition did not take place. They also wanted to take Singh with them back to Europe, but he declined. Adolf Schlagintweit wrote a letter of recommendation for Nain and Mani which they later presented to British survey officials.

== British Tibetan expeditions ==
=== Context ===
The East India Company, and later the British Empire, sought to form trade relations with Tibet. Additionally, exploration of Central Asia and Tibet were of particular interest during the Great Trigonometric Survey of India because their geography was largely unknown to the British. However, Qing China closed Tibet's borders after gaining significant control over Tibet's internal politics following the 1791 Sino-Nepalese War. A number of Europeans tried to reach Lhasa from India over the next hundred years; however, few successfully reached it, and local officials turned back most attempts at entry. A British attempt to reach Tibet from the east by travelling up the Yangtse River failed in 1861, and Edmund Smyth's attempts to enter Tibet from the west between 1861 and 1863 all failed as well. Because of the Great Trigonometrical Survey's past success with native surveyors, Thomas Montgomerie (the astronomical assistant of the survey), proposed that native explorers be recruited to explore Central Asia and Tibet. Montgomerie's plan was approved in 1862, and his first recruits were Abdul Hamid for an expedition to Yarkand, followed by Nain Singh and his cousin Mani Singh for an expedition to Lhasa.

=== Recruitment and training ===
In an 1861 letter, Smyth recommended Singh as a possible surveyor to Walker. Walker travelled to meet with Singh and recruit him and his cousin Mani. The two were sent to Dehradun, the Survey's headquarters, and placed under Montgomerie's command. The two would spend two years training for their expeditions, learning a number of surveying techniques. Because the survey needed to be clandestine, a number of techniques were developed to hide the surveying. Mercury for thermometers was hidden in the bottom of a bowl, notes were stored inside a prayer wheel, and survey gear was hidden inside the luggage. A string of prayer beads, which usually had 108 beads, was modified to only have 100 beads; the pundits were trained to move one bead every hundred paces to count their steps. They were also trained to have a precise stride length of 33 inches across varying terrain.

=== First expedition ===
Singh's first expedition began in 1865. He and Mani separated during the survey, with Mani travelling through western Tibet and Nain walking to Lhasa. Nain Singh reached Lhasa on 10 January 1866. He spent some time in Lhasa as a teacher of accounts before returning to India. During this expedition, Nain Singh estimated the altitude of Lhasa as 3,420 meters by boiling water; this was close to the actual value of 3,540 meters. He also estimated the position of Lhasa with celestial observations.

=== Second expedition ===
Singh's second expedition explored western Tibet in 1867. Nain and Mani were accompanied by Kalian Singh, Nain's brother, and the three disguised themselves as Bashahri traders. The expedition reached the goldfield at Thok Jalung, mapped the Sutlej river, performed an 850-mile-long route survey, and verified the position of Gartok.

=== Third expedition ===
Singh's third and final expedition returned to Lhasa via a more northern route than his first expedition and ran from 1873 to 1875.

=== Surveys ===
During his secret survey of Tibet, Nain Singh was the first non-Tibetan to visit many legendary areas of Tibet, including the Thok Jalung goldfields on 26 August 1867. He would later say that Thok Jalung was the coldest place he had ever visited.

Nain Singh was a cousin of Kishen Singh, another famous pundit explorer.

== Legacy ==
Map of Nain Singh's exploration of Tibet

In May 1877, Singh was awarded the Royal Geographical Society's Patron's Medal "for his great journeys and Surveys in Tibet and along the Upper Brahmaputra, he has determined the position of Lhasa, and positive knowledge of the map of Asia." Henry Yule received the award on Singh's behalf and in his acceptance speech said that "[Singh's] observations have added a larger amount of important knowledge to the map of Asia than those of any other living man."

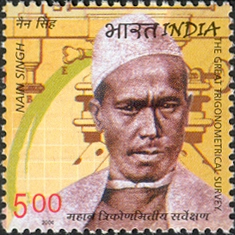
Nain Singh Rawat, 2004 stamp of India.

On 27 June 2004, an Indian postage stamp featuring Nain Singh was issued commemorating his role in the Great Trigonometric Survey of India. In 2006, Shekhar Pathak and Uma Bhatt brought out a biography of Nain Singh with three of his diaries and the RGS articles about his travels in three volumes titled Asia ki Peeth Par published by Pahar, Naini Tal.

The mountains south of Lake Pangong are named Nain Singh Range in his memory and honour.

On 21 October 2017, Google celebrated Nain Singh Rawat's 187th birthday with a Google Doodle.

== See also ==
- Shauka - Johar
- Krishna Singh Rawat
- Mani Singh Rawat
- Cartography of India
