= Rangas language =

Extinct Sino-Tibetan language of India

Rangas
- Rangkas
- Native to: India
- Region: Uttarakhand
- Ethnicity: 1,000 Rangkas
- Extinct: early 20th century
- Language family: Sino-Tibetan: Rangas

Language codes
- ISO 639-3: rgk
- Glottolog: rang1266

Surendra Singh Pangtey, a Shauka, narrating a joke in a form of Johari with many Rangas words

Rangas or Rangkas is an extinct West Himalayish language spoken by the Rangkas people of Uttarakhand, India. The Rangkas joined the Kumaoni people and shifted to their language. There is currently an ethnic population of about 1,000 people.

Rangas was spoken in Dharchula and Munsiyari tehsils (facing the Nepal border along the Mahakali valley), Johar Valley, Pithoragarh District, Uttarakhand, India.
