= African map =

African map may refer to:

- Cartography of Africa
- Cyrestis camillus, the African map butterfly
