= Johari dialect =

Dialect of Kumaoni language

Johari
- जोहारी
- Surendra Singh Pangtey narrating a joke in Johari
- Pronunciation: [d͡ʒoːɦɑːɾiː] Johari
- Native to: India
- Region: Johar and Darma valleys, (India)
- Ethnicity: Shauka people
- Language family: Indo-European: Indo-Iranian; Indo-Aryan; Northern; Central Pahari; Kumaoni; Johari

Language codes
- ISO 639-3: –

Johari ([d͡ʒoːɦɑːɾiː]) is a language variety spoken by the Shauka people of India, primarily in the Johar and Darma valley of the state of Uttarakhand. It is generally classified as a dialect of the Kumaoni language, and is also argued to be a distinct language. Sharma (1990) describe Rangas, its predecessor, to be extinct since 1955. Grierson (1916) included Johari as a Kumaoni dialect, calling it "corrupt Kumauni" with an estimated 7,419 speakers having another native language, Rangkas.

== Bibliography ==
- Sharma, D. D. (1990). Tibeto-Himalayan languages of Uttarakhand. 2. Studies in Tibeto-Himalayan languages (1st ed.). Mittal. ISBN 978-81-7099-171-7.
