= Chanvar =

Area in Uttar Pradesh, India

Chanvar fields encompass single plot of 96,000 bhiga of cultivable land without any houses on it. It is part of Gangetic flood plains of Mirzapur district in Uttar Pradesh. (Bhiga means wet or wetted; 1 bhiga = 100 square rods, 3025 square yards or 0.2529 hectares; 96,000 bhiga accordingly encompasses 60,000 acres.)

== See also ==
- Cartography of India
- Great Trigonometric Survey
- Nibi Gaharwar
