= Nibi Gaharwar =

- village
- Location in Uttar Pradesh, India Nibi Gaharwar (India)
- Coordinates: 25.2099100°N 82.3662700°E
- Country: India
- State: Uttar Pradesh
- District: Mirzapur

Area
  - Total: 443.07 km^{2} (171.07 sq mi)

Population
  - Total: 2,567
  - Density: 5.794/km^{2} (15.01/sq mi)

Languages
  - Official: Hindi
- Time zone: UTC+5:30 (IST)
- Postal code: 231303
- Nearest city: mirzapur
- Sex ratio: 925 ♂/♀
- Literacy: 75%%
- Lok Sabha constituency: mirzapur bhadohi
- Vidhan Sabha constituency: Mirzapur City

Nibi Gaharwar is a village in the Mirzapur district of India. The Ganges flows on one side of the village, with Chanvar fields on the other. Agriculture is an important part of the local economy. It is inhabited mainly by Gaharwar Rajputs. It is 33 km from Mirzapur town, and 60 km from Allahabad. The nearest railhead is Gaipura, located on the Delhi Howrah main section. However, few trains halt at Gaipura (Station Code GAE) making Mirzapur (Station Code MZP) a more used rail head. The nearest airports are at Babatpur, Varanasi or Bamrauli airport, Allahabad. The village itself is located on the main stretch of Ganges between Allahabad and Varanasi. Vindhayachal, well known for its Vindhayavasini temple, is a Shakti peeth and also a place from where Indian Standard Time is measured. It is about 20 km from this place and Sitamarhi is about 15 km (provided you cross the Ganges by boat).

Avadhi and Hindi are the languages spoken.
