= Surendra Singh Pangtey =

Indian author and former Indian Army and IAS officer

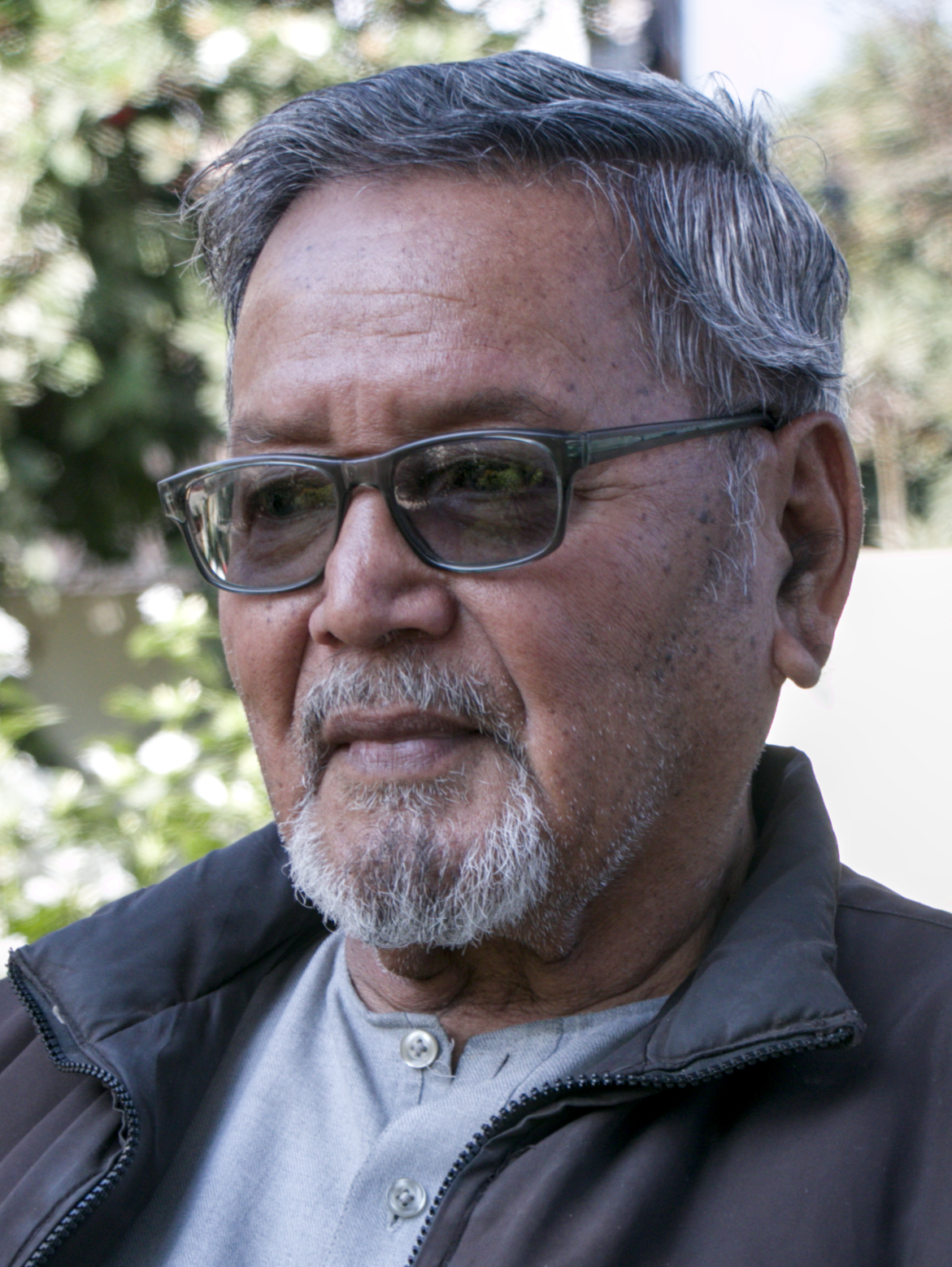
- Pangtey in 2019
- Born: 1 January 1940 (age 86); Munsyari, Uttarakhand, India
- Occupations: Writer, army officer, and civil servant
- Writing career
- Genres: Non-fiction, mythology

Surendra Singh Pangtey (born 1 January 1940) is an Indian author and a former Indian Army and Indian Administrative Service officer. His notable works include Prehistory of Shauka regime, Saga of a native explorer, Śaukā pradeśa kā prāgaitihāsa (in Hindi, 2019), Vāmācāra tantra tathā Pauna tāntrika prathā (in Hindi) and Vamachar Tantra & Ponism. He has studied and published about Rankas (Shaukiya-khun), the now-extinct, traditional language of his native, Shauka community, as well as the currently spoken Johari dialect. In 2000 he established the Tribal Heritage Museum in Munsyari, Uttarakhand to promote the history, culture and tradition of the Bhotiya people.

== Early life and career ==
Pangtey narrating a joke in a form of Johari, a dialect of Kumaoni with many words from the now-extinct Rangas language

Pangtey was born on 1 January 1940 in Munsyari, Pithoragarh district, Uttarakhand, India. He belongs to the Shauka tribe, traditionally residing in the Johar Pargana region. He completed his graduation from Almora before joining the Indian Army, where he served as an Emergency Commissioned Officer in the 3rd Gorkha Rifles. In 1969, he entered the Indian Administrative Service (IAS), serving in the Uttar Pradesh cadre until his retirement.

in 2000 he established the Tribal Heritage Museum, a private museum in Munsiari, showcasing the history, culture and tradition of the Bhotiya people.

== Bibliography ==
- Prehistory of Shauka regime
- Saga of a native explorer
- Śaukā pradeśa kā prāgaitihāsa (2019)
- Vāmācāra tantra tathā Pauna tāntrika prathā
- Vamachar Tantra & Ponism
