= Kumaoni language =

Central Pahari language spoken in Kumaon Division, Uttarakhand

Kumaoni
- कुमाऊँनी
- The word "Kumaoni" written in Kumaoni-Devanagari script
- Pronunciation: [kuːmaːʊ̃ːniː]
- Native to: Uttarakhand
- Region: Kumaon (India); Doti (Nepal)
- Ethnicity: Kumaoni
- Native speakers: 2.0 million (2011 census)
- Language family: Indo-European: Indo-Iranian; Indo-Aryan; Northern; Central Pahari; Kumaoni
- Early form: Khasa Prakrit
- Writing system: Devanagari (Kumaoni alphabet)

Language codes
- ISO 639-3: kfy
- Glottolog: kuma1273
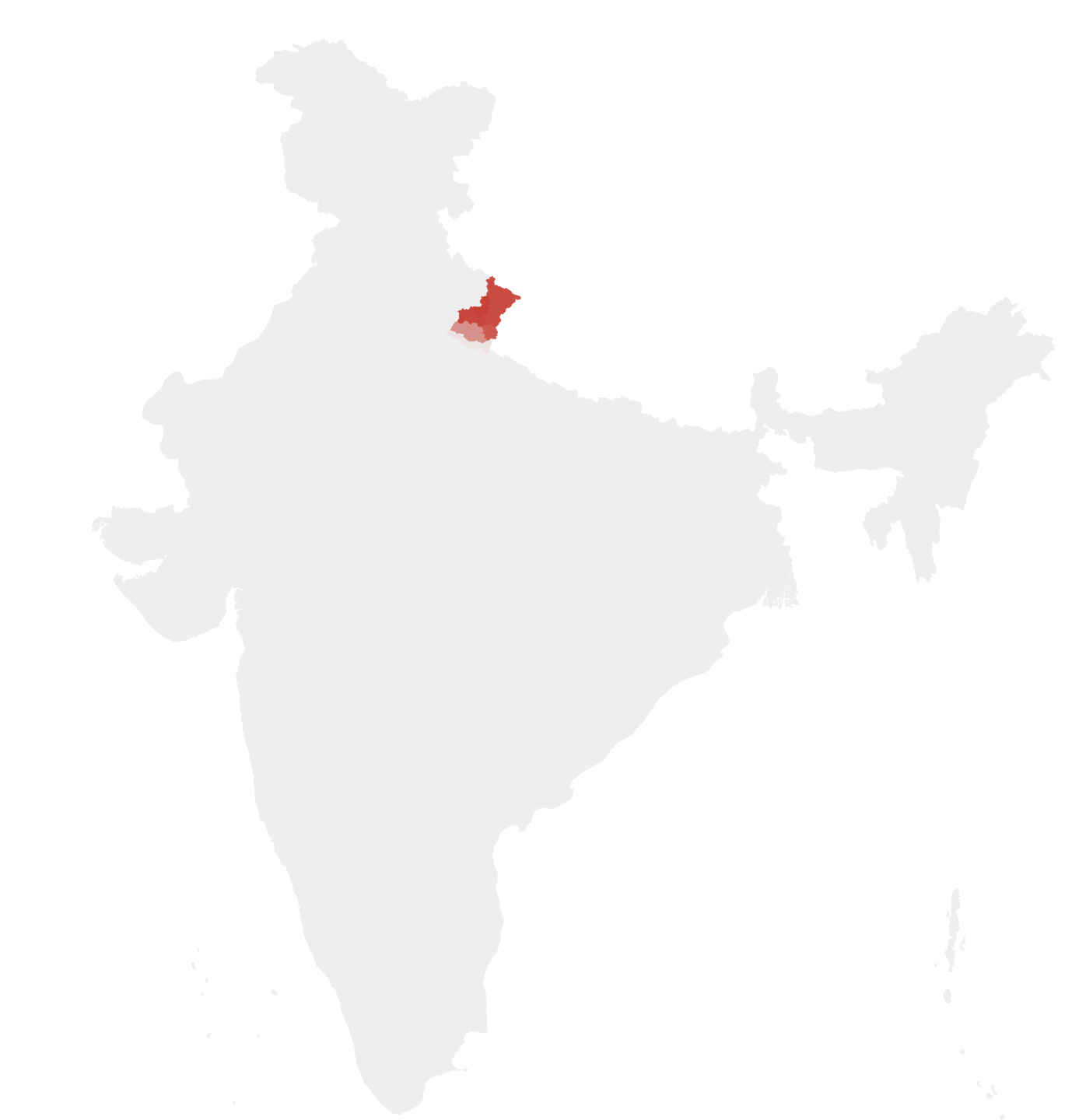
- Kumaoni language speakers in India (2011 census)

Surendra Singh Pangtey narrating the origin story of Shauka people in Johari, a dialect of Kumaoni

Kumaoni (Kumaoni-Devanagari: कुमाऊँनी, pronounced [kuːmaːʊ̃ːniː]) is an Indo-Aryan language spoken by over two million people of the Kumaon region of the state of Uttarakhand in Northern India, and the distant northwestern Sudurpashchim Province of Nepal. As per 1961 survey there were 1,030,254 Kumaoni speakers in India. The number of speakers increased to 2.0 million in 2011.

Doti region of Nepal, where the Kumaoni language is also spoken

Kumaoni is not endangered but UNESCO's Atlas of the World's Languages in Danger designates it as a language in the unsafe category, meaning it requires consistent conservation efforts.

== Script ==
Kumaoni is written using the Devanagari script.

== Geographic distribution and dialects ==
There are several dialects spoken in the Kumaon region. There is not single accepted method of dividing up the dialects of Kumaoni. Broadly speaking, Kali (or Central) Kumaoni is spoken in Almora and northern Nainital. North-eastern Kumaoni is spoken in Pithoragarh. South-eastern Kumaoni is spoken in South-eastern Nainital. Western Kumaoni is spoken west of Almora and Nainital.

More specifically:

KUMAONI DIALECTS
Name	Region
Johari	Malla and Talla Johar Milam, Munsiyari
Askoti	Askot
Bhabhri	Haldwani and Ramnagar
Danpuriya	Danpur, Bageshwar, Kapkot
Gangoli	Ganai-Gangoli, Kanda, Berinag, Gangolihat
Khasparjiya	Almora
Kumaiyya	Champawat
Pachhai	Pali-Pachhhau, Ranikhet, Dwarahat
Phaldakotiya	Phaldkot
Rhau-Chaubyansi	Nainital
Sirali	Sirakot, Didihat
Soriyali	Sor Valley, Pithoragarh

Some Kumaoni speakers are also reportedly found in Western Nepal.

== History ==
Flag of Kumaon Kingdom

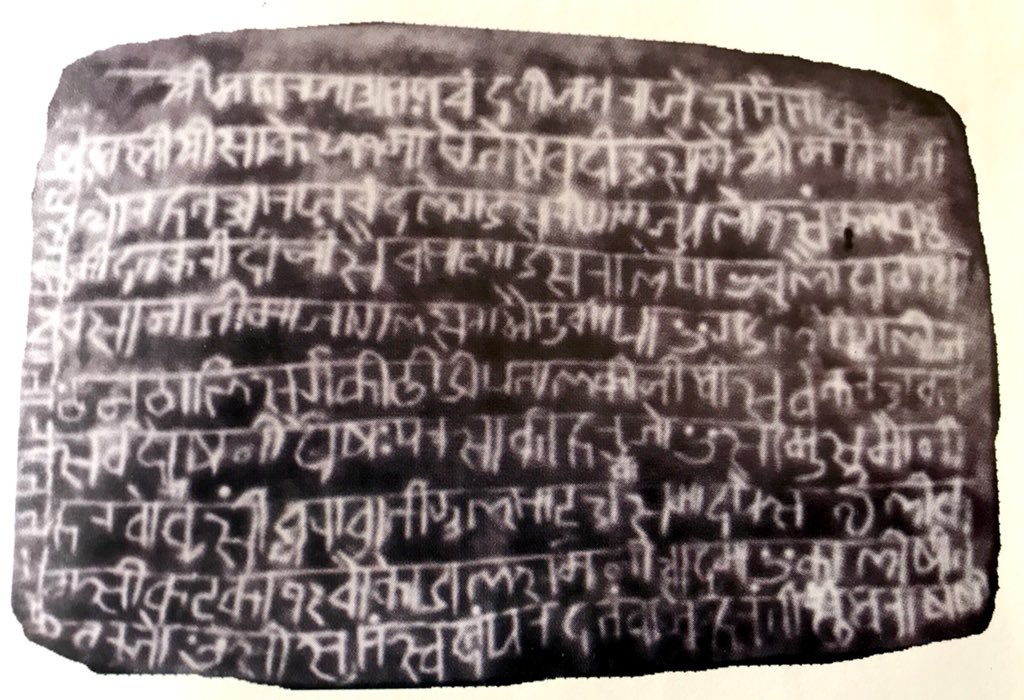
Kumaoni written on an old copper inscription from 989 CE using Devanagari script

Various Kumaoni text have been found from the Katyuri and Chand era on temple stones and as copper plate inscriptions. Kumaoni was also the official language of the Kumaon Kingdom.

== Phonology ==
=== Consonants ===
		Labial	Dental/ Alveolar	Retroflex	Post-alv./ Palatal	Velar	Glottal
Nasal	voiced	m	n	ɳ		ŋ	
Nasal	breathy	mʱ	nʱ				
Stop/ Affricate	voiceless	p	t	ʈ	tʃ	k	
Stop/ Affricate	aspirated	pʰ	tʰ	ʈʰ	tʃʰ	kʰ	
Stop/ Affricate	voiced	b	d	ɖ	dʒ	ɡ	
Stop/ Affricate	breathy	bʱ	dʱ	ɖʱ	dʒʱ	ɡʱ	
Fricative			s		ʃ		h
Rhotic	voiced		r	ɽ			
Rhotic	breathy			ɽʱ			
Lateral	voiced		l	ɭ			
Lateral	breathy		lʱ				
Approximant		w			j		

- /ʃ/ can also be heard as [s] in free variation, depending on the dialect.

=== Vowels ===
	Front	Central	Back
High	iː		uː
High	ɪ		ʊ
Mid	eː	ə	oː
Mid	ɛ	ə	ɔ
Low	(æ)	ɑ ɑː	

- /ɛ/ can be heard as [æ] in free variation.
- /ɑ/ can be heard as either back [ɑ] or central [ä] in free variation.
- /ɔ/ can be heard as [ɒ] in free variation.

== Grammar ==
Being part of the Indo-Aryan dialect continuum Kumaoni shares its grammar with other Indo-Aryan languages like Dotyali, Nepali, Hindi, Rajasthani, Kashmiri and Gujarati. It shares much of its grammar with the other language of the Central Pahari group like Garhwali. The peculiarities of grammar in Kumaoni and other Central Pahari languages exist due to the influence of the now extinct language of the Khasas, the first inhabitants of the region. In Kumaoni the verb substantive is formed from the root ach, as in both Rajasthani and Kashmiri. In Rajasthani its present tense, being derived from the Sanskrit present rcchami, I go, does not change for gender. But in Pahari and Kashmiri it must be derived from the rare Sanskrit particle *rcchitas, gone, for in these languages it is a participial tense and does change according to the gender of the subject. Thus, in the singular we have: - Here we have a relic of the old Khasa language, which, as has been said, seems to have been related to Kashmiri. Other relics of Khasa, again agreeing with north-western India, are the tendency to shorten long vowels, the practice of epenthesis, or the modification of a vowel by the one which follows in the next syllable, and the frequent occurrence of disaspiration. Thus, Khas siknu, Kumaoni sikhno, but Hindi sikhna, to learn; Kumaoni yeso, plural yasa, of this kind.

Language Comparison
	Khas-kura (Nepali)		Kumauni		Kashmiri
to be	Masc	Fem	Masc	Fem	Masc	Fem
1SG	chhu	chhu	chik	chu	chus	ches
2SG	chhas	chhes	chai	chi	chukh	chekh
3SG	chha	chhe	ch	chi	chuh	cheh

=== Verb conjugation ===
Conjugation of the verb Lekh (लेख) to write, in all three tenses in Kumaoni.

==== Present tense ====
Singular	Plural
मैं लेखनू main lekhnu I write	हम लेखनु hum lekhnu we write
तू लेख छे tu lekh chhe you write	तुम लेख छो tum lekh chho you write
उ लिखनो U likhno he writes	ऊँ लेखन छन un lekhan chhan they write

==== Past tense ====
Singular	Plural
मेल लिखौ maile lekho I wrote	हमुल लेखौ humul lekho we wrote
त्वील लिखौ tveel lekho you wrote	तुमुल लेखौ tumule lekho you wrote
वील लिखौ veel lekho he wrote	उनुले लेखौ unule lekho they wrote

==== Future tense ====
Singular	Plural
मैं लिखूंलो main lekhulo I will write	हम लेखुंला hum lekhula we will write
तू लेखले tum lekhle you will write	तुम लेखला tum lekhla you will write
उ लेखल u lekhal he will write	ऊँ लेखल un lekhal they will write

== Example short phrases ==
Words/phrases	Transliteration	Meaning
जै देव	Jai Dev	Hello Formal.
पैलाग	Pailaag	Hi/Hello (lit. touch your feet as a sign of respect used by younger members to greet older members)
कस हेरे छे?	Kas hare chhe?	How are you? Informal
कस हेरो छा?	Kas haro cha	How are you? Formal
भल हेरो	Bhal hero	I am fine
काँ जाण छा?	kaa jaan chha?	Where are you going
होए	Hoye.	Yes.
ना	Nā.	No.
कतु?	Katu?	How much?/How many?
काँ?	Kajāh?	Where?
कसिक?	Kasik?	How?
कैक?	Kaik?	Whose?
को?	Ko?	Who?
किलै	Kila?	Why?
के?	Ke?	What?
के हेगो?	Ke hego.	What happened?
तुमऱ नौ के छ?	Tumar nau ke che?	What is your name?
बेरे घर (ध्याव ) ऐै जया	Baere dhyav ajayaa	Come home early
आपूं कां बटे आछा?	Aapoun kan bate aachcha?	From where do you come?
को जाल बजार?	Ko jal Baazar	Who will go to market?
ओ बबो	O babo	Oh my god!

== Official status ==
There have been demands to include Kumaoni along with Garhwali in the 8th schedule of the Constitution of India so that it could be made one of the Scheduled Language of India. In 2010, a private member's bill was introduced for discussion in the Lok Sabha whose aim was to include Garhwali and Kumaoni in the Eighth Schedule of the Constitution.

However In a step to promote and protect indigenous languages in December 2019 Government of the state introduced Official Kumaoni Books for Classes 1-5 students of Kumaon division schools.

== Kumaoni literature ==
Kumaoni language has had many noteworthy writers, prominent among them are

- Lokratna Pant or Gumani Pant (1790–1846)
- Gauri Dutt Pant "Gaurda" (1872–1939)
- Charu Chandra Pandey (1923–2017)
- Shailesh Matiyani (1931–2001)
- Mohan Upreti (1925–1997)
- Brijen Lal Shah (1928–1998)

== Media and art ==
=== Films ===
- Megha Aa, (first Kumaoni film). Director Kaka Sharma, Produced S S Bisht, 1987
- Teri Saun, (first film both in Kumaoni and Garhwali), written, produced, and directed by Anuj Joshi, 2003.
- Aapun Biraan (Apne Paraye) by Shri Kartikey Cine Productions. Written by Rajendra Bora (Tribhuvan Giri). Produced by Bhaskar Singh Rawat. 2007.
- Madhuli by Anamika Film, 2008.
- Aapke Liye, a 1985 TV show (aired on Doordarshan) directed by Sharbat Sanzarr and presented by Mohan Manral showcases the Kumaoni mela "kauteek".

=== Theatre ===
Kumaoni theatre which developed through its 'Ramleela' plays, later evolved into a modern theatre form with the efforts of theatre stalwarts like Mohan Upreti, Naima Khan Upreti and Dinesh Pandey, and groups like 'Parvatiya Kala Kendra' (started by Mohan Upreti) and 'Parvatiya Lok Kala Manch'. "Ankhar" of Lucknow did a very good work in the field of Kumaoni theater. Ankhar acted in a number of Kumaoni plays like "mee yo gayun, mee yo satkyun" writer Nand Kumar Upreti, "Punturi" by Charu Chandra Pandey, "Motor Road" by Govind Ballabh Pant, "Labh Ribhadi" writer Nand Kumar Upreti, "Kagare Aag" and "Tumhare Liye" by Himanshu Joshi, Kumauni translation Naveeen Joshi and कुमाउनी नाटक-जैल थै, वील पै.

=== Folk music ===
Folk song genres include ceremonial mandals, martial panwaras and melancholy khuded, thadya, and jhoda.

Musical instruments used in Kumaon music include thedhol, damoun, turri, ransingha, dholki, daur, thali, bhankora, andmasakbhaja. Tabla and harmonium are also used, but to a lesser extent.

Some prominent singers are:

- Mohan Upreti, the most famous personality associated with Kumaoni folk music, who is known for his Nanda Devi Jagar & Rajula Malu Shahi Ballad. He is famous for the great Kumaoni song Bedu Pako Baro Masa which for many years was identified with the hills of Uttarakahand. It is said this song was also a favourite of Pandit Jawahar Lal Nehru who heard it in a band march as this song is also a popular marching song.
- Naima Khan Upreti – she was the wife of Mohan Upreti and was a prominent folk singer. Mohan Upreti and Naima Upreti used to sing folk songs as a duet and they also made the first His Master's Voice recordings of songs like Bedu Pako and O Lali, O Lali Haushiya. Naima Upreti had collected a large number of songs of the Kumaon and Garhwal region and she rendered them on several occasions.
- Gopal Babu Goswami – who is considered to be a legend in Kumaon for his melodious voice. His songs on the life of the members of the armed forces and their families like Kaile baje muruli, Ghughuti na basa (Hirda cassettes) and many others are legendary, it is said that when these songs were transmitted on All India Radio women could not help but weep when they heard the soul touching voice of Gopal Da as he was lovingly called.
- Heera Singh Rana – identified as a contemporary poet and singer who touched upon various shades of hill life, particularly the plight of women. Besides beauty, love, and romance, his poetry illustrates pains and sufferings and are sharp in satire on the political class.

In the early 1990s songs on the turning life style mainly on the one who are heading towards town being made in which meri kumau ki gaadi, hit meri punjaban billo uttarakhand pahara, bwaari tamaaku pija etc. criticize the changing attitude in Kumaoni society, the songs of Mohan Manral straight away criticize of the changing mindset of metropolitan Kumaoni society running away from their roots.

=== Radio ===
- In 1962, a new programme was introduced from Akashwani Lucknow – "Utterayana". This programme was specially for the Chinese border area. Jay dev sharma "kamal" Banshidhar Pathak Jigyasu and Jeet Singh Jardhari started this programme. Najeebabad Akashwani Kendra relayed this programme.
- With the aim to create a common platform for local communities of Supi in Uttarakhand, TERI launched 'Kumaon vani', a community radio service on 11 March 2010. Uttarakhand Governor Margaret Alva inaugurated the community radio station, the first in the state. The 'Kumaon Vani' aims to air programmes on environment, agriculture, culture, weather and education in the local language and with the active participation of the communities. The radio station covers a radius of 10 km reaching out to almost 2000 locals around Mukhteshwar.
- In order to create a folk genome tank of Uttarakhand where one can find each genre and occasions in the form of folk music, and to bring the melodious folk from the heart of Himalaya on global screen, the very first internet radio of Kumaon/Garhwal/Jaunsar was launched in 2008 by a group of non-resident Uttarakhandi from New York, which has been gaining significant popularity among inhabitants and migrants since its beta version was launched in 2010. This was named after a very famous melody of hills of Himalaya, Bedu Pako Baro Masa.

== See also ==
- Kumaon
- Kumauni People
- Kumaon Kingdom
- List of languages by number of native speakers in India
