= Gya'nyima =

Plain in Tibet

Coordinates: 30°48′N 80°42′E

Gyanema or Gya'nyima (Tibetan: རྒྱ་ཉི་མ, Wylie: rgya nyi ma, THL: gya nyi ma) is a large plain at the border between the Zanda County and Burang County in western Tibet, which was once used for an annual market of Indo-Tibetan trade. The border has been sealed and the market shut down since the Sino-Indian War of 1962. At the present time, there is only a small settlement at the western edge of the plain called Xilanta (Chinese: 西兰塔), where China operates a military outpost.

== Geography ==
Indo-Tibetan border near Kumaon and Zanda County

The Gynema plain lies between two tributaries of Lamchang Chu (Tibetan: ལམ་འཕྲང་ཆུ, Wylie: lam 'phrang chu), one in the west that rises below the Darma Pass (and called Darma Yankti by the Indians) and another in the east that rises in the hills further east and forms a large lake called Gago Cuo (Chinese: 嘎果错; pinyin: Gā guǒ cuò) or Gyanema Lake. At the top of the lake on a hillock there was a fort called Gyanemakhar, which is now in ruins. Lamchang Chu drains into the Sutlej River and flows west. Immediately to the south of the Gyanema plain is the basin of the Karnali River, which flows east. Thus the plain itself may be said to form the water divide between Sutlej and Karnali.

The Gyanema market was accessible from all the three Bhotiya valleys of Kumaon. The Joharis accessed it via the triple passes of Unta Dhura, Jainti and Kungribingri passes. The Darmiyas could use the Darma Pass. And, the Byansis of Kuthi Valley could access it via Lympiadhura.

On the Tibetan side, the Gyanema plain was roughly equidistant from the Daba Town and the Burang Town (also called Taklakot). Traders would bring their goods for the annual market from their normal residence. The Tibetan goods were salt, borax, wool, skins, cloth and utensils. They exchanged them for silver, wheat, rice, satoo, ghur, candied sugar, pepper, beads, and other Indian manufactures.

== Bibliography ==
- Kak, Manju (Spring 2001), "Those Who Once Walked Mountains", India International Centre Quarterly, 27/28: 177–192, JSTOR 23005709
- Longstaff, Thomas George (1950), This My Voyage, John Murray – via archive.org
- Sherring, Charles A. (1906), Western Tibet and the British Borderland, T. G. Longstaff, Edward Arnold – via archive.org
