= Cartography of Europe =

The earliest cartographic depictions of Europe are found in early world maps. In classical antiquity, Europe was assumed to cover the quarter of the globe north of the Mediterranean, an arrangement that was adhered to in medieval T and O maps.

Ptolemy's world map of the 2nd century already had a reasonably precise description of southern and western Europe, but was unaware of particulars of northern and eastern Europe.

Medieval maps such as the Hereford Mappa Mundi still assumed that Scandinavia was an island. Progress was made in the 16th century, and Gerard Mercator gave an accurate representation of all of Europe, including Scandinavia shown as a peninsula.

Circa 2014 there are maps of Europe that focus on the unemployment rate of each country, the expansion of member countries of the North Atlantic Treaty Organization, and more.

== See also ==
- History of Cartography
- Geography of Europe
- Cartography of Asia
- Cartography of Africa
- Boundaries between continents
