= Cartography of Asia =

The cartography of Asia can refer to the representation of Asia on a map, or to depictions of the world by cartographers from Asia. Depictions of portions of Asia have existed on maps as early as the 6th century BCE, with maps being drafted to depict the Babylonian, Hellenistic Greek, and Han dynasty empires.

During the Middle Ages, Muslim geographers drew maps with more accurate depictions of Southern, Western, and Central Asia, and European maps began to more frequently represent Asia's landmass. Chinese geography from this period includes more detailed portrayals of the Indian Ocean, Arabian Peninsula, and East Africa. European maps of Asia would become much more accurate during the European Age of Discovery, starting in the 15th century.

Modern maps of Asia make use of digitization, photographic surveys, and satellite imagery.

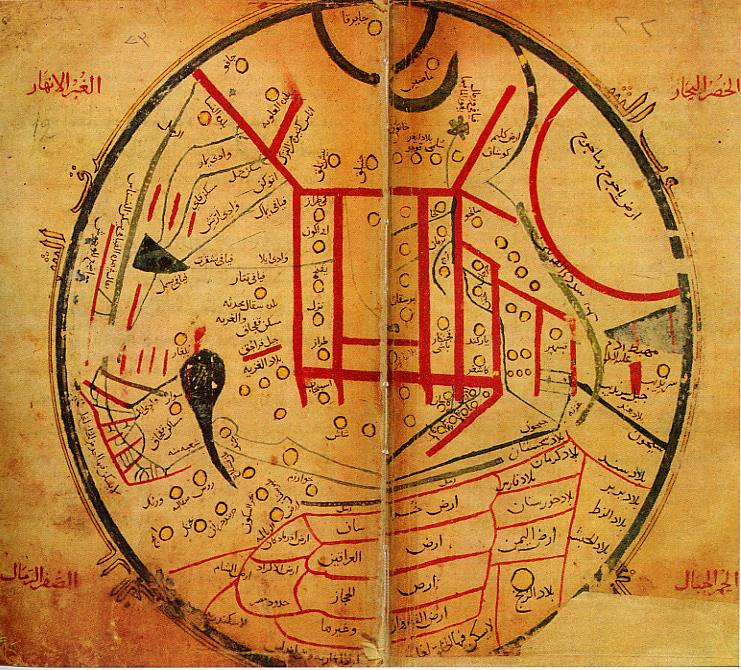
Map from Mahmud al-Kashgari's Diwanu Lughat at-Turk, showing the 11th century distribution of Turkic tribes.

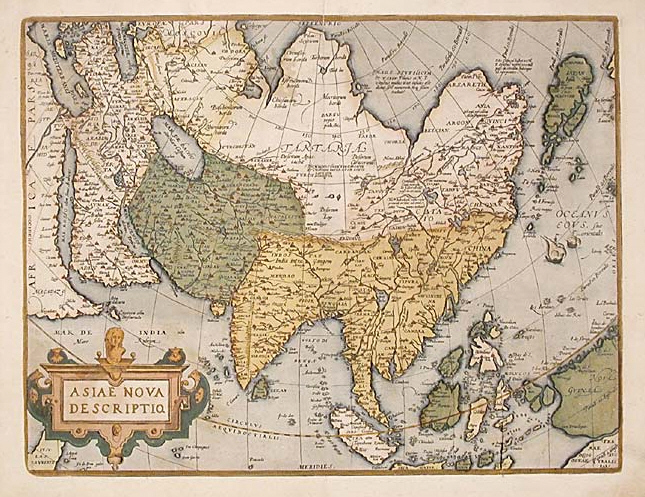
Abraham Ortelius, Asiae Nova Descriptio, 1595

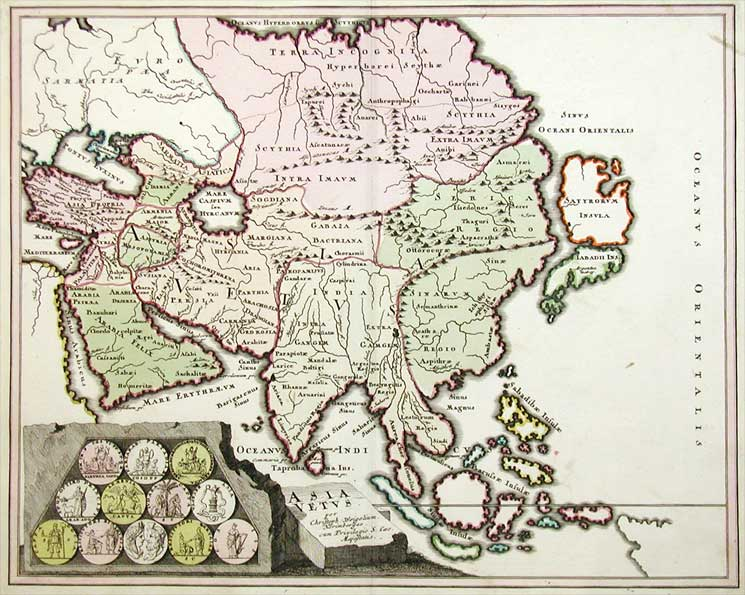
Map of Asia, ca. 1719

== Antiquity ==
Babylon in West Asia is featured at the center of the earliest known ancient world maps, beginning with the Babylonian world map of the 6th century BCE. This clay tablet presents a localized map of Babylon that includes rivers, surrounding terrain, an encircling ocean, and outer "islands" arranged in a seven-point star pattern.

In classical Greek geography, "Asia" was identified as one of the three major landmasses, alongside Europe and Libya. Geographic knowledge of Asia became more detailed during the Hellenistic period, particularly in the Ptolemy world map. Cartography of India can be traced to early navigational charts and architectural plans for construction.

By the 2nd century BCE, Chinese geography during the Han dynasty reflected awareness of Turkestan, a region where Hellenistic Greek and Han Chinese spheres of influence overlapped.

== Middle Ages ==
In medieval T and O maps, Asia makes for half the world's landmass, with Africa and Europe accounting for a quarter each. With the High Middle Ages, Southwest and Central Asia receive better resolution in Muslim geography, and the 11th century map by Mahmud al-Kashgari is the first world map drawn from a Central Asian point of view. In the same period, European explorers of the Silk Road like William Rubruck and Marco Polo increase geographical knowledge of Asia in the west, in particular establishing that the Caspian Sea is not connected to the northern ocean.

Chinese exploration by medieval times extends Chinese geographical knowledge to the Indian Ocean, the Arabian Peninsula and East Africa as well as Southeast Asia.

== Age of exploration ==
European maps of Asia become much more detailed from the 15th century, the 1459 Fra Mauro map showing a reasonably complete picture, including correctly placed Korea and Japan.

== Modern maps ==
Modern map making techniques in Asia, like other parts of the world, employ digitization, photographic surveys and printing. Satellite imageries, aerial photographs and video surveying techniques are also used.

== See also ==
- Geography of Asia
- Muslim geography
- Chinese geography
- Chinese exploration
- Cartography of India
- History of cartography
- History of geography
- Exploration of Asia
- Cartography of Europe
- Cartography of Africa
- Boundaries between continents

== Literature ==
- Harley and Woodward (eds.), The History of Cartography. Vol. 2. bk 2, Cartography in Traditional East and Southeast Asian Societies, University of Chicago Press (1994), ISBN 978-0-226-31637-6.
- Kenneth Nebenzahl, Mapping the Silk Road and Beyond, ISBN 0-7148-4409-8.
