= Thok Jalung =

Goldfield in Tibet

- Location in Tibet Automomous Region
- Location: Tibet Autonomous Region, People's Republic of China; 32.24°N 81.37°E

Thok Jalung was a goldfield in Tibet that gained international attention upon its discovery by the west.

Thok Jalung was one of many goldfields that stretched from Lhasa into western Tibet, north of the Tsangpo River watershed. Situated on the Changtang, 16,330 feet (4,980 m) above sea level, Thok Jalung was the highest altitude goldfield in the world and at the time was believed to be the highest altitude in the world inhabited all year round.

Thok Jalung was first visited by a non-Tibetan on 26 August 1867 when the pundit Nain Singh Rawat, who was secretly surveying Tibet, visited the mines. He would later say that Thok Jalung was the coldest place he had ever visited. It was not until 1906 that the first European visited Thok Jalung.

Thok Jalung was very productive and Nain Singh reported seeing one nugget weighing nearly 2 pounds (0.91 kg). The goldfield was about 1 mile (1.6 km) long, with a small stream running through the field, used to wash the gold out of the soil.

Miners lived in yak-hair tents pitched in holes two or more metres below the ground. There were about 300 miners during the summer and over 6,000 during winter, as frozen ground was less likely to collapse. As in many cases the miners' families were also staying onsite, one author has suggested a winter population of 20,000 at Thok Jalung.

Tibetans believed that gold nuggets contained life and were the parents of gold dust. They only extracted the dust. If a nugget was excavated in error from Thok Jalung it was immediately reburied.

== Sources ==
- Cooley, W. (1876) Physical Geography: Or The Terraqueous Globe and Its Phenomena, Dulau and Company.
- Hopkirk, P. (1982) Trespassers on the roof of the world, John Murray: London. ISBN 0719539382.
- Markham, C. (1999) Narratives of the Mission of George Bogle to Tibet and of the Journey of Thomas Manning to Lhasa, Asian Educational Services: New Delhi. ISBN 9788120613669.
- Montgomerie, T. (1869) "Report of the Trans-Himalayan Explorations during 1867", Proceedings of the Royal Geographical Society of London, Vol. 13, No. 3 (1868 - 1869)
- Waller, D. (2015) The Pundits: British Exploration of Tibet and Central Asia, University Press of Kentucky: Lexington, Kentucky. ISBN 9780813149042.
