= Shaukas =

Ethnic group native to India

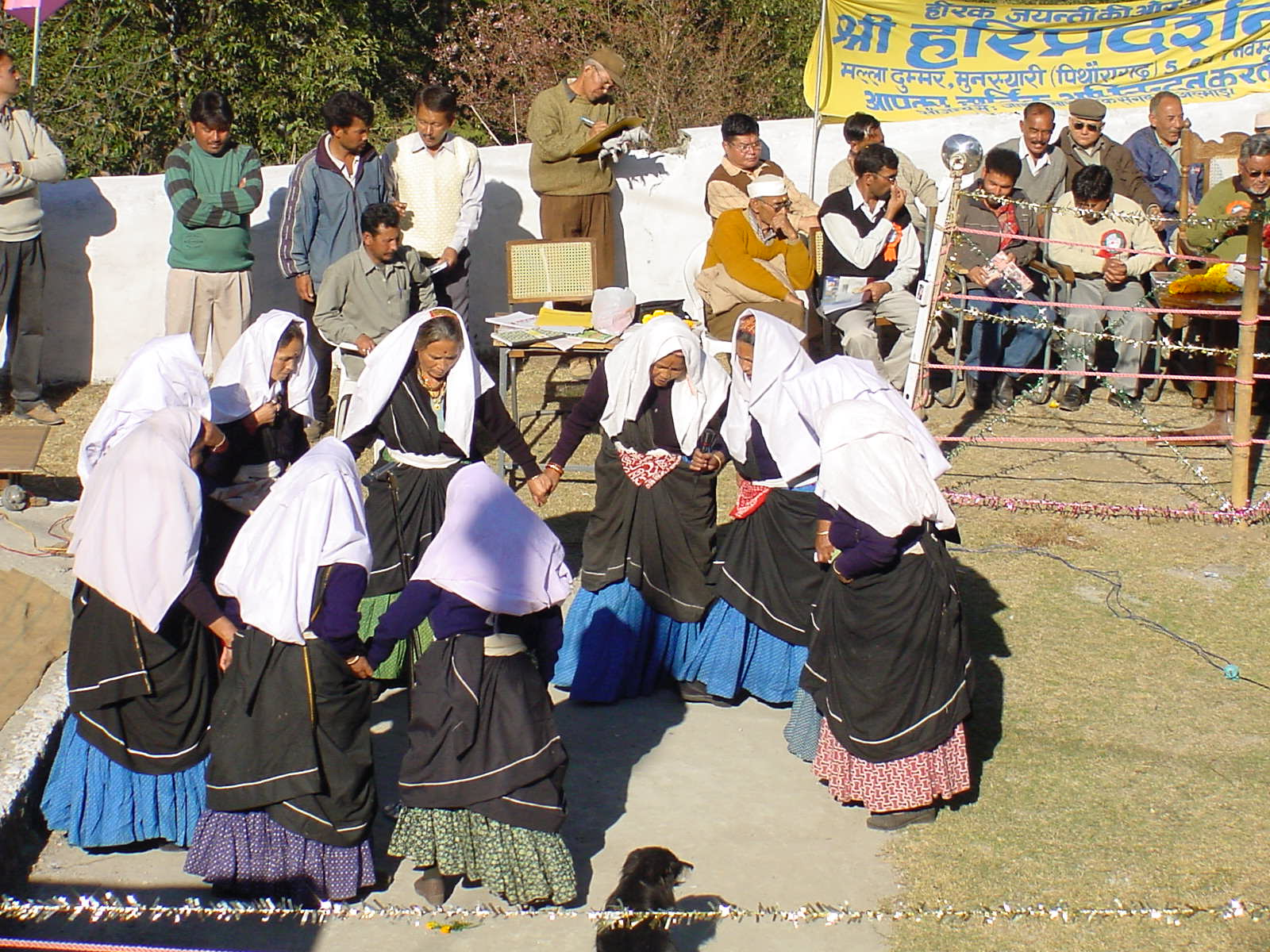
Shauka women singing in a public event in Malla Dumar, Munsyari

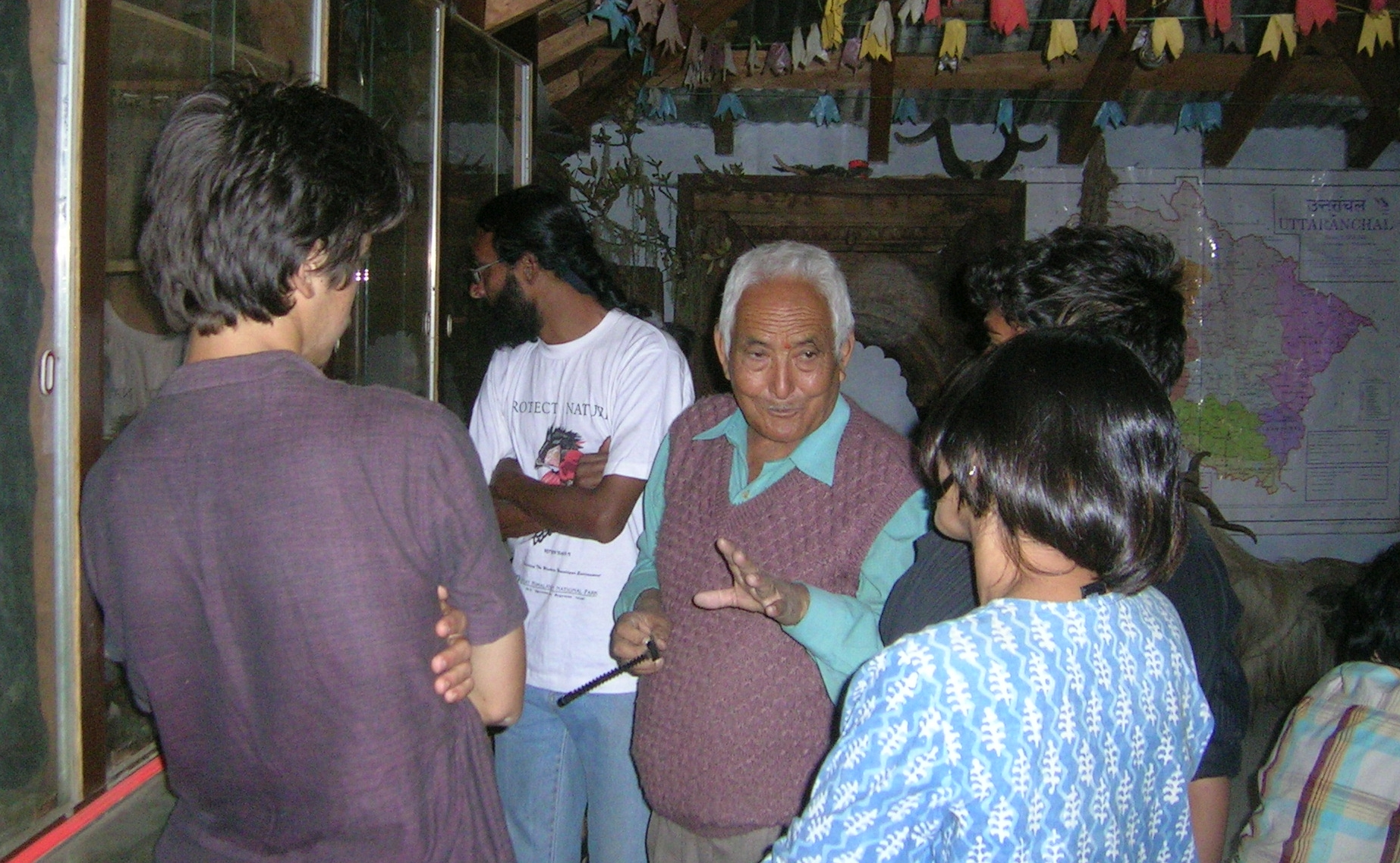
Pangtey Museum in Pithoragarh, a privately owned museum displaying artefacts related to the Shauka people

Surendra Singh Pangtey, a Shauka, narrating a joke in a form of Johari with many words from the now-extinct Rangas language

The Shauka people, also known as Rangkas and Johari, are a Tibeto-Burman ethnic group living in the Johar Valley of Gori Ganga river in Munsyari, tehsil of the Pithoragarh District in Uttarakhand, India. Shaukas are a part of Bhotiya community and were historically involved in trade between India and Tibet. Contemporarily, they are engaged in occupations like agriculture, trade, and animal husbandry. They currently speak the Johari, a dialect of Kumaoni, and spoke Rangas, a now-extinct, Tibeto-Berman language in the past. They do trade with Tibet in the place called Gyanima mandi. After the indo china war 1962 the trade is blocked because china took control over Tibet in 1959. But after the war the trade is done through lipu lekh pass for better relations between two countries but it was again stopped in 2020 after the covid 19

== Notable people ==
- Surendra Singh Pangtey
- Nain singh rawat

== See also ==
- Bhotia
