= Milam, India =

Milam
- village
- Location in Uttarakhand, India
- Country: India
- State: Uttarakhand
- District: Pithoragarh

Languages
  - Official: Hindi, Kumaoni
- Time zone: UTC+5:30 (IST)
- Vehicle registration: UK
- Website: uk.gov.in

Milam (or Meelam) is the last village situated in Johar valley of Pithoragarh district in the state of Uttarakhand, India. The river Gori Ganga originates from Milam Glacier, flows past the village and through the Johar Valley inhabited by Shauka and Nitwal people, and meets with Kali Ganga River at Jauljibi.

"Munsiari-Bugdiar-Milam Road" (MBMR), being constructed by the BRO as part of the India–China Border Roads (ICBRs) with expected completion date of March 2026, provides access to Milam from the district sub-division headquarter Munsiari.

== History ==
Historically, Milam was the principal village of the Malla Johar patti in the larger Johar Pargana, and served as a vital depot for the Trans-Himalayan trade with Tibet via the Untadhura pass. In the early 20th century, the village consisted of strongly built stone houses with heavy slate roofs. According to a special census in 1900, Milam had a population of 1,733, consisting almost entirely of Shauka traders. The village was only inhabited during the brief summer months from June to October, during which time the residents cultivated crops of buckwheat and barley on the alluvial land near the Gori river. For the remainder of the year, the village was completely buried in snow and abandoned as the inhabitants migrated with their livestock to winter encampments in Munsiari and other lower elevations.

British gazetteers from the period described the local climate as dry and bracing, though characterized by severe daily winds. Due to the high altitude and freezing temperatures, it was noted that grain could be stored for decades without deteriorating. At that time, the snout of the Milam Glacier was located just one mile above the village, and the Gori river—which carried heavy glacial sediment—served as the only drinking water source. The route upwards to the Tibetan border was notoriously steep and difficult, while the downward path to Munsiari required early-season travelers to cross the river over temporary snow bridges.

== Trade with Tibet ==
Milam is on a route over high mountain passes (Unta Dhura, Jandi Dhura and Kingribingri Dhura) to Gyanima mandi in Tibet. The border is closed since the Sino-Indian War of 1962, and Milam is now a ghost village with very few inhabitants. Before the war, it used to be a trade center bustling with 500 families. As of now all trade with Tibet is stopped and the families have settled in Munsiyari and other places in the lower ranges. In summer months very few people go there and cultivate medicinal plants, high altitude Buckwheat and Jambhu. Tibetan merchants visited this place and traded in Borax, precious stones, Pashmina and salt. The inhabitants of Milam too travelled along with pack mules to Tibet. They took rice, cotton clothes, jaggery, sugar, etc. to sell in Tibetan markets. The famous pandit-explorers Nain Singh and Kishan Singh who mapped Tibet territory belong to this village.

== Trekking ==
The trek to Milam village starts from Munsiyari a road head that can be reached from Almora or Pithoragarh. The trek passes through Lilam, Bogudiar, Rilkot, Martoli, Burfu and Bilju. Prominent peaks situated above the glacier are Hardeol, Trisuli, Nanda Ghoonti etc. Some of the camping places above the glacier are Nitwal dhar, Suraj kund etc. Nandadevi East base camp can be reached through a side valley from Ghangar and Pacchu villages. The ideal trekking period is from May to October excluding monsoon months. However, as the inhabitants of the upper villages tend to move down the valley for the winter months trekkers may find that food and accommodation is not available especially after the festival of Diwali.

== Prominent people ==
- Kishen Singh Rawat (1850–1921), honorary titled as Rai Bahadur by British Raj], was an Indian explorer and cartographer. He was first to map the Ramgarh crater on a finer scale of (1 : 63,360).
- Nain Singh Rawat, honorary titled as C.I.E by British raj, was an Indian explorer, he was the cousin of the explorer Krishna Singh Rawat. He would later say that Thok Jalung was the coldest place he had ever visited.
- Raghunandan Singh Tolia, Chief Secretary to the Government of Uttarakhand from 2003 to 2005.
- B S Jangoangi, Deputy Director General, GSI. Famous for his glaciology studies in Uttarakhand Himalaya region.

== See also ==
- Kalapani, Uttarakhand
