= Cartography of Africa =

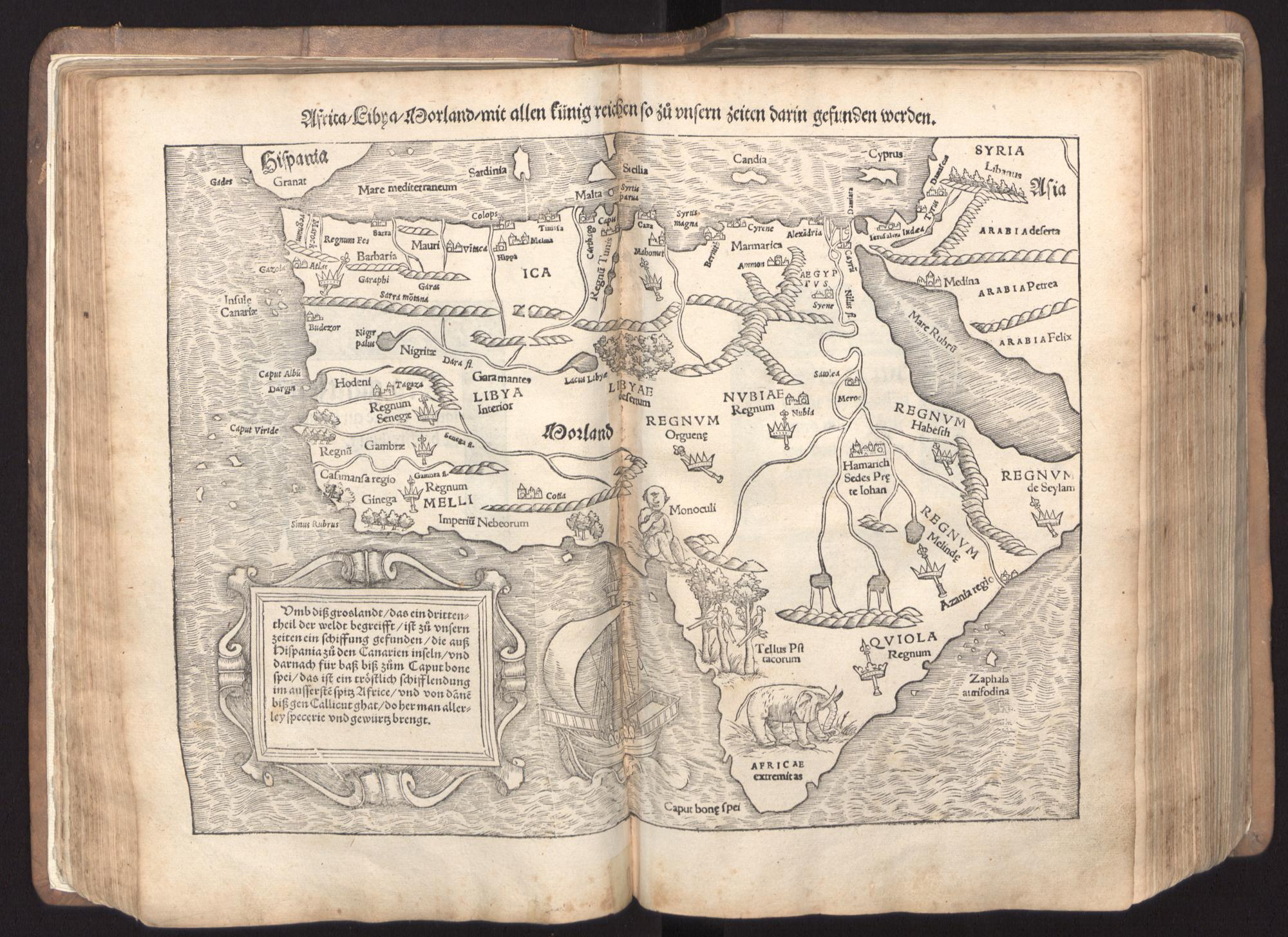
Map of Africa from Sebastian Münster's Cosmographia (1554)

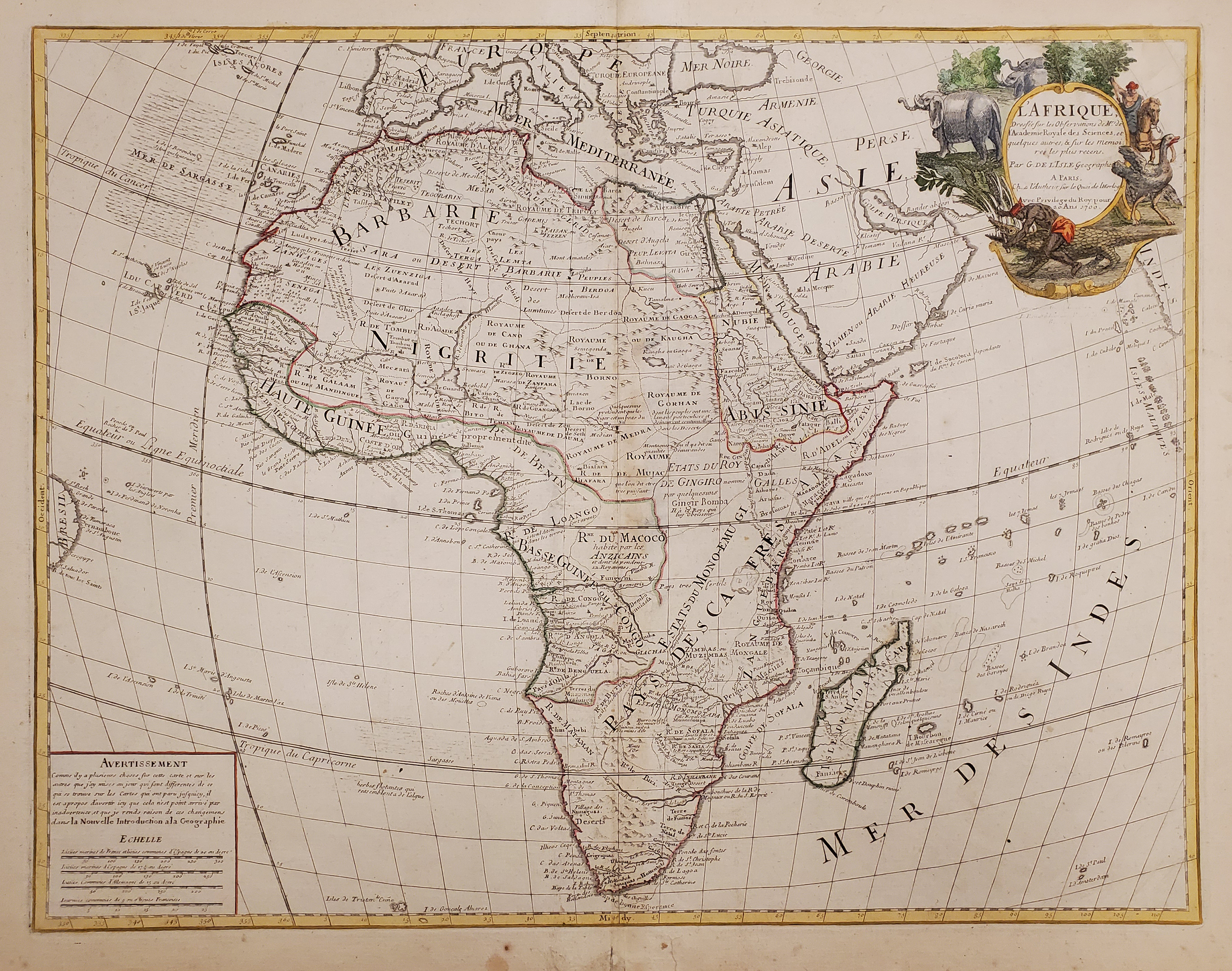
1700 map of Africa by Guillaume Delisle

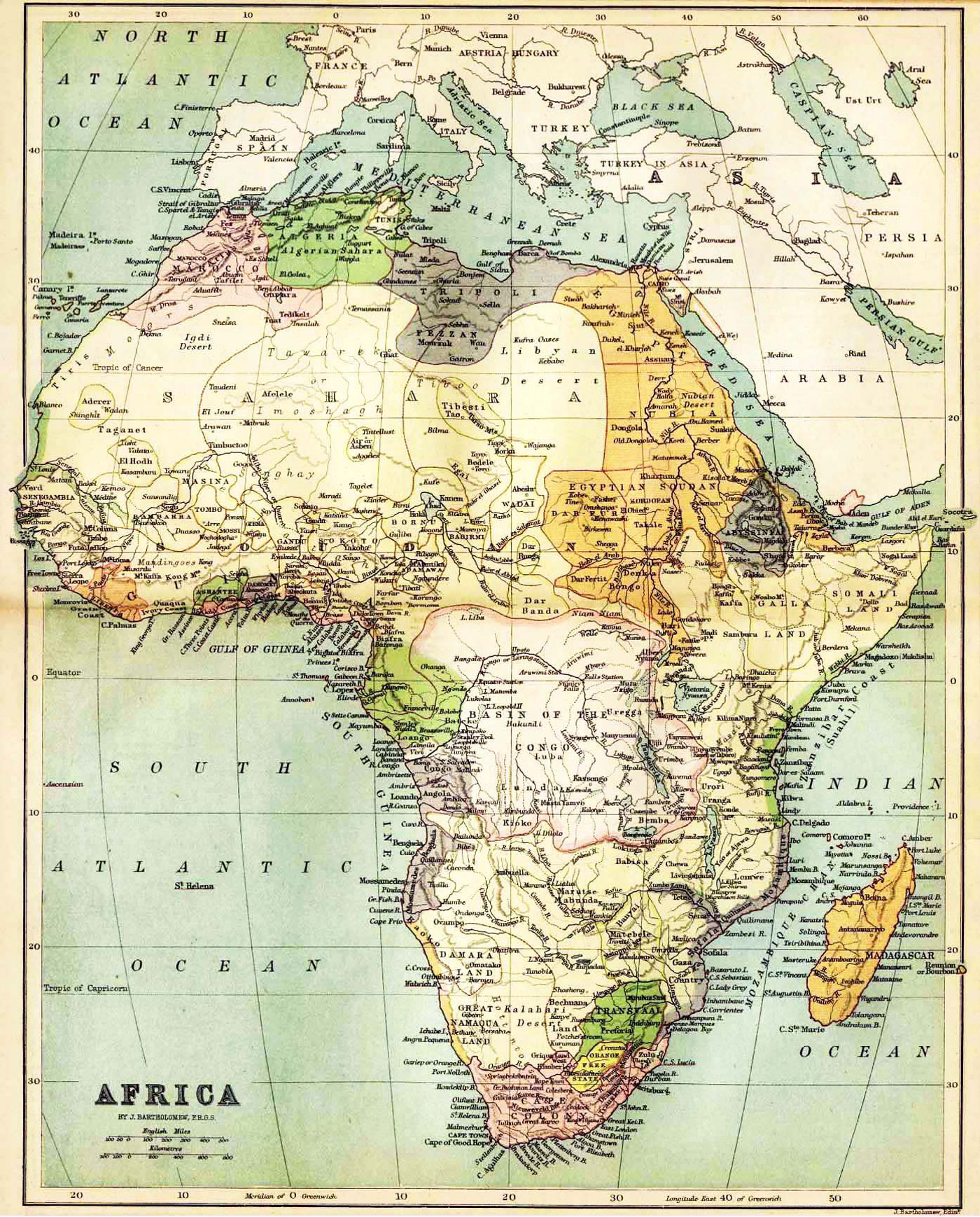
1885 map of Africa by John Bartholomew, showing the situation on the eve of the European scramble for Africa

== Indigenous maps ==
Whereas most known early maps of Africa were prepared in the framework of the colonial enterprise, some indigenous maps have been recently uncovered, particularly in West Africa and Ethiopia.

A notable indigenous map was devised by Ibrahim Njoya, king of the Bamum kingdom, completed around 1920. Njoya deployed surveyors to map his kingdom who used methods such as timing their walks to measure distances and collecting information from locals. The map used the native Bamum script to write down the names of towns and natural features.

== Earliest European maps ==
The earliest cartographic depictions of Africa are found in early world maps. In classical antiquity, Africa (also Libya) was assumed to cover the quarter of the globe south of the Mediterranean, an arrangement that was adhered to in medieval T and O maps.

The only part of Africa well known in antiquity was the coast of North Africa, described in Greek periplus from the 6th century BC. Hellenistic era geographers defined Ancient Egypt as part of Asia, taking the boundary of Asia and Egypt to lie at the Catabathmus Magnus (the escarpment of Akabah el-Kebir in western Egypt). Ptolemy's world map (2nd century) shows a reasonable awareness of the general topography of North Africa, but is unaware of anything south of the equator. The limit of Ptolemy's knowledge in the west is Cape Spartel (35° 48′ N); while he does assume that the coast eventually retreats in a "Great Gulf of the Western Ocean", this is not likely based on any knowledge of the Gulf of Guinea. In the east, Ptolemy is aware of the Red Sea (Sinus Arabicus) and the protrusion of the Horn of Africa, describing the gulf south of the Horn of Africa as Sinus Barbaricus.

== Modern maps ==
With the European exploration of Africa from the 15th century, maps of Africa became more precise. The Fra Mauro map of 1459 shows a more detailed picture of Africa as a continent, including the Cape of Diab at its southernmost point, reflecting an expedition of 1420. Sebastian Münster's Cosmographia (1545) labels the Cape of Good Hope, reached by Bartolomeu Dias in 1488, as caput bonae spei. The interior of Africa was not mapped in any detail before the second half of the 19th century.

== Sources ==
- Nyssen, Jan; Asfaha, Tesfaalem Ghebreyohannes; Meaza, Hailemariam; Dondeyne, S. (2020). "Exploration of a medieval African map (Aksum, Ethiopia) - How do historical maps fit with topography?". Phillippe de Maeyer: liber amicorum. Wachtebeke, Belgium: University Press. pp. 165–178.
- Smidt, W. (2003). "Cartography". Encyclopaedia Aethiopica. Vol. 1. Wiesbaden: Harrassowitz. pp. 688–691.

== See also ==
- History of Cartography
- Old World
