= Johar Valley =

Valley in Uttarakhand, India

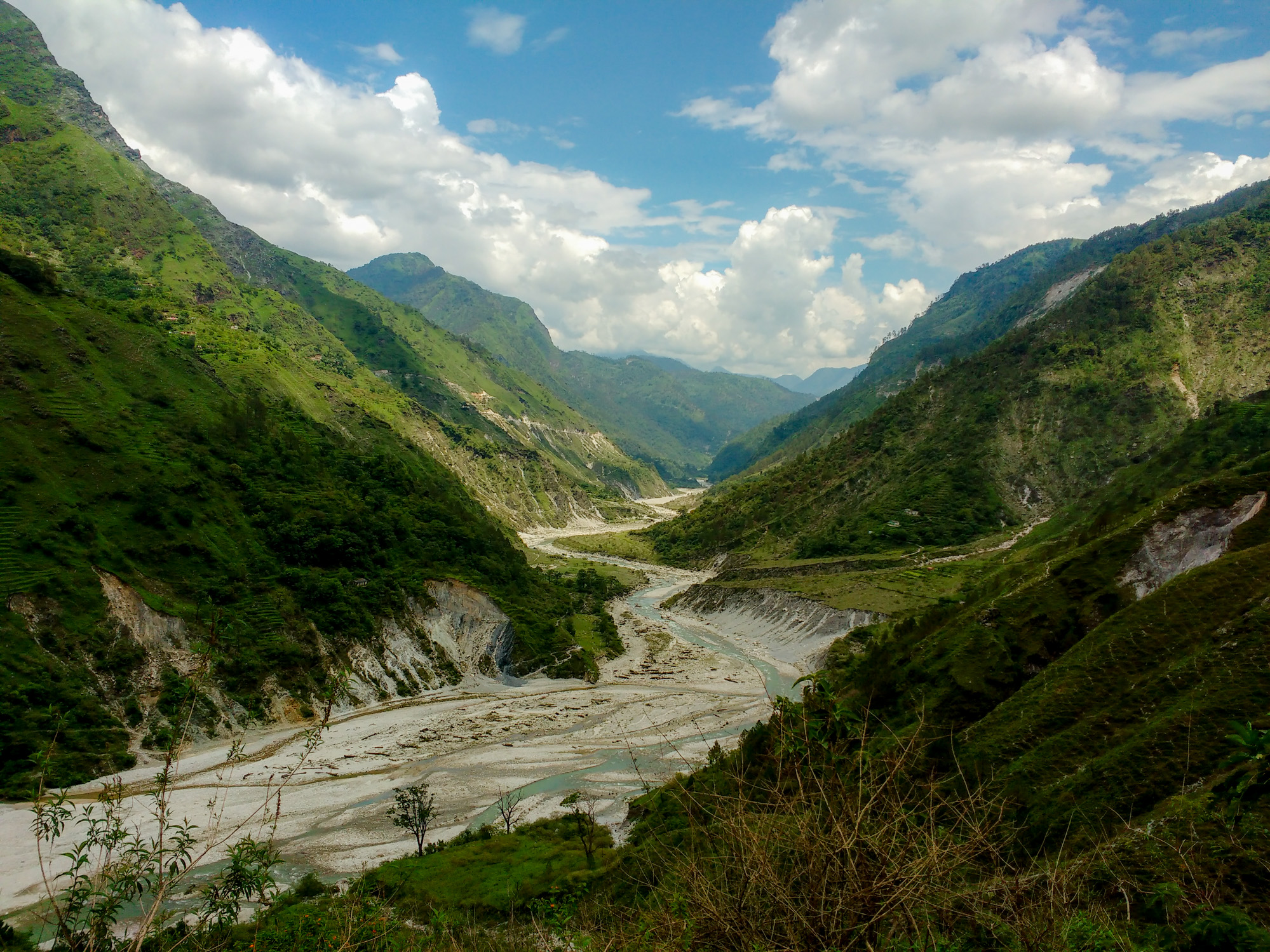
Johar valley as seen from Munsiyari.

Bhot Pradesh of Kumaon

Johar Valley (also known as Milam Valley or Gori Ganga Valley) is a valley located in Pithoragarh district of Uttarakhand, India, along the Gori Ganga river. The valley used to be a major trade route with Tibet. The best known villages in the valley are Martoli and Milam.

Munsiari-Bugdiar-Milam Road (MBMR), the paved motorable road being constructed by the BRO as part of the India–China Border Roads (ICBRs) with expected completion date of March 2026, runs through the Johar Valley of Gori Ganga River and connects Milam village with the district sub-division headquarter Munsiyari.

== Historical Administration and Geography ==
Historically, the Johar tract (administered as a pargana during the British period) was divided into three distinct pattis: Malla Johar, Talla Des, and Goriphat. The region is characterized by the Gori river basin, with the river's western branch rising from the Milam glacier. The Untadhura pass spans the north of the region, historically serving as a route for trade excursions into Tibet alongside the Balchha and Sholsel passes.

=== Malla Johar ===
Malla (Upper) Johar extends from the northern watershed down the Gori valley to its junction with the Balam river. Villages in this tract, such as Milam (the northernmost village) and Laspa, are situated at elevations exceeding 10,000 feet. Enclosed by tremendous mountain ranges, including the Panchachuli group to the east and the Nanda Devi and Nandakot massifs to the southwest, the area is predominantly an alpine and glacial environment. Historically, the region was inhabited by Bhotia traders whose livelihoods depended on the Trans-Himalayan trade between Tibet and the Indian plains. Due to heavy snow, the villages of Malla Johar were completely abandoned during the winter as the inhabitants migrated down to winter encampments in Munsiari.

=== Talla Des and Goriphat ===
To the south of Malla Johar lay the lower tracts of Talla Des (between the central ridge and the Ramganga river) and Goriphat (the eastern Gori valley). These areas were more fertile and heavily wooded compared to the upper valley. While agriculture in the highest villages remained precarious due to snow and hail, the lower elevations successfully grew mandua and rice. In addition to agriculture, the inhabitants historically maintained a robust pastoral economy, utilizing the highly nutritive alpine pastures to breed pack animals for the upper valley traders.

== Geography ==
The alpine trans-humant village of Milam is located one kilometer below the snout of the Milam glacier. Here a left-bank stream called Gonka joins the north to south flowing Gori Ganga River. The valley provides the approach route for access to peaks such as Nanda Devi East, Hardeol, Trishuli, Panchchuli and Nanda Kot.

== See also ==
- Shauka - Johar
- Kumaon
- List of valleys of India
